= Ewha Girls' Foreign Language High School =

- 이화여자외국어고등학교

Location
- 1-1, Sunhwa-dong, Jung-gu; Seoul, 100-130; South Korea
- Coordinates: 37.564945°N 126.9695624°E

Information
- School type: Private school
- Motto: Freedom, Love, Peace (자유, 사랑, 평화)
- Religious affiliation: Methodism
- Established: September 1991
- Principal: Lee Kyung-hee (이경희)
- Deputy Principal: Seo Jung-il(서정일)
- Faculty: 52
- Grades: Grades 10-12
- Gender: Girls
- Language: English, German, French, and Chinese
- Website: www.ewha-gfh.hs.kr

Ewha Girls' Foreign Language High School (Korean: 이화여자외국어고등학교; Hanja: 梨花女子外國語高等學校) is a foreign language high school located in Sunhwa-dong, Jung District, Seoul, South Korea.

== Notable alumnae ==
- Shin A-young, announcer
- Lim Yoon-sun, lawyer
