= The Genius (TV series) =

South Korean reality TV program

- Genre: Reality competition
- Developed by: A9 Media
- Country of origin: South Korea
- Original language: Korean
- No. of seasons: 4
- No. of episodes: 48

Production
- Producer: Jung Jong-yeon
- Running time: 60–90 minutes

Original release
- Network: tvN
- Release: April 26, 2013 – September 12, 2015

Related
- Society Game

The Genius (Korean: 더 지니어스, a.k.a. The Genius Game) is a South Korean reality game show. The first season premiered on April 26, 2013 on tvN, with four seasons in total airing between 2013 and 2015.

The show pits thirteen contestants against each other as they compete in various challenges, known as matches, which test their strategic thinking and social skills. Contestants are eliminated in head-to-head matches until only one remains and is awarded the title of "the Genius" and a cash prize.

== Format ==
Thirteen contestants, often celebrities, are selected to play in each season. Each episode (besides the season finale) features a Main Match and a Death Match.

In the Main Match, all players compete to win a "token of life", which guarantees them safety from elimination that episode. What determines the winners and losers of each Main Match depends from match to match, but typically, if a single player wins the Main Match, they earn one token of life for themselves and another to give away to a player of their choice. Some Main Matches allow for more than one winner, in which case each of the winners receives one token of life. The loser of the Main Match (as determined by that match's rules) is the "elimination candidate" and is automatically sent to the Death Match. The elimination candidate selects a player without a token of life to compete against in the Death Match. If multiple players lost the Main Match, the winner(s) of the Main Match select the elimination candidate from among the losers.

The Death Match is a one-on-one challenge, and the loser is eliminated from the season. Once two players remain, they compete in the best-of-three Final Match, and the first player to win two challenges is declared the winner of the season.

Each season also features "garnets", which function as the show's in-game currency, and can be used to purchase advantages during certain matches or given to other players to persuade them to make certain decisions. Every player begins the season with one garnet each, and can earn more garnets by winning Main Matches. In seasons one and two, the winner of a Death Match earned the losing player's garnets; in seasons three and four, the loser's garnets were removed from the game instead. At the end of the season, the winner's garnets are converted into cash, which each garnet worth ₩1,000,000.

== Series overview ==
Season	Subtitle	Winner	Runner-up	Prize money	Episodes	Originally released	
Season	Subtitle	Winner	Runner-up	Prize money	Episodes	First released	Last released
1	Rules of the Game	Hong Jin-ho	Kim Kyung-ran	₩79,000,000	12	April 16, 2013	July 12, 2013
2	Rule Breaker	Lee Sang-min	Lim Yo-hwan	₩62,000,000	12	December 7, 2013	February 22, 2014
3	Black Garnet	Jang Dong-min	Oh Hyun-min	₩60,000,000	12	October 1, 2014	December 17, 2014
4	Grand Final	Jang Dong-min	Kim Kyung-hoon	₩132,000,000	12	June 27, 2015	September 12, 2015

== Accusations of plagiarism ==
The Genius has been accused of plagiarizing popular Japanese manga series through its choice of matches. For example, the first Main Match of season one, "1.2.3 Game" has been compared to "Restricted Rock, Paper, Scissors" from Kaiji, and season one's fourth Main Match "Zombie Game" to "Angels and Demons" from Liar Game: Season 2 (aka, "Infection Game" in original manga). People also pointed out similarities in music, format, visual direction, and game style to the Japanese live-action version Liar Game.

Jung Jong-yeon, the producer of The Genius, claimed that all games in the series are designed by themselves, and they never bought any other media's copyrights. He initially denied receiving any inspiration from these media, instead saying he was "inspired by Big Brother and Survivor, not a Liar Game" during an interview in 2013. But in 2014, he later admitted to using Liar Game as a reference by saying "(it was) reference, but not copied" and still denied plagiarizing any matches from Liar Game.

tvN later broadcast a Korean live-action remake of Liar Game in 2014. But it was mentioned that only drama production company 'Apollo Pictures' hold the Liar Game's copyright, not The Genius team. Jung Jong-yeon says The Genius has nothing to do with this remake.

== Awards and nominations ==
Year	Award	Category	Recipient	Result
2016	tvN10 Awards	Best Content Award, Variety	The Genius	Won
2016	tvN10 Awards	Made in tvN, Actor in Variety	Hong Jin-ho	Nominated

== International adaptations ==
Country	Name	Host(s)	TV station	Premiere	Finale
Netherlands	The Genius	Unknown	NTR	3 October 2022	21 November 2022
United Kingdom	Genius Game	David Tennant	ITV	30 April 2025	11 June 2025
