= The Genius (Dutch game show) =

Dutch television game show

- Genre: Reality competition
- Based on: The Genius by tvN
- Country of origin: Netherlands
- Original language: Dutch
- No. of seasons: 1
- No. of episodes: 8

Original release
- Network: NTR
- Release: 3 October – 21 November 2022

The Genius is a Dutch television game show series based on the South Korean programme of the same name.

== Cast ==
- Fabian Franciscus
- Thomas Olde Heuvelt
- Nelke Mast
- Nizar El Manouzi
- Nouchka Fontijn
- Roxanne Kwant
- Feride Tosun
- Jasper Lijfering
- Rick Broers
- Anna-Maja Kazarian
