= Choi Jung-moon =

South Korean entertainer (born 1992)

- Born: July 15, 1992 (age 33); Seoul, South Korea
- Genres: K-pop, Dance pop
- Occupations: Singer
- Years active: 2012-present

Choi Jung-moon (Korean: 최정문; born July 15, 1992) is a South Korean singer and television personality. She is a former member of the K-pop girl group Tinus, and is a cast member in the reality show The Genius: Grand Final. She has also appeared in The Genius: Rules of the Game in 2013. She is also a member of Mensa International.
