= The Genius: Black Garnet =

- Winner: Jang Dong-min
- No. of episodes: 12

Release
- Original network: tvN
- Original release: October 1 – December 17, 2014

Season chronology
- ← Previous; The Genius: Rule Breaker Next → The Genius: Grand Final

The Genius: Black Garnet (Korean: 더 지니어스: 블랙 가넷) is the third season of The Genius. It debuted on tvN on October 1, 2014.

== Cast ==
(in alphabetical order)

- Choi Yeon-seung
- Ha Yeon-joo
- Jang Dong-min
- Kang Yong-suk
- Kim Jung-hoon
- Kim Kyung-hoon
- Kim Yoo-hyun
- Kwon Ju-ri
- Lee Jong-beom
- Nam Hwee-jong
- Oh Hyun-min
- Shin Ah-young
- Yoo Su-jin

== Format Change ==
Theft and Violence

It was explicitly stated that players who commit theft and/or violence during the gameplay would lose the Main Match if they do so. They would be the elimination candidate for the day.

Discarding of garnets

Garnets of the losers of the death matches would be discarded as opposed to the previous seasons, where it was given to the winner of the death match. Both players would have to hand in their garnets to the dealers for them to safeguard, and the winner of the death match would have his/her garnets given back to him/her.

Black Garnets

Season 3 showcased a new addition in the garnet pool: Black Garnets. Players that had won a death match would receive a black garnet. It may also be used like a garnet (such as in trading and/or deals with players) but may not be used in biddings (with the use of garnets). In episode 10, each black garnet was converted to 2 garnets (worth 2,000,000 won or 2,000 USD).

Black Missions

Players that had 3 black garnets (either gained through death matches or received from other players) could choose to challenge a Black Mission, if they had been chosen for the Death Match. There were 3 different Black Missions in the entire game, which were: Observation, Memory and Mathematics. Should the player succeed in the Black Mission, he/she may choose another player to play for him/her in the Death Match instead. If the player had failed in the Black Mission, he/she must carry on to the Death Match.

The three different Black Missions:

- Observation

(attempted by Kim Jung-hoon in Episode 4)

The player will play a game of Gyul! Hap! in this Black Mission, and must find all the Haps before shouting Gyul. If the player shouts Gyul before finding all the Haps, he/she loses immediately.

Kim Jung-hoon failed in this Black Mission.

- Memory

(attempted by Lee Jong-bum in Episode 7)

The player will memorize 12 bus stop names and their order within 1 minute. The cards will then be shuffled and only their number (order) will be displayed. The player must read out all 12 bus stop names in the random shuffled order that was shown.

Lee Jong-bum failed in this Black Mission.

- Mathematics

(this Black Mission was not attempted and not shown)

== Episodes ==
Episode	Main Match		Main Match winner	Immunity receiver	Main Match loser	Appointed opponent	Death Match	Eliminated
1	Fruit Stand		Kim Kyung-hoon	Oh Hyun-min	Shin Ah-young	Kwon Ju-ri	Black and White II	Kwon Ju-ri
2	Jury Game		Jang Dong-min; Oh Hyun-min; Choi Yeon-seung; Ha Yeon-joo; Shin Ah-young; Yoo Su-jin; Nam Hwee-jong	-	Kang Yong-suk	Kim Kyung-hoon	Betting Rock Paper Scissors	Kim Kyung-hoon
3	Middle Race		-	Except Choi Yeon-seung; Kang Yong-suk	Choi Yeon-seung; Kang Yong-suk	-	Black and White II	Kang Yong-suk
4	Swords and Shields		Oh Hyun-min; Choi Yeon-seung; Kim Yoo-hyun; Shin Ah-young; Lee Jong-bum	Yoo Su-jin	Nam Hwee-jong	Kim Jung-hoon	Double-sided Poker	Nam Hwee-jong
5	Miner Game		Oh Hyun-min	Jang Dong-min	Choi Yeon-seung	Yoo Su-jin	Double-sided Poker	Yoo Su-jin
6	Stormy Stock Market		Jang Dong-min	Oh Hyun-min	Kim Jung-hoon	Lee Jong-bum	Betting Rock Paper Scissors	Kim Jung-hoon
7	Constellation Game		Ha Yeon-joo	Shin Ah-young	Oh Hyun-min	Lee Jong-bum	Twelve Janggi	Lee Jong-bum
8	Investment and Donation		Oh Hyun-min	Jang Dong-min	Kim Yoo-hyun	Shin Ah-young	Memory Maze	Shin Ah-young
9	Middle Race		Jang Dong-min; Choi Yeon-seung	-	Kim Yoo-hyun	Ha Yeon-joo	Memory Maze	Kim Yoo-hyun
10	Chain Auction		Hong Jin-ho ^{1}	Oh Hyun-min	Jang Dong-min	Ha Yeon-joo	Monorail	Ha Yeon-joo
11	Doubting Yutnori		Jang Dong-min	-	Oh Hyun-min; Choi Yeon-seung	-	Betting Black and White	Choi Yeon-seung
12	Finals	Twelve Janggi	Oh Hyun-min		Jang Dong-min			
12	Finals	Same Number Hunt	Jang Dong-min		Oh Hyun-min			
12	Finals	Betting Rock, Paper, Scissors	Jang Dong-min		Oh Hyun-min			

Footnotes
^1 The winner is a guest player.

=== Elimination Chart ===
Ranking	Contestants	Rounds												MM WIN	DM IMM	DM WIN
Ranking	Contestants	1	2	3	4	5	6	7	8	9	10^{3}	11	12	MM WIN	DM IMM	DM WIN
1	Jang Dong-Min	IN	WIN	IMM	IN	IMM	WIN	IN	IMM	WIN	DM	WIN	Winner(2:1)	4	3	1
2	Oh Hyun-Min	IMM	WIN	IMM	WIN	WIN	IMM	DM	WIN	IN	IMM	DM	Runner-Up(1:2)	4	4	2
3	Choi Yeon-Seung	IN	WIN	DM	WIN	DM	IN	IN	IN	WIN	IN	ELIM	Oh Hyun-Min	3	0	2
4	Ha Yeon-Joo	IN	WIN	IMM	IN	IN	IN	WIN	IN	DM	ELIM		Jang Dong-Min	2	1	1
5	Kim Yoo-Hyun	IN	IN	IMM	WIN	IN	IN	IN	DM	ELIM			Jang Dong-Min	2	0	1
6	Shin Ah-Young	DM	WIN	IMM	WIN	IN	IN	IMM	ELIM				Oh Hyun-Min	2	2	1
7	Lee Jong-Beom	IN	IN	IMM	WIN	IN	DM	ELIM					Oh Hyun-Min	1	1	1
8	Kim Jung-Hoon	IN	IN	IMM	DM	IN	ELIM						Jang Dong-Min	0	1	1
9	Yoo Su-Jin	IN	WIN	IMM	IMM	ELIM							Jang Dong-Min	2	1	0
10	Nam Hwee-Jong	IN	WIN	IMM	ELIM								Jang Dong-Min	1	1	0
11	Kang Yong-Suk	IN	DM	ELIM									Jang Dong-Min	0	0	1
12	Kim Kyung-Hoon	WIN	ELIM										Jang Dong-Min	1	0	0
13	Kwon Ju-Ri	ELIM											Jang Dong-Min	0	0	0
Garnets^{1}		15	27	33	43	52	44	50	58	68	84	38	60 (₩60,000,000)^{6}			
Black Garnets		1	2	4	3	5	7	6	8	8^{2}						
Discarded Garnets		1	2	1(1)^{1}	0	0	3	0	0	0	0	22^{4}				

Footnotes
^1 Black Garnets are not counted towards the total amount of garnets.
^2 Discarded black garnets。
^3 At the beginning of Episode 10, every black garnet is exchanged for 2 normal garnets.
^4 The winner of Round 10 is the guest player, Hong Jin-Ho; therefore, there is no winner amongst the contestants. The first-place winner amongst the contestants is Oh Hyun-Min, who received immunity for the round.
^5 The discarded garnets from the last eliminated player will be added into the final garnet amount as a special award.

== Main Matches ==
=== Episode 1: Fruit Stand (13 Contestants) ===
Each player is assigned two fruits to sell. In each of 4 rounds, they will be secretly setting their price for each of their assigned fruits, and trying to be the lowest price in order to selling them. Only the player(s) who set the lowest price (from $1-$5) for each type of fruit can sell that fruit. The number of fruits sold equals to the number of people assigned the fruit. E.g. If 5 apple players all set their price as $5, they all will each sell 1 apple and earn $5 each. But if one player underbids them at $4, he/she steals the entire sale, selling 5 apples and getting $20 alone. If there are several player with the same lowest bid they split the total earnings for that fruit between each other. E.g. if 3 apple players set their price at $4 instead, each of them gets $20/3=$6. The final price for all fruits and the earnings shares from each fruit are shown after each round.

Each player can use a Change ability and Secret ability once during the 4 rounds. If a player uses Change, he/she change one of the assigned fruits to any other fruit. If a player used the Secret ability, he/she can obscure the price and earnings for a fruit of their choice for that round.

Player(s) who earned the most after 4 rounds win the game and the player(s) with least money loses. If there are more than one loser, the winners select one of the losers to go to the death match. If there is only one winner, he/she also get an extra token of life to give to anyone, except the elimination candidate. The elimination candidate can only pick his/her death match opponent among players who didn't win and don't have a token of life.

=== Episode 2: Jury Game (12 Contestants) ===
This game is similar to the game "Resistance" with citizens and criminals. Players draw their secret roles - citizens, citizen leader, criminals or criminal boss. Criminals know each other, but don't know identity of their boss. Citizen leader knows who criminals are but also does not know the criminal boss.

In each round, a jury is appointed. All players then vote to approve or disband this jury. If approved, the jury then anonymously vote "Guilty" or "Not Guilty". All jury players must vote Guilty to reach a "Guilty" verdict; else it will be a "Not Guilty" verdict.

Citizens win after reaching 3 "Guilty" verdicts, while criminals win if they get 3 "Not Guilty" verdicts.

The leaders on both sides have to stay secret because if losing team guesses the identity of a leader in opposing team, then they turn the tables and win instead.

=== Episode 3: Middle Race (11 Contestants) ===
Players first vote anonymously who will pick his/her game role last. This player can in turn choose the preceding player to pick his/her role and so on. All players pick a role based on this order, and each role has different abilities. The goal of Middle Race is to finish in the middle of the pack, with the first and last finishers losing and going to the death match. Players are given a set of 4 "move cards" numbered 1-4. On their turn, they submit one card and move their piece on a board that number of spaces. When player is out of cards, only then can they replenish their set of cards.

Roles have unique abilities which can influence movements (or movement cards). Some roles have active offensive abilities, e.g. pushing someone away from the middle with the goal of making them first or last. Some roles have passive abilities that can activate even when it is not their turn. E.g. When a player lands on a place already occupied by Push, Push can move that player one space forwards or backwards. Another example is that Union can move players who land 1 space in front of them back 1 space to the same space as them.

=== Episode 4: Swords and Shields (10 Contestants) ===
Players are split into 2 teams of five - Team Verita and Team Falso. Each team appoints a secret leader before the game starts.

Teams are given limited number of cards with swords, dual swords, shield or bare hands on them. Each player "equips" these cards for both right and left hands. These picks are not visible to other team.

Team then start taking turns exchanging blows. Attacker announces who they are attacking using sword(s) and in what hand. Player in defending team can try to challenge attacker and call bluff on him/her having a sword in the first place. If attacker didn't have a sword, they die. If attacker didn't lie, then the doubter dies.

Player receiving the attack can then declares if they will defend with a shield in right or left hand. Attacking team can now similarly challenge the defender on that claim as above. Shields, real or imaginary, can take 3 hits before becoming unusable.

When a team's leader dies, that team loses. All players in the winning team receive a token of life plus an extra one which they can give to someone in losing team. They also pick the player for the death match.

=== Episode 5: Miner Game (9 Contestants) ===
Players are split into 3 teams of three. Teams take turns "mining" by putting a hand into a prop that symbolizes a mine and grabbing cubes out of it. Different types of cubes are worth different points. Special black cubes are "bombs". If a team mines three bombs or more — their mining turn is over and they get nothing. Until then, the team is free to mine further until they decide to stop.

When one team is mining, each spectator player from the 2 other teams secretly submits to the dealer the number of points they want to get (from 1 to 50). If miners extracted more than or equal to sum of ordered points — spectators get what they ordered and miners themselves divide the rest of the points between them. If the miners extracted less — spectators get nothing, and miners divide their entire haul. Also, the most greedy spectator with the biggest ordered amount gives that amount of his/her points to people with the least ordered amount. If miners get three bombs — they get nothing, but spectators still get their ordered amount.

=== Episode 6: Stormy Stock Market (8 Contestants) ===
Players are given $10 and take turns trading on a model stock market.

Just like with Scamming Horse Race games, stock fluctuations are pre-determined and players are given hints detailing which stock price will go up/down, by what amount and when.

There are a limited number of shares for each company in the market, and players cannot hold more than seven shares per company.

To trade, players queue to enter the dealer's room one by one. Once inside they have up to 40 seconds to sell any shares and then buy any shares at the prevailing rates. It is possible to time the visit to the dealer's room so that the prices update during the 40 seconds. The player can then capitalize on the changing prices instantly by selling rising stocks, or to buy stocks that just dropped before the dealer runs out of these stocks.

The player that made the most money (both in cash and in shares) wins, and player(s) with the least money goes to the death match.

=== Episode 7: Constellation Game (7 Contestants) ===
Players need to collect different colored stars to complete these constellations: - 3 red stars make Aries (2 points) - 4 yellow stars make Sagittarius (3 points) - 5 blue stars make Cassiopeia (5 points) - 6 green stars make Lyra (7 points) - White stars can be used as wildcards in any constellation. Black stars are "bombs".

If a player manages to complete 3 constellations, the game ends and he/she wins. The player with the least stars loses and goes to death match. Alternatively, if someone collects 3 black stars, they also lose, and the winner is the one with the most points.

Stars are collected in rounds. Each round has 7 random colored stars and one black star to be distributed among players.

Players have cards with numbers from 1 to 5 on them. They present these cards to dealer back side up. After all players put their cards down, cards are flipped revealing the numbers. Players who picked the same numbers don't get anything. The remaining players take up to as many stars as it says on their card, in order from lowest value to highest, i.e. player with 1 is the first to take a star, but they can only take one, player with 2 goes second and takes 2 stars and so on.

=== Episode 8: Investment and Donation (6 Contestants) ===
Players are each given an initial sum of money. In each round players enter dealer's room one by one and give (or not) some money up for investment and/or donation. Player who invested the highest amount gets the "Top Investor" badge. If there are more than 1 player who invested the same highest amount, they get nothing while the player who invested the next highest amount gets the "Top Investor" badge. All player who donated the least amount gets the "Miser" badge (but any who also received the "Top Investor" badge are exempt).

The game is played over 9 rounds. The player who received the most "Top Investor" badges wins, while the player who received the most "Miser" badges loses and goes to the death match.

=== Episode 9: Middle Race II (5 Contestants + 5 Guests) ===
This is an updated version of the main match in episode 3, with some rule changes and new roles and abilities. E.g. Union ability is no longer passive. Each player has invited a guest partner as an additional player, and if the guest wins, it is also equivalent to the player winning. So some of the new roles are more supportive in nature, to help the partnerships.

The winners (5th and 6th) decide the player who goes to the death match, who then picks his opponent among the other non-winners as usual.

=== Episode 10: Chain Auction (4 Contestants + 2 Guests) ===
The guests joining this game are two previous Genius winners: Hong Jinho and Lee Sangmin.

Each player gets a tile with a hidden number on it. Then they get 4 more tiles with numbers and mathematical operators through auctions. The goal is to make a math expression with these tiles. The result is calculated according to the order of operations and fractional parts are dropped. The goal is for the result to be closest to 10, with a maximum score of 20 being awarded for reaching 10, and less points the further from 10 the result is.

Before revealing their expressions, each player also submits their guesses of what other players' hidden numbers are. Any player who guessed correctly gets 3 points added and the 3 points are taken from the score of the player whose number was correctly guessed.

To compete in auctions, players are given 20 coins initially. Bidding goes in clockwise order based on the players' seats. The player that bid the most gets the first pick of auction's selection. Second to pick is the player right before winning player and so on (picks go in counter-clockwise order).

The remaining coins at the end of a game are added to the players' point tally converted to 2 points for each coin. Players are free to exchange tiles and give coins to each other as they see fit.

=== Episode 11: Doubting Yutnori (3 Contestants + 4 Guests) ===
Doubting Yutnori is played with guests who are this season's eliminated players: Hweejong, Ahyoung, Kyunghoon and Yuhyun.

Guests are playing game of yutnori among themselves, and win by getting both their pieces to the end of the yutnori board. To move their pieces they use a special die with 10 sides. 8 sides of the die denote the number of spaces to move, while 2 sides have "Bust!" which means that a piece moved back to the starting point. Guests take turns to roll the die and only they see their own rolls. They announce their roll and if no one doubts it, they can then move their pieces according to their claim.

Players participate by doubting and betting. After a guest announces his/her roll, any player can doubt it. If the guest was telling the truth, the player leaves his garnet on a table. If they caught a lie, the guest's piece is moved back to the starting point and the player takes a garnet from the table (if there are any). The winner of the yutnori race also takes the remaining garnets on the table (up to 10 garnets, with surplus going to the finale prize pool).

Players can also bet on the order of finishes and on the overall yutnori win. At first, players bet on first finishing piece and each time a piece finishes there is a new bet for next piece. This bet has double rewards if a player guesses right. Overall win bet nets triple rewards but a player cannot choose the guest themselves — it is a random pick before yutnori game starts. If a player doesn't have faith in the randomly chosen guest's ability to complete the race, they can also bet a minimum 1 garnet or maximum 10 garnets if they think otherwise. Players' bets are secret and it is in players' interest to keep them secret because that way they can collude with several guests at once telling them that they have picked them and then partner up and help their guest partners by doubting their competitors.

Player who has the most garnets by the end of yutnori game wins the game and the other two go to the death match.

=== Episode 12: The Final (2 Contestants) ===
As in the previous 2 seasons, the final match consists of three games, two of which have been played in previous Death Matches. Before the match starts, the 11 eliminated contestants are invited to return, and each of them selects a secret advantage to give to one of the finalists. Three advantages exist for each game, and the Order Select, Copy, and Cancel advantages return from the previous 2 seasons. The first finalist to win two games is declared the champion.

== Death Matches/Final Matches ==
=== Episodes 1, 3: Black and White II ===
Both players are each given a pool of 99 points at the start, which is used for bidding in the 9 rounds of this game. Each round, both players take turns to spend any number of remaining points from their pool as their bid (including 0). Bids are not revealed to the other player. The round is won by the player with the higher bid, and tied if the bids are the same. The winner of the round bids first for the next round.

There are two hints to help players guess how much their opponent has bid in each round: 1) When a player bids 10 or more, a white card is shown to the opponent; else a black card is shown. 2) Each player has a row of indicator lamps that show their remaining points in 20-point ranges. E.g. Once the remaining points drop below 80 after spending some as a bid, the first indicator lamp will go off and so on.

The player who wins more rounds wins the overall game. If the number of wins by both players are the same, the overall game is tied and replayed.

=== Episodes 2, 6, 12: Betting Rock, Paper, Scissors ===
Each spectator not competing in the death match chooses either rock, paper or scissors. Players take turns playing Rock, Paper, Scissors against one of the spectators, with the other player betting on the outcome. Bets are fixed at 1 chip in first 4 rounds, 2 in the next 3 rounds and 3 chips in the last 3 rounds. Betting player bets on either win or loss. If the bet is right, he wins amount of his bet. If the bet is wrong, he loses the bet. If the round is tied, nothing happens. The player with the more chips at the end of the 10 rounds wins.

=== Episodes 4, 5: Double-sided Poker ===
Players use a deck of cards with numbers on both sides. Each turn, dealer gives them a card front side up. Players glance what is on the back side of their card and bet on the side that they think has the most chance to win against whatever opponent will present. If they bet on front — they will present card as is, if they bet on back — they flip the card. If number is too low on both sides — player can just fold. They can also bet on both sides and if both sides are bigger than opponent's card, player gets extra 10 chips taken from opponent (on top of bet winnings).

=== Episodes 7, 12: Twelve Janggi ===
This is a simplified version of Korean chess (Janggi) played on a 3x4 board. Each player starts with a King, Man, Minister and General (with allowable movements shown on the respective pieces) in a symmetrical setup. The Man promotes to a Feudal Lord upon reaching the last rank, and captured pieces may be para-dropped back into the game. The setup of the game is similar to Dōbutsu Shōgi, with the difference that captured pieces may not be para-dropped onto the last rank. The player who checkmates the opponent or moves their King onto the last rank without being captured wins.

=== Episodes 8, 9: Memory Maze ===
Player start standing on two adjacent corners of a big 7x7 board and have to reach their destination on the other side of a board. Players take turns moving three steps from cell to cell in cardinal directions. A player can opt to use "Double Chance" once during the game, which allows them to move 6 steps in one turn.

The board has 32 imaginary walls placed between cells forming a maze. if player crosses that invisible wall, they hear a siren and have to go back to their initial position and wait for their next turn.

=== Episode 10: Monorail ===
Players are given 16 square tiles (excluding the two starting station tiles) with a straight line track on one face and a track with a 90-degree turn on the other face. Tiles can be placed showing either face and rotated. Players take turns placing their choice of any 1-3 adjacent tiles in a line, and at least one of the new tiles must be adjacent to an existing tile. All placed tiles have to be used as part of the looped track, although they do not necessarily need to connect with an existing track yet. The winner is the player who places the last tile/s that completes a looped track. Alternatively, instead of making a turn, player can announce that completing the looped track is now impossible with the placed tiles (due to the number of remaining tiles). The opponent is given a chance to complete the looped track with the remaining tiles, and loses if he/she is unable to do so.

=== Episode 11: Betting Black and White ===
This is a variant of Black and White from season 2. Players now are given 30 chips which they can bet on result of each of the 10 rounds of the game and the player with the most chips at the end wins. Players must bet at least one chip on each of the 10 rounds and they must use all of them. Bets and order of the tiles is predetermined by players before Deathmatch game starts.

When comparing each of the 10 tiles players' bets must be met. Player with lower bet has a choice. If they call they have to put enough additional chips from other bets or from chip winnings. If player wins the round — he takes both bets. Or player can fold, then he loses his bet and tiles are not revealed. If bets are already matched then tiles are revealed and compared right away.

=== Episode 12: Same Numbers Hunt ===
The final match consists of three games, with Same Numbers Hunt being the new game. The other two of which have been played in previous Death Matches were Twelve Janggi and Betting Rock, Paper, Scissors. Same Numbers Hunt is a memory and arithmetic game played on a board with 4x4 flip squares labelled with the letters A-P. Players are initially shown the back of all the 16 squares for 5 seconds and have to memorize them. The back of each labelled square contains a digit or math operator. The dealer then reveals a number picked randomly from a lotto machine and the player who buzzes in first has 5 seconds to call out the 3 lettered squares that would make up a valid expression (in the right order) that would get that number. The called out squares are flipped over to verify, before being flipped back again. Each correct answer gains 1 point, and an incorrect answer gives the opponent a chance to call out the answer without a time limit. Another number is then picked the lotto machine. The first player to reach 10 points wins the game.
