= Yoo Jung-hyun (politician) =

South Korean actor and politician (b. 1967)

- Born: October 24, 1967 (age 57); Seoul
- Occupation(s): Television personality, politician

Yoo Jung-hyun (Korean: 유정현; born October 24, 1967) is a South Korean television personality and politician. He was a cast member in the reality show The Genius: Rule Breaker and The Genius: Grand Final.
