= Park Eun-ji (television personality) =

South Korean television personality

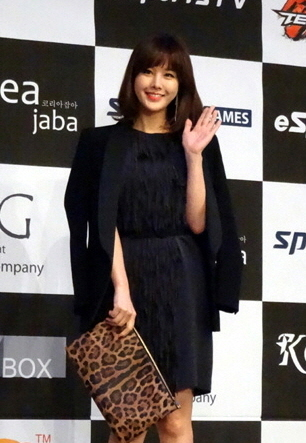
- Park in January 2015
- Born: May 20, 1983 (age 43); Seoul
- Occupations: Television personality; weather presenter
- Years active: 2005–present
- Agent: Ungbin ENS
- Website: egeepark.com

Park Eun-ji (Korean: 박은지; born May 20, 1983) is a South Korean television personality, actress and former weather presenter. She was a cast member in the reality dating show Match Made In Heaven (2015) & game show The Genius: Rules of the Game. (2013) She was also a weather presenter in the MBC Newsdesk.

== Filmography ==
=== Television ===
- Children of the 20th Century (MBC, 2017) cameo
- Cinderella with Four Knights (tvN, 2016)
- Don't Dare to Dream (SBS, 2016)
- All About My Mom (KBS2, 2015)
- Love Cells 2 (Naver TV Cast, 2015)
- Plus Nine Boys (tvN, 2014) cameo
- Flower Grandpa Investigation Unit (tvN, 2014)
- Potato Star 2013QR3 (tvN, 2013)
- The Dramatic (MBC Every1, 2013)
- The Secret of Birth (SBS, 2013)
- Standby (MBC, 2012)
- Me Too, Flower! (MBC, 2011) cameo

=== Film ===
- Love Forecast (2015)

=== Variety ===
- 2020: King of Mask Singer (MBC), contestant as "Surfer" (episode 267)
