= Society Game =

- Also known as: 소사이어티 게임
- Genre: Reality
- Created by: Dan Cazzola; Jung Jong-yeon
- Developed by: CJ E&M & Endemol Shine Group
- Country of origin: South Korea
- Original language: Korean
- No. of seasons: 2
- No. of episodes: 12

Production
- Producer: Jung Jong-yeon
- Running time: 140 minutes (Episode 1); 95 – 105 minutes (Episodes 2 – 12)

Original release
- Network: tvN
- Release: October 16, 2016 – January 1, 2017

Related
- Society Game 2; The Genius

The Society Game (Korean: 소사이어티 게임) is a South Korean reality TV series, and it was marketed as one of tvN's 10th Anniversary Special Global Project shows. Society Game is a mock society game show in a controlled village environment. 22 contestants compete against each other by staying in the village for a period of 14 days. If the contestants successfully complete the challenges given to them and survive until the end, the reward of a 150 million won (approximately US$111,000) would be given to them.

The Society Game is produced in collaboration with Endemol Shine Group, creators of Big Brother and MasterChef.

== Broadcasting time ==
=== Broadcast ===
Network	Episode	Broadcasting Dates	Broadcasting Time
tvN	Ep 1	October 16, 2016	Sun 9:00 – 11:20 PM (KST).
tvN	Ep 2 – 12	October 23, 2016 – January 1, 2017	Every Sun 9:15 – 11:00 PM (KST).

== Contestants ==
Name	Age	Background
Chae Ji-won	21	Student at Pohang University of Science and Technology, studying Industrial and Management Systems Engineering
Choi Seol-hwa	24	Ballet teacher and trainer; Kyung Hee University graduate in dance
Hong Sa-hyuk	30	Doctor; Medical PhD student at Seoul National University; Rapper
Hwang In-sun	30	Singer; Sungkyunkwan University graduate in dance/Masters graduate
Hyun Kyung-ryul	32	Start-up director; Seoul National University computer science PhD
Jang Han-byul	27	Singer; University of Queensland Dentistry dropout
Jung In-jik	26	Physical Education student at Seoul National University
Kim Hee-jun	30	English lecturer; University of Illinois at Urbana-Champaign sports management graduate / Seoul National University sports management Masters graduate
Kwon A-sol	31	Mixed martial artist; Ritsumeikan Asia Pacific University management dropout
Lee Byung-kwan / Steven Lee	29	Businessman; University of California, Riverside management graduate / Yonsei University management Masters graduate
Lee Hae-sung	25	Seoul National University management student
Lim Dong-hwan	30	Phone developer; Yonsei University mechanical engineering graduate
MJ Kim	26	Mixed martial artist
Oliver Jang	26	Model; Johns Hopkins University public health studies graduate
Park Ha-el	24	Korea University international affairs student
Park Seo-hyun	22	Yonsei University music composition student
Pharoh	32	Rapper; Kyonggi University sports management graduate
Shin Jae-hyuk	23	Model; Taking time off Seoul Culture Arts University modeling degree
Yang Ji-an	29	Party planner; Yonsei University clothing & textiles / journalism graduate
Yang Sang-guk	34	Comedian
Yoon Macho	30	Magazine editor; Seoul Mode Fashion Institute business graduate
Yoon Tae-jin	30	Announcer; Ewha Womans University dance graduate

== Rules ==
Society Game is a game show in which 22 contestants live in a custom-built "house" (an outdoor set) under constant video surveillance for 14 days. While in the house, the contestants are isolated from the outside world. Before the game begins, the contestants are first divided equally into two societies: Nop-dong (Green Team) and Ma-dong (Red Team). The two societies then live apart in two different areas in the house and are isolated from each other at all times besides the Team Challenge and Eviction Ceremony.

The "house" is circular in shape and is divided into three equal sections: Nop-Dong, Ma-Dong, and Neutral Zone. Neutral Zone is the connecting space between the two societies and the main entrance. This is also where Team Challenges and Eviction Ceremonies are held. The two living spaces for both teams are almost identical. Both have a Leader's bedroom, Storage, Cooking Area, Jail, and Bedroom. The Leader's Bedroom is the only air-conditioned room and the air-condition will be deactivated if anyone other the Leader enters the room. The only difference in both spaces is that in Ma-dong, there is a "Rebellion Room" and in Nop-dong, there is a "Voting Room". The "Rebellion Room" contains a gong in which a rebellion can be started and the "Voting Room" is where the contestants conduct a private vote.

Each day, the two societies compete against each other in the Team Challenge. The winning team will be awarded 10,000,000 won (approximately US$10,000) along with other rewards while the losing team will eliminate one member from their team and from the game during the Eviction Ceremony. At Eviction Ceremony, the winning team's Leader has the power to name a Blacklist Candidate. If one member's name is written twice, they are automatically evicted from the game.

At the end of two weeks, only three members from each society will remain and they will compete in the Final Challenge. If only 3 members remain in a society before the end of two weeks, there will be no more evictions from the team even if they lose the Team Challenge. However, if 4 or more members remain in a society by the end of two weeks, the final Leader will have to choose 2 members to join him/her to the Final Challenge while the unselected members will be evicted. The 3 members on the winning team of the Final Challenge will be crowned the winners.

Each society will also choose a Leader. The Leaders will enjoy luxuries including a personal air-conditioned bedroom and access to a personal safe. They also have the power to evict and the power to distribute monetary awards (i.e. prize money won in team challenges).

In Nop-dong (Green Team), the society is modeled as a democracy with all members having the right to vote and the right to be elected. At the beginning of each day, the members will elect a Leader through a secret ballot and the person with the most votes will become the Leader for the day. A maximum of three members can run for candidacy each election and the sitting Leader will automatically become a candidate for the next election. In the case of a tie in the votes, the sitting Leader will break the tie.

In Ma-dong (Red Team), the society is modeled as a totalitarian state with the Leader reigning indefinitely until he/she is "overthrown" in a "rebellion". The initial Leader is chosen through a challenge. However, subsequent Leaders are chosen after a successful "rebellion". At the beginning of their tenures as Leader, the Ma-dong leader must hand out 2 "Keys of Rebellion" to 2 members. Only the keyholders have the power to initiate a rebellion by sounding the gong in the Rebellion Room. If a majority of the members hits the gong within 30 minutes of the initial gong, the "rebellion" is successful. The current Leader will then be "overthrown" and replaced by the person who initiated the "rebellion".

=== Rule Changes in Season 2 ===
The following rule changes were made in season 2.

- Nop-dong Evictions would now be determined by a vote among all members of Nop-dong. In the event of a tie, the leader would cast a tie-breaker vote. The leader will have immunity from eviction.
- In the event of an unsuccessful rebellion in Ma-dong, the initiator will be blacklisted. This means that if their name has already been put on the blacklist, they will be evicted.

== Team Challenges ==
Episode One - Human Janggi (Human Chess)

Team Prize: 10,000,000 Korean won + additional 5 kg of personal belongings for team

Human Janggi Rules

Human Janggi (or Human Chess) is played on an 8-by-6 board which is divided into three levels. Each team has a set of 11 chess pieces numbered from 1 to 11. Each team then assigns a member who is in charge of moving their team's pieces. The remaining 10 members will each be assigned a number corresponding to their numbered chess pieces. The final, unchosen number will become the King. Each piece's identity is concealed at the beginning of the game. The first team that gets their King to opposite side of the board or reveals the opponent's King will win the Challenge.

On each team's turn, they can select one piece and move the piece for:
1) one or two spaces on the same floor, or
2) one space when moving up or down a floor.
When a piece moves up to an opponent's piece, the two pieces and their corresponding members are revealed. The two members then engage in a mini-game with the loser's piece eliminated from the board. The King has no defense ability, and once revealed, the King is eliminated. However, a piece cannot attack an opponent piece on a different floor.

There are three mini-games available: Physical, Mental, and Dexterity. The Physical Game (Statue Dropping) is where two players wrestle each other while tied to a mini-statue. The first to knock off their opponent's statue wins. The Mental Game is where two players solving a puzzle using the provided hints. The Dexterity Game is where two players face-off in a Ring Toss game.

The mini-game played is determined by combining the corresponding number of the two members facing off. If the sum of the numbers are:
10 or below = Mental Game
11 to 13 = Dexterity Game
14 or above = Physical Game

Human Janggi Results

– Match Winner

Bolded - Attacking Team

Match No.	Nop-dong Representative (No.)	Match Type (combined No.)	Ma-dong Representative (No.)
1	**Hong Sa-hyuk (2)**	Dexterity (13)	Kwon A-sol (11)
2	**Hong Sa-hyuk (2)**	Mental (7)	Yang Ji-An (5)
3	**Hong Sa-hyuk (2)**	Mental (6)	Lee Hae-sung (4)
4	Lim Dong-hwan (1)	Mental (2)	**Park Seo-hyun (1)**
5	**Pharoh (10)**	Physical (20)	Lee Byung-kwan (10)
6	**Yoon Macho (3)**	Dexterity (13)	Lee Byung-kwan (10)
7	Oliver Jang (6)	Mental (10)	**Lee Hae-sung (4)**
8	Kim Hee-jun (5)	Physical (14)	**Jang In-jik (9)**
9	Hwang In-sun (8)	Physical (17)	**Jang In-jik (9)**
10	**Shin Jae-hyuk (9)**	Physical (15)	Han-byul (6)
11	MJ Kim (7)	Physical (16)	**Jang In-jik (9)**
12	King (11)	**Game Ended**	**Han-byul (6)**
**Final Results**	**LOSE**		**WIN**

Pre-Challenge Mini-Game

Mini-Game

A representative from each society competes in a trial run of the Team Challenge. The winning team will be awarded a chest containing a special prize.

Special Prize: Ice and Watermelon

Winning Team: Ma-dong

Episode Two - Round Table of Suffering

Team Prize: 10,000,000 Korean won + Ice Cream

Round Table of Suffering Rules

Round Table of Suffering is a game that requires both physical and mental capabilities. Each team will designate three members on their team as the "table lifters" and their role is to lift up and hold an 80 kg platform with eggs placed beneath the platform. The remaining members will be participating in a mental math challenge; table lifters will not participate in the challenge.

In the mental math challenge portion, each member will be provided a 6-sided die with numbers 1 to 6 labeled on each face. In each round, an arithmetic equation (i.e. 1 + 1) with a final solution of either 1,2,3,4,5 or 6 will be shown on the screen. A 3-second countdown will ensue in which all participating members will answer the equation by showing the correct face on the dice away from them. If a member answers incorrectly, or if a member fails to lock in an answer in time, it will be deemed as an incorrect answer.

For every incorrect answer by a member in the mental math challenge, a 5 kg bag will be placed on the platform of their corresponding team and increase the total weight carried by the table lifters. The first team to drop their platform and crush the eggs beneath will lose.

Round Table of Suffering Results

Round No.	Question	Answer	Members with Incorrect Answer	Nop-dong Platform Weight (after round)	Ma-dong Platform Weight (after round)
1	2 + 2	4	(none)	80 kg (base platform weight)	
2	2 + 4	6	Yoon Macho (OT)	**85 kg**	80 kg
3	6 – 1	5	Yoon Macho (OT)	**90 kg**	80 kg
4	4 – 2	2	Yoon Macho (OT)	**95 kg**	80 kg
5	11 – 8	3	Yoon Macho (WA)	**100 kg**	80 kg
6	12 – 6	6	Yoon Macho (WA)	**105 kg**	80 kg
7	14 – 8	6	Yoon Macho (WA)	**110 kg**	80 kg
8	19 – 15	4	Yoon Macho (OT), Shin Jae-hyuk (OT)	**120 kg**	80 kg
9	10 ÷ 2	5	Yoon Macho (OT)	**125 kg**	80 kg
10	4 ÷ 4	1	Hwang In-sun (OT)	**130 kg**	80 kg
11	5 – 1	4	(none)	130 kg	80 kg
12	11 – 7	4	Kim Hee-jun (OT)	**135 kg**	80 kg
13	36 ÷ 6	6	Yoon Macho (OT)	**140 kg**	80 kg
14	48 ÷ 8	6	Oliver Jang (WA)	**145 kg**	80 kg
15	13 – 7	6	Yoon Macho (OT), Choi Seol-hwa (WA)	**150 kg**	**85 kg**
16	54 ÷ 9	6	Yoon Macho (WA), Park Seo-hyun (WA)	**155 kg**	**90 kg**
17	28 ÷ 7	4	Shin Jae-hyuk (WA)	**160 kg**	90 kg
18	54 ÷ 9	6	Yoon Macho (OT), Shin Jae-hyuk (WA)	**170 kg**	90 kg
**Final Results**				**LOSE**	**WIN**

OT = Answered over time limit
WA = Presented wrong answer

Players	Yoon Macho	Shin Jae-hyuk	Hwang In-sun	Kim Hee-jun	Oliver Jang	Choi Seol-hwa	Park Seo-hyun
No. of errors	**12** (60 kg)	**3** (15 kg)	**1** (5 kg)	**1** (5 kg)	**1** (5 kg)	**1** (5 kg)	**1** (5 kg)

Pre-Challenge Mini-Game

Mini-Game

A representative from each society competes in a sudden death match of mental challenge portion of the Team Challenge. The winning team will be awarded a chest containing a special prize.

Special Prize: Cooking Oil

Winning Team: Ma-dong

Episode Three - Five-Legged Race

Team Prize: 10,000,000 Korean won + Fresh Fruits (Peaches and Grapes)

Five-Legged Race Rules

Each team will send out 4 members, each assigned a number from 1 to 4, every round to compete head-to-head in a relay. 4 straps will be used to strap the left leg of one member to the right leg of another runner. There are also two stations, one located on each end of a 10 m path. On one end, the station is a ring toss challenge and on the other end, the station is a Tangram challenge.

The team will start by running 10 m from one end of the raceway to the other with a cap on the first member's head. The first member will then solve a Tangram puzzle presented at the station. After completing the puzzle, he/she will raise a flag signaling completion, if successful, the first member will pass the cap to the second member and the team will run down the 10 m path back to reach the second station. The second member will then engage in a ring toss. After one successful toss, the cap will be passed to the third member and they will run back to the first station to complete a second Tangram puzzle. After completion, the cap will be passed to the fourth and final member, in which they will run back to the second station. After the final member makes a successful throw, the team completes the relay. The fastest team to successfully complete the relay will win the round.

The Team Challenge will be determined in a best of 3 rounds and the first team to win 2 rounds will win the challenge.

Five-Legged Race Results

Nop-dong Players Roster	Nop-dong Score	Match Number	Ma-dong Score	Ma-dong Players Roster
Oliver Jang (1), Lim Dong-hwan (2), MJ Kim (3), Pharoh (4)	**1**	1	0	Lee Hae-sung (1), Jang In-jik (2), Choi Seol-hwa (3), Kwon A-sol (4)
Oliver Jang (1), Lim Dong-hwan (2), MJ Kim (3), Kim Hee-jun (4)	**2**	2	0	Park Ha-el (1), Lee Byung-kwan (2), Choi Seol-hwa (3), Yang Sang-guk (4)
(not necessary)	-	3	-	(not necessary)
**WIN**	**2**		**0**	**LOSE**

Pre-Challenge Mini-Game

Mini-Game

A representative from each society competes in a head-to-head Tangram puzzle challenge. The winning team will be awarded a chest containing a special prize.

Special Prize: Chili Paste

Winning Team: Ma-dong

Episode Four - Floor Removal

Team Prize: 10,000,000 Korean won + Ice Coffee & Ice Cream Cake

Floor Removal Rules

Each society starts off with 100 square blocks and 6 people will be chosen to stand on each society's blocks. The remaining residents have to look at the number board on the screen and find multiplication equations.

The numbers are shown in a 5 by 5 matrix table. The equations can be formed using numbers that go left to right, right to left, top to bottom, bottom to top, and diagonally, but the order of the numbers may not be changed. Each team will stand in alternating positions, and each player will be given 10 seconds to find a multiplication equation and answer.

If answered incorrectly or not answered within the time limit, the answer is marked incorrect. If one player answers correctly twice in one round, the round will end. When a round ends, a block will be removed for each society's incorrect answers. The quizzes and floor removal will continue until a team is no longer able to stand on the shrinking floor. If a part of a someone's body touches the ground, their society will lose and the game will end.

Floor Removal Results

Players	Oliver Jang	Hong Sa-hyuk	Lee Hae-sung	Lim Dong-hwan	Jang In-jik	Han-byul	Hyun Kyung-ryul
No. of errors	**8**	**9**	**14**	**15**	**10**	**11**	**8**

Winning Team: Nop-dong

Pre-Challenge Mini-Game

Mini-Game

The winning team will be awarded a chest containing a special prize.

Special Prize: Tennis balls + Targets (Aid for future challenges)

Winning Team: Nop-dong

Episode Five - Number Climbing

Team Prize: 10,000,000 Korean won + Kimchi

Number Climbing Rules
Number Climbing Results

Winning Team: Nop-dong

Pre-Challenge Mini-Game

Mini-Game

The winning team will be awarded a chest containing a special prize.

Special Prize: ???

Episode Six - Foul Ball

Team Prize: 10,000,000 Korean won + Ramen

Foul Ball Rules
Foul Ball Results

Winning Team: Nop-dong

Pre-Challenge Mini-Game

Mini-Game

The winning team will be awarded a chest containing a special prize.

Special Prize: ???

Episode Seven - Indomitable Runner

Team Prize: 10,000,000 Korean won + Mini Fridge

Indomitable Runner Rules

Each team will select 3 runners to run on the treadmills. The remaining members will participate in hitting targets. Whenever a team knocks down a target, they may choose one of the opposing team's treadmills to speed up.

There are a total of 7 speed settings for the treadmills (8 km/h, 10 km/h, 12 km/h, 13 km/h, 14 km/h, 15 km/h, 16 km/h). After both societies throw their balls and choose a treadmill to speed up, the speeds will be increased simultaneously. The game continues like this until all three runners on a team are eliminated, resulting in that team's loss.

Indomitable Runner Results

Winner: Nop-dong

Pre-Challenge Mini-Game

Mini-Game

A representative from each society competes to be the first to knock down 4 targets in a line. The winning team will be awarded a chest containing a special prize.

Special Prize: Dice (Aid for future challenges)

Winning Team: Nop-dong

Episode Eight - Lumberjack

Team Prize: 10,000,000 Korean won + ???

Lumberjack Rules
Lumberjack Results

Winning Team: Ma-dong

Pre-Challenge Mini-Game

Mini-Game

The winning team will be awarded a chest containing a special prize.

Special Prize: ???

== Episodes ==
Day Number	Challenge	Original Air Date
Day 1	none	October 16, 2016
The 22 contestants entered the House. They were told that they will divide into two equal teams, Ma-dong and Nop-dong, and a Preliminary Test will determine the order in which they will choose their teams. The better ranking they achieved, the earlier they can choose their team. There were 3 types of challenges available: Mental, Physical, or Dexterity. Mental Test involved memorizing a sequence of colours. Physical Test involved a timed trial for transporting 5 kg bags from the start point back to a platform. Dexterity Test involved a ring toss game. After determining the teams, they were told that they can only keep 5 kg of personal belongings (extra 3 kg for the 3 Preliminary Test winners) and bring it with them into their quarters. Each team must stay in their respective quarters at all times unless otherwise stated. The 22 players are sorted into two societies. As the residents start to settle in, members start to conspire and set sight on their targets. Preliminary Results (Day 1): Ranking / Mental / Physical / Dexterity; 1 / Park Seo-hyun / Choi Seol-hwa / Kwon A-sol; 2 / Yang Sang-guk / MJ Kim / Kim Hee-Jun; 3 / Oliver Jang / Lee Byung-kwan / Yoon Macho; 4 / Lee Hae-sung / Lim Dong-hwan / Yang Ji-an; 5 / Hong Sa-hyuk / Hwang In-sun / Yoon Tae-jin; 6 / Chae Ji-won / Pharoh / Shin Jae-hyuk; 7 / Hyun Kyung-ryul / Jung In-jik / Park Ha-el; 8 / (none) / / Han-byul; – Female contestants In Ma-dong, Yang Sang-guk quickly gathers the first 4 residents to form a secret majority alliance in hopes to control the society. As the day progresses, the society slows divides into two major alliances as they try to become the majority. In Nop-dong, members discuss who they should elect as leader tomorrow and Pharoh volunteers to be the 1st leader.
Day 2	Human Janggi (Human Chess)	October 16, 2016
In Ma-dong, Lee Hae-sung became the first Leader after successfully completing the Leader's Challenge. He handed out one of the two Keys of Rebellion to his ally, Jang In-jik, and the other to Yang Sang-guk against his allies' wishes. Later that day, Yang Sang-guk discovers Lee Hae-sung's plan to target his alliance from Hyun Kyung-ryul. He then initiates a rebellion, which was further supported by 5 other members. Gaining majority support, his rebellion is successful and he becomes the new Leader. The society is now split between those who supported the rebellion and those who did not. However, distrust starts to build within the majority alliance. In the Eviction Ceremony, Kang Sang-guk decides to divide the prize money equally to all the members besides himself and decides not to nominate a blacklist candidate. In Nop-dong, Pharoh, Kim Hee-jun, and Yoon Macho ran for leadership with Pharoh receiving the majority of votes (6 votes) and becomes the first Leader (against Kim Hee-jun's 4 votes and Yoon Macho's 1 vote). It is then revealed that Oliver Jang rallied for Pharoh's election to create an excuse to justify eliminating Pharoh in the future. By allowing Pharoh to become leader, Oliver sees it as an opportunity to expose Pharoh as an ineffective and expendable member. Following their defeat in the Team Challenge, Oliver Jang and Shin Jae-hyuk plots to vote Hong Sa-hyuk as leader tomorrow in order to eliminate Pharoh. Pharoh decides to hold private sessions with each member to seek out public opinion on who they would like to see evicted. In the meantime, Oliver Jang cites Pharoh's lacklustre performance and attempts to convince the group to eliminate Pharoh tomorrow. His speech is overheard by Yoon Ma-cho, Pharoh's secret ally, who delivers the news to Pharoh. Ultimately, at the Eviction Ceremony, Pharoh decides to eliminate Yoon Tae-jin, who was the majority's choice to evict. Eviction Opinion Poll: Society / Players / Yoon Tae-jin / Oliver Jang; Nop-dong / Votes Received / 6 / 1; Nop-dong / Voted by / Oliver Jang, Shin Jae-hyuk; MJ Kim, Hwang In-sun; Kim Hee-jun, Lim Dong Hwan / Yoon Macho; Chae Ji-won, Yoon Tae-jin and Hong Sa-hyuk's decision has not been revealed. Chae Ji-won chose to nominate Pharoh, who is ineligible for eviction. End Narration "If a group you belonged to needed a scapegoat, who would you choose? If it was me, I would choose neither friend nor foe, but the person whose sacrifice would make no one angry or sad."
Day 3	Round Table of Suffering	October 23, 2016
In Ma-dong, Yang Sang-guk checks his safe and discovers a bottle of sparkling water and a letter with a piece of paper that has "12/13" printed on it. It is then revealed that on Day 2, Lee Hae-sung and Yang Sang-guk had a secret agreement to not evict each other. Lee Hae-sung also forms a Final 3 alliance with Yang Sang-guk and Kwon A-sol. In order to gain absolute control of the society, they plan to get Choi Seol-hwa (a Key of Rebellion holder) to start a rebellion so Yang Sang-guk can reassign the Key to Lee Hae-sung when it fails. However, Lee Hae-sung reveals to his ally Jang In-jik of his ultimate plan to allow Choi Seol-hwa's rebellion to be successful, get the Key from her and start a rebellion immediately after to regain leadership. Park Ha-el, Lee Hae-sung's ally, attempts to persuade Choi Seol-hwa to use the Key of Rebellion by lying that Yang Sang-guk wants to evict all the female players first. She cites that the society is currently split 6 to 5 and if Seol-hwa decides to rebel, she has enough support to be successful. However, in the event that they lose the Team Challenge, the one member of the minority alliance will be evicted and Seol-hwa will lose the chance to rebel. In the Eviction Ceremony, it is revealed that Yang Sang-guk split the prize money equally with all members except Kwon A-sol, who received $0. He also does not nominate a blacklist candidate. In Nop-dong, Oliver Jang continues to rally members to vote for Hong Sa-Hyuk in his attempt to evict Pharoh. Kim Hee-jun, Pharoh, and Hong Sa-Hyuk decides to run for candidacy. However, when the votes are revealed, Kim Hee-jun wins the majority with 6 votes (compared to Hong's 4 votes and Pharoh's 0 vote). Oliver Jang and Hong Sa-Hyuk's alliance is shocked at the results but is now convinced that there is another alliance. It is revealed that a majority of the members were wary of Oliver's schemes and decided to keep him in check by voting against his wishes. After losing the Team Challenge, the society is focused on finding out who is responsible for their loss. All fingers are pointing at Yoon Macho, but he deflects the blame from himself by saying that he only made a few mistakes. However, some members see through his lies. Pharoh and Yoon Macho schemes to keep them both safe for the eviction by pushing the eviction of Oliver Jang, another popular candidate for eviction. Kim Hee-jun asks each member to write down their choice for eviction anonymously and the majority votes in favour of evicting Yoon Macho. However, in the Eviction Ceremony, Kim Hee-jun surprises his society by eliminating Shin Jae-hyuk... Eviction Opinion Poll: Society / Players / Yoon Macho / Oliver Jang / Shin Jae-hyuk; Nop-dong / Votes Received / 5 / 3 / 1; Nop-dong / Voted by / Oliver Jang, Shin Jae-hyuk; Hong Sa-hyuk, Hwang In-sun, Chae Ji-won / Yoon Macho, MJ Kim; Pharoh / Lim Dong-hwan; End Narration "A leader created by the people's votes, ignored the votes of his people and made his own decision for the elimination. Disregarding whether that decision was right or wrong. I think a question mark has been raised over how long the leader's authority will last."
Day 4	Five-Legged Race	October 30, 2016
End Narration With Ji-an's elimination, the 5-person alliance led by Hae-sung has become a 4-person alliance. The hopes of four bright and lively youths are fading. As these hopes fade, Ma-dong's troubles and the leader's troubles grow..."
Day 5	Floor Removal	November 6, 2016
End Narration Oliver always said to others about eliminating someone together, but the people that have a conversation with Oliver will think that one day Oliver will turn his back against them, and that's make Oliver a dangerous player..."
Day 6	Number Climbing	November 13, 2016
End Narration Happiness of victory, make people not having a clear vision on some conflicts and arguments. They will show up along with failure at any time, and just like a war, everything will turn upside down..."

== Result chart ==
Prize money was distributed in units of one million won (₩1M). Team challenges initially earned the winning team ₩10M, distributed by the team leader per their wishes. Later challenges increased the prize to ₩15M (as on Day 10), ₩20M (as on Days 12 and 13).

Color key
– Nop-dong
– Ma-dong

Episode	1	2	3	4	5	6	7	8	9	10	11	12		
Day(s)	1-2	3	4	5	6	7	8	9	10	11-12	13	14		14 (Finale)
Mini-game winner	Ma-dong	Ma-dong	Ma-dong	Nop-dong	Nop-dong (Note: For winning the mini-game, Nop-dong members were able to buy lottery tickets for ₩1M. Yoon Macho won the top prize of a ₩6M payout while Pharoh did not win any money; all other participating members received ₩1M.)	Ma-dong (Note: For winning the mini-game, Ma-dong was given the mission to place a member in jail, collectively earning ₩1M for every hour they were imprisoned. Ha-el lasted eight hours, earning the team ₩8M, which was distributed amongst the team on Day 8.)	Nop-dong	Nop-dong	Ma-dong	Ma-dong	Ma-dong	(none)		
Team challenge winner	Ma-dong	Ma-dong	Nop-dong	Nop-dong	Nop-dong	Nop-dong	Nop-dong	Ma-dong	Nop-dong	Ma-dong	Ma-dong	Nop-dong	Ma-dong	Ma-dong
Winning leader	~~Hae-sung~~; Sang-guk	Sang-guk	Hee-jun	MJ	MJ	MJ	MJ	Byung-kwan	Macho	Byung-kwan	~~Byung-kwan~~; ~~Kyung-ryul~~; In-jik	~~In-jik~~ Kyung-ryul		
Blacklist candidate	(none)	(none)	Sa-hyuk	Dong-hwan	Hee-jun	Hee-jun	Dong-hwan	Hae-sung	Sa-hyuk	(none)	(none)	(none)		
Losing leader	Pharoh	Hee-jun	Sang-guk	Sang-guk	~~Sang-guk~~; Hae-sung	Hae-sung	~~Hae-sung~~; Byung-kwan	MJ	Byung-kwan	Macho	Pharoh (Note: Pharoh used the leader nameplate to automatically win that day's election.)	MJ		
Evicted	Tae-jin	Jae-hyuk	Ji-an	Oliver	Seol-hwa	Sang-guk	Ha-el	Ji-won	Seo-hyun	Hanbyul	Macho	In-sun, Hae-sung		MJ, Pharoh, A-sol
Byung-kwan	₩1M	₩2M	₩2M	₩2M	₩2M	₩2M	₩3M	₩6M	₩6M	₩12M	₩22M	Finale		Winner (2:1) ₩48M
In-jik	₩1M	₩2M	₩2M	₩2M	₩2M	₩2M	₩3M	₩5M	₩5M	₩10M	₩16M	Finale		Winner (2:1) ₩48M
Kyung-ryul	₩1M	₩2M	₩2M	₩2M	₩2M	₩2M	₩3M	₩4M	₩4M	₩8M	₩10M	Finale		Winner (2:1) ₩48M
MJ	₩0	₩0	₩2M	₩2M	₩3M	₩4M	₩5M	₩5M	₩15M	₩15M	₩15M	Finale		Runner-Up (1:2)
Pharoh	₩0	₩0	₩1M	₩2M	₩2M	₩4M	₩6M	₩6M	₩8M	₩8M	₩8M	Finale		Runner-Up (1:2)
A-sol	₩1M	₩1M	₩1M	₩1M	₩1M	₩1M	₩2M	₩4M	₩5M	₩5M	₩5M	Finale		Runner-Up (1:2)
In-sun	₩0	₩0	₩1M	₩2M	₩3M	₩4M	₩6M	₩6M	₩6M	₩6M	₩6M	Not chosen		EVICTED
Hae-sung	₩1M	₩2M	₩2M	₩2M	₩2M	₩2M	₩3M	₩3M	₩3M	₩8M	₩10M	Not chosen		EVICTED
Macho	₩0	₩0	₩1M	₩3M	₩9M	₩10M	₩9M (Note: Yoon Macho spent ₩2M at an auction to win a special meal.)	₩9M	₩9M	₩9M	₩9M	EVICTED		
Hanbyul	₩1M	₩2M	₩2M	₩3M	₩5M	₩6M	₩7M	₩7M	₩8M	₩8M	EVICTED			
Sa-hyuk	₩0	₩0	₩1M	₩2M	₩3M	₩4M	₩5M	₩5M	₩6M	BLACKLISTED				
Seo-hyun	₩1M	₩2M	₩2M	₩2M	₩2M	₩2M	₩3M	₩5M	₩5M	EVICTED				
Ji-won	₩0	₩0	₩1M	₩2M	₩3M	₩4M	₩5M	₩5M	EVICTED					
Dong-hwan	₩0	₩0	₩1M	₩2M	₩3M	₩4M	₩5M	BLACKLISTED						
Ha-el	₩1M	₩2M	₩2M	₩2M	₩2M	₩2M	₩4M	EVICTED						
Hee-jun	₩0	₩0	₩1M	₩3M	₩4M	₩5M	BLACKLISTED							
Sang-guk	₩0	₩1M	₩1M	₩1M	₩1M	₩1M	EVICTED							
Seol-hwa	₩1M	₩2M	₩2M	₩2M	₩2M	EVICTED								
Oliver	₩0	₩0	₩1M	₩1M	EVICTED									
Ji-an	₩1M	₩2M	₩2M	EVICTED										
Jae-hyuk	₩0	₩0	EVICTED											
Tae-jin	₩0	EVICTED												

== Ratings ==
In the ratings below, the highest rating for the show will be in red, and the lowest rating for the show will be in blue.

Episode	Original airdate	AGB	TNms
1	October 16, 2016	1.263%	1.2%
2	October 23, 2016	1.144%	1.1%
3	October 30, 2016	0.831%	0.8%
4	November 6, 2016	0.714%	0.7%
5	November 13, 2016	0.848%	0.8%
6	November 20, 2016	0.736%	0.8%
7	November 27, 2016	0.613%	0.6%
8	December 4, 2016	0.660%	1.2%
9	December 11, 2016	0.926%	0.9%
10	December 18, 2016	1.017%	0.9%
11	December 25, 2016	0.575%	0.8%
12	January 1, 2017	0.745%	0.8%
