= Agents of Mystery =

South Korean reality competition show

- Promotional poster
- Hangul: 미스터리 수사단
- RR: Miseuteori susadan
- MR: Misŭt'ŏri susadan
- Genre: Reality competition; Game show
- Created by: Jung Jong-yeon
- Written by: Jung Da-hee; Heo Jeong-hee
- Directed by: Jung Jong-yeon
- Country of origin: South Korea
- Original language: Korean
- No. of seasons: 2
- No. of episodes: 15

Production
- Running time: 40–51 minutes
- Production company: TEO

Original release
- Network: Netflix
- Release: June 18, 2024 – present

Agents of Mystery (Korean: 미스터리 수사단) is a South Korean reality competition show broadcast by Netflix.

Season 2 was announced by Netflix on August 7, 2025 with Gabee, a South Korean dancer, choreographer, and broadcaster joining Lee Yong-jin, John Park, Lee Hye-ri, Kim Do-hoon, and Karina. In September 2025, Netflix announced the second season would debut in February 2026. Season 2 was released on Netflix on February 27, 2026, and the setting was expanded outdoors.

== Synopsis ==
Six contestants made up of popular Korean celebrities work together to solve mysteries and complete occult-themed missions as secret agents.

== Contestants ==
There are six contestants per season:

- Lee Yong-jin, comedian and singer, known for his work on the tvN sketch comedy show Comedy Big League
- John Park, Korean-American singer, semi-finalist on American Idol season 9 and runner-up on Superstar K2
- Lee Eun-ji, comedian, known for being a judge on Miss Trot and Mr. Trot, and part of the Earth Arcade series cast (Season 1)
- Lee Hye-ri, actress, singer, and model, member of the girl group Girl's Day and a fixed cast member on Real Man
- Kim Do-hoon, actor known for his roles in Moving, Today's Webtoon, and The Escape of the Seven
- Karina, singer, rapper and leader of the K-pop girl group Aespa
- Gabee, South Korean dancer, choreographer, and broadcaster (Season 2)

== Episode list ==
Each season is divided into several missions, each spanning three episodes.

| Season | Episodes | Originally released |
|---|---|---|
| 1 | 6 | June 18, 2024 |
| 2 | 9 | February 27, 2026 |

=== Season 1 (2024) ===
Agents of Mystery episodes
| No. overall | No. in season | Title | Original release date |
|---|---|---|---|
| 1 | 1 | "The Followers of the Evil One Part 1" | June 18, 2024 |
Six celebrities embark on their initial task: to explore an abandoned facility that might be connected to three missing women, rescue them, and evade capture.
| 2 | 2 | "The Followers of the Evil One Part 2" | June 18, 2024 |
The team discovers a detained reporter whose notes provide clues about a sinister cult. They must decipher a code to unlock an encrypted video.
| 3 | 3 | "The Followers of the Evil One Part 3" | June 18, 2024 |
An apparition warns the operatives of an impending disastrous ritual. As they risk capture, can they thwart the cultists in time and save the women?
| 4 | 4 | "The Deep Sea Mystery Part 1" | June 18, 2024 |
The operatives need to investigate a submarine where the bio-signals of five crew members have vanished, leaving only one unreliable signal, and secure the data drives.
| 5 | 5 | "The Deep Sea Mystery Part 2" | June 18, 2024 |
With oxygen levels on the submarine depleting, the solution rests on an unknown password. Meanwhile, a startling truth about the crew members' demise comes to light.
| 6 | 6 | "The Deep Sea Mystery Part 3" | June 18, 2024 |
While the operatives search for the data drives, an anomaly draws nearer. As time ticks away, will they manage to avoid the impending danger?

=== Season 2 (2026) ===
Agents of Mystery episodes
| No. overall | No. in season | Title | Original release date |
|---|---|---|---|
| 7 | 1 | "Black Room Part 1" | February 27, 2026 |
| 8 | 2 | "Black Room Part 2" | February 27, 2026 |
| 9 | 3 | "Black Room Part 3" | February 27, 2026 |
| 10 | 4 | "The Others Part 1" | February 27, 2026 |
| 11 | 5 | "The Others Part 2" | February 27, 2026 |
| 12 | 6 | "The Others Part 3" | February 27, 2026 |
| 13 | 7 | "The Cursed Reservoir Part 1" | February 27, 2026 |
| 14 | 8 | "The Cursed Reservoir Part 2" | February 27, 2026 |
| 15 | 9 | "The Cursed Reservoir Part 3" | February 27, 2026 |

== Production ==
Showrunner Jung Jong-yeon said he and the staff members did their best to make the situations as realistic as possible, even using saltwater for water droplets falling from the ceiling, in case one of the cast members tasted it.

== Reception ==
Melissa Camacho reviewing for Common Sense Media gave the series a score of three out of five. Jack Seale from The Guardian rated the series 3 out of 5. Sreeparna Sengupta of The Times of India gave the series 2.5/5 stars.

The series was reviewed by Ayushi Agrawal for Pinkvilla and Joel Keller for Decider.
