= Shin A-young =

South Korean television personality

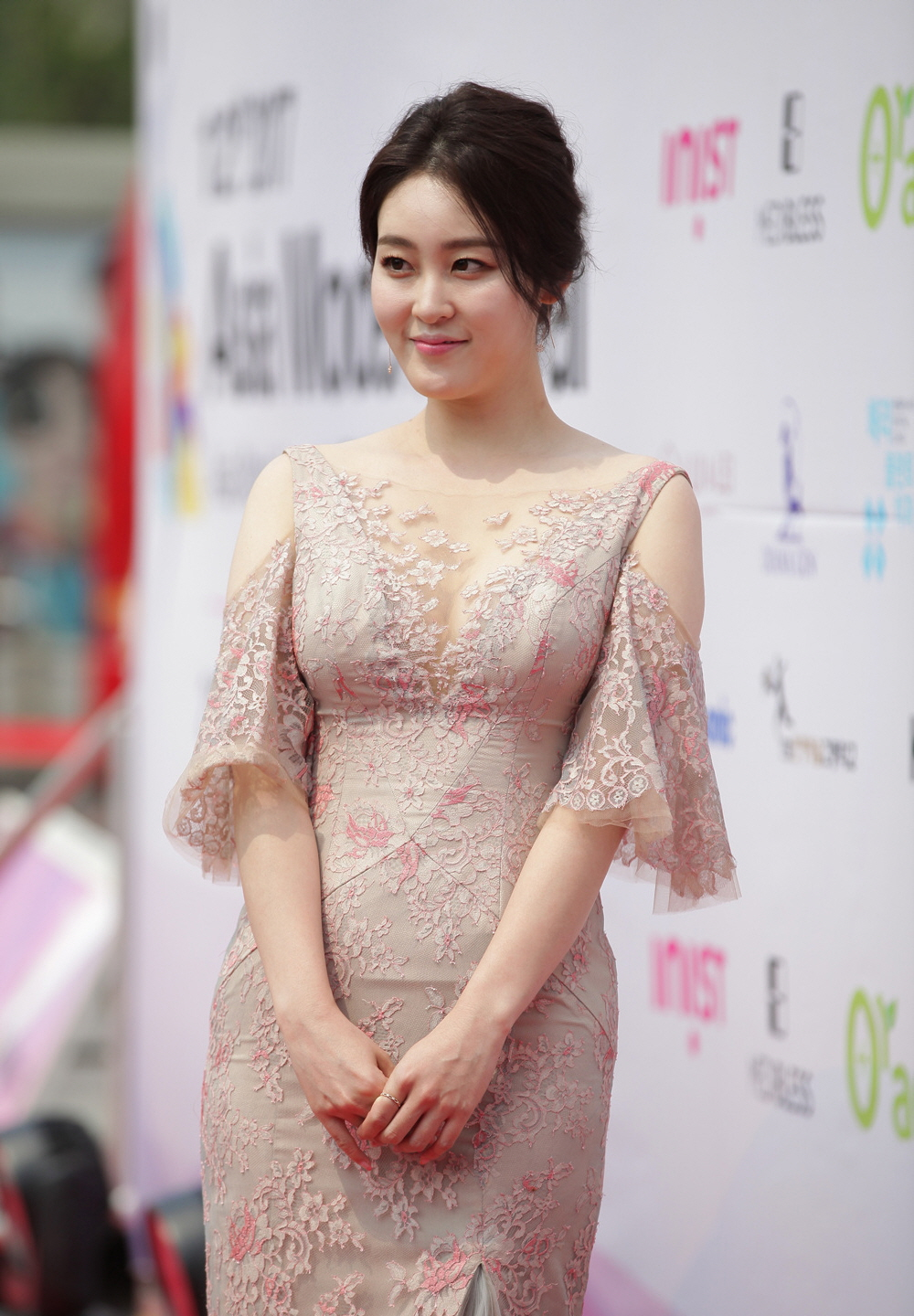
- Born: February 18, 1987 (age 38); Gwacheon, South Korea
- Occupation(s): Television personality, announcer
- Years active: 2005–present
- Agent: New-able

Korean name
- Hangul: 신아영
- Hanja: 申雅英
- RR: Sin Ayeong
- MR: Sin Ayŏng
- Website: Shin A-young on Twitter

Shin A-young (Korean: 신아영; born February 18, 1987) is a South Korean television personality and announcer. She was a cast member in the reality show The Genius: Black Garnet. She is also an alumna of Harvard University.

On December 22, 2018, Shin married her husband who is also an alumnus of Harvard University and works in the financial industry.

== Filmography ==
| Year | Show | Network | Remarks |
|---|---|---|---|
| 2014 | The Genius: Black Garnet | tvN | Eliminated in Episode 8 |
| 2015 | The Genius: Grand Final | tvN | Guest appearance in Episode 9 |
| 2015 | 2015 Mnet Asian Music Awards | Mnet | Host |
| 2016 | God of Music 2 | Mnet | Cameo Appearance |
| 2016 | Weightlifting Fairy Kim Bok Joo | MBC | Cameo Appearance, as announcer |
| 2019 | Busted! 2 | Netflix | Cameo Appearance in Episode 4 |
| 2020 | I-Land | Mnet | Co-host in Episode 12 |
