= The Genius: Rules of the Game =

- Promotional poster
- Winner: Hong Jin-ho
- No. of episodes: 12

Release
- Original network: tvN
- Original release: April 26 – July 12, 2013

Season chronology
- Next → The Genius: Rule Breaker

The Genius: Rules of the Game (더 지니어스: 게임의 법칙) is the first season of The Genius debuted on tvN on April 26, 2013.

== Cast ==
(in alphabetical order)

- Ch'a Min-su
- Cha Yu-ram
- Choi Chang-yeop
- Choi Jung-moon
- Hong Jin-ho
- Kim Gura
- Kim Kyung-ran
- Kim Min-seo
- Kim Poong
- Kim Sung-kyu
- Lee Jun-seok
- Lee Sang-min
- Park Eun-ji

== Game summary ==
Episode				Winner(s)	Awarded Immunity	Death Match Players		Death Match	Death Match outcome	
#	Airdate	Main Match		Winner(s)	Awarded Immunity	Main Match Loser	Challenged	Death Match	Winner	Eliminated
1	26 April 2013	1,2,3 Game		Hong Jin-ho; Kim Sung-Gyu	—N/a	Kim Min-Seo	Lee Jun-seok	Winning Streak	Kim Min-Seo	Lee Jun-seok
2	3 May 2013	Election Game		Choi Chang-Yeop	Park Eun-ji	Cha Yu-Ram	Kim Min-Seo	Winning Streak	Cha Yu-Ram	Kim Min-Seo
3	10 May 2013	Abundance & Famine		Kim Kyung-Ran	Choi Chang-yeop	Kim Sung-Gyu	Cha Min-Soo	Tactical Yutnori	Kim Sung-Gyu	Cha Min-Soo
4	17 May 2013	Zombie Game		Hong Jin-ho; Cha Yu-Ram; Kim Kyung-Ran; Lee Sang-Min; Kim Poong	—N/a	Choi Jung-Moon	Choi Chang-Yeop	Tactical Yutnori	Choi Jung-Moon	Choi Chang-Yeop
5	24 May 2013	Scamming Horse Race		Kim Kyung-Ran	Lee Sang-min	Cha Yu-Ram	Choi Jung-Moon	Winning Streak	Cha Yu-Ram	Choi Jung-Moon
6	31 May 2013	Catch the Thief		Kim Sung-Gyu; Cha Yu-Ram; Park Eun-Ji	—N/a	Hong Jin-ho	Kim Gu-Ra	Indian Poker	Hong Jin-ho	Kim Gu-Ra
7	7 June 2013	Open, Pass		Hong Jin-ho	Kim Sung-kyu	Kim Poong	Park Eun-Ji	Indian Poker	Park Eun-Ji	Kim Poong
8	14 June 2013	Kong's Dilemma		Kim Sung-Gyu	Hong Jin-ho	Cha Yu-Ram	Park Eun-Ji	Image Game	Park Eun-Ji	Cha Yu-Ram
9	21 June 2013	Expression Auction		Kim Sung-Gyu	Lee Sang-min	Hong Jin-ho	Park Eun-Ji	Indian Poker	Hong Jin-ho	Park Eun-Ji
10^{1}	28 June 2013	Confined! Scamming; Horse Race		Lee Sang-Min; Kim Kyung-Heon^{1}	Kim Kyung-ran^{1}	Hong Jin-ho; Kim Sung-Gyu^{2}		Tactical Yutnori	Hong Jin-ho	Kim Sung-Gyu
11	5 July 2013	5:5 Game		Hong Jin-ho	-	Lee Sang-Min; Kim Kyung-Ran^{2}		Same Picture Hunt	Kim Kyung-Ran	Lee Sang-Min
12	5 July 2013	Final Match	Round 1	Winner	Round 2	Winner	Round 3	Winner	Runner-up	Genius Champion
12	5 July 2013	Final Match	Indian Poker	Hong Jin-ho	Gyul!Hap!	Hong Jin-ho	Same Picture Hunt	N/A	Kim Kyung-Ran	Hong Jin-ho

Footnotes
^1 For Episode 10, each of the Final Four Players was paired with a Guest Player, who would help them in the episode's challenges. For the main match, should a helper be a winner, the token of immunity would transfer to the Guest's player. Kim Kyung-Heon was Kim Kyung-Ran's helper and awarded her Immunity.
^2 All other players were Immune, so these player were Nominated for the Death Match by Default.

=== Elimination Chart ===
Ranking	Contestants	Rounds												MM WIN	DM IMM	DM WIN
Ranking	Contestants	1	2	3	4	5	6	7	8	9	10	11	12	MM WIN	DM IMM	DM WIN
1	Hong Jin-Ho	WIN	IN	IN	WIN	IN	DM	WIN	IMM	DM	DM	WIN	Winner (2:0)	4	1	3
2	Kim Kyung-Ran	IN	IN	WIN	WIN	WIN	IN	IN	IN	IN	IMM	DM	Runner-Up (0:2)	3	1	1
3	Lee Sang-Min	IN	IN	IN	WIN	IMM	IN	IN	IN	IMM	WIN	ELIM	Kim Kyung-Ran	2	2	0
4	Kim Sung-Kyu	WIN	IN	DM	IN	IN	WIN	IMM	WIN	WIN	ELIM		Kim Kyung-Ran	4	1	1
5	Park Eun-Ji	IN	IMM	IN	IN	IN	WIN	DM	DM	ELIM			Kim Kyung-Ran	1	1	2
6	Cha Yu-Ram	IN	DM	IN	WIN	DM	WIN	IN	ELIM				Kim Kyung-Ran	2	0	2
7	Kim Poong	IN	IN	IN	WIN	IN	IN	ELIM					Hong Jin-Ho	1	0	0
8	Kim Gu-Ra	IN	IN	IN	IN	IN	ELIM						Kim Kyung-Ran	0	0	0
9	Choi Jung-Moon	IN	IN	IN	DM	ELIM							Hong Jin-Ho	0	0	1
10	Choi Chang-Yeop	IN	WIN	IMM	ELIM								Hong Jin-Ho	1	1	0
11	Cha Min-Soo	IN	IN	ELIM									Kim Kyung-Ran	0	0	0
12	Kim Min-Seo	DM	ELIM										Hong Jin-Ho	0	0	1
13	Lee Jun-seok	ELIM											Hong Jin-Ho	0	0	0
Garnets		15	35	33	45	56	68	53	54	57	52	59	79 (₩79,000,000)			

The contestant won the main match.

The contestant was selected by the winner of the main match for immunity.

The contestant won the death match.

The contestant lost the death match and was eliminated.

The finalist which the returning eliminated players chose to give the items.

== Main Matches ==
=== Episode 1: 1-2-3 Game (13 Contestants) ===
All 13 contestants begin the game with a total of nine cards, three each with values of 1, 2, and 3. Contestants use these cards to challenge other players to single-card duels; the player who shows highest valued card scores a point, at which point the used cards are removed from the game. Contestants have the right to accept or refuse a challenge from any other contestant, and cards can be traded or given away among fellow contestants. The contestant who scores the most points with their cards wins the Main Match, gains 1 garnet, and is given two Tokens of Life. The contestant who scores the fewest points becomes a candidate for the Death Match. The game lasts a total of 90 minutes; contestants must use all nine of their cards during this time or else their score is automatically reduced to zero. Because there are an odd number of cards in play (9 per contestant x 13 contestants = 117 cards) and cards cannot be destroyed, one contestant is bound to finish the game with at least one card left, thus ending with zero points.

=== Episode 2: Election Game (12 Contestants) ===
Contestants have five minutes to declare candidacy in an election held at the end of the game. Those who declare themselves as candidates are given 20 chips to use as campaign favors for those who are not running and thus make up the voting pool. Every 30 minutes, an "opinion poll" is held to show the candidates how they are faring. At any point, a candidate may decide to drop out of the race, forfeiting their ability to win but also protecting them from losing. After 90 minutes of campaigning, the final vote is held. Whichever candidate wins the vote receives two Tokens of Life, and all campaign chips from that candidate are converted into garnets. The candidate who gets the fewest votes is the Death Match candidate.

=== Episode 3: Abundance and Famine (11 Contestants) ===
This game is played over the course of five rounds. In each round, players must decide whether to travel to the land of Abundance (where 6 pieces of bread are produced each round) or the land of Famine (where 3 pieces are produced each round). At the end of each round, the bread is evenly split among all those who traveled to that particular place, and any remaining bread is discarded. For example, if 6 people travel to Abundance, they each get 1 bread; if 7 people travel there, nobody gets any bread because there is not enough to go around. Players make their decision to travel to either land by purchasing a train ticket in secret, and are given five ticket coupons at the start of the game for these transactions. Contestants are told how many people went to each town at the end of the round, but not who specifically went there. At the end of the game, everyone earns 1 garnet for every 3 pieces of bread they earned. The contestant with the most bread wins two Tokens of Life; the contestant with the least becomes a Death Match candidate. In the event of a tie for last place, the winner decides the Death Match candidate.

=== Episode 4: Zombie Game (10 Contestants) ===
Two contestants are randomly selected as zombies to begin the game. The zombies know their own status, but not the status of the other players (including the other zombie).

The game is played over three 30-minute rounds. In each round, players must "touch" each other by placing their hand on a light together. If two humans touch, they each score a point. If a zombie touches a human, the human becomes a zombie. (Nothing happens if two zombies touch). Two players cannot touch each other more than once each round, and a player must touch someone else during the round or else they automatically become a zombie at the end of the round. Once each round is over, the number of humans and zombies is shown to the players. Each player is also given an antidote at the start of the game; if taken within 10 minutes of being touched by a zombie, the human is cured. (Antidotes have no effect on the two original zombies.) Antidotes can also be purchased for five garnets. The zombies win the game, a Token of Life, and three garnets each, if they manage to turn everyone else into zombies, and select the Death Match candidate. If any humans survive the game, the one with the most points wins and earns one garnet for each point scored; and the one with the fewest points loses and becomes the Death Match candidate. If all surviving humans have the same number of points, they are declared joint winners and select a Death Match candidate among the zombies.

=== Episode 5: Scamming Horse Race (9 Contestants) ===
The nine remaining contestants must earn as many chips as possible by predicting the predetermined outcome of a race between 8 horses.

At the start of the game, each player receives a different clue as to the outcome of the race. Three more hints are available to read for three garnets each. Players are also given 20 chips with which to bet during the race.

The race is held over the course of 12 rounds. In each round, each horse will move from 0 to 3 spaces forward on a 20-space track. After the round, players may place bets on any horse that has not gotten within three spaces of the finish line. Betting is also limited to 3 chips per round, either split up among multiple horses or all bet on a single horse. Betting also determines the odds of a winning horse, as the more chips placed on a horse the lower the payout odds will be. The first and second horses to finish pay out for those who bet on them, and any chips that were not wagered are lost. At the end of the race, the player who scored the highest payout wins two Tokens of Life, and the player with the lowest payout is the Death Match candidate. Contestants also earn one garnet for every 10 chips won.

=== Episode 6: Catch the Burglar (8 Contestants) ===
The eight contestants are divided into two villages: one of 5 people and one of 3 people. One contestant is randomly chosen at the beginning to be the burglar; the other players start the game with 10 gold.

In each round, both villages will select one player to exile from their village. If the burglar is exiled, no gold is stolen; if the burglar remains in town, he steals one gold from all other villagers there. Those who were exiled then travel to the other village to start the next round. A total of 10 rounds are played this way, with the amount of gold held by each player revealed after every other round (but without identifying what letter is associated with each player). After 10 rounds, the town without the burglar wins; each villager receives two garnets, and the villager with the most gold in the winning village earns two Tokens of Life. The town that has the burglar loses, and the villager with the least amount of gold left is the Death Match candidate. Additionally, if the burglar has more gold than any other villager, he wins as well; otherwise, he automatically becomes the second Death Match candidate.

=== Episode 7: Open, Pass (7 Contestants) ===
Each contestant begins the game with a pack of 20 cards - 10 of which have the numbers 0-9, 10 of which have the four basic mathematic operations (+, -, ×, ÷). Additional packs of cards can be bought for 1, 2, or 3 garnets, with the effectiveness of each pack based on their price. Players must construct a deck of 20 cards using those they began with and those they purchased. Upon their turn, the cards are given to the dealer, who shuffles them up to three times at the player's request, spreading out the cards after each shuffle so the player can see the order of the cards. (The purchased cards have a differently-colored back, indicating where they are in the deck.)

The dealer then starts with the top card in the player's deck and asks the player whether to "open" the card and turn it over, adding to their sequence; or "pass" the card, discarding it and continuing with the next card in the deck. The objective is to produce the largest total from 10 cards. If multiple numbers or operators are placed side by side, only the leftmost number or operator is counted and the others are discarded. Additionally, if the sequence begins with an operator, a 0 card is placed at the start of the operator, and if the sequence ends with an operator, that operator is discarded.

The player who makes the highest total from their cards wins two Tokens of Life and five garnets; the second-highest total earns two garnets. The player with the lowest total is the Death Match candidate.

=== Episode 8: Kong's Dilemma (6 Contestants) ===
Each contestant begins the match with 10 beans (or kongs), and are split up into two teams of 3.

In each round, players secretly deposit as many kongs as they wish into a jar. At the end of the round, the team that deposits the most kongs wins the round, and the number of kongs deposited by the losing team is revealed. The first team to win three rounds wins the match, and each player from the winning team earns one garnet for every kong they have left over, and the player from the winning team with the most kongs left wins two Tokens of Life. The player from the losing team with the fewest kongs remaining is the Death Match candidate. Thus, the dilemma is finding a way to deposit as many kongs as possible to win the match, but not so many to become vulnerable if your team loses.

=== Episode 9: Expression Auction (5 Contestants) ===
Each contestant begins with 10 bidding cubes, numbered 1 through 10.

A series of auctions are held, with number and operator tiles being put up for bids. Players have 5 seconds to place a bid using one of their numbered cubes; once a bid is placed, the other players have 5 seconds to match or increase the bid, otherwise the highest bidder wins the tile(s). If nobody places a bid on a tile, or two players bid the same number on a tile, the tile is discarded. Any cubes used in an auction are also discarded, whether or not the bid was successful. The order in which the tiles are auctioned off is known to the players ahead of time.

Players must use all of the tiles obtained through auction to complete a mathematic equation that equals 10. Number tiles cannot be combined to make two-digit numbers. The first player to complete an equation that equals 10 wins the match, two Tokens, and 10 garnets. Any player who does not have a valid equation once the game is over is automatically declared a loser, and the winner chooses a Death Match candidate from these players. If nobody can complete an equation equalling 10 by game's end, the player who is closest wins and receives a garnet amount equal to the total of their expression, up to 20. If multiple players reach 10 together, they are declared joint winners.

=== Episode 10: Confined Scamming Horse Race (4 Contestants) ===
This game is played in similar fashion to episode 5's Scamming Horse Race. Each of the remaining contestants invites a friend to the studio to serve as a teammate. Teams are assigned a specific room in the studio, and while the guests are free to enter anyone elses room, the original players are not allowed to leave their respective rooms.

Like the original Scamming Horse Race, teams are given a clue to the predetermined outcome of a horse race. Additional clues are given after every three rounds, and there are clues for sale, with the first clue purchased costing 3 garnets and each subsequent clue costing one more garnet than the last.

Once again, bets can only be placed until a horse is within three spaces of finishing, and a horse's odds go down the more bets that are placed on it. Each player and guest receives 20 betting chips, but since the players cannot leave their rooms, the guests must bet for both themselves and their teammate.

At the end of the race, the two people with the highest winnings are given a Token of Life (with a guest automatically transferring their Token to the player if they win). The two players without a token automatically play in the Death Match. Players also receive a garnet for every 10 chips won in the race between themselves and their guest.

=== Episode 11: 5:5 Game (3 Contestants) ===
Ten guests are invited to the studio, and the three contestants are given one hour to converse with the guests and gather information about them. The guests, however, have been instructed to resist the interrogations of the contestants - if three or more people are in the room, the questions are too invasive, or the contestants make a direct request of the guest, they are supposed to withhold their answers.

Once the hour is over, the game is played in two rounds. In each round, each contestant asks the assembled guests three Yes/No questions. The main premise of a question cannot be repeated, nor can the question be longer than 12 letters. Guests must answer truthfully. Contestants are shown neither the questions asked by the other contestants, nor the answers given.

Contestants score a point every time five guests answer Yes and five answer No. The player who scores the most points wins the match and earns one garnet for each point scored. The other two players automatically play in the Death Match.

=== Episode 12: The Final (2 Contestants) ===
The final match consists of three 1 vs. 1 games. Two of these games are previous Death Matches - Indian Poker and Same Picture Hunt. The third game, Gyul! Hap!, is introduced for the first time.

Prior to the final match, the 11 eliminated contestants return to the studio. Each one randomly draws an advantage from 12 available, and picks which of the finalists to grant the advantage to. The last remaining advantage is given to the finalist who begins the match with the most garnets. Each game has three advantages innate to them, and three more advantages affect the overall composition of the match - one that allows the player to determine what order the older games were played (with Gyul! Hap! being played second no matter what), a second that copies another advantage used by the player, and a third that cancels any advantage played by their opponent.

The first player to win two games is crowned the champion, and wins the combined total of both players' garnets, plus a 20 garnet bonus. The garnets are then converted into money at a rate of ₩1,000,000 per garnet.

== Death Matches ==
=== Episodes 1, 2, 5: Winning Streak ===
The two candidates face off against the safe players in individual games of Rock–paper–scissors. The objective is to create the longest winning streak across all the matches played. The candidate that amasses the longest winning streak survives; the losing candidate is eliminated. Prior to the match, candidates may indicate to the safe players which symbol they will throw, thus giving the safe players control over how their individual match will turn out and in turn controlling who wins the Death Match.

This Death Match was played three times, each with a different procedure:

Episode 1: Safe players randomly drew the order in which they faced the two candidates.

Episode 2: Safe players were allowed to decide as a group what order they wished to face the two candidates, but were required to use the same order for both.

Episode 5: The four players who had been previously eliminated returned to take part in the Death Match, and the order was predetermined.

=== Episodes 3, 4, 10: Tactical Yutnori ===
The two Death Match candidates faced off in a game of Yutnori with a teammate of their choice. In this version of the game, each player received one marked yut stick and one blank yut stick, and deliberated with their teammate which combination to throw in the center based on game circumstance and the tendencies of their opponents. All four players had two mal tokens placed on the game board; however only the candidate's mals are required to complete the course in order to finish. The first candidate to get both of their mals back to the finish survived; the loser was eliminated. Those who were selected as teammates for the candidates wagered one garnet against each other as to the outcome. In Episode 10, this Deathmatch was played with the candidates' invited guests for the Main Match.

=== Episodes 6, 7, 9: Indian Poker ===
Each candidate bought into the game with 5 chips for each garnet they began the match with (other players were allowed to give garnets to the candidates in order to help them). A pack of 20 cards, containing the numbers 1-10 twice, was shuffled. The game continued with the same deck until all cards were exhausted, at which point a new pack was opened.

To start the hand, both players paid an ante of one chip into the pot. A card was then dealt to each player, who held the card against their forehead so that they could each see their opponent's card but not their own. Betting went back and forth between the players, with the option to either call, raise, or fold. If the bet was called, both players would show their cards and the higher card would win the pot - in the event of a tie, the pot carried over to the next hand. If a bet was folded, the pot was automatically won by the betting player - and if the folding player folded a 10, that player was forced to pay a 10-chip penalty to the winner.

The game continued until one candidate ran out of chips; that candidate was eliminated.

In the final match, the advantages were +5 Chips (used twice) and +2 to Card. The former advantage gave an additional 5 chips to the player who had it at the start of the game (the opening stake was 20 chips), and the latter advantage allowed its used to add 2 to the value of any card played in a showdown.

=== Episode 8: Image Game ===
The two Death Match candidates and four other players played a game similar to the card game Dixit. All six players were dealt six cards with pictures on their fronts. The two candidates would take turns playing the role of Tester. In each round, the Tester would play a card face down and give a brief but misleading description of the card. The other five players would then play a card of their own that followed the same description. The six cards were then shuffled and revealed face up, and all but the Tester would guess which of the cards belonged to the Tester. If the Tester's opponent chooses the right card, the Tester loses 1 garnet; if the Tester's opponent guesses wrong, that candidate loses a garnet. However, if all five players guess correctly or they all guess wrong, the Tester loses 2 garnets. The first candidate to lose all their garnets is eliminated.

=== Episode 11: Same Picture Hunt ===
A series of 16 picture tiles are shuffled and hidden behind 16 letter panels. Tiles representing the pictures are then dealt out on a conveyor belt with 20 spaces on it. The candidate with the most garnets starts the game 8 spaces back on the conveyor belt, while the candidate with fewer garnets starts 10 spaces back. Starting with the candidate with more garnets, each candidate tries to locate the picture on the board that matches the next tile on their belt. If correct, they advance forward one space to the next tile and are allowed to continue. If incorrect, the belt is sent one space backward, and the candidate must still look for the same tile on their next turn. The game continues until either one candidate successfully reaches the front of their conveyor belt, at which point they win; or until one candidate makes enough mistakes to fall off their belt, at which point they are eliminated.

The effects of the three advantages for the final match version of Same Picture Hunt are unknown, since the final match ended before this game was played.

=== Episode 12 (Final): Gyul! Hap! ===
This game was played over the course of 10 rounds. In each round, the players are shown a series of 9 cards. Each card has three features: shape (circle, square, triangle), shape color (red, yellow, blue), and background color (black, white, gray).

Starting with a game of Rock-Paper-Scissors to determining who plays first, players take turns identifying sets of three cards in which the three features are either all the same or all different. (For example: Circle-Red-Black, Square-Red-White, Triangle-Red-Gray.) If they see a set, the player says "Hap!", and identifies the three cards. If the set is valid, the player scores a point. If the set is invalid, or has already been called, the player loses a point. If 10 seconds pass without a "Hap!" call, play passes to the other player.

If all of the sets have been identified, the player may call "Gyul!" If "Gyul!" was called correctly and there are no more sets left, the player scores 3 points and the round ends. If "Gyul!" is called when there are still sets to identify, however, the player loses 1 point.

The player with the most points after 10 rounds wins the game. If the score is tied after 10 rounds, an 11th round is played as a tiebreaker.

There were two advantages available for the final match: Hap and Double (used twice). The Hap advantage gave the user the ability to know how many sets there were in the round. The Double advantaged doubled the point values for the round.
