= Jung Jong-yeon =

South Korean television producer and director

- Born: October 6, 1976 (age 49); South Korea
- Occupations: Television producer, director
- Employer(s): CJ E&M (2011–2022); TEO (2022-present)

Korean name
- Hangul: 정종연
- RR: Jeong Jongyeon
- MR: Chŏng Chongyŏn

Jung Jong-yeon (Korean: 정종연; born October 6, 1976) is a South Korean television producer and director. Jeong is best known for producing and directing the popular reality shows The Genius, Society Game and The Great Escape. He also directed on Korea's Got Talent.

He worked at CJ E&M (parent company of tvN, TVING) from 2011 to 2022, and in 2022 he left CJ E&M and moved to TEO, founded by fellow director Kim Tae-Ho.

== Filmography ==
Ref:

=== As producer-director ===
Year	Title	Network
2011 – 2012	Korea's Got Talent	tvN
2013 – 2015	The Genius	tvN
2016 – 2017	The Society Game	tvN
2018 — present	Great Escape	tvN
2019	Trans-Siberian Pathfinders	tvN
2020	Decoding Meow	tvN
2021 — present	Girls' High Mystery Class	TVING
2023 — present	The Devil's Plan	Netflix
2024 — present	Agents of Mystery	Netflix

== Criticism/controversy ==
=== Plagiarism Issue ===
Jung Jong-yeon was criticized for plagiarism in Korea. In particular, his first hit, The Genius, had many similarities with the Japanese series Liar Game, and faced a lot of criticism for rip-off the Liar Game's own game and claiming that it was a game they made themselves.

Also he also apologized after it has been revealed that the ciphertext appeared in the Great Escape has copied the Linto's language from Japanese TV series Kamen Rider Kuuga.

=== Animal abuse ===
Jung Jong-yeon's TV show "Decoding Meow"(Korean: 냐옹은 페이크다; lit. 'The Cat is a Fake') has been controversial for Adoption fraud, Speciesism and Breed Discrimination, animal abuse. As a result, Decoding Meow has broadcast only 6 episode and ended earlier.

=== Alleged relation with the Nth room case ===
During early 2020, the Nth room case garnered national attention in South Korea. In April 2020 it was alleged by internet users that Jung Jong-yeon was one of the participants in the Nth Room.
