= The Genius: Rule Breaker =

- Promotional poster
- Winner: Lee Sang-min
- No. of episodes: 12

Release
- Original network: tvN
- Original release: December 7, 2013 – February 22, 2014

Season chronology
- ← Previous; The Genius: Rules of the Game Next → The Genius: Black Garnet

The Genius: Rule Breaker (Korean: 더 지니어스:룰 브레이커) is the second season of The Genius, which debuted on tvN on December 7, 2013.

== Cast ==
(in alphabetical order)

- Eun Ji-won
- Hong Jin-ho
- Jo Yoo-young
- Kim Jae-kyung
- Lee Da-hye
- Lee Doo-hee
- Lee Eun-gyeol
- Lee Sang-min
- Lim Yo-hwan
- Lim Yoon-sun
- Nam Hwee-jong
- Noh Hong-chul
- Yoo Jung-hyun

== Format changes ==
=== Token of Immortality ===
This season introduced a new element to the gameplay, the Token of Immortality. Until found, the winner of each round was given a hint to the location and how to obtain this token, which could be used to exempt oneself from a Deathmatch.

In episode 6, Lee Sang-min found the token, using the clue he obtained as the winner of episode 5, and clues disclosed by Lim Yo-hwan. The token was accompanied by a fake token, which was used in episode 6 by Lee Doo-hee. Lee Sang-min gave up his token to Lim Yo-hwan, in episode 10.

== Episodes ==
Episode	Main Match	Main Match winner	Immunity receiver	Main Match loser	Appointed opponent	Death Match	Eliminated
1	Food Chain	Hong Jin-ho; Lee Sang-min; Yoo Jung-hyun; Eun Ji-won; Lee Da-hye	-	Nam Hwee-jong	Lim Yoon-sun	Quattro	Nam Hwee-jong
2	Seat Exchange	Hong Jin-ho	Yoo Jung-hyun; Jo Yoo-young; Lee Eun-gyeol; Lee Da-hye	Noh Hong-chul	Kim Jae-kyung	Sun, Moon, Star	Kim Jae-kyung
3	King Game	Hong Jin-ho; Lee Sang-min; Lee Doo-hee	Yoo Jung-hyun; Eun Ji-won; Noh Hong-chul; Lim Yo-hwan; Lim Yoon-sun; Lee Eun-gyeol	Jo Yoo-young; Lee Da-hye	-	Gyul! Hap!	Lee Da-hye
4	Blackout Game	Hong Jin-ho; Yoo Jung-hyun; Jo Yoo-young; Noh Hong-chul; Lee Doo-hee	-	Eun Ji-won	Lee Eun-gyeol	Sun, Moon, Star	Lee Eun-gyeol
5	7 Commandments	Lee Sang-min	Jo Yoo-young	Lim Yoon-sun	Lim Yo-hwan	Laser Chess	Lim Yoon-sun
6	Monopoly Game	Lee Sang-min	Eun Ji-won	Lee Doo-hee	Jo Yoo-young	Blackout Game	Lee Doo-hee
7	God's Judgment	Lee Sang-min	Yoo Jung-hyun	Eun Ji-won	Hong Jin-ho	Indian Hold'em	Hong Jin-ho
8	Minus Auction	Lee Sang-min; Jo Yoo-young	-	Yoo Jung-hyun	Noh Hong-chul	Same Picture Hunt	Noh Hong-chul
9	Layoff	Lee Sang-min; Eun Ji-Won	-	Jo Yoo-young	Yoo Jung-hyun	Black and White	Jo Yoo-young
10	Big Deal Game	Lee Sang-min	Lim Yo-hwan	Yoo Jung-hyun; Eun Ji-won	-	Indian Hold'em	Eun Ji-won
11	Elevator Game	Hong Jin-ho; Lee Doo-hee; Lee Da-hye ^{1}	Lee Sang-min	Lim Yo-hwan; Yoo Jung-hyun	-	Black and White	Yoo Jung-hyun
12	Indian Hold'em	Lim Yo-hwan		Lee Sang-min			
12	Truth Detector	Lee Sang-min		Lim Yo-hwan			
12	Quattro	Lee Sang-min		Lim Yo-hwan			
12	Finals	Lee Sang-min : Lim Yo-hwan (2:1)					

Footnotes
^1 The winners are guest players.

=== Elimination chart ===
Ranking	Contestants	Rounds												MM WIN	DM IMM	DM WIN
Ranking	Contestants	1	2	3	4	5	6	7	8	9	10	11^{1}	12	MM WIN	DM IMM	DM WIN
1	Lee Sang-min	WIN	IN	WIN	IN	WIN	WIN	WIN	WIN	WIN	WIN	IMM	Winner(2:1)	8	1	0
2	Lim Yo-hwan	IN	IN	IMM	IN	DM	IN	IN	IN	IN	IMM	DM	Runner-Up(1:2)	0	2	2
3	Yoo Jung-hyun	WIN	IMM	IMM	WIN	IN	IN	IMM	DM	DM	DM	ELIM	Lee Sang-min	2	3	3
4	Eun Ji-won	WIN	IN	IMM	DM	IN	IMM	DM	IN	WIN	ELIM		Lee Sang-min	2	2	2
5	Jo Yoo-young	IN	IMM	DM	WIN	IMM	DM	IN	WIN	ELIM			Lee Sang-min	2	2	2
6	Noh Hong-chul	IN	DM	IMM	WIN	IN	IN	IN	ELIM				Im Yo-hwan	1	1	1
7	Hong Jin-ho	WIN	WIN	WIN	WIN	IN	IN	ELIM				WIN	Lee Sang-min	4	0	0
8	Lee Doo-hee	IN	IN	WIN	WIN	IN	ELIM					WIN	Lee Sang-min	2	0	0
9	Im Yoon-sun	DM	IN	IMM	IN	ELIM							Im Yo-hwan	0	1	1
10	Lee Eun-gyeol	IN	IMM	IMM	ELIM								Lee Sang-min	0	2	0
11	Lee Da-hye	WIN	IMM	ELIM								WIN	Im Yo-hwan	1	1	0
12	Kim Jae-kyung	IN	ELIM										Im Yo-hwan	0	0	0
13	Nam Hwee-jong	ELIM											Im Yo-hwan	0	0	0
Garnets		18	49	44	63	70	80	45	55	57	62	62	62 (₩62,000,000)			

Footnotes
^1 The winners of Round 11 were the guest players: Hong Jin-ho, Lee Doo-hee and Lee Da-hye. They received 20,000,000 Won (approximately $20,000 USD) which was shared evenly among the 10 eliminated players with each receiving 2,000,000 Won (approximately $2,000 USD). As a result, none of the Genius players won. By default, the first-place winner amongst the contestants was Lee Sang-min, who received immunity for the round.

== Main matches ==
=== Episode 1: Food Chain (13 Contestants) ===
All 13 contestants were secretly assigned an animal identity at the start of the game. Four animals are predators (Lion, Alligator, Eagle, Hyena) while the others are all prey (Otter, Chameleon, Mouse, Snake, Deer, Duck, Rabbit, Crow, Plover). Before the game, each player also gets to peek at the identity of one other player.

The game is played in four rounds. In each round, the animals all move to one of four "habitats" - Forest, Field, River, and Sky - based on the rooms of the studio. Predators attack other animals in the same habitat by putting a sticker on their prey; if a higher-ranked predator attacks a lower-ranked animal, the animal is eaten and removed from the game. Also, each of the predators are only allowed to starve for a certain number of rounds, and die if they do not attack enough prey. After each round, all surviving animals are given the choice to move to a different habitat, but all animals have a "home" habitat that they must return to the following round.

Each animal has unique abilities and win conditions. The Lion wins if it survives the game, and can attack any other animal (except the Snake), but must eat in every round or else it starves to death. The Alligator ranks just below the Lion, and can starve for one round, but must also survive to win. The Eagle is next, and is the only predator that can live in the Sky, but it must also survive without going hungry more than once. The Hyena is the lowest-ranked predator, and can starve twice before dying, but its only condition for winning is that the Lion dies. The Snake is considered prey, but any animal that tries to attack it dies; it wins if at least nine other animals die over the course of the game. The Chameleon is able to mask itself as any other animal in the peeking phase. The Plover, AKA the Alligator Bird, wins if the Alligator survives. Similarly, the Mouse wins if the Lion survives. The Crow only has to correctly predict another animal that will win in order to win themselves. Finally, the Deer, Rabbit, Duck, and Otter are all immune to attack if all surviving members of this group are in the same habitat in the same round; each of them must survive in order to win.

All winners receive a garnet, a Token of Life, and a clue to the Token of Immortality. The winners decide as a group who will be the Death Match candidate, who in turn chooses their opponent.

=== Episode 2: Seat Exchange (12 Contestants) ===
Twelve chairs are arranged in a circle. The contestants are all secretly assigned either a number from 1-11, or an X. The group is then told how many consecutive numbers are sitting next to each other.

The game is played over a series of 10-minute round. In each round, players switch seats with each other with mutual consent. The objective is to have exactly five players with consecutive numbers seated next to each other. The sequence can include the players on both ends of the number range (e.g. 9-10-11-1-2), but cannot involve the X in any way, nor can it have more than five players. At the end of the round, the group is told the longest chain of consecutive numbers. The next round then begins, with each player's number increasing by 1. The player who was 11 in the previous round becomes X, and the X from the previous round starts over at 1.

Once a sequence of five consecutive numbers is achieved, the game ends. All five players who comprise the sequence receive a Token of Life. The player seated in the center of the sequence also earns five garnets and a clue about the Token of Immortality. Whoever is X at the end of the game becomes the Death Match candidate.

=== Episode 3: King Game (11 Contestants) ===
A King is elected by the contestants to start the game. After each round, the outgoing King chooses the next person to assume the throne, but each player must be chosen as King once.

In the first round, players place their hand in a box and secretly choose to reveal either a thumb or an index finger. The King assigns each player (including themselves at the end) to one of two areas in the center hall. Each area must have at least two people in it. Once everyone has been moved, the number of thumbs and index fingers in each area is revealed, and those with the minority selection in each area score a point. No points are scored if there is an even split in an area, or if everyone in one area chose the same position. Players select a new hand position in every odd-numbered round.

After 11 rounds, the player with the most points wins the game and gets a clue about the Token of Immortality. The players with the lowest score automatically go to the Death Match; if one player has sole possession of the lowest score, the next lowest scores also become Death Match candidates. All players not involved with the Death Match also earn one garnet.

=== Episode 4: Blackout Game (10 Contestants) ===
The 10 contestants are divided into two teams of 5.

Each team is given five opportunities to cross a red line in the center of the hall while the room is dark (even the contestants' name tags are turned off to prevent them from being seen). One member of the opposing team sits in a chair facing the center hall, and must decide whether or not anyone tried to cross the line while the room was dark. In each round, the room is dark for 60 seconds, at which point the opposing player must press either the red button (if they believe players crossed the line) or the green button (if they believe that nobody crossed). If the green button is pressed, any player that successfully crossed scores one point for each successful crossing they've had. (e.g. The second time a player successfully crosses, they score 2 points.) If the red button is pressed, any player that crossed is eliminated from the game; however, if the red button is pressed and nobody crossed, the attacking team gets to send one player across as a penalty. The red button can only be pressed four times over the course of five rounds. The team that scores the most points are all safe, and they each earn a garnet and a clue about the Token of Immortality. The winning team also chooses the first candidate of the Death Match from the losers.

=== Episode 5: 7 Commandments (9 Contestants) ===
At the start of the game, each player draws four tokens at random. These tokens come in one of four colors (red, yellow, blue, green), are worth 1 point each, and are known to all other players. Each player also receives a Personal Bill that gives them a unique rule for them to follow.

For two hours, the players attempt to pass Global Bills that affect either the number, the color configuration, or the value of their tokens. Bills are then put to a vote, with a majority required to pass a Global Bill. However, players also have two other options: Sign or Veto. If a bill is Signed, it automatically passes regardless of opposition; if it is Vetoed, it fails regardless of support. If both a Sign and a Veto is played on a bill, the side with more Sign or Veto votes prevails; if this number is equal, the normal votes to support or oppose determine the bill's fate. A Wild Card must be played to either Sign or Veto a bill; one Wild Card is given to each player at the outset, and if a player tries to Sign or Veto a bill without a Wild Card, they must forfeit all of their chips. Only seven bills may be in play at a time; any bills after the seventh that pass remove the oldest bill from the game.

After the two hour period has ended, each player gets one last opportunity to pass a Global Bill. Once that has ended, players score based on the number and value of chips they have. The highest scoring player earns seven garnets, two Tokens of Life, and a clue for the Token of Immortality. If there are joint winners, they each earn a Token of Life and a clue but no garnets. The lowest scoring player becomes the Death Match candidate.

=== Episode 6: Monopoly Game (8 Contestants) ===
A deck of 64 cards is shuffled, and each player receives a hand of 8 cards. There are eight different resources represented in the deck: Coal, Steel, and Wood each have 8 cards in the deck; Water, Oil, Corn, Gold, and Diamonds each have 7 cards. There are also five Bomb cards in the deck. Each player's cards are stored in a safe, and each player is given an ID card. To trade cards with another player, they must show their ID to the dealer to access their cards. Trades must be made for equal numbers of cards. Bomb cards can be defused, but at a cost of 10 garnets per bomb.

Once a player has monopolized all of the cards of a given resource, they must press the Monopolize button in the hall. This ends the game, and the player who created the monopoly wins. If the game ends this way, the winner receives five garnets, two Tokens of Life, and a clue for the Token of Immortality, and the player with the most Bomb cards in their hand is the Death Match candidate. (If there is a tie for most bombs, the winner chooses the candidate.) However, the game can also be won by monopolizing the Bomb cards. If this happens, the winner receives 10 garnets, two Tokens of Life, and a clue for the Token of Immortality, and the player with the most different resource types in their hand is the candidate.

This episode generated significant controversy.

=== Episode 7: God's Judgment (7 Contestants) ===
All 7 players are given a pair of dice. One die in each pair has the standard number of pips, from 1 to 6; the other die either has all odd numbers from 1 through 11, or all even numbers from 2 through 12.

They must find a way to accurately predict the outcome of 10 rolls of their dice, being able to predict two numbers from a range from 1 to 24, scoring a point for each correct prediction. Players can also buy additional dice for a deposit of 5 garnets; these garnets are returned if the player wins. The dice on sale can either have 3, 4, and 5 pips on two sides each; or 4, 5, and 6 pips on two sides each. Dice can be given away or traded among players, and players are allowed to practice rolling, but once they are played officially they are removed from the game. The player who scores the most points earns 10 garnets, two Tokens of Life, and a clue for the Token of Immortality. If there is a tie for highest score, they each get a Token of Life and a clue but no garnets. The lowest score is the first Death Match candidate.

The secret to the game is that all of the dice separate in half and can be combined with the halves of other dice. This, combined with the non-standard arrangement of the pips on the dice, make it possible to create a pair of dice that will roll the same number every single time.

=== Episode 8: Minus Auction (6 Contestants) ===
A series of negative numbers, from -3 to -35, are put up for auction one at a time. The numbers are selected at random during the auction. Additionally, one number is randomly set aside and not put up for auction. Each player begins the auction with 9 chips.

At the start of each auction, a number cube is selected. The first bidder either accepts the cube or passes, but must pay one chip to the pot if they pass. Bidding then continues to the next player in line. Once a cube is accepted, all chips that were paid over the course of the auction are also given to the player who took the cube. That player also starts the bidding for the next auction. If a player has no chips, they can either pay a garnet to pass the bid (which is also given to whoever takes the cube) or must accept the cube.

Once all of the cubes have been auctioned off, players find the grand total of the cubes they accumulated. If a player acquired one or more consecutive numbers, the lowest negative number (that is, the one closest to zero) is the only one that is counted. One point is also added to the total for every chip the player has at the end of the auction. (e.g.: a -5 cube, a -6 cube, a -10 cube, and three chips would total -12.) The player with the lowest negative total (closest to zero) wins five garnets, two Tokens, and a clue for the Token of Immortality if it has not been found yet. The player with the highest negative total (furthest from zero) is the Death Match candidate.

=== Episode 9: Layoff (5 Contestants) ===
Six previous players of The Genius: Rules of the Game are invited to play as guests.

The game is played similarly to the Episode 1 game, Food Chain. In this version, players adopt the role of 11 office workers, including three executive and eight employees, with three "departments" taking the place of habitats. Once again, four rounds of 10 minutes are played, where executives fire employees by affixing a sticker on them. Executives can only fire one employee per round. After four rounds, everyone is separated into those who met their win conditions and those who did not. Contestants who meet their win conditions get a Token of Life and a garnet; guests who win receive ₩1,000,000. The winners then choose a contestant among those who lost to become the first Death Match candidate. If every contestant wins, the one with the most garnets is safe; if only one contestant loses, no Tokens of Life are awarded.

The roles and win conditions in this game are slightly different from Food Chain. President Kim is the highest ranking executive, but must clear at least ₩220 million worth of salary to win the game but still have at least five employees in his office. He cannot directly fire anyone, but if any player attempts to fire President Kim, they are fired automatically instead. He also has no home department, meaning he can travel freely through the office. Prince Kim is President Kim's son, and knows President Kim's identity. He cannot be fired - any executive who tries to fire him is fired instead. In order for Prince Kim to win, President Kim's must win as well. Director Lee is second in command, and can fire employees directly. In order to win, he must fire ₩120 million worth of salary and avoid being fired himself. Head of Department Park ranks below Lee, and must clear ₩70 million worth of salary and not be fired to win. Deputy Head of Department Shim is the lowest-ranking executive, and only wins if Park is fired.

Members of the HR Department each get to look at the identity of another player at the start of the game. As the niece of DHoD Shim, HR member Shimchung can be fired, but gets reinstated and wins the game if DHoD Shim wins as well. Sales employee Kim Seondal can impersonate another employee, like the Chameleon in Food Chain. Sung Choonhyang is in a relationship with Lee Mongryong, and the two players will be told of each other's identities. The Intern has no movement restrictions, and can look at the identities of two players, even though she isn't in HR.

The game also has a similar rule about certain employees being safe when together; Lee Mongryong, Sung Choonhyang, Kim Seondal, and Hong Gildong are all safe from being fired if surviving members of the group are in the same department.

=== Episode 10: Big Deal Game (4 Contestants) ===
Four guests have been invited to play the game with the remaining contestants: the musical group Super Junior. Each contestant is matched up with one of the guests by random draw, but the guests are not told who they've been matched up with, nor will the contestants know who the other guests are paired up with. Each player will draw two colors randomly out of five available (red, yellow, green, blue, white).

The game is played in three rounds. In each round, each player takes a turn as the Master, who draws the entry requirements for their deal. The requirements can involve three, four, or all five colors. The Master of the deal lays claim to one such color, and anyone who has a different qualifying color can take part in the deal. Each deal is worth 5 points per requirement color in the first two rounds, and 10 points per qualifying color in the third round.

In each deal, the Master decides how many points to distribute to the other players in the deal. If everyone agrees to the deal, the points are given out accordingly. If the players cannot reach an agreement or the Master does not want to make a deal, the Master can cancel the deal, giving him only the base amount of either 5 or 10 points depending on the round.

After three rounds, the teams are revealed to all players. The contestant whose team scores the most points earns 5 garnets and a Token of Life; the contestant whose team scores the lowest becomes the first Death Match candidate. If there is a sole winner, the Super Junior member of the winning team wins ₩5,000,000. If two teams tie for the highest score, the contestants both earn the garnets and the Tokens of Life, but the guests get nothing. If three teams tie, the fourth place contestant chooses his Death Match opponent from the other three. If all four teams tie, the contestant with the most garnets to start the game is declared the sole winner.

=== Episode 11: Elevator Game (3 Contestants) ===
Three players who were eliminated earlier in the season are invited back to play as a team against the three contestants, who play as a team on the game board but are trying to score points individually.

The game is played similar to the board game Snakes and Ladders, using a board with 100 spaces with elevators that either direct the team's token up or down on the board. To move, players secretly vote whether to move the token in control 0 or 1 spaces, and the total number of 1 votes dictates the amount of spaces that the token moves. Teams can discuss amongst themselves how many 1s to vote, but will only be told the total number of moves being made when the move is revealed.

Each of the contestants is given 10 markers with which to score points, eight of which are worth 1 point and two worth 2 points. Whenever a token from either team lands on a marker, the player who owns that marker scores. Markers cannot be placed on an elevator, but can be placed on the endpoint of an elevator move.

The game continues until one team either reaches or passes the 100th space on the board. If the contestants finish first, the contestant who scored the most points earns 20 garnets and a Token of Life, sending the other two contestants to the Death Match. If the former contestants finish first, a purse of ₩20,000,000 is divided among all 10 eliminated contestants, but the contestant with the highest score still advances to the final while the other two play in the Death Match. If there is a tie for score, the contestant with the most garnets is safe.

=== Episode 12: The Final (2 Contestants) ===
As in the first season, the final match consists of three games, two of which have been played in previous Death Matches. Before the match starts, the 11 eliminated contestants are invited to return, and each of them selects a secret advantage to give to one of the finalists. A 12th advantage is given to the finalist with the most garnets. Three advantages exist for each game, and the Order Select, Copy, and Cancel advantages return from the first season. The first finalist to win two games is declared the champion.

== Death Matches/Final Matches ==
=== Episodes 1, 12: Quattro ===
Death Match: The game is played using a deck with the numbers 1-10 in four colors (red, yellow, green, blue) plus a black Zero card. The two candidates are each dealt four cards; the other 11 contestants are each dealt three.

Candidates begin by flipping one of their cards face up on the table. Over the course of the game, all four cards must be turned face up, with the candidate deciding when to turn over each card. Along the way, they must trade a card with players on the outside in the hopes of creating a Quattro - four cards of differing value and color. Both candidates must perform exactly one trade with each onlooker, and cannot trade any cards that have already been turned over.

Once all trades have been completed and all cards turned face up, the candidate who completes the largest total Quattro wins. If there is a tie for the total, the candidate with the highest individual card wins. If one player is unable to complete a Quattro, they lose by default. However, if either player has the Zero card at the end of the game, that player loses even if their opponent does not have a Quattro. If neither player has a Quattro, or both players complete a Quattro with exactly the same combination of numbers, the game is a draw and is replayed.

Final Match: The rules were changed for the final match as follows:

- After being dealt their original four cards, either player can call for a mulligan up to two times to receive a new starting hand. Only the player who calls for the mulligan gets new cards; the other player keeps theirs.
- After the onlookers are dealt their cards, each finalist chooses an onlooker and looks at their hand.
- The onlookers were in the screening room rather than the main hall, which meant that the finalists could not communicate with the onlookers about what cards they needed.
- The finalists can only trade cards with three onlookers.
- The Zero card can now be used to make a legal Quattro.

The three advantages for the game allowed for an extra mulligan, an extra trade (although you still cannot trade with an onlooker more than once), and a forced 0 trade, in which the onlooker with the 0 card was required to trade the card with the finalist who used the advantage.

=== Episodes 2, 4: Sun, Moon, Star ===
Each of the safe players select one of three symbols - Sun, Moon, or Star - and place it inside a cup with their picture on it. Safe players are free to share this information with the candidates.

The two candidates each start the game with four betting chips. Betting starts with the candidate who came into the Death Match with fewer garnets, and they must bet on which symbol was chosen by the first player in order, up to half the amount of chips owned by the other candidate. (e.g.: if the other candidate has 8 chips, you can only bet up to 4.) The other candidate then must bet exactly twice as many chips as the starting player on one of the symbols. The symbol is then revealed, and winning bets are paid at 2:1 odds. This continues until all of the symbols have been played, or one candidate loses all of their chips. If the game reaches the end before either candidate busts out, the one who has the most chips wins.

In Episode 2, onlookers were invited to bet their garnets on who they believed would win the Death Match, thus encouraging them to engineer a desired outcome.

=== Episode 3: Gyul! Hap! ===
This game is played similarly to the version played in the final match of Season 1, but one rule has been added: in the event that the turn passes five times without a Hap! call, the round automatically ends.

=== Episode 5: Laser Chess ===
This game is played on a 8x8 game board, similar to regular chess. However, the pieces are different. The playing pieces consist of the following:

- The King, which the player must defend at all costs. It can move in any direction, but has no defensive capabilities and is captured as soon as a laser strikes it from any side.
- The Laser, which fires a beam at the end of each of the player's turns. It can be rotated, but cannot move or be turned to fire away from the board.
- The Splitter, which splits any laser fired into it into two beams, one going at a 90 degree angle and the other passing straight through. It cannot be attacked.
- The Triangle Knight, which has a diagonally-oriented mirror on it to bend a laser's light 90 degrees. The other two sides of the piece are vulnerable, however, and the piece will be removed if a laser hits it from a non-mirrored side.
- The Square Knight, which is similar to the Triangle Knight but has a mirror on only one side to direct a laser back in the opposite direction. It has three vulnerable sides.

On each turn, the candidates take turns either moving a piece or rotating a piece 90 degrees. After each turn, the offensive player's laser is fired, and any piece that is hit on a non-mirrored side by the laser is captured and removed from play. This continues until one candidate successfully captures their opponent's King and wins the game.

=== Episode 6: Blackout Game ===
The Death Match version of this game is played in the same way as the Main Match, with each candidate serving as the captains of a four-person team. Because there are only 8 contestants instead of 10, the game is played in four rounds, and the red button can only be pressed three times per side. All other rules are the same.

=== Episodes 7, 10, 12: Indian Hold'em ===
This game is played similarly to the Indian Poker game used in Season 1, but with a pack of 40 cards, containing 4 sets of the numbers 1-10. In this version, two community cards are dealt to the center of the table once each player has received their card. Three of a Kind is the strongest hand possible in this version, followed by a straight, then a pair, and finally a high card. If a candidate folds with a straight or better, they must pay a 10-chip penalty to the winner.

The two advantages available in the final match allowed the finalist to start with 5 extra chips along with their original stake of 20 (two such advantages were available), and the ability to switch out the community cards with two new cards before betting begins.

=== Episode 8: Same Picture Hunt ===
This game was played exactly the same as in Season 1.

=== Episodes 9, 11: Black and White ===
Each candidate is given nine tiles: black tiles with even numbers from 0 to 8, and white tiles with odd numbers from 1 to 7.

The candidate with more garnets coming into the Death Match starts the game, and places a tile face down in front of them. Their opponent does the same. Whoever played the highest value tile scores a point, but neither player is told what number their opponent played. The candidate who scored the last point plays first in the next round. When all nine tiles are played, the candidate who scores the most points wins. If there is a tie, the game is ruled a draw and replayed.

=== Episode 12: Truth Detector ===
Both finalists write down a four-digit code number. The object of the game is to guess your opponent's number before they can guess yours.

Each finalist takes turns asking each other questions about their code number, which the other player must answer with a lie. If the question is answered truthfully, an alarm sounds and the answering player must reveal a number not used in their code number as a penalty. Also, answers cannot be irrelevant to the question, impossible (such as stating that there are 5 odd numbers in the code number), or evasive. If a player thinks they have their opponent's code number, they must call "answer" before guessing. If incorrect, the turn passes to the other player.

The three advantages available in this game allowed for a player to have the right to go first, avoid one penalty for telling the truth (although the Truth Detector will still go off), and ask two questions in a single turn.
