= Jang Dong-min =

South Korean comedian

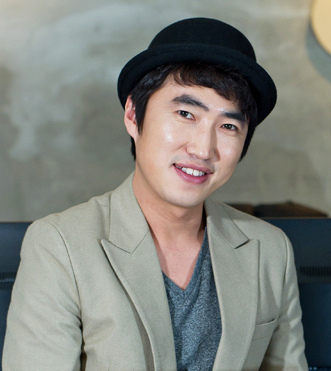
- Jang in 2012
- Born: July 20, 1979 (age 47); Asan, South Korea
- Spouse: Joo Yu-jin (m. 2021)
- Children: 2

Comedy career
- Years active: 2004–present
- Medium: Stand-up comedy, television
- Genres: Observational, Sketch, Wit, Parody, Slapstick, Dramatic, Sitcom

Korean name
- Hangul: 장동민
- Hanja: 張東民
- RR: Jang Dongmin
- MR: Chang Tongmin

Jang Dong-min (Korean: 장동민; Hanja: 張東民; born July 20, 1979), is a South Korean comedian. He is known as "comedian who curses a lot", (his comedy style is mainly based on yelling and cursing). He joined Gag Concert as part of its 19th season (2004), along with Yoo Se-yoon and Yoo Sang-moo. Together they made up a trio called 옹달샘 (Ongdalsaem). He was the winner of the 3rd and 4th seasons of The Genius. He is particularly noted in the industry for his witty, if harsh and pointed, gags. It was reported that these gags got him in a lot of hot water.

== Education ==
Jang graduated from Sorabol High School in 1998, and went on to pursue higher education at Dong-ah Institute of Media and Arts.

== Personal life ==
On December 6, 2021, it was announced that Jang was going to marry a non-celebrity at a wedding ceremony on Jeju Island on December 19, 2021. On January 17, 2022, it was confirmed that Jang's wife was pregnant. On June 17, 2022, his wife gave birth to their first child, a daughter. On June 23, 2023, Jang's wife announced her second pregnancy. Their second child, a son, was born on January 23, 2024.

== Filmography ==
=== Film ===
Year	Show	Role
2008	Cherry Tomato	A porter
2011	Marrying the Mafia IV	Airport security officer

=== Television series ===
Year	Show	Role
2011	Korean Mystery Detective Jung Yak Yong	Jang-I
2014–2015	Sweden Laundry	Kim Kyung-jin (Episodes 14–15)

=== Variety shows ===
Year	Show	Notes
2014	I Am a Man	MC; co-hosts: Yoo Jae-suk, Im Won-hee, Kwon Oh-joong, Heo Kyung-hwan, Kim Je-dong
2014	The Genius: Black Garnet	Winner
2015	Animals	Cast member
2015	Crime Scene 2	Cast member
2015	The Genius: Grand Final	Winner
2015	Infinite Challenge	Sixth Man candidate (419-424)
2015	Dating Alone	Cast member
2017	Society Game: Season 2	Winner
2019	Six-Party Talks	MC
2019	Player 7	Recurring guest
2019	King of Mask Singer	Contestant (Schweitzer)
2021	Steel Troops	Fixed moderator
2021	Drinking Guys	Host / IHQ & Discovery Channel
2021	Cooking - The Birth of a Cooking King	contestant / JTBC
2021	Han Cooker	Host with Yoo Se-yoon / T-Cast E Channel
2021	Bloody Game Season 1	MBC, Wavve / Host
2021–2022	General Meeting of Shareholders	IHQ / Host
2021–2022	Teacher of Narat	Teacher
2022	Steel Troops	Panelist; season 2
2022	Daughter Thieves	Cast
2022	World Dark Tour	Host
2024	Crime Scene Returns	Cast member
2024	Bloody Game Season 3	Winner
2025	Crime Scene Zero	Cast member
2026	Betting on Fact	Winner
2026	The Devil's Plan 3	Cast member

=== Radio programs ===
Year	Show	Notes
October 2010 – May 2011	Far Away and Dreaming Radio	Guest appearance, alongside Yoo Se-yoon and Yoo Sang-moo
March 2013	Far Away and Dreaming Radio (podcast)	Guest appearance, alongside Yoo Se-yoon and Yoo Sang-moo
2014	Jo Jung-chi & Jang Dong-min's 2 o'clock (KBS Cool FM)	Guest, alongside Jo Jung-chi
January 2015 – April 2015	Jang Dong-min & Lady Jane's 2 o'clock	Guest, alongside Lady Jane

=== Music video appearances ===
Year	Title	Artist
2010	"Go Crazy"	Kan Mi-youn
2011	"트랄랄라"	UV (음악 그룹)
2015	"I Wish"	M&D

== Ambassadorship ==
- Public Relations Ambassador of Wonju, Gangwon Province (2023)
