= Oh Hyun-min =

South Korean television personality (born 1995)

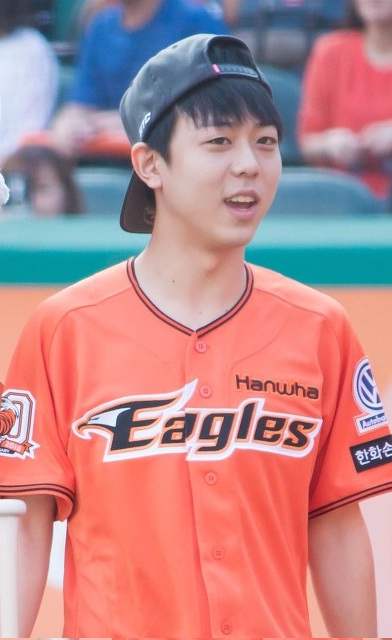
- Oh Hyun-min at the Eagles Baseball Match, 2015
- Born: June 6, 1995 (age 30); Mokpo, South Korea
- Education: KAIST Mathematical Sciences
- Occupation: Television personality
- Years active: 2014 - current
- Agents: Chorokbaem Juna E&M (2014-2017) Woollim Entertainment; (2017-2018)
- Parent: Oh Jeong-hwan

- Oh Hyun-min
- Hangul: 오현민
- Hanja: 吳炫旻
- RR: O Hyeonmin
- MR: O Hyŏnmin

Oh Hyun-min (Korean: 오현민; born June 6, 1995) is a South Korean television personality. He is known for being a finalist for the reality show, The Genius: Black Garnet and formerly a cast member in The Genius: Grand Final.

== Filmography ==
=== Television ===
Year	Title	Role	Network	Notes	Ref
2014	The Genius: Black Garnet	Himself	tvN	Oct 01 – Dec 17, 2014; Finalist	
2015	1 VS 100	Himself	KBS 2TV	Apr 07, 2015	
2015	The Genius: Grand Final	Himself	tvN	Jun 27 – Sep 05, 2015; Got into Top 3	
2015	Crisis Escape No. 1	Himself	KBS 2TV		
2015	Hello Counselor	Himself	KBS		
2015	Sell TV Time	Himself	tvN	Dec 10, 2015	
2015-16	Oh My Future 2035	Himself	EBS	Dec 28, 2015 –	
2015-16	Time Out	Himself	XTM		
2016	Code - Secret Room	Himself	JTBC	Won both Season 1 and 2	
2016	Crisis Escape No. 1	Himself	KBS 2TV	Jan 11, 2016	
2016	I Can See Your Voice 2	Himself	Mnet	Jan 14, 2016	
2016	Investors	Himself	SBS	May 15 – Jul 03, 2016	
2016	Oh My God	Himself	tvN	May 17, 2016	
2016	Finding Genius	Himself	SBS	May 25, 2016	
2016	Veteran Handmade Talkshow	Himself	SBS Plus	Oct 03, 2016	
2016	Tribe of Hip Hop 2	Himself	JTBC	Selected by Hot Chicks team, Eliminated in Eps 8	
2016	Watchman Expansion	Himself	OGN	Nov 24 – Dec 01, 2016	
2016	Lucky Race	Himself	Comedy TV	Nov 24 – Dec 01, 2016	
2016	Janghak Quiz	Himself	EBS	Dec 31, 2016	
2017	The Strongest Match	Himself	YouTube, Naver TV	Feb 17 – Apr 07, 2017	
2017	Game Show	Himself	SBS	Apr 08 – Apr 29, 2017	
2017	Finding Genius	Himself	SBS	May 3, 2017	
2017	Hello Counselor	Himself	KBS 2TV	May 22, 2017	
2017	2017 Woollim Pick	Himself	Mnet	May 30 & Jul 18, 2017	
2017	Game Man Lab	Himself	XTM	Jul 02, 2017	
2017	Hotscientists	Himself	XTM	Jul 24, 2017	
2017	Game Show	Himself	SBS	Sep 09 – Sep 23, 2017	
2017	Where Road	Himself	OBS	Oct 01 – Oct 22, 2017	
2018	Heard It Through the Grapevine	Himself	Channel A	Jan 15, 2018	
2018	Ranking Show 1,2,3	Himself	MBC	Mar 30, 2018	
2018	Ranking Show 1,2,3	Himself	MBC	Jun 08, 2018	
2018	There's A Reason Why Women Get Mad	Himself	TV Chosun	Jun 22 – Jul 27, 2018	
2018	Space Talk: Mystery Talk Show	Himself	Comedy TV	Aug 9 – Sep 20 (Thu), Oct 2 – Oct 30, 2018 (Tue)	
2018	Joint Study Area - JSA	Himself	E Channel	Sep 11 – Nov 13, 2018	
2018	KBS Chuseok special: War of Teachers	Himself	KBS 2TV	Sep 24, 2018	
2018	Finding Genius	Himself	SBS	Dec 19 – Dec 26, 2018	
2019	E-Game Thrones	Himself	KBS N Sports	Sep 9, 2019	
2019	Good Friends	Himself	SBS Plus	Sep 29 – Oct 20, 2019	
2020	Problematic Men	Himself	tvN	Feb 13, 2020	
