= The Genius: Grand Final =

2015 South Korean television season

- Winner: Jang Dong-min
- No. of episodes: 12

Release
- Original network: tvN
- Original release: June 27 – September 12, 2015

Season chronology
- ← Previous; The Genius: Black Garnet

The Genius: Grand Final (Korean: 더 지니어스: 그랜드 파이널) is the fourth season of The Genius. It debuted on tvN on June 27, 2015.

== Cast ==
(in alphabetical order)

- Choi Jung-moon S1
- Choi Yeon-seung S3
- Hong Jin-ho S1 & S2
- Jang Dong-min S3
- Kim Kyung-hoon S3
- Kim Kyung-ran S1
- Kim Yoo-hyun S3
- Lee Jun-seok S1
- Lee Sang-min S1 & S2
- Lim Yo-hwan S2
- Lim Yoon-sun S2
- Oh Hyun-min S3
- Yoo Jung-hyun S2

== Format Change ==
Garnet Match

With a similar gameplay with Main Matches, after every Garnet Match, the player(s) with the highest number of garnets will win the match and the player(s) with the lowest number of garnets will be the elimination candidate. If there is more than one player that has the fewest garnets, the winner(s) will select the elimination candidate before the elimination candidate picks his/her opponent. Garnets cannot be transferred between players during Garnet Matches.^{1}

The Main Matches for Episodes 2, 6 and 10 were Garnet Matches.

Death Match

Death matches in this season have been predetermined and are all games from past seasons. For every death match, both of the death match players are allowed to opt out a few games before one is randomly chosen out by the dealer. Players were allowed to choose 3 games in Episodes 1 and 2, 2 games in Episodes 3, 4 and 5 and 1 game in Episodes 6, 7 and 8. No more death matches can be opted out starting from Episode 9.

The following death matches as pre-determined for Season 4:

- Black and White (played in episode 1)
- Tactical Yutnori (played in episode 2)
- Betting! Rock, Paper, Scissors (played in episode 3)
- Same Number Hunt (played in episode 4)
- Indian Poker (played in episode 5)
- Monorail (played in episode 6)
- Same Picture Hunt (played in episode 7)
- Gyul! Hap! (played in episode 8)
- Quattro (played in episode 9)
- Double Sided Poker (played in episode 10)
- Twelve Janggi (played in episode 11)

== Episodes ==
Episode	Main/Garnet Match		Main/Garnet Match Winner(s)	Immunity receiver	Main/Garnet Match loser(s)	Appointed opponent	Death Match	Eliminated Player
1	ID Exchange		Lee Sang-Min	Oh Hyun-Min	Yoo Jung-Hyun	Lee Jun-Seok	Black and White	Yoo Jung-Hyun
2	Horror Race^{2}		Lee Sang-Min	Kim Kyung-Ran	Lim Yo-Hwan	Choi Yeon-Seung	Tactical Yutnori	Lim Yo-Hwan
3	Today's Menu		Oh Hyun-Min	Jang Dong-Min	Lee Sang-Min	Kim Kyung-Hoon	Betting Rock Paper Scissors	Lee Sang-Min
4	Fish Shop		Choi Yeon-Seung	Lee Jun-Seok	Oh Hyun-Min	Lim Yoon-Sun	Same Number Hunt	Lim Yoon-Sun
5	Loyalists and Rebels		Hong Jin-Ho; Jang Dong-Min; Oh Hyun-Min; Lee Jun-Seok; Choi Yeon-Seung; Kim Kyung-Hoon	-	Kim Kyung-Ran; Kim Yoo-Hyun	-	Indian Poker	Kim Yoo-Hyun
6	Garnet Thief^{2}		Hong Jin-Ho; Jang Dong-Min; Oh Hyun-Min; Kim Kyung-Ran; Kim Kyung-Hoon	-	Lee Jun-Seok	Choi Yeon-Seung	Monorail	Choi Yeon-Seung
7	Seed Poker		Jang Dong-Min	Oh Hyun-Min	Kim Kyung-Hoon	Choi Jung-Moon	Same Picture Hunt	Choi Jung-Moon
8	Minus Auction II		Hong Jin-Ho	Oh Hyun-Min	Kim Kyung-Ran	Jang Dong-Min	Gyul! Hap!	Kim Kyung-Ran
9	Horror Race II		Kim Poong (guest); Jang Dong-Min	Hong Jin-Ho	Kim Kyung-Hoon	Lee Jun-Seok	Quattro	Lee Jun-Seok
10	Cooperative Hold'em^{2}		Oh Hyun-Min	-	Hong Jin-Ho	Kim Kyung-Hoon	Double Sided Poker	Hong Jin-Ho
11	How Much		Kim Kyung-Hoon	-	Oh Hyun-Min; Jang Dong-Min	-	Twelve Janggi	Oh Hyun-Min
12	Finals	Number Janggi	Jang Dong-min		Kim Kyung-hoon			
12	Finals	Mystery Sign	Jang Dong-min		Kim Kyung-hoon			
12	Finals	Betting Black and White ^{3}						

Footnotes

^1 Garnet were allowed to be transferred between players for Rounds 3 and 7 for the game.

^2 Garnet Matches

^3 This game was not played during the death match, as Jang Dongmin has already won the 2 other games, namely Number Janggi and Mystery Sign. This meant that he has already won.

=== Elimination Chart ===
Ranking	Contestants	Rounds												MM WIN	DM IMM	DM WIN
Ranking	Contestants	1	2	3	4	5	6	7	8	9	10	11	12	MM WIN	DM IMM	DM WIN
1	Jang Dong-Min	IN	IN	IMM	IN	WIN	WIN	WIN	DM	WIN	IN	DM	Winner(2:0)	4	1	2
2	Kim Kyung-hoon	IN	IN	DM	IN	WIN	WIN	DM	IN	DM	DM	WIN	Runner-Up(0:2)	3	0	4
3	Oh Hyun-Min	IMM	IN	WIN	DM	WIN	WIN	IMM	IMM	IN	WIN	ELIM	Kim Kyung-Hoon	4	3	1
4	Hong Jin-ho	IN	IN	IN	IN	WIN	WIN	IN	WIN	IMM	ELIM		Jang Dong-Min	3	1	0
5	Lee Jun-seok	DM	IN	IN	IMM	WIN	DM	IN	IN	ELIM			Kim Kyung-Hoon	1	1	2
6	Kim Kyung-Ran	IN	IMM	IN	IN	DM	WIN	IN	ELIM				Jang Dong-Min	1	1	1
7	Choi Jung-Moon	IN	IN	IN	IN	IN	IN	ELIM					Jang Dong-Min	0	0	0
8	Choi Yeon-Seung	IN	DM	IN	WIN	WIN	ELIM						Jang Dong-Min	2	0	1
9	Kim Yoo-Hyun	IN	IN	IN	IN	ELIM							Kim Kyung-Hoon	0	0	0
10	Im Yoon-Sun	IN	IN	IN	ELIM								Kim Kyung-Hoon	0	0	0
11	Lee Sang-Min	WIN	WIN	ELIM									Kim Kyung-Hoon	2	0	0
12	Lim Yo-Hwan	IN	ELIM										Kim Kyung-Hoon	0	0	0
13	Yoo Jung-Hyun	ELIM											Jang Dong-Min	0	0	0
Garnets		23	45	49	49	47	69	76	75	90	100	132	132 (₩132,000,000)			

The finalist which the returning eliminated players chose to give the items.

== Main Matches ==
=== Episode 1: ID Exchange (13 contestants) ===
Each player is assigned an ID card. These cards can be officially and unofficially traded, and the player with the most points at the end of the game will win. Out of all 13 ID cards, there are 7 Commoner cards, 5 Noble cards, and 1 Convict card. All ID cards have the same appearance, and their identities can only be seen under a black light after an official trade takes place. Before the game, each player randomly draws their ID card and use the black light to see what they're assigned. During the game, players will execute official and unofficial trades with each other in order to gain points and avoid becoming the elimination candidate. Official trades are the only way to earn points and discover the identity of the card received, but they are limited. You may only officially trade with each player once. Unofficial trades are done without the permission of the dealers and can be done any number of times, but no points will be gained, and the black light will not be available to uncover an ID card's identity. To make an official trade, both players must approach the dealer's trading table and present an ID card. The cards will be swapped, and you will gain points depending on the identity of the card you traded away, and then the identity of the new card is revealed to both players. How to gain points? Noble and Convict card holders gain points by trading with a Commoner. Nobles gain 1 point by trading with a commoner. Convicts gain 2 points by trading with a commoner. However, the player with the convict card at the end of the game will be the elimination candidate. And the last player to officially trade away the convict card, regardless of the card they receive, will gain a bonus 3 points. The players must avoid being stuck with the convict card and figure out a way to gain the most points. Every 3 points will earn a player 1 garnet.

=== Episode 2: Horror Race (12 contestants) ===
This game is a garnet match.

In Horror Race you will make the characters you support win a race to obtain garnets. The characters are vampire, jiangshi (zombie), gumiho (nine-tailed fox), mummy, and zombie. These characters will race on a track with 12 spaces. Before the race, all 12 contestants choose 2 of these characters to support. However, the 3 characters not chosen will be put into the coin box. The characters chosen by the contestants will not be revealed. The characters coins added to the coin box will be used to move through the race. Contestants will draw 3 coins from the coin box, and place them in any combination of the 1, 2, or 4 movement squares. After every player has drawn 3 coins, the character with the most coins on a movement square will move that many spaces along the track. If more than one character has the highest coin total, the character with the next highest coin total will move. Once the last player places their coins, the round is over, and the characters are moved in the 1 box, then the 2 box, and finally the 4 box. Then the coins are replaced into the coin box and a new round begins. The order the players draw the coins in will be randomly determined at the start of the game, however, they will be able to influence this order. During a player's turn, they may surrender their coins and be able to draw last in the next round. Only one player may surrender their coins each round. Once a player surrenders their coins, the next player after them becomes the 1st player in the next round, and the player after them the 2nd, and so on. The rounds will continue until one character passes the finish line. The characters closest to the finish line at the end will be 2nd, and the next in line will be 3rd. Supporting the 1st-place finisher earns 3 garnets, 2nd place earns 2 garnets, and 3rd place earns 1 garnet. In the best possible outcome, the characters a player supports earning 1st and 2nd place, that player will earn 5 total garnets. The player with the most garnets after the end of the game will be the winner, and the player with the least will be the elimination candidate.

Although drawing from the coin box appears random, the vampire and mummy coins were made with steel cores, which are magnetic, while the others are made with brass cores, which are not magnetic. The players could have used the magnets on their name tags to tell the difference and obtain an advantage in the coin drawing process, but Jang Dong-Min managed to sense the slight weight difference between the steel and brass cores of the coin and tell them apart by feel alone, a feat the producers thought impossible, as the steel core coins were only 102 milligrams heavier than the brass core coins.

=== Episode 3: Today's Menu (11 contestants) ===
In Today's Menu, every player will order a meal, and then attempt to determine how many other players ordered the same meal to earn points. Every player has the option between jajangmyeon (noodles in a black bean sauce), jjamppong (spicy seafood noodle soup), and fried rice. The players have a card representing each item. When a round begins, every player will have 20 minutes to place their cards in their card box, with the dish they wish to order on top. These boxes are then unable to be opened. The players will then guess how many total orders were received of the dish they chose. They have the option between 1 order (worth 5 points), 2-3 orders (worth 3 points), 4-6 orders (worth 2 points), 7-10 orders (worth 1 point), and 11 orders (worth 4 points). Once every player has placed their box in the square representing their guess, everyone will have 1 minute to move their box and change their guess. After 1 minute, no one is able to change their guess anymore. The orders are revealed and everyone that guessed correctly will earn the appropriate number of points, players that guessed incorrectly earn nothing. For every 4 points a player receives, they will also receive 1 garnet. 4 rounds will be played in this manner, and the player with the highest point total wins, and the player with the lowest will be the elimination candidate.

The box is not as simple as it appears, and although the players are not told this, there is a false bottom within the box. This means it's possible to trick other players by showing them the fake guess that appears to be top of your box and closing it in front of them, causing the false bottom that hid your actual answer to fall and end up on top.

=== Episode 4: Fish Shop (10 contestants) ===
This game is similar to Fruit Stand, the first game in The Genius: Black Garnet.

The objective of Fish Shop is to earn the most money, done through collaborating with the competition to sell at high prices, or undercutting their trust. The fish sold in Fish Shop were hairtail, mackerel, and squid. Players are given 6 sales tickets to be used freely over the course of 4 rounds. Sales tickets can be traded in for the right to sell a fish (Sales tickets are non-transferable between players). Before the start of a round, a player must choose how many sales tickets to use, and what fish they wish to sell with those tickets. Once everyone submits their tickets in secret, the players selling each fish will be revealed. Players must then decide on an asking price for their fish, from a minimum of ₩1000 to a maximum of ₩5000, as long as the price is a full dollar increment. After everyone anonymously submits their offers, the selling price of the fish is revealed. Everyone's fish will be sold by the seller offering the lowest price. For example, if 4 people offered to sell a squid at ₩4000, while 1 person offered to sell the squid at ₩1000, the undercutter would sell everyone's squid and earn ₩5000. If multiple players offer the lowest price, they will split the total earnings. Players also have the choice to use either a Secret or a Check item once during the game. The Secret item allows you to hide the selling price of one type of fish for that round. The Check item will let you know your total earnings so far. The player who earns the most after 4 rounds wins, while the player that earns the least becomes the elimination candidate.

=== Episode 5: Loyalist and Rebels (9 contestants) ===
In Loyalist and rebels, the players were divided into two teams: Loyalist and Rebels. Loyalists must fill in 30 slots with numbers in ascending order without exceeding 1,000. Rebels must hide their identities and prevent the Loyalists from succeeding. All 9 players will draw lots so that 6 become loyalists and 3 become rebels. The loyalists will not know who the rebels are, while the rebels will know each other's identities. Every player will receive a random number from 1–9 to determine their order to enter the dealer room. When a player is in the dealer room, they will be presented with 4 digits. They must use those digits to place a number on either the A track, or the B track. For example, with digits 2, 3, 4, and 5, the first player may place a 2 on track A. However, these numbers must be ordered in ascending fashion. So a 1 could not be placed on the next slot in track A. Rebels can try to submit high numbers to the tracks, so that one of the tracks exceed a value of 1,000. However, only 1 digit can be added to the track value at a time. For example, if the track value of A is 5, a rebel could only submit a number with 2 digits. If their given digits were 2, 5, 7, 9, the highest value they could submit would be 97. At the end of every round, all players will vote on a King. The King will choose 2 players to send to jail for the next round, meaning they will not submit a number, and will not vote for a King in the next round. Tracks A and B each have 15 slots. If all 30 total slots are filled without either track exceeding 1,000, the loyalists will win. All of the loyalists will then receive a token of life and choose a reel to be the elimination candidate. If either track exceeds 1,000, the game will end and the rebels will win. However, the loyalists will have a final chance. All players not in prison will vote to elect the final king. No matter the outcome of their decision, the Final King will receive a token of life. The final king will choose 2 players to put in jail. If both players are rebels, the loyalists will get a comeback win, and the two rebels in jail will both play in the deathmatch. If at least one of them is a loyalist, the rebels will win, and all 3 rebels will receive a token of life. The rebels will then pick a loyalist (excluding the final king) to be the elimination candidate. If the loyalists win, they will each earn 1 garnet. If the rebels win, they will each be rewarded with 2 garnets.

The digits given to each player privately in the dealer room, while initially assumed to be random, actually followed the pattern of Pi. Fortunately for the loyalists, Choi Jung-Moon (an assigned rebel) happened to have Pi memorized to 100 digits. Jung-Moon handed the complete (unaltered) list of digits to the loyalists, making a rebel win essentially impossible, as they couldn't lie about what digits they received. This game continued the trend of non-traitors winning in hidden role "traitor" games. Non-traitors also won in Season 1's Zombie Game, and Season 3's Jury Game, meaning they went 3/3. Traitor games are especially difficult to balance, as the skills and influence of the few players selected to be traitors vary wildly. A perfectly balanced hidden role game may seem unbalanced if unskilled traitors are selected, and if highly skilled traitors are selected.

=== Ratings ===
As most Korean non-drama cable programs rarely reach 1 percent, these ratings are considered very high.
In the ratings below, the highest rating for the show will be in red, and the lowest rating for the show will be in blue

Episode #	Original airdate	AGB	Online
1	June 27, 2015	1.802%	36.5%
2	July 4, 2015	1.453%	39.4%
3	July 11, 2015	2.340%	40.1%
4	July 18, 2015	1.762%	35.9%
5	July 25, 2015	1.987%	39.0%
6	August 1, 2015	1.953%	40.1%
7	August 8, 2015	2.314%	43.0%
8	August 15, 2015	1.913%	39.9%
9	August 22, 2015	2.513%	45.1%
10	August 29, 2015	2.251%	46.0%
11	September 5, 2015	2.286%	45.9%
12	September 12, 2015	3.181%	48.0%
