= Lim Yoon-sun =

South Korean television personality and lawyer

- Born: November 17, 1978 (age 47); Chungju
- Occupations: Television personality, lawyer

Lim Yoon-sun (born November 17, 1978) is a South Korean television personality and lawyer. She was a cast member in the reality show The Genius: Rule Breaker and The Genius: Grand Final.
