= Rom&nd =

Cosmetics company

- Industry: Cosmetics
- Founded: 2016
- Area served: Worldwide
- Website: romandbeauty.com

Rom&nd is a South Korean cosmetic brand that is very popular in Japan and around the world, with one product being celebrated as a cult favorite and described as having Holy Grail status. In 2023, one product won the Olive Young Award for best lip tint, and was noted for being worn by Choi Hye-seon of Single's Inferno season three, while in 2025 the brand as a whole won the top prize in the makeup category at the K-Beauty Icon Awards. Its first global brand ambassador was Hannah Bahng, who created a new makeup line in tandem with the brand at their open office in Seoul.

In March 2024, Rom&nd partnered with Lawson to create a line of mini-size cosmetic products. Later in 2025, Rom&nd opened its first offline store in the Seongsu-dong neighborhood of Seoul.
