= Game of Blood =

South Korean reality series

- Promotional poster of the third season
- Genre: Reality television
- Country of origin: South Korea
- Original language: Korean
- No. of seasons: 3 (1 spin-off)

Original release
- Network: Wavve

Game of Blood (Korean: 피의 게임) also known as Bloody Game is a South Korean reality television series. The first season premiered on November 1, 2021, the second season on April 28, 2023, and the third season on November 15, 2024. A spin-off, X was released on July 3, 2026. Third season's debut press event was disrupted by the declaration of martial law.

The show is meant to be very unfair and very irrational. The players are encouraged to survive by all means possible, whether it be by lies, betrayals, and politics. Any actions made in the show is possible as long as the rules are followed.

== Season 1 ==
=== Players ===
List of contestants in Season 1
Player	Birth Year	Notes
Jeong Keun-woo	1982	2008 Summer Olympics gold medalist; Former professional baseball player who is considered as the best second baseman in Korean baseball history; Graduated from Korea University's Physical Education
Choi Yeon-sung	1984	Oriental medicine doctor; Graduated early from Gyeonggi Science High School; Graduated Medicine from Kyunghee University
Park Jae-il	1988	A travel creator with the ability to travel to the highest level with a single backpack and traveled to 30 countries around the world
Heo Joon-young	2000	Medical student from Yonsei University; Consistent class president from elementary to college
Song Seo-hyun	1997	Graduate student from Seoul National University; Graduated from Seoul National University with a double major in Consumer Studies and Economics
Park Ji-min	1991	MBC announcer; Graduated from Dongduk Women's University's Department of Performing Arts (Broadcast Entertainment); Has a Master's degree in Adult Counseling from Hanyang University
Queen WA$ABII	1994	Rapper; Graduated from Ewha Womans University's Educational Engineering
Lee Tae-gyun	1995	A Korean police officer working at Daegu Police Station
DEX	1995	A former UDT Navy Special Forces instructor
Lee Na-young	2002	An art student majoring in stage arts

=== Starting Funds ===
Player	Personal Funds
Lee Tae-gyun	₩65,000,000 (based on Song Seo-hyun's annual salary)
Choi Yeon-seung	₩60,000,000 (based on Park Ji-min's annual salary)
Park Ji-min	₩22,000,000 (based on DEX's annual salary)
Song Seo-hyun	₩20,000,000 (based on Heo Jun-young's annual salary)
DEX	₩30,000,000 (based on Lee Tae-gyun's annual salary)
Park Jae-il	₩50,000,000 (based on Queen WA$ABII's annual salary)
Lee Na-young	₩0
Jeong Keun-woo	₩100,000,000 (based on Choi Yeon-seung's annual salary)
Heo Jun-young	₩30,000,000 (based on Park Jae-il's annual salary)
Queen WA$ABII	₩100,000,000 (based on Jeong Keun-woo's annual salary)

=== Elimination Chart ===
Ranking	Contestants	Rounds										
Ranking	Contestants	1	2	3	4	6	7	8	9	10	11 (Game 1)	11 (Game 2)
1	Lee Tae-gyun	IN	IMM	BANISHED	BASEMENT		IN	WIN	IN	WIN	ADV	WINNER
2	Choi Yeon-seung	IN	WIN and BANISHED	BASEMENT			IN	WIN	IN	IMM	ADV	Runner-up
3	Park Ji-min	IN	WIN	IN	IN	WIN	WIN	IN	WIN	WIN	ELIMINATED	
3	Song Seo-hyun	IN	IMM	IN	IN	IN	WIN	LOW	WIN	IN	ELIMINATED	
5	DEX	IN	LOW	IN	IN	IN	WIN	IN	WIN	ELIMINATED		
5	Park Jae-il	IN	IN	WIN	IN	IN	WIN	IN	WIN	ELIMINATED		
7	Lee Na-young	BANISHED	BASEMENT				IN	WIN	ELIMINATED			
7	Jeong Keun-woo	IN	IN	IMM	BANISHED	BASEMENT	IN	WIN	ELIMINATED			
9	Heo Jun-young	IN	IN	IN	WIN	LOW	WIN	ELIMINATED				
10	Queen WA$ABII	IN	IN	IN	IN	BANISHED	ELIMINATED					

== Season 2 ==
List of contestants in Season 2
Player	Birth Year	Notes
Hong Jin-ho	1982	Master of Brain Survival Entertainment; Professional poker player and former StarCraft pro gamer; Winner of The Genius: Rules of the Game; Has a Master's degree in Game Engineering from Tech University of Korea
Ha Seung-jin	1985	The first Korean to join and play in NBA
DEX	1995	A former UDT Navy Special Forces instructor
Park Ji-min	1991	MBC announcer; Graduated from Dongduk Women's University's Department of Performing Arts (Broadcast Entertainment); Has a Master's degree in Adult Counseling from Hanyang University
Seo Chul-gu (Xitsuh)	1992	Rapper; Entered early with scholarship in Brigham Young University
Pi	1992	Internet broadcaster; Money Game contestant
Knucks	1992	World Champion Krump dancer; Graduated from Chung-Ang University's College of Social Sciences (Library and Information Science); Has a Master's degree in Sports Science from Sungkyunkwan University
Shin Hyun-ji	1996	Korea's Next Top Model Season 4 winner; Graduated from Korea Cyber University's Department of Practical Languages
Lee Jin-hyeong		A medical student from Seoul National University; Perfect CSAT scorer
Yurisa	1992	Model; Member of Mensa International with an IQ of156
Hyun Sung-joo	1990	Professional poker player; World Poker Tournament Champion; Graduated from Hankuk University of Foreign Studies
YunB	1992	Rapper; Graduated from New York University's College of Arts and Sciences (Philosophy)
Kerrigan May	1993	Rapper; Graduated from Ewha Womans University
Fujii Mina	1988	Actress; Graduated from Keio University's Department of Humanities and Sociology

=== Starting Funds ===
Player	Personal Funds
Lee Jin-hyung	₩20,000,000
DEX	₩0 (₩40,000,000)
Seo Chul-gu	₩40,000,000
Hong Jin-ho	₩0 (₩100,000,000)
Shin Hyun-ji	₩0 (₩150,000,000)
Pi	₩0 (₩70,000,000)
YunB	₩45,000,000
Ha Seung-jin	₩70,000,000
Knucks	₩40,000,000
Fujii Mina	₩100,000,000
Hyun Sung-ju	₩150,000,000
Yurisa	₩70,000,000
Park Ji-min	₩40,000,000
Kerrigan May	₩20,000,000

=== Elimination Chart ===
Ranking	Contestants	Rounds												
Ranking	Contestants	1	2	3	4	5	6	7	8	9	10	Semi-finals	Finals (Game 1)	Finals (Game 2)
1	Lee Jin-hyung	IN	IN	IN	IN	IN	IN	IMM	IN	DM	DM	ADV	ADV	WINNER
2	DEX	OUTSIDE		IMM	WIN	WIN	DM	IN	DM	IN	IN	ADV	ADV	Runner-up
3	Seo Chul-gu	IN and KIDNAPPED	OUTSIDE	IMM	WIN	WIN	WIN	WIN	IN	IN	IMM	ADV	ELIMINATED	
3	Hong Jin-ho	OUTSIDE		IMM	WIN	WIN	IN	DM	IN	IN	WIN	ADV	ELIMINATED	
5	Shin Hyun-ji	OUTSIDE		IMM	WIN	WIN	IN	IN	IN	WIN	IN	ELIMINATED		
6	Pi	ELIMINATED	IN (Note: Due to Kerrigan May's exit, Pi, the first eliminated player was revived and returned.)	IN	IN	IN	IN	IN	IN	IN	ELIMINATED			
7	YunB	IN	IN and KIDNAPPED	IMM	WIN	WIN	IN	IN	WIN	ELIMINATED				
8	Ha Seung-jin	IN	IN	IN	IN	IN	IN	IN	ELIMINATED					
9	Knucks	IN	WIN	IN	IN	IN	IN	ELIMINATED						
10	Fujii Mina	DM	IN	IN	IN	DM	ELIMINATED							
11	Hyun Sung-joo	IN	IN	IN	DM	ELIMINATED								
12	Yurisa	IMM	DM	DUNGEON	ELIMINATED									
13	Park Ji-min	IN	ELIMINATED											
14	Kerrigan May	IN and EXIT	NOT IN THE SHOW											

== Season 3 ==
List of contestants in Season 3
Player	Birth Year	Notes
Kim Kyung-ran	1977	Former KBS announcer; The strongest female player of all time; The Genius: Rules of the Game runner-up; Graduated Philosophy from Ewha Womans University
Kim Min-ah	1991	Weather caster; Graduated Elementary Education from Gyeongjin National University of Education
Kim Young-kwang	1983	Former national soccer player
Pani Bottle	1987	No. 1 domestic travel YouTuber in South Korea; Graduated from Seoul National University of Science and Technology's College of Art and Design
Seo Chul-gu (Xitsuh)	1992	Rapper; Entered early with scholarship in Brigham Young University
Steve Ye	1984	Professional poker player; 1st place in cumulative prize money
Kim Si-yoon	1991	Former member of U-KISS; Graduated Psychology from Columbia University
MJ Kim	1991	Former member of the US military and prison guard; Former MMA player; Society Game 1 runner up
Acau	1994	Game streamer
Yurisa	1992	Model; Member of Mensa International with an IQ of156
Gina Lee	1995	Influencer and broadcaster; Graduated early from University of Hong Kong's College of Business and Economics
Lim Hyun-seo	1991	Lawyer; Graduated Business Administration and Law from Seoul National University
Jang Dong-min	1979	Comedian; Emperor of Survival shows; Winner of The Genius: Black Garnet and The Genius: Grand Final
Joo Eun-kyu	1985	Economic YouTuber with 10 billion won in asset
Chungju Man	1987	YouTuber
Choi Hye-seon	1998	Influencer; Graduated Life Science from Ewha Womans University; Has a Master's degree in Life Science from Durham University
Heo Seong-beom	2000	Graduate student from KAIST; AI Researcher; Graduated from Korea Science Academy of KAIST; University War contestant
Hong Jin-ho	1982	Master of Brain Survival Entertainment; Professional poker player and former StarCraft pro gamer; Winner of The Genius: Rules of the Game; Has a Master's degree in Game Engineering from Tech University of Korea

=== Starting Funds ===
Player	Personal Funds
Jang Dong-min	₩258,000,000
Acau	₩170,000,000
Heo Seong-beom	₩15,000,000
Hong Jin-ho	₩12,000,000
Kim Min-ah	₩100,000,000
Seo Chul-gu	₩60,000,000
Steve Yea	₩200,000,000
Joo Eon-kyu	₩27,000,000
MJ Kim	₩37,000,000
Choi Hye-seon	₩31,000,000
Yurisa	₩37,000,000
Chungju Man	₩40,000,000
Gina Lee	₩60,000,000
Pani Bottle	₩0
Lim Hyun-seo	₩0
Kim Si-yoon	₩9,000,000
Kim Kyung-ran	₩100,000,000
Kim Young-kwang	₩0

=== Elimination Chart ===
Key
Player won the money challenge and exempt from elimination.
Player who faced Death Match and survived.
Player who faced Death Match and eliminated.
Player who was sent to Remaining.
Player who was sent to Prison.
Player received immunity by exemption card.

Ranking	Contestants	Rounds												
Ranking	Contestants	Preliminary Game	1	2	3	4	5	6	7	Pre-Finals (First Stage)	Pre-Finals (Second Stage)	Finals (Round 1)	Finals (Round 2)	Finals (Round 3)
1	Jang Dong Min	IN	IMM and REMAINING	REMAINING and WIN	IN	DM	WIN	DM	WIN	IN	ADV	WIN	2nd Place	WINNER
2	Acau	IN	WIN and KIDNAPPED	REMAINING and WIN	IN	IN	WIN	IN	IN	ADV		4th Place	WIN	RUNNER-UP
2	Hong Jinho	DM and IN (Spy)	REMAINING and IN	IN	WIN	IN	REMAINING	IN	WIN	ADV		3rd Place	3rd Place	RUNNER-UP
2	Heo Seong-Beom	IN	WIN and REMAINING	REMAINING and WIN	IN	WIN	WIN	IN	IN	IN	ADV	2nd Place	4th Place	RUNNER-UP
5	Steve Yea	IN	DM and REMAINING	IN	WIN	IN	DM and REMAINING	IN	WIN	IN	ELIMINATED			
5	Seo Chul-gu (Xitsuh)	IN	DM and PRISON	PRISON and DM	IN	IN	REMAINING	IN	IN	IN	ELIMINATED			
5	Kim Min-ah	IN	IMM	IN	IN	IN	WIN	IN	IN	IN	ELIMINATED			
5	Joo Eon-kyu	IN	DM and REMAINING	IN	WIN	IN	WIN	IN	WIN	IN	ELIMINATED			
9	MJ Kim	IN	IN and REMAINING	REMAINING and WIN	IN	IN	WIN	IN	ELIMINATED					
9	Choi Hye-seon	DM and REMAINING	REMAINING and IN	IN	WIN	IN	REMAINING	WIN	ELIMINATED					
11	Yurisa	IN	IN	PRISON and DM	IN	IMM	WIN	ELIMINATED						
11	Chungju Man	IN	IN	IN	IN	IN	REMAINING	ELIMINATED						
13	Gina Lee	IN	IN	IN	DM	IN	ELIMINATED							
14	Lim Hyun Seo	DM and REMAINING	REMAINING and IN	IN	WIN	ELIMINATED								
14	Pani Bottle	IN	DM and REMAINING	IN	WIN	ELIMINATED								
16	Kim Si Yoon	IN	IN and REMAINING	REMAINING and WIN	ELIMINATED									
17	Kim Kyung Ran	IN	IN	ELIMINATED										
18	Kim Young Kwang	DM and PRISON	PRISON and ELIMINATED	ELIMINATED										

== X ==
List of contestants in Game of Blood X
Team (Note: After the fourth Money Challenge and Deathmatch, the teams are abolished and the players would start playing individually.)	Player	Birth Year	Notes
Rookies (A team composed of survival show novices)	Kwak Beom	1986	Comedian; Mission Code Red participant
Rookies (A team composed of survival show novices)	Shin Seung-yong	1992	Dermatologist; Graduated from Seoul National University
Rookies (A team composed of survival show novices)	Lee Gwan-hee	1988	Basketball Player; Graduated from Yonsei University
Rookies (A team composed of survival show novices)	Choi Yeon-cheong	1993	Actress and Model active in China; Miss Korea 2013 participant; Member of Mensa International; Graduated from Dankook University
Challengers (A team composed of members who participated in other survival shows but new to Game of Blood)	Kang Ji-hoo	2004	attending KAIST's Department of Mathematics; Graduated early from Gyeonggibuk Science High School; Presidential Scholarship Awardee; International Chess Tournament runner-up; Fluent in 6 languages; University War 3 participant
Challengers (A team composed of members who participated in other survival shows but new to Game of Blood)	Kim Kyung-hoon	1988	Entrepreneur; Graduated from University of Illinois Urbana-Champaign and Seoul National University; The Genius: Black Garnet participant and The Genius: Grand Final runner up
Challengers (A team composed of members who participated in other survival shows but new to Game of Blood)	Kim Nam-hee	1989	Former announcer; Member of Mensa International; Graduated from Sookmyung Women's University; The Time Hotel participant
Challengers (A team composed of members who participated in other survival shows but new to Game of Blood)	Kim Yoo-hyun	1988	Professional poker player; Start-up CEO; Graduated from University of Illinois Urbana-Champaign; The Genius: Black Garnet and The Genius: Grand Final participant
P1 (Represents Season 1)	Park Ji-min	1991	MBC announcer; Graduated from Dongduk Women's University's Department of Performing Arts (Broadcast Entertainment); Has a Master's degree in Adult Counseling from Hanyang University
P1 (Represents Season 1)	Lee Sang-min	1973	Singer; The Genius: Rules of the Game and The Genius: Grand Final participant; The Genius: Rule Breaker Winner
P1 (Represents Season 1)	Lee Tae-gyun	1995	Lawyer; A Korean police officer working at Daegu Police Station; Graduated Public Administration from Seoul National University; Winner of Season 1
P1 (Represents Season 1)	Jeong Keun-woo	1982	2008 Olympic gold medalist; Former professional baseball player who is considered as the best second baseman in Korean baseball history; Graduated Physical Education from Korea University
P2 (Represents Season 2)	Hyun Sung-joo	1990	Professional poker player; World Poker Tournament Champion; Graduated from Hankuk University of Foreign Studies
P2 (Represents Season 2)	YunB	1992	Rapper; Graduated Philosophy from New York University
P2 (Represents Season 2)	Lee Jin-hyeong		Doctor; Graduated Medicine from Seoul National University; Perfect CSAT scorer; Game of Blood Season 2 winner
P2 (Represents Season 2)	Ha Seung-jin	1985	The first Korean to join and play in NBA
P3 (Represents Season 3)	Xitsuh	1992	Rapper; Entered early with scholarship in Brigham Young University
P3 (Represents Season 3)	Choi Hye-seon	1998	Influencer; Graduated Life Science from Ewha Womans University; Has a Master's degree in Life Science from Durham University
P3 (Represents Season 3)	Heo Seong-beom	2000	Graduate student from KAIST's Graduate School of AI; AI Researcher; Graduated Computer Science from KAIST; Got a priority admission and graduated from Korea Science Academy of KAIST; University War 1 contestant
P3 (Represents Season 3)	Hong Jin-ho	1982	Master of Brain Survival Entertainment; Professional poker player and former StarCraft pro gamer; Winner of The Genius: Rules of the Game; Has a Master's degree in Game Engineering from Tech University of Korea

=== Starting Funds ===
Team	Funds
R	₩180,000,000
C	₩240,000,000
P1	₩270,000,000
P2	₩200,000,000
P3	₩280,000,000

=== Personal Funds ===
Player	Funds
Jeong Keun-woo	₩70,000,000
Park Ji-min	₩80,000,000
Lee Tae-gyun	₩80,000,000
YunB	₩0
Hong Jin-ho	₩90,000,000
Seo Chul-gu	₩90,000,000
Choi Hye-seon	₩90,000,000
Heo Seong-beom	₩90,000,000
Kang Ji-hoo	₩0
Kwak Beom	₩20,000,000
Hyun Sung-joo	₩20,000,000
Shin Seung-yong	₩20,000,000

=== Game Summary ===
Preliminary Game: Team First Come First Served

The entire team must escape from the restraints after solving the puzzle or breaking free from the restraints. Three sets of problems was shown with an interval of 30 seconds and must be multiplied. Any team whose members are not able to break free are automatically nominated for elimination. The winning teams will be able to select their starting funds in order.

==== Progress Result ====
Rank	Team	Fund
1	P1 (Sang-min, Keun-woo, Ji-min, Tae-gyun)	₩270,000,000 (based on P1's combined converted 2025 annual salary)
2	P2 (Seung-jin, Sung-joo, YunB, Jin-hyeong)	₩200,000,000 (based on P3's combined converted 2025 annual salary)
3	P3 (Jin-ho, Chul-gu, Hye-seon, Seong-beom)	₩280,000,000 (based on R's combined converted 2025 annual salary)
4	C (Kyung-hoon, Yoo-hyun, Nam-hee, Jihoo)	₩270,000,000 (based on C's combined converted 2025 annual salary)
(Note: As the last team to break free from the restraints, they were left stranded in the abandoned house and unable to participate in the first money challenge.)	R (Beom, Gwan-hee, Seung-yong, Yeon-cheong)	-

Money Challenge 1: Running Mate

==== Progress Result ====
Rank	Team	Rounds								
Rank	Team	1R	2R	3R	4R	5R	6R	7R	8R	Total Scores
1	P3	0	5	+5	+5	+6	+4	+4	+4	33
2	C	0	0	+5	0	+6	+4	-4	+4	15
4	P1	+5	+5	0	0	0	-4	+4	+4	14
4	P2	+5	0	0	+5	0	+4	+4	-4	14

Death Match 1: Mosaic Puzzle

==== Voting Results ====
Player	Vote/s			Results
Lee Sang-min	Lee Tae-gyun			Lee Tae-gyun, Lee Jin-hyeong, Kim Nam-hee, Lee Gwanhee, Shin Seung-yong, and Choi Yeon-cheong goes to the deathmatch.
Jeong Keun-woo	Lee Tae-gyun			Lee Tae-gyun, Lee Jin-hyeong, Kim Nam-hee, Lee Gwanhee, Shin Seung-yong, and Choi Yeon-cheong goes to the deathmatch.
Park Ji-min	Lee Tae-gyun			Lee Tae-gyun, Lee Jin-hyeong, Kim Nam-hee, Lee Gwanhee, Shin Seung-yong, and Choi Yeon-cheong goes to the deathmatch.
Lee Tae-gyun	Lee Tae-gyun			Lee Tae-gyun, Lee Jin-hyeong, Kim Nam-hee, Lee Gwanhee, Shin Seung-yong, and Choi Yeon-cheong goes to the deathmatch.
Ha Seung-jin	Lee Jin-hyeong			Lee Tae-gyun, Lee Jin-hyeong, Kim Nam-hee, Lee Gwanhee, Shin Seung-yong, and Choi Yeon-cheong goes to the deathmatch.
Hyun Sung-joo	Lee Jin-hyeong			Lee Tae-gyun, Lee Jin-hyeong, Kim Nam-hee, Lee Gwanhee, Shin Seung-yong, and Choi Yeon-cheong goes to the deathmatch.
YunB	Lee Jin-hyeong			Lee Tae-gyun, Lee Jin-hyeong, Kim Nam-hee, Lee Gwanhee, Shin Seung-yong, and Choi Yeon-cheong goes to the deathmatch.
Lee Jin-hyeong	Lee Jin-hyeong			Lee Tae-gyun, Lee Jin-hyeong, Kim Nam-hee, Lee Gwanhee, Shin Seung-yong, and Choi Yeon-cheong goes to the deathmatch.
Kim Kyung-hoon	Kim Nam-hee			Lee Tae-gyun, Lee Jin-hyeong, Kim Nam-hee, Lee Gwanhee, Shin Seung-yong, and Choi Yeon-cheong goes to the deathmatch.
Kim Yoo-hyun	Kim Nam-hee			Lee Tae-gyun, Lee Jin-hyeong, Kim Nam-hee, Lee Gwanhee, Shin Seung-yong, and Choi Yeon-cheong goes to the deathmatch.
Kim Nam-hee	Kang Ji-hoo			Lee Tae-gyun, Lee Jin-hyeong, Kim Nam-hee, Lee Gwanhee, Shin Seung-yong, and Choi Yeon-cheong goes to the deathmatch.
Kang Ji-hoo	Kim Nam-hee			Lee Tae-gyun, Lee Jin-hyeong, Kim Nam-hee, Lee Gwanhee, Shin Seung-yong, and Choi Yeon-cheong goes to the deathmatch.
Kwak Beom	Lee Gwan-hee	Shin Seung-yong	Choi Yeon-cheong	Lee Tae-gyun, Lee Jin-hyeong, Kim Nam-hee, Lee Gwanhee, Shin Seung-yong, and Choi Yeon-cheong goes to the deathmatch.
Lee Gwan-hee	Lee Gwan-hee	Shin Seung-yong	Choi Yeon-cheong	Lee Tae-gyun, Lee Jin-hyeong, Kim Nam-hee, Lee Gwanhee, Shin Seung-yong, and Choi Yeon-cheong goes to the deathmatch.
Shin Seung-yong	Lee Gwan-hee	Shin Seung-yong	Choi Yeon-cheong	Lee Tae-gyun, Lee Jin-hyeong, Kim Nam-hee, Lee Gwanhee, Shin Seung-yong, and Choi Yeon-cheong goes to the deathmatch.
Choi Yeon-cheong	Lee Gwan-hee	Shin Seung-yong	Choi Yeon-cheong	Lee Tae-gyun, Lee Jin-hyeong, Kim Nam-hee, Lee Gwanhee, Shin Seung-yong, and Choi Yeon-cheong goes to the deathmatch.

==== Progress Result ====
Team	Player	Points	Results
R	Lee Gwan-hee	28	SURVIVED
P1	Lee Tae-gyun	25	SURVIVED
C	Kim Nam-hee	24	SURVIVED
R	Shin Seung-yong	21	SURVIVED
P2	Lee Jin-hyeong	19	SURVIVED
R	Choi Yeon-cheong	18	ELIMINATED

Money Challenge 2: Mystery Time

The game has two rounds. In the first round, all five teams will participate and in the second round, only four teams would participate excluding the team who won the first round. The players can ask 3 questions every entry in the voting room and each question adds 1 minute to the player's time.

==== Progress Result ====
Rank	Team	Results
1	P3	Won Round 1 Received ₩50 million All members are excluded from elimination
2	P1	All members are excluded from elimination
3	C	Member with the least cumulative time will be nominated for death match
4	R	Member with the least cumulative time will be nominated for death match
5	P2	Member with the most cumulative time will automatically be in death match

Death Match 2: 3-Story Omok

==== Voting Results ====
Player	Vote/s					Results
Lee Sang-min	Kim Yoo-hyun					Lee Gwan-hee goes to the deathmatch.
Jeong Keun-woo	Kim Yoo-hyun					Lee Gwan-hee goes to the deathmatch.
Park Ji-min	Kim Yoo-hyun					Lee Gwan-hee goes to the deathmatch.
Lee Tae-gyun	Kim Yoo-hyun					Lee Gwan-hee goes to the deathmatch.
Ha Seung-jin	Lee Gwan-hee					Lee Gwan-hee goes to the deathmatch.
Hyun Sung-joo	-					Lee Gwan-hee goes to the deathmatch.
YunB	Lee Gwan-hee					Lee Gwan-hee goes to the deathmatch.
Lee Jin-hyeong	Kim Yoo-hyun					Lee Gwan-hee goes to the deathmatch.
Hong Jin-ho	Lee Gwan-hee					Lee Gwan-hee goes to the deathmatch.
Seo Chul-gu	Lee Gwan-hee		Lee Gwan-hee			Lee Gwan-hee goes to the deathmatch.
Choi Hye-seon	Kim Yoo-hyun					Lee Gwan-hee goes to the deathmatch.
Heo Seong-beom	Lee Gwan-hee					Lee Gwan-hee goes to the deathmatch.
Kim Kyung-hoon	Lee Gwan-hee	Lee Gwan-hee	Lee Gwan-hee	Lee Gwan-hee	Lee Gwan-hee	Lee Gwan-hee goes to the deathmatch.
Kim Yoo-hyun	Lee Gwan-hee					Lee Gwan-hee goes to the deathmatch.
Kim Nam-hee	Lee Gwan-hee					Lee Gwan-hee goes to the deathmatch.
Kang Ji-hoo	Lee Gwan-hee					Lee Gwan-hee goes to the deathmatch.
Kwak Beom	Kim Yoo-hyun		Kim Yoo-hyun			Lee Gwan-hee goes to the deathmatch.
Lee Gwan-hee	Kim Yoo-hyun					Lee Gwan-hee goes to the deathmatch.
Shin Seung-yong	Kim Yoo-hyun		Kim Yoo-hyun			Lee Gwan-hee goes to the deathmatch.

Hyun Sung-joo from P2 automatically became a death match player. Lee Gwan-hee from R and Kim Yoo-hyun from C became the death match nominees. After the voting, Lee Gwan-hee lost the votings.

==== Progress Result ====
Team	Player	Results
P2	Hyun Sung-joo	SURVIVED
R	Lee Gwan-hee	ELIMINATED

Due to Lee Gwan-hee's elimination, the winner of the death match, Hyun Sung-joo automatically became a member of R.

Money Challenge 3: Blind Auction

==== Progress Result ====
Rank	Team	Final Money
1	P1 (Sang-min, Keun-woo, Ji-min, Tae-gyun)	₩26,500,005,000
2	C (Kyung-hoon, Yoo-hyun, Nam-hee, Jihoo)	₩14,800,002,500
3	R (Beom, Sung-joo Seung-yong)	₩10,100,005,000
4	P3 (Jin-ho, Chul-gu, Hye-seon, Seong-beom)	₩400,009,000
5	P2 (Seung-jin, YunB, Jin-hyeong)	₩0

Death Match 3: Hellish Morning Commute

The third death match is a team elimination match.

==== Progress Result ====
Team	Results
P3 (Jin-ho, Chul-gu, Hye-seon, Seong-beom)	SURVIVED
P2 (Seung-jin, YunB, Jin-hyeong)	ELIMINATED

The Day of Plunder

P3, who won the third deathmatch goes to the abandoned building. P3 purchased the Pandora box through the Ghost Casino and opened it, revealing the rules for the Day of Plunder. 5 safe boxes are scattered around the mansion, the safes must be opened in succeeding order as each safe contained the code for the next safe. The first four safes has ₩50,000,000 each. After unlocking the fourth safe, the fifth safe who has ₩200,000,000 will automatically be opened.

=== Progress Result ===
Teams		Acquired Funds	Total Funds
Indoor Alliance Team	R	₩59,000,000 (Total acquired money: ₩118,000,000)	₩69,000,000
Indoor Alliance Team	C	₩59,000,000 (Total team acquired money: ₩118,000,000)	₩99,000,000
Outdoor Alliance Team	P1	₩37,000,000 (Total acquired money: ₩74,000,000)	₩207,000,000
Outdoor Alliance Team	P3	₩37,000,000 (Total acquired money: ₩74,000,000)	₩317,000,000

Money Challenge 4: Equation Combo

==== Progress Result ====
Team	Results
Indoor Alliance Team (R and C)	LOST
Outdoor Alliance Team (P1 and P3)	WINNER

Death Match 4: Ring the Bell

==== Progress Result ====
Revival Match: Memory Maze

==== Progress Result ====
Money Challenge 5: Killer Game

==== Progress Result ====
Death Match 5: High and Low

All of the players who did not won the game are automatically nominated. Only the winners of the fifth death match are allowed to vote. The selected candidates will then select two more players for the death match.

==== Voting Results ====
Player	Votes
Lee Tae-gyun	- (After the voting, he selected Seo Chul-gu for the death match.)
Hong Jin-ho	- (After the voting, he selected Jeong Keun-woo for the death match.)
Choi Hye-seon	Jeong Keun-woo
Heo Seong-beom	Lee Tae-gyun
Kang Ji-hoo	Lee Tae-gyun
Kwak Beom	Hong Jin-ho
Hyun Sung-joo	Lee Tae-gyun
Shin Seung-yong	Hong Jin-ho

==== Progress Result ====
Player	Points	Results
Hong Jin-ho	9 points	SURVIVED
Jeong Keun-woo	6 points	SURVIVED
Lee Tae-gyun	0 points	ELIMINATED
Seo Chul-gu	-16 points	ELIMINATED

Money Challenge 6: Project Galaxy

==== Progress Result ====
Death Match 6: Mix and Match

The bottom two players, Shin Seung-yong and Kwak Beom automatically became candidates for the death match. Each player could nominate another player as a candidate for the death match with the exception of Heo Seong-beom and Hong Jin-ho. They nominated Jeong Keun-woo and Park Ji-min.

==== Voting Results ====
Player	Votes
Jeong Keun-woo	Jeong Keun-woo
Park Ji-min	Park Ji-min
Hong Jin-ho	Park Ji-min
Choi Hye-seon	Jeong Keun-woo
Heo Seong-beom	Park Ji-min
Kang Ji-hoo	Park Ji-min
Hyun Sung-joo	Jeung Keun-woo
YunB	Park Ji-min

==== Progress Result ====
Player	Points	Results
Shin Seung-yong	12	SURVIVED
Kwak Beom	8	ELIMINATED
Park Ji-min	6	ELIMINATED

Semi Finals Game: Prediction Race

This money challenge is the semi-finals game. The bottom four players are automatically eliminated without death match.

=== Elimination Chart ===
Key
Player won the money challenge and exempted from elimination.
Player who faced Death Match and survived.
Player who faced Death Match and eliminated.
Player who remained or sent and outside.
Player who was initially eliminated and revived.
Player received immunity by exemption card.

Ranking	Team		Contestants	Rounds								
Ranking	Team		Contestants	1	2	3	4	5	6	SF	FINAL	
Ranking	Team		Contestants	1	2	3	4	5	6	SF	1 & 2	3
1	C		Kang Ji-hoo	IN	IN	IN	ELIMINATED	REVIVED and WON	IN	WIN (1st place)	ADVANCED	WINNER
2	P2		YunB	IN	IN	ELIMINATED		REVIVED and IN	IN	WIN (2nd place)	ADVANCED	Runner-up
3	P3		Heo Seong-beom	WIN	WIN	OUTSIDE and DM	WIN	WIN	WIN	WIN (3rd place)	ELIMINATED	
3	P2 →	R (Note: Due to Gwan-hee's elimination, he moved to Team R due to its lacking members.)	Hyun Sung-joo	IN	DM	IN	DM	WIN	IN	WIN (4th place)	ELIMINATED	
5	P3		Choi Hye-seon	WIN	WIN	OUTSIDE and DM	WIN	WIN	IN	ELIMINATED		
5	R		Shin Seung-yong	OUTSIDE and DM	IN	IN	DM	WIN	DM	ELIMINATED		
5	P3		Hong Jin-ho	WIN	WIN	OUTSIDE and DM	WIN	DM	IMMUNE	ELIMINATED		
5	P1		Jeong Keun-woo	IN	IN	WIN	WIN	DM	IN	ELIMINATED		
9	R		Kwak Beom	OUTSIDE	IN	IN	DM	WIN	ELIMINATED			
9	P1		Park Ji-min	IN	IN	WIN	WIN	IN	ELIMINATED			
11	P3		Seo Chul-gu	WIN	WIN	OUTSIDE and DM	WIN	ELIMINATED				
11	P1		Lee Tae-gyun	DM	IN	WIN	WIN	ELIMINATED				
UR	P1		Lee Sang-min	IN	IN	WIN	WIN	WITHDRAWN (Note: Due to a family emergency, Lee Sang-min withdrew from the game.)				
13	C		Kim Kyung-hoon	IN	IN	IN	ELIMINATED					
13	C		Kim Nam-hee	DM	IN	IN	ELIMINATED					
13	C		Kim Yoo-hyun	IN	IN	IN	ELIMINATED					
16	P2		Lee Jin-hyeong	DM	IN	ELIMINATED						
16	P2		Ha Seung-jin	IN	IN	ELIMINATED						
18	R		Lee Gwan-hee	OUTSIDE and DM	ELIMINATED							
19	R		Choi Yeon-cheong	ELIMINATED								

== Citation ==
=== Notes ===
Notes about the show
