= Choi Hye-seon =

South Korean model (born 1998)

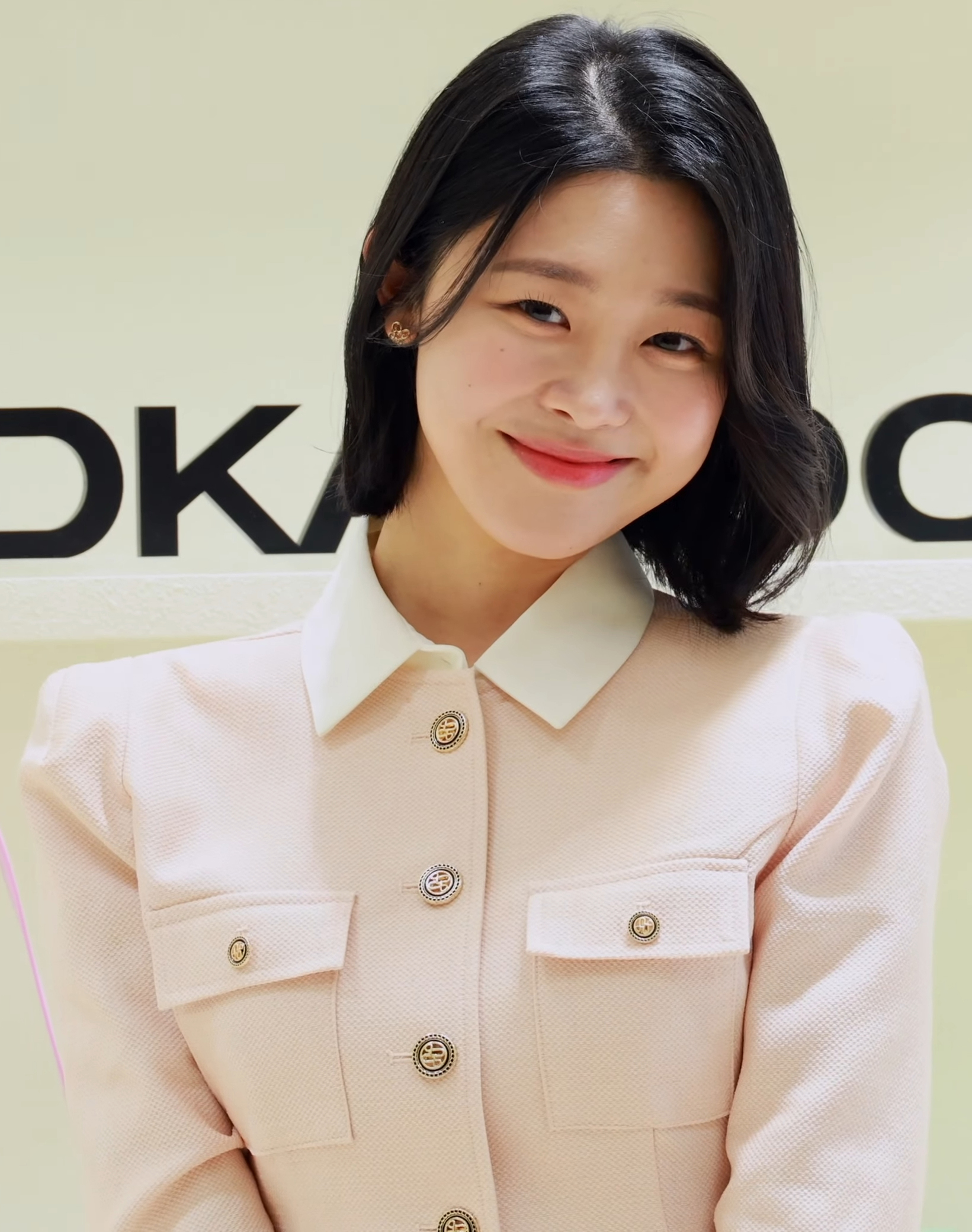
- Choi in 2024
- Born: June 21, 1998 (age 28); South Korea
- Other name: Hazel Choi
- Education: Durham University (MSc); Ewha Womans University (BSc)
- Occupation: Model
- Years active: 2021–present
- Modeling information
- Agency: Mood Brand Consulting

Korean name
- Hangul: 최혜선
- RR: Choe Hyeseon
- MR: Ch'oe Hyesŏn

Choi Hye-seon (Korean: 최혜선; born 1998) is a South Korean model. She gained attention through her appearance in the series Single's Inferno Season 3 (2023–2024), including for the way she tearfully shared her joy and emotions, her high self-esteem and honest confidence, and being the most prominent name of her season, due to her social and likeable personality and skillful and intelligent behavior. Later retrospectives described her as a star who drove the program's box office. While on the show, her Instagram followers rose from 2,000 to 1,600,000, and she was the first of the cast to reach 1,000,000 followers. Following the attention she received as the show aired, she took a break from social media. As of November 2024, Choi still got along well with the other contestants, often kept in touch with Yun Ha-jeong, and later reunited with many others. She continued to be involved in later seasons, watching the fifth season before participating in a photoshoot with other alumna.

She later returned to social media, including appearances at events such as a Jujutsu Kaisen and Casetify collaboration in early 2024 where she surprised fans with her British accent. Her second reality show appearance came on Game of Blood, whose production presentation she attended with the rest of the cast in Seoul. Her season received the top spot in TV-OTT topicality ratings, ranked first overall in new paid subscriptions, ranked first in the non-drama topicality category, and the female cast including Choi were nominated for a Blue Dragon Series Award in the category of Female Entertainer Award / Rookie Female Entertainer Award.

Choi's return to Game of Blood set the highest record ever for the franchise in the number of new paid subscriptions on Wavve, which ranked first in viewing time across all genres and viewership. Her unique positive energy and sharp judgment were credited as the center of success, with the second week seeing even higher viewership. The season continued to be popular after its premiere, ranking first in its category's Good Data Corporation Fundex chart for the first, second, and fourth weeks of July, ranking first in viewing time for six straight weeks, and topping the original non-drama and online reaction categories. From the premiere until the last episode, her season held the number one spot in new paid subscriptions every week.

== Early life and education ==
Choi lived in the United States until middle school, and was racially discriminated against at that time, before attending an all girls high school in Korea. She majored in bioinformatics at the Life Sciences department of Ewha Womans University, graduated with a Bachelor of Science degree, and previously held internships at Seoul National University's Department of Biomedical Sciences as well as Cipherome, a Silicon Valley startup.

In Choi's early 20s she befriended Shin Ae-jin, who would die in the Itaewon Tragedy. Choi later contributed a testimonial to a book of grieving essays written by Shin's father. Choi attended Durham University and as of November 2024 lived in the UK, after having obtained a master's degree in data science, bioinformatics, and biological modeling in October 2024. She received her official diploma in January 2025.

== Career ==
Before Choi's appearance on Single's Inferno 3, she modeled for Andar and Round Lab, Joy Gryson, Nature Republic and 29CM, as well as Swarovski, Sulwhasoo and Maybelline. She and the rest of the Single's Inferno 3 cast modeled for Dazed as the show was airing. After her rise to fame, a 2021 modeling experience with Enhypen came to light. While on the program, she notably wore a Rom&nd's lip tint which later won a 2023 Olive Young Award, and was described as not only beautiful and having a good personality, but also smart and educated. She also maintained a workout routine five days a week of weight training, gym, yoga, and running, and kept a strict diet. After the show ended, she started a YouTube channel that she originally intended to devote to ASMR.

Choi reunited with fellow Single's Inferno 3 participant Yu Si-eun to model for Alice + Olivia after the show's finale, and her outfit of the day looks were compared to castmate Cho Min-ji's. In June 2024, Dentiste selected Choi as the star of their new brand campaign, launching with two videos on Dentiste's YouTube channel. Later in 2024, she modeled for lululemon before being selected as ambassador for F&F's Sergio Tacchini brand for the rest of the year. She also modeled for Olay, Fila, and Skin Food. At the end of 2024, she was featured in volume 33 of Olive Young's My Precious editorial.

After Choi's appearance on Game of Blood 3, she was invited to the Ganni Show at Paris Fashion Week in early 2025, as well as the EENK show with Single's Inferno 4 participant Chung You-jin, a fellow Ewha Women's University alumna. Chung and her castmate Kook Dong-ho collaborated with Choi on an avatar blind date for Esquire, during which she revealed that her Myers-Briggs Type Indicator was ENFP. A later social media post from Choi attracted media attention, and comment from Chung herself. Choi also modeled for Max Mara in Granada and attended the grand launch event for the item she modeled. Her 2025 birthday party received media coverage, including acknowledgment of her master's degree.

Choi hosted the premiere episode of Olive Young's These Days All Young program along with Park Hye-rim, also known as Harimu, who appeared on the reality show Street Woman Fighter 2. Choi later modeled for Calvin Klein and was invited as Korea's representative to Longchamp's global influencer event in London, before reuniting with Max Mara at their runway collection in Milan and attending No.21's spring show. As of early 2026, she worked as a data scientist consultant, and was later selected to participate in HK inno.N's Zero Sugar Campaign due to her "confident charm" in dating entertainment, before being selected as a new brand model for Allergan's Skinvive and Juvéderm due to her unique natural and healthy charm.

Choi's candid appearances attracted media attention, as in Lisbon, when her past media appearances were noted along with her contemporary natural expression and feminine silhouette. She continued her association with Max Mara at the Florence global launch event of a new edition of an item she had previously modeled, touring farms, beehives, and palazzos. Choi's return to Game of Blood was met with a wave of media attention, describing her as a participant skilled in brain play, a veteran brain survival player of psychological battles, possessing veteran charisma and an overwhelming aura, and promising powerful team play. In episode four of that season, she used her laughter, blunt statements, and active communication to try and save a fellow cast member from being eliminated from the show. Her personal appearances around this time drew media attention. One celebrated her healthy look and unique bright and confident charm, likening her to human vitamins, while another publicized how she perfectly embodied Ascot fashion with a touch of luxury, attending the Royal Ascot like a scene straight out of a movie. Later, while traveling in Paris, she boasted a healthy side.

Even years after her appearance on Single's Inferno, Choi's popularity persisted, and she was known to be smart and independent. Around this time, Choi ate a meal with fellow Single's Inferno 3 alumna Yun Ha-jeong, and had a good time chatting in the cafe.

== Philanthropy ==
Choi participated in a children's charity campaign for World Vision International, later lending her support again for the Stop Ring Challenge to raise funds for a village in Zambia. The production company that worked with her to promote that challenge also worked with Kook Dong-ho after his collaboration with Choi for Esquire. In May 2024, she contributed to a Green Allure initiative that planted 4,000 jasmine trees in the Ichon area of Hangang Park.

== Filmography ==
=== Television ===
Year	Title	Role	Notes	Ref.
2023–2024	Single's Inferno	Contestant	Season 3	
2024	Game of Blood	Contestant	Season 3	
2026	Game of Blood	Contestant	Season X	
