= The Zone: Survival Mission =

South Korean variety show

- Promotional poster of S3
- Hangul: 더 존: 버텨야 산다
- Lit.: The Zone: Endure to Live
- RR: Deo jon: beotyeoya sanda
- MR: Tŏ chon: pŏt'yŏya sanda
- Genre: Mystery; Game show Variety show
- Starring: Yoo Jae-suk; Kwon Yuri; Season 1-2: Lee Kwang-soo; Season 3: Kim Dong-hyun; Dex
- Country of origin: South Korea
- Original language: Korean
- No. of seasons: 3
- No. of episodes: 24

Production
- Executive producer: Cho Hyo-jin
- Running time: 54–75 minutes
- Production company: Studio Gaon

Original release
- Network: Disney+
- Release: September 8, 2022 – September 11, 2024

The Zone: Survival Mission (Korean: 더 존: 버텨야 산다) is a South Korean game television series starring Yoo Jae-suk, Lee Kwang-soo, Kwon Yuri, Kim Dong-hyun and Dex. Dubbed as the "agents of mankind", the members are put into eight disaster simulations in which they must survive for four hours. It premiered on Disney+ on September 8, 2022, with the first three episodes being released at the same time.

The series is produced by Cho Hyo-jin, who has frequently collaborated with Yoo Jae-suk and is known for his previous shows such as Running Man, X-Man, Family Outing, and Busted!.

On November 30, 2022, it was confirmed that the second season would be in production. On 14 June 2023, the first three episodes of season 2 premiered on Disney+.

On March 11, 2024, Disney+ revealed that the upcoming third season will feature two new cast members, Kim Dong-hyun and Dex, with Lee Kwang-soo leaving the show. On August 7, 2024, the first three episodes of season 3 were released on Disney+.

== Premise ==
In each episode, the cast is put into survival-themed simulations through "The Zone" with the assistance of AI U (voiced by You Hee-yeol), an artificial intelligence machine. Their task is to complete missions and endure the scenarios in 4 hours. In season 2, AI 2.0 replaced AI U and was voiced by the producer Cho Hyo-jin.

== Episodes ==
=== Series overview ===
Season	Episodes	Originally released	
Season	Episodes	First released	Last released
1	10	September 8, 2022	October 12, 2022
2	10	June 14, 2023	July 19, 2023
3	8	August 7, 2024	September 11, 2024

=== Season 1 (2022) ===
No.	Title	Original release date
1	"Eye Zone"	September 8, 2022
Participants are required to survive for a duration of four hours within the designated zone while successfully avoiding all obstacles, represented as “eyes.” Any contact with these obstacles will result in the participant being sprayed with water. Additionally, this zone features an enhanced difficulty level during the final one minute of the simulation. Zone's objective: This simulation that participants are required to endure is coldness, designed to replicate cold conditions as a representation of the Earth’s environmental distress caused by climate change, with global warming identified as a key contributing factor. Results: Simulation was successfully completed. Yoo Jae-suk and Lee Kwang-soo each received 1 Z coin. Kwon Yu-ri received 2 Z coins.
2	"Water Zone"	September 8, 2022
Participants are required to remain within the designated zone for a total duration of four hours. During this period, members must maintain the pool water level at a fixed threshold. The pool is governed by a countdown timer set at two hours, which will continue to decrease if the required water level is not maintained. Water resources are scattered throughout the designated zone, and members are expected to locate and utilise these to replenish the pool. Successfully maintaining the required water level will pause the countdown timer, while failure to do so will result in the timer continuing to run. Zone's objective: This simulation is designed to emphasise the importance of maintaining balance through the regulation of water levels. It illustrates how imbalance can lead to widespread disruption and potential collapse, while highlighting the critical role of water as an essential resource in sustaining life on Earth. Results: Simulation was successfully completed. Lee Kwang-soo and Kwon Yu-ri each received 2 Z coins. Yoo Jae-suk received 1 Z coin.
3	"Virus Zone"	September 8, 2022
Participants are required to avoid infection by zombies for a continuous duration of four hours. The simulation will terminate immediately if any participant becomes infected. Designated safe zones will be established within the area, preventing zombies from entering. Each safe zone is sustained by four talismans; once all four talismans associated with a safe zone are exhausted, the protection will cease and the zone will no longer be secure. Yoo Jae-suk and Lee Kwang-soo are designated as immune participants within this simulation and are tasked with protecting Kwon Yu-ri from infection. Simulation ends immediately the moment any of the participants is infected. Additionally, this zone features an enhanced difficulty level during the final one minute of the simulation. Zone's objective: This simulation is designed to reflect the prolonged global hardships experienced during the COVID-19 pandemic. It draws parallels between real-world contagious diseases and the portrayal of similar crises in fictional scenarios, where a combination of widespread infection, human fear, and uncertainty is often represented as a zombie apocalypse. Through this framework, the simulation explores how a rapidly spreading, mysterious virus could impact society, examining potential human responses and outcomes under such conditions. Results: Simulation failed as Kwon Yu-ri was infected. No Z coins were awarded.
4	"Safety Zone"	September 14, 2022
Participants are required to endure a duration of four hours by maintaining effective isolation within the designated zone. Participants may accelerate the simulation to twice its normal speed by visiting designated horror-themed rooms. However, strict compliance with the rules is required. Any breach, including exceeding the permitted occupancy limit within a room or remaining in close proximity to another member, will result in a penalty of an additional ten minutes being added to the simulation time for the member(s) involved. Zone's objective: This simulation is designed for a certain situation in the future by learning how to isolate wisely. Results: Kwon Yu-ri successfully completed the simulation. However, the simulation was considered a failure as Yoo Jae-suk and Lee Kwang-soo left the designated zone. No Z coins were awarded.
5	"Brain Zone"	September 21, 2022
Participants are required to remain seated and endure a duration of four hours by refraining from leaving their seats at any point during the simulation. Additionally, the mood of Lee Kwang-soo may influence the progression of the simulation, triggering various scenarios. Each participant will be allocated four lives. A life will be deducted each time a participant leaves their seat. The simulation will terminate immediately once any participant has exhausted all four of his lives. Zone's objective: This simulation is conceptualised as the inner workings of Lee Kwang-soo’s mind, where visual elements dynamically reflect his emotional states. Red flames symbolise curiosity, spinning chairs represent confusion, while blooming flowers and fireworks indicate a lightened mood. A festival setting signifies peak happiness. Through these representations, the simulation illustrates how individuals experience emotions and respond to stress, emphasising that a lack of emotional regulation may have consequences not only on oneself but also on others in the surrounding environment. Results: Simulation failed as Yoo Jae-suk exhausted all his lives. No Z coins were awarded.
6	"Money Zone"	September 28, 2022
Participants are allocated an initial sum of 100 million won and are required to sustain this amount over a duration of four hours without allowing the balance to reach zero. The simulation will terminate immediately if the participants exhaust their funds before the completion of the four-hour period. Within the designated zone, participants may earn additional funds through various means, including competitions and betting activities conducted across several games. However, a fixed deduction of 13.5 million won will be applied at every 30-minute interval throughout the simulation. Zone's objective: This simulation is designed to illustrate the dual nature of money, highlighting its role in enriching lives while also demonstrating its potential to become harmful. Through the inclusion of gambling-based activities, it reflects how such environments can foster addictive behaviours that may lead individuals into cycles of loss and distress. The simulation further emphasises the risks associated with gambling addiction, including its psychological impact and the broader consequences it may have on an individual’s well-being and decision-making. Results: Simulation failed as money ran out before the end of the simulation. No Z coins were awarded.
7	"Fire Zone"	October 5, 2022
Participants are required to keep the flame of a candle continuously lit for a duration of four hours. To sustain the flame, members must locate candle boxes distributed throughout the designated zone, which may contain matchsticks, candles, or both. If the flame is extinguished at any point, participants must relight it within one minute. Failure to do so will result in the immediate termination of the simulation. Zone's objective: This simulation is designed to demonstrate the critical importance of fire as a fundamental element for human survival. Fire has historically enabled the advancement of science, technology, and modern civilisation. Through this simulation, participants gain an understanding of the care, attention, and measures necessary to protect even a small flame, highlighting the broader significance of safeguarding essential resources. Results: Simulation was successfully completed. Yoo Jae-suk, Lee Kwang-soo and Kwon Yu-ri each received 1 Z coin.
8	"Target Zone"	October 12, 2022
Participants are required to survive and eliminate enemies for a duration of four hours. To do so, they must locate loot boxes scattered throughout the battle zone, which may contain weapons, ammunition, or supplies, and eliminate enemies by striking the target boards worn by each opponent. Yoo Jae-suk, Lee Kwang-soo, and Kwon Yu-ri play as a team for this mission, while the 6 remaining hunters plays individually. The simulation will conclude when all three team members are eliminated or when they remain as the last participants standing. Previously collected Z coins are used during this mission, with each Z coin granting a 10-minute delayed entry into the battle zone. Zone's objective: This simulation is designed to simulate what would happen during a war. Results: Simulation was successfully completed. Yoo Jae-suk, Lee Kwang-soo and Kwon Yu-ri each received a gold Z coin imprinted with the names of all 8 zones.

=== Season 2 (2023) ===
No.	Title	Original release date
1	"Stress Zone"	June 14, 2023
Participants underwent a fake health screening to estimate their expected life expectancy. Following this, they are required to sustain their life expectancy over a duration of four hours, ensuring it does not fall to zero. Exposure to stress during the simulation will reduce life expectancy according to intensity: low stress decreases it by 1 year, medium stress by 2 years, and high stress by 3 years. Life expectancy boosters are distributed throughout the zone. Participants may increase their life expectancy by one year each time they fill their allocated cup with water and consume it. The simulation will terminate immediately if any participant’s life expectancy reaches zero. Zone's objective: This simulation is designed to raise awareness of stress, a factor widely recognised as a contributor to numerous health issues. Although often imperceptible, stress can exert a significant impact on the body. Through this exercise, participants are challenged to manage both mind and body effectively when confronted with unavoidable stressors, highlighting the importance of coping strategies and resilience in maintaining overall well-being. Results: Simulation failed as Lee Kwang-soo ran out of life expectancy. No Z coins were awarded.
2	"Save Zone"	June 14, 2023
Participants are placed on a secluded island where the land gradually disappears after an unspecified period. They are required to survive for a duration of four hours while navigating a makeshift golf course comprising nine holes. Completing each hole within the allotted number of strokes will reduce the remaining time participants are required to hold out. A designated relaxation and recharge zone is available within the island. Food items obtained or purchased in this zone will increase the participants’ required holdout time proportionally. Zone's objective: This simulation is designed to raise awareness of the projected rise in sea levels due to global warming, illustrating how many popular vacation destinations, and eventually, everyday living areas, may become submerged, posing a threat to daily life. Accordingly, the simulation emphasises the importance of collective environmental protection, encouraging participants to take actions that help preserve and safeguard these places for the future. Results: Simulation failed as all 3 members opted to give up, the first consensus in both seasons combined. No Z coins were awarded.
3	"Automatic Zone"	June 14, 2023
Participants are required to remain on a bed, designed as AI Minimi, for a continuous duration of four hours. The simulation will terminate immediately if any participant leaves the bed before the completion of the four-hour period. During the simulation, short bursts of uncontrollable AI Minimi activity will occur, increasing the level of difficulty and introducing additional obstacles for the participants to manage. Zone's objective: This simulation is designed to demonstrate the capabilities of advanced technology, where everyday tasks can be controlled effortlessly with a word or a button, thereby facilitating daily life. It also highlights the potential challenges posed by uncontrollable or malfunctioning AI. The simulation presents an extreme scenario in which AI systems fail to operate correctly, emphasising the importance of research and safeguards to prevent such situations and ensure reliable integration of technology into daily life. Results: Simulation was successfully completed. In this season, Z coins are awarded to the team instead of individually, with 2 Z coins granted for the successful completion of this zone.
4	"Virus Zone II"	June 21, 2023
Participants are placed inside a zombie-themed waterpark, which initially contains a single zombie. They are required to survive for a duration of four hours while avoiding infection from the zombies. Water guns are distributed throughout the waterpark and are essential for temporarily neutralising zombies by targeting their octagonal markers. Successfully neutralising a specified number of zombies will reduce the remaining holdout time; however, once the neutralised time expires, an additional zombie will be introduced into the zone. Designated safety zones are available within the park and are accessible for 10 minutes at the start of every hour. As the simulation progresses, zombies will gradually become stronger or more advanced (i.e., immune to water, smaller targets), increasing the challenge as the remaining holdout time decreases. Kwon Yu-ri’s left arm is immune to zombie infection due to a prior infection sustained in Season 1’s Virus zone. The simulation will end immediately if all three participants are infected before the four-hour duration is completed. Zone's objective: This simulation is designed to illustrate the historical and ongoing presence of viruses throughout human history, highlighting how they continue to proliferate in various forms despite efforts to control them. As viruses cannot be completely eradicated, the simulation challenges participants to remain vigilant and endure until the end of a hypothetical war against viruses that continue to spread indefinitely. It emphasises the importance of alertness, resilience, and sustained defensive measures in the face of persistent biological threats. Results: Simulation failed as all 3 members were infected. No Z coins were awarded.
5	"Mystery Zone"	June 28, 2023
Participants are transported back to the Joseon era, where at the start of the simulation, only Lee Kwang-soo’s timer does not begin counting down. Participants are required to investigate and solve the mystery surrounding the village, locate Lee Kwang-soo’s missing shoe to activate his timer, and hold out for four hours until the arrival of the secret royal inspector. Lee Kwang-soo possesses invincibility, allowing him to move freely throughout the village until he locates his shoes by solving the mystery. The simulation will end immediately if Lee Kwang-soo loses his shoe before the conclusion of the four-hour period. Zone's objective: This simulation is designed to illustrate the abundance of mystery encountered in daily life, where uncommon and seemingly absurd events frequently occur, and individuals must navigate incomprehensible situations. Through a combination of recurring comedic and tragic scenarios, the simulation challenges participants to develop strategies for understanding, managing, and ultimately overcoming the hidden mysteries that arise in everyday life. Results: Simulation was successfully completed. 2 Z coins were granted.
6	"Team Play Zone"	July 5, 2023
Participants engage in a game on an 88-space board, where progress is determined by playing a game of ddakji. Successfully flipping the ddakji at each space allows participants to advance; failure to do so requires moving back one space per unsuccessful attempt. A backpack containing additional games is available, enabling participants to attempt alternative challenges that may allow them to advance multiple spaces. However, these carry an increased risk of moving backwards multiple spaces if unsuccessful. Booster zones featuring different games are randomly distributed across the board, providing similar advantages and risks. Rest zones are also present on the game board, but one rest zone closes each hour. Failure to reach a rest zone before its closure prevents participants from taking a break. The simulation concludes successfully when participants reach the 88th space within the four-hour duration. Zone's objective: This simulation is designed to illustrate how daily life functions smoothly when each individual fulfils their responsibilities faithfully. It also demonstrates that if even a single person fails to uphold their duties, it can trigger a chain reaction, causing systems or processes to collapse, much like a row of dominoes falling in sequence. Results: Simulation was successfully completed. 3 Z coins were granted.
7	"Analog Zone"	July 12, 2023
This simulation begins with each participant starting in a separate bunker, isolated from one another and cut off from all external technologies. Within each bunker, answers to a quiz are scattered throughout the space. At fixed intervals, participants are randomly selected by Ham-man to answer the quiz. Participants must correctly solve the quizzes in order to unlock the trap doors separating the bunkers, progressing layer by layer until all participants can access each other. The simulation must be completed within a four-hour duration. Zone's objective: This simulation is designed to demonstrate the critical role of communication services in daily life, highlighting how they enhance efficiency and overall quality of life. It also illustrates that if such systems were to fail, even temporarily, ordinary routines could be disrupted immediately. The simulation challenges participants to adapt and sustain themselves in the event of a sudden communications blackout, testing resilience and problem-solving under these conditions. Results: Simulation failed as the time ran out before the doors were unlocked. No Z coins were awarded.
8	"Battle Zone"	July 19, 2023
Participants are organised into Team The Zone, competing against Team Foreign Legion and Team Invincible. Each team is assigned three zones, which they must target by placing a bomb on the opposing team's zone and pressing the button to initiate a one-minute countdown to detonation. Defending teams can reset the countdown by pressing the button of any zone under attack. Successfully detonating all three zones of a team will reveal that team’s final zones, which must also be destroyed to fully eliminate the team from the game. Participants are not eliminated when struck by opposing teams’ attacks. However, a Z coin is awarded for every successful shot. Team The Zone has accumulated 7 Z coins throughout this season. The remaining 14 Z coins, which were not obtained due to failed simulations, are evenly distributed to the other two teams. Z coins may be used to purchase additional weapons and hire mercenaries. The simulation requires Team The Zone to hold out and survive as the last team standing within a four-hour duration. Zone's objective: This simulation is designed to simulate what would happen during a war. Results: Simulation failed, Team Foreign Legion emerges as the winner of this zone.

=== Season 3 (2024) ===
No.	Title	Original release date
1	"AI Zone"	August 7, 2024
2	"Break Zone"	August 7, 2024
3	"Fact Check Zone"	August 7, 2024
4	"Bug Zone"	August 14, 2024
5	"Four Minutes Zone"	August 21, 2024
6	"Line Zone"	August 28, 2024
7	"Memorize Zone / Hunter Zone"	September 4, 2024
8	"Hunter Zone"	September 11, 2024
