= 2023 MBC Entertainment Awards =

23rd edition of award ceremony

- Awarded for: Excellence in variety entertainment
- Date: December 29, 2023
- Venue: MBC Public Hall, Sangam-dong, Mapo-gu, Seoul
- Country: South Korea
- Presented by: MBC
- Hosted by: Jun Hyun-moo; Lee Se-young; Dex
- First award: 1990

Highlights
- Grand Prize (Daesang): Kian84
- Website: https://program.imbc.com/2023ent

Television/radio coverage
- Network: MBC TV
- Viewership: Ratings: 6.4% (part 1); Viewership: 1,272,000 (part 1); Ratings: 8.9% (part 2); Viewership: 1,715,000 (part 2)

The 2023 MBC Entertainment Awards presented by Munhwa Broadcasting Corporation (MBC), took place on December 29, 2023, at MBC Public Hall in Sangam-dong, Mapo-gu, Seoul. The award ceremony was hosted by Jun Hyun-moo, Dex and Lee Se-young.

== Winners ==
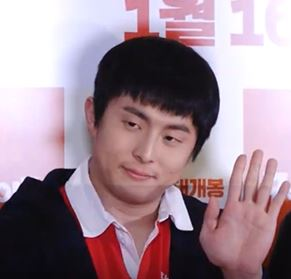
Kian84, winner of Grand Prize (Daesang)

(Winners denoted in bold)

== See also ==
- 2023 KBS Entertainment Awards
- 2023 SBS Entertainment Awards
