= The Defects (TV series) =

2025 South Korean television series

- Promotional poster
- Hangul: 아이쇼핑
- Lit.: Eyeshopping
- RR: Aisyoping
- MR: Aisyop'ing
- Genre: Action; Thriller; Revenge drama
- Based on: Child Shopping by: Um Se-yoon; Ryu Ga-myeong
- Written by: An So-jung
- Directed by: Oh Ki-hwan
- Starring: Yum Jung-ah; Won Jin-ah; Choi Young-joon; Kim Jin-young
- Music by: Lee Ji-soo; Shin Do-hwi; Seo Ga-nui
- Country of origin: South Korea
- Original language: Korean
- No. of episodes: 8

Production
- Running time: 60 minutes
- Production companies: Group 8; Takeone Studio

Original release
- Network: ENA
- Release: July 21 – August 12, 2025

The Defects (Korean: 아이쇼핑; lit. 'Eyeshopping') is a 2025 South Korean television series and starring Yum Jung-ah, Won Jin-a, Choi Young-joon, and Kim Jin-young. It aired on ENA from July 21, to August 12, 2025, and subsequently streaming on Genie TV every Monday and Tuesday at 22:00 (KST).

== Synopsis ==
The Defects is an action thriller depicting the desperate survival and revenge of children who barely survived on the brink of death after being abandoned by their adoptive parents.

== Cast ==
=== Main ===
- Yum Jung-ah as Kim Se-hee

CEO of SH Medical Foundation and President of the Illegal Adoption Organization.

- Won Jin-ah as Kim Ah-hyeon

Leader and spiritual leader of Child Survivors.

- Choi Young-joon as Woo Tae-sik

A worker who disposes of abandoned adopted children. He later becomes their savior.

- Kim Jin-young as Jung-hyeon

A member of the organization, and a loyal subordinate of President Kim.

=== Supporting ===
- Lee Na-eun as So-mi

She is one of the children abandoned by her adoptive parents. Despite her painful past, she lives with enthusiasm alongside other children, including Ah-hyeon.

- Oh Seung-jun as Seok-soo

One of the surviving children, he is Ah-hyeon's loyal supporter.

- Ahn Ji-ho as Joo-an

One of the surviving children.

==== Others ====
- Song Young-kyu as Yoon Se-hoon
- Kim Jian as Kim Ah-hyun

With her stunning looks and brilliant intelligence, everything about her resembles Se-hee.

- Son Jong-hak as Kwon Kang-man

Seok-soo's father. A prominent candidate for the next presidential election and leader of the ruling party. He has strong support from Se-hee.

== Production ==
The series is written by An So-jung. It is directed by Oh Ki-hwan, whose work includes SF8 (2020), and How to Be Thirty (2022), and produced by Group 8 and Takeone Studio.

== Viewership ==
The Defetcs : South Korea viewers per episode (thousands)

Season	Episode number								Average
Season	1	2	3	4	5	6	7	8	Average
1	392	471	493	491	469	472	477	515	473

Source: Audience measurement performed nationwide by Nielsen Korea.

Average TV viewership ratings
Ep.	Original broadcast date	Average audience share	
Ep.	Original broadcast date	(Nielsen Korea)	
Ep.	Original broadcast date	Nationwide	Seoul
1	July 21, 2025	1.747% (2nd)	1.963% (2nd)
2	July 22, 2025	2.063% (3rd)	2.036% (2nd)
3	July 28, 2025	2.264% (2nd)	2.670% (2nd)
4	July 29, 2025	2.199% (2nd)	2.310% (3rd)
5	August 4, 2025	2.094% (2nd)	2.128% (2nd)
6	August 5, 2025	2.175% (3rd)	1.975% (3rd)
7	August 11, 2025	2.028% (2nd)	1.815% (2nd)
8	August 12, 2025	2.312% (2nd)	2.255% (2nd)
Average		2.110%	2.144%
In the table above, the blue numbers represent the lowest ratings and the red numbers represent the highest ratings.; This drama aired on a cable channel/pay TV which normally has a relatively smaller audience compared to free-to-air TV/public broadcasters (KBS, SBS, MBC, and EBS).
