= Dex (entertainer) =

South Korean entertainer (born 1995)

- 덱스
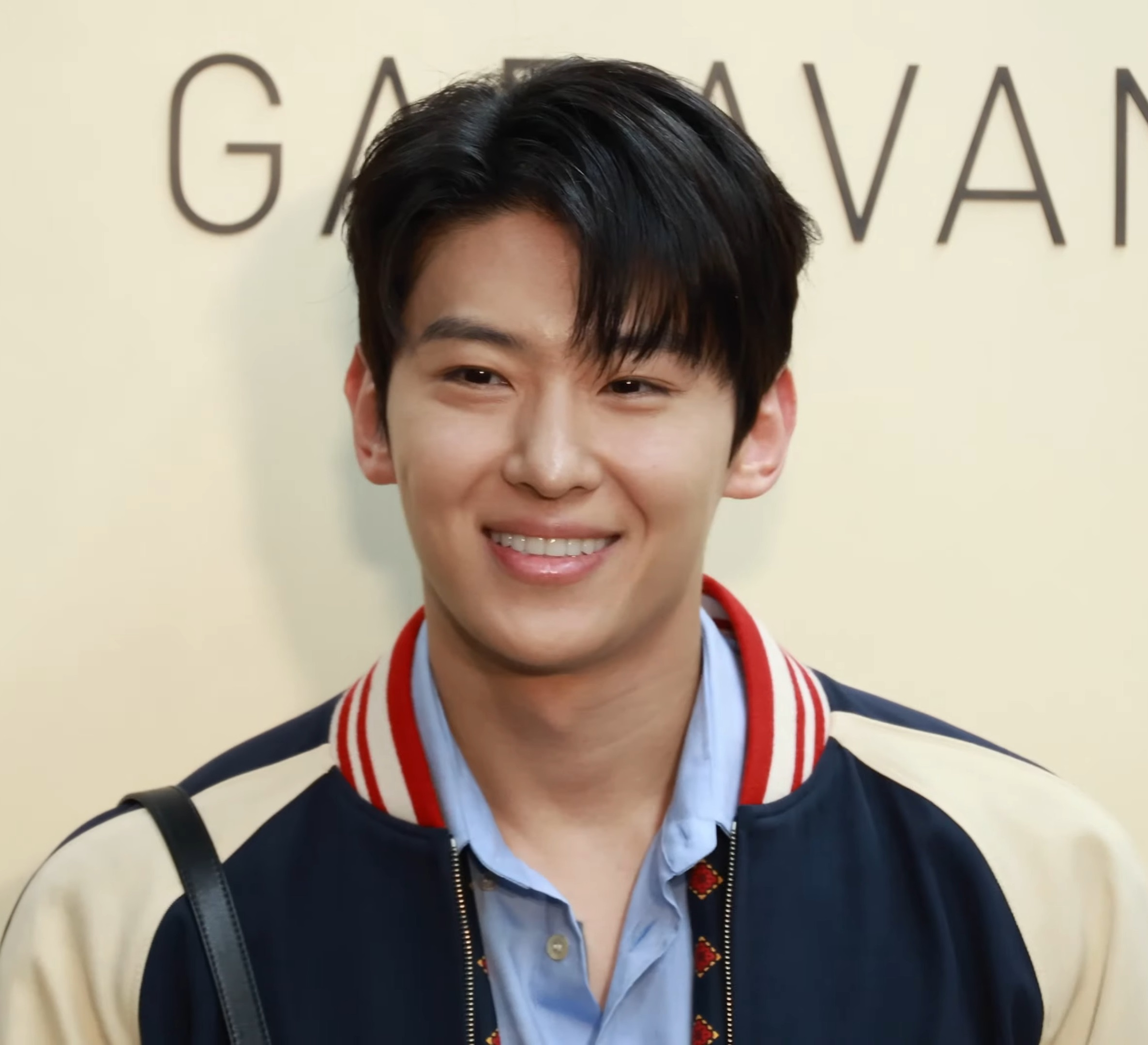
- Dex in June 2025
- Born: Kim Jin-young; June 9, 1995 (age 31); Suncheon, South Korea
- Occupations: Entertainer; actor; YouTuber
- Years active: 2020–present
- Agent: Kick The Hurdle Studio
- Military career
- Allegiance: South Korea
- Branch: Republic of Korea Armed Forces
- Service years: 2016–2020
- Unit: Navy Special Warfare Flotilla (UDT/SEALs)

YouTube information
- Channel: DEX101
- Genres: Vlog; Travel
- Subscribers: 1.16 million
- Views: 165.6 million
- Last updated: August 6, 2026

Kim Jin-young (Korean: 김진영; born June 9, 1995), also known as Dex (Korean: 덱스), is a South Korean entertainer, actor, YouTuber and former ROKN UDT soldier. He is best known for appearing in Toy Soldiers: Fake Men 2 (2020), Single's Inferno Season 2 (2022–2023), Bloody Game 2 (2023), Adventure by Accident (2023–2025), Zombieverse (2023–2024), and Fresh off the Sea (2024).

== Career ==
=== 2016–2020: Military service ===
In 2016, Dex entered the military as a non-commissioned officer in the 251st Class, Republic of Korea Navy and part of ROKN UDT (South Korean counterpart of the U.S Navy Seal), Class 62-2. He served for 4 years. During his active duty, he was assigned in the Special Mission Battalion of the Naval Special Warfare Flotilla, a counter-terrorism unit. In 2018, he was also assigned to the 13th Akh Unit, a dispatched unit of the Republic of Korea Armed Forces to the United Arab Emirates.

After being discharged from the military in 2020, he appeared in Fake Men 2, a military web entertainment show. In the same year, he appeared in MBC's game survival show Bloody Game.

=== 2022–2023: Rising popularity ===
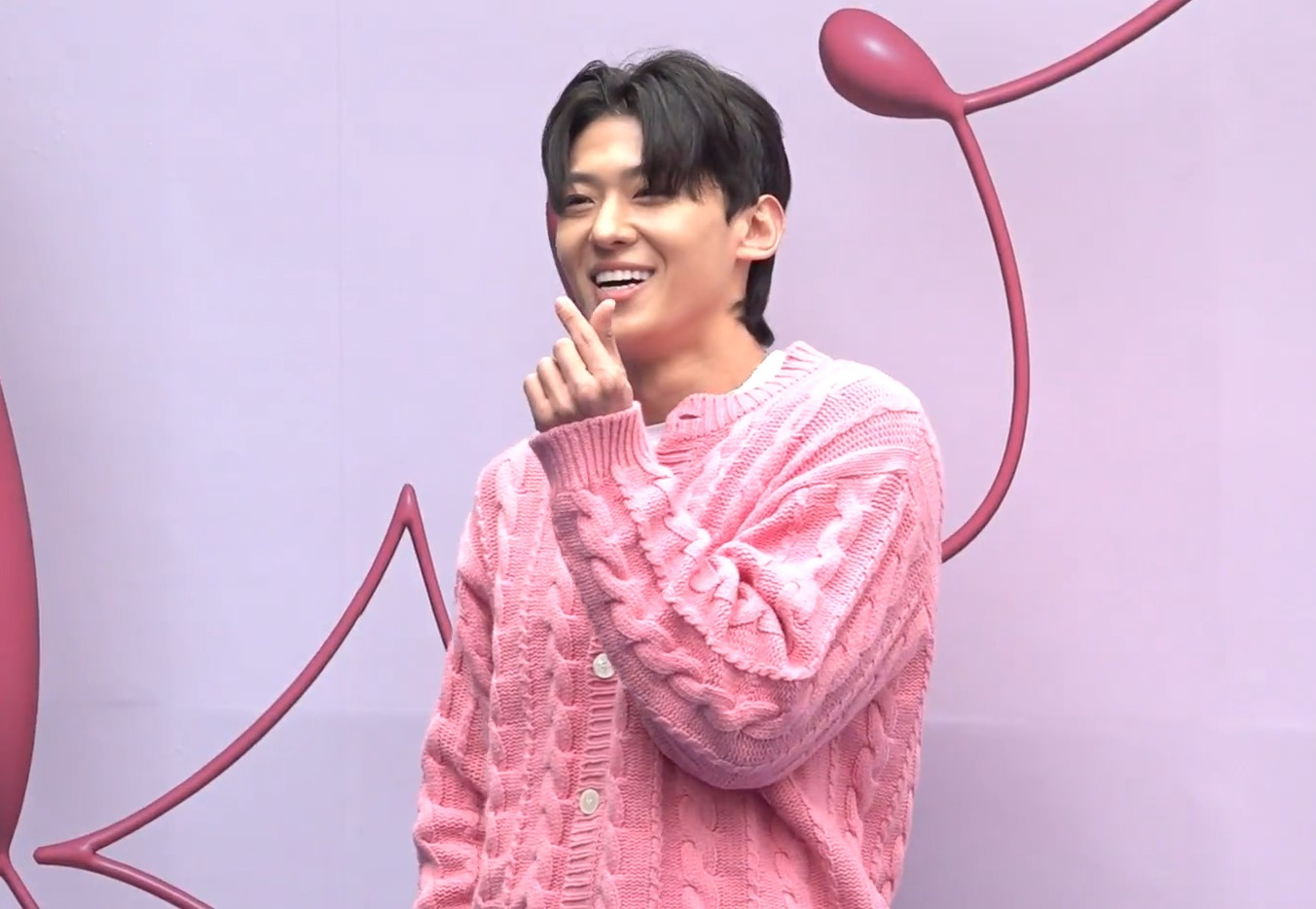
Dex at the 2023 FW Seoul Fashion Week on March 15, 2023

In 2022, Dex rose to fame when he participated in the second season of the Netflix dating show Single's Inferno. He was known as the "Catfish Man" (Korean: 메기남), who was brought in later to make the existing cast members stay together first and make the contestants nervous. Dex returned to Single's Inferno as a panelist for season three.

In 2023, he returned as a participant in the second season of Bloody Game for which he won the Rookie Male Entertainer Award at the 2nd Blue Dragon Series Awards. He joined the second and third seasons of the travel variety show Adventure by Accident as a regular member with Kian84, Pani Bottle, and Lee Si-eon. The show won several awards at the 2023 MBC Entertainment Awards, and Dex received the Rookie Award and the Best Couple Award.

Dex is also the sole host for the YouTube show Dex's Fridge Interview by Channel 117. He hosted the 2023 MBC Entertainment Awards with Jun Hyun-moo and Lee Se-young, and also joined the third, fourth, and fifth seasons of Single's Inferno as a panel member.

=== 2024–present: Acting and motorcycle racing debut ===
Dex appeared in several variety shows in 2024, such as MBC's University Sports Festival: Boys' Athletes' Village, where he served as a coach to college sports athletes; Disney+'s The Zone: Survival Mission 3 with Yoo Jae-suk, SNSD's Kwon Yu-ri, and Dong Hyun Kim; and JTBC's My Name is Gabriel, where he experienced the life of Rati, a wine jar maker, for 72 hours. He also showed sibling-like chemistry on tvN's Fresh off the Sea with Yum Jung-ah, Park Jun-myun, and Ahn Eun-jin. The show became a trending topic every week of its broadcast and Dex was dubbed as the "Nation's Younger Brother".

Dex debuted as an actor in the third episode of Tarot: The Seven Chapter Story, a horror-thriller drama series. He used his real name, Kim Jin-young, as an actor, instead of his stage name, Dex, wanting to separate entertainment and acting. He then appeared in the second season of Netflix's Zombieverse, which premiered on November 19, 2024.

In 2025, Dex appeared in the action thriller The Defects as a main villain, and filmed special appeances for Bloodhounds: Season 2. On September 5, 2025, it was confirmed that Dex will play the lead role in the upcoming fantasy romance The Haunted House, a Korea-Japan joint global film project. The film is based on the short-story House of Ghosts from the book Dead-End Memories by the renowned Japanese author Banana Yoshimoto.

== Impact ==
On December 2, 2023, Dex was placed first on the Wavve Year-end Settlement as the "contributor that attracted new paid subscriptions" for the platform. On December 7, he became part of the "fastest growing creator" by YouTube Korea.

== Filmography ==
=== Films ===
Year	Title	Role	Notes	Ref.
2024	Tarot	Yoon Dong-in	Movie version	
2026	The Haunted House	Yoon-seong		

=== Television series ===
Year	Title	Role	Notes	Ref.
2024	Tarot	Yoon Dong-in		
2025	The Defects	Jeong-hyun		
2026	Bloodhounds	Han Seul-gi	Season 2; Special appearance	

=== Television shows ===
Year	Title	Role	Ref.
2020	Toy Soldiers: Fake Men 2	Instructor	
2021–2022	Bloody Game	Contestant	
2022–2023	Single's Inferno Season 2	Contestant	
2023	Bloody Game 2	Contestant	
2023	Masked Singer	Contestant	
2023	Adventure by Accident 2	Cast member	
2023	Smiling Boss	Cast member	
2023	Radio Star	Special MC	
2023	Zombieverse	Cast member	
2023	I am Angry Now	MC	
2023	Muksuldan	MC	
2023–2024	Adventure by Accident 3	Cast member	
2023–2024	Single's Inferno Season 3	MC	
2024	University Sports Festival: Boys' Athletes' Village	Coach	
2024	Fresh off the Sea	Cast member	
2024	The Zone: Survival Mission 3	Cast member	
2024	My Name is Gabriel	Cast member	
2024	Zombieverse 2	Cast member	
2025	Single's Inferno Season 4	MC	
2025	Adventure by Accident 4	Cast member	
2025	Be My Boyz	MC	
2025–2026	I Am Boxer	MC	
2026	Single's Inferno Season 5	MC	
2026	The Secret Friends Club	Cast member	
2026	Fresh off the Sea in Calape	Cast member	
2026	Kian's Bizarre B&B Season 2	Cast Member	

=== Web shows ===
Year	Title	Role	Ref.
2023	Matcaron	MC	
2023–2025	Dex's Fridge Interview	MC	

== Accolades ==
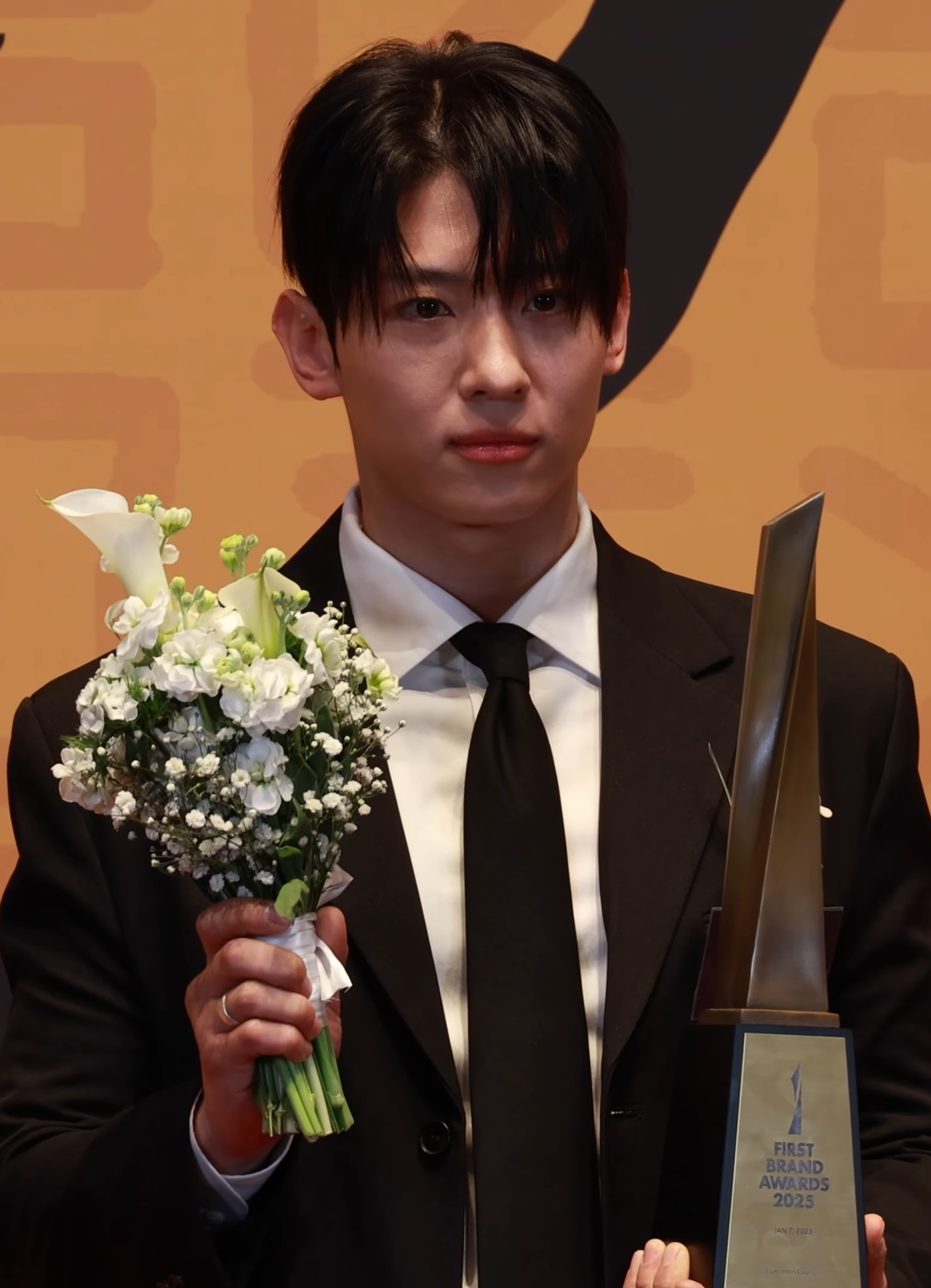
Dex at First Brand Awards on January 7, 2025

=== Awards and nominations ===
Name of the award ceremony, year presented, category, nominee of the award, and the result of the nomination
Award ceremony	Year	Category	Nominee / Work	Result	Ref.
Brand Customer Loyalty Awards	2026	Entertainer (Male)	Dex	Won	
Baeksang Arts Awards	2025	Best Male Variety Performer	Dex	Nominated	
Blue Dragon Series Awards	2023	Best New Male Entertainer	Bloody Game 2	Won	
Blue Dragon Series Awards	2024	TIRTIR Popular Star Award	Dex	Won	
Donga.com's Pick	2023	I can survive without Dex	Dex	Won	
Fundex Awards	2023	Best OTT Non-Drama Performer	Dex	Won	
Korea Culture and Entertainment Awards	2023	Entertainment Star Award	Dex	Won	
Korea First Brand Awards	2024	Multitainer (Male)	Dex	Won	
Korea First Brand Awards	2025	Multitainer (Male)	Dex	Won	
Korea First Brand Awards	2026	Actor – Rookie	Dex	Won	
MBC Entertainment Awards	2023	Male Rookie Award – Variety	Adventure by Accident 2	Won	
MBC Entertainment Awards	2023	Best Couple Award	Dex (with Kian84 and Pani Bottle); Adventure by Accident 2	Won	
MBC Entertainment Awards	2025	Excellence Award (Male)	Adventure by Accident 4	Won	
MBC Entertainment Awards	2025	Best Couple Award	Dex (with Kian84, Lee Sieon and Pani Bottle); Adventure by Accident 4	Nominated	
Youth Day Creator Awards	2023	Young Creator Award	Dex	Won	

=== State and cultural honors ===
Name of country or organization, name of award ceremony, year given, and name of honor
Country or organization	Ceremony	Year	Honor	Ref.
South Korea	Korean Youth Hope Awards	2023	National Assembly Culture, Sports and Tourism Committee's Commendation	

=== Listicles ===
Name of publisher, year listed, name of listicle, and placement
Publisher	Year	Listicle	Placement	Ref.
Forbes	2024	Korea Power Celebrity 40	14th	
