= Yu Si-eun =

South Korean model (born 1998)

Yu Si-Eun
- Born: South Korea
- Occupation: Model
- Years active: 2022–present

Korean name
- Hangul: 유시은
- RR: Yu Sieun
- MR: Yu Siŭn

Yu Si-eun (Korean: 유시은; born 1998) is a South Korean model. She was runner up for Miss Korea in 2022, and gained further attention through her appearance in the series Single's Inferno Season 3 (2023–2024) when she was 27. She started the show with 73,000 Instagram followers, highest of any cast member. She and her fellow Miss Korea competitors were later widely credited with bringing glamour and narrative drive to the Single's Inferno programs.

Yu and the rest of the Single's Inferno 3 cast modeled for Dazed as the show was airing, and she reunited with fellow participant Choi Hye-seon to model for Alice + Olivia after the show's finale. She was later seen with several castmates at the 2024 Korean Basketball League All-Star Game.

Yu revealed she was in a relationship with a Single's Inferno 3 castmate in 2026, three years after their season. She later returned to the Miss Korea pageant as a judge.

== Filmography ==
=== Television ===
Year	Title	Role	Notes	Ref.
2023–2024	Single's Inferno	Contestant	Season 3	
