= Kim Seon-tae =

South Korean YouTuber (born 1987)

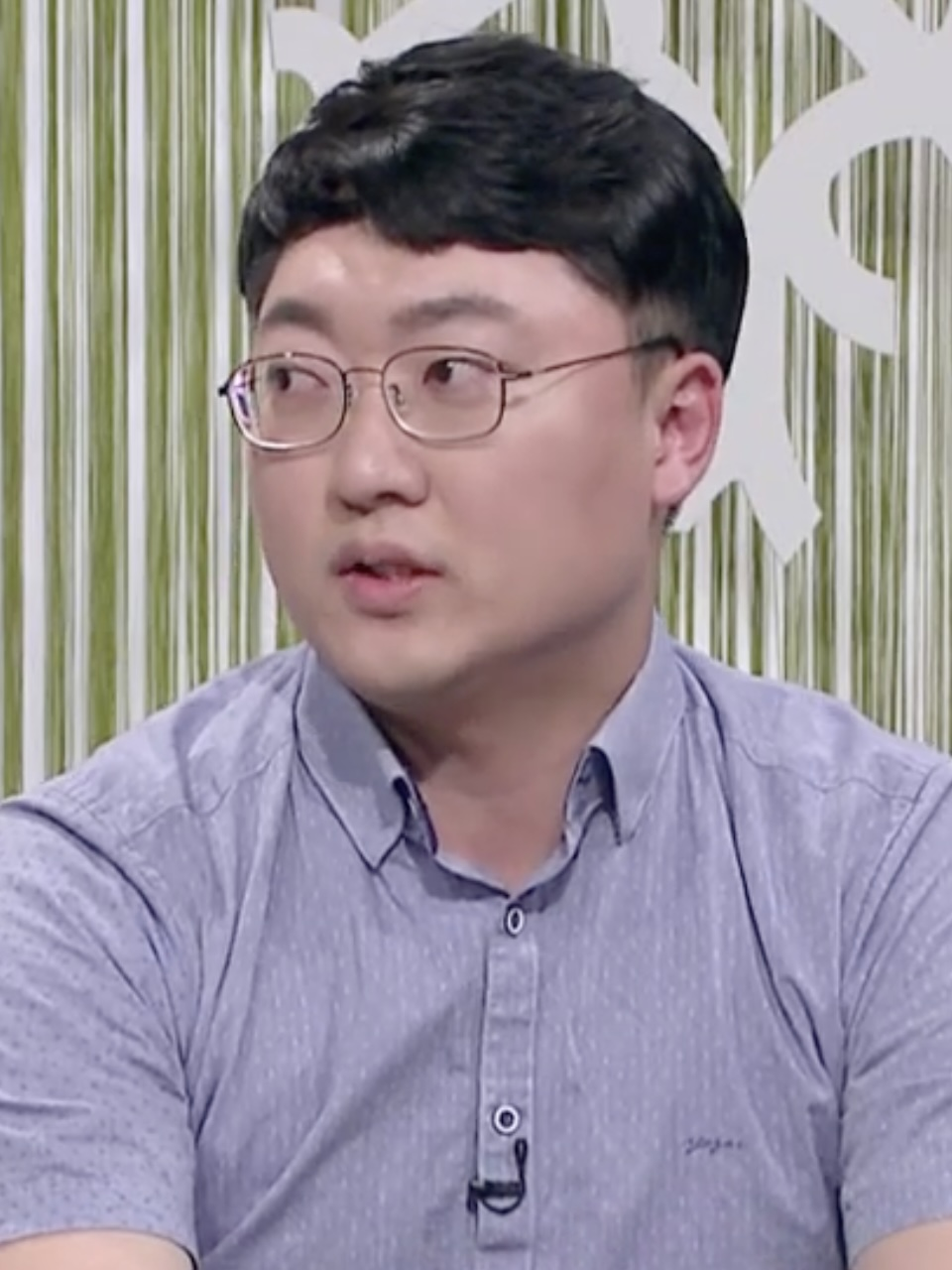
- Kim in 2019
- Born: March 12, 1987 (age 39); Chungju, South Korea
- Occupation: YouTuber

YouTube information
- Channel: kimseontae
- Subscribers: 1.69 million
- Views: 93 million

Korean name
- Hangul: 김선태
- RR: Gim Seontae
- MR: Kim Sŏnt'ae
- Last updated: July 2026

Kim Seon-tae (Korean: 김선태; born March 12, 1987) is a South Korean former civil servant and YouTuber. He was popularly known as Chungju Man (충주맨), as he ran the official YouTube channel of the city of Chungju. He oversaw a massive growth in the channel's popularity; at its peak, the channel had around 975,000 subscribers. In February 2026, he resigned from his post in the government and has been operating his own YouTube channel under his name. As of July 2026, his channel has 1.69 million subscribers.

== Early life and education ==
Kim was born on March 12, 1987 in Chungju, North Chungcheong Province, South Korea. He graduated from Chungju High School and attended Ajou University before dropping out. He studied for the bar exam for six years.

== Career ==
Kim began working for the city government of Chungju in 2016. He began running the city's YouTube channel in 2019. According to Kim, Chungju originally pushed him to upload content that he considered boring, including interviews with high-level government officials. Rather than follow instructions, he selectively uploaded videos that he thought were funny or entertaining. His sense of humor has been described as self-deprecating. The channel became the most popular of those of all local governments and caused local governments around the country to change their social media strategies. His work on the channel caused him to be promoted several times, and he received personal praise from the president of South Korea, Yoon Suk Yeol. In 2024, he published God of Promotion (홍보의 신), a book on his promotion philosophy and strategy.

Kim resigned from his post in the government on February 13, 2026. At the time of his departure, the Chungju YouTube channel had around 975,000 subscribers; far more than the Seoul government's count of 292,000 and multiple times the population of Chungju. After he announced his departure, the Chungju channel's subscriber count dropped to 775,000. Kim then began his own personal YouTube channel under his own name. Within three days, the channel received one million subscribers. He has collaborated with corporations such as Woori Bank. He was announced as the host of the web variety show Money Seontae: The Age of Success (돈선태 성공시대) in July, but stepped down from the show after a preview video sparked controversy for bringing up a cast member's past controversy and using the names of unrelated individuals as hashtags.

== Philanthropy ==
In 2026, Kim donated 10 million KRW to descendents of Korean independence activists.

== Personal life ==
Kim has two sons.

== Book ==
- God of Promotion (ISBN 9791171174331)

== Filmography ==
| Year | Title | Role | Ref. |
|---|---|---|---|
| 2024 | Game of Blood Season 3 | Contestant | |
