= Hannah Bahng =

Australian musician (born 2004)

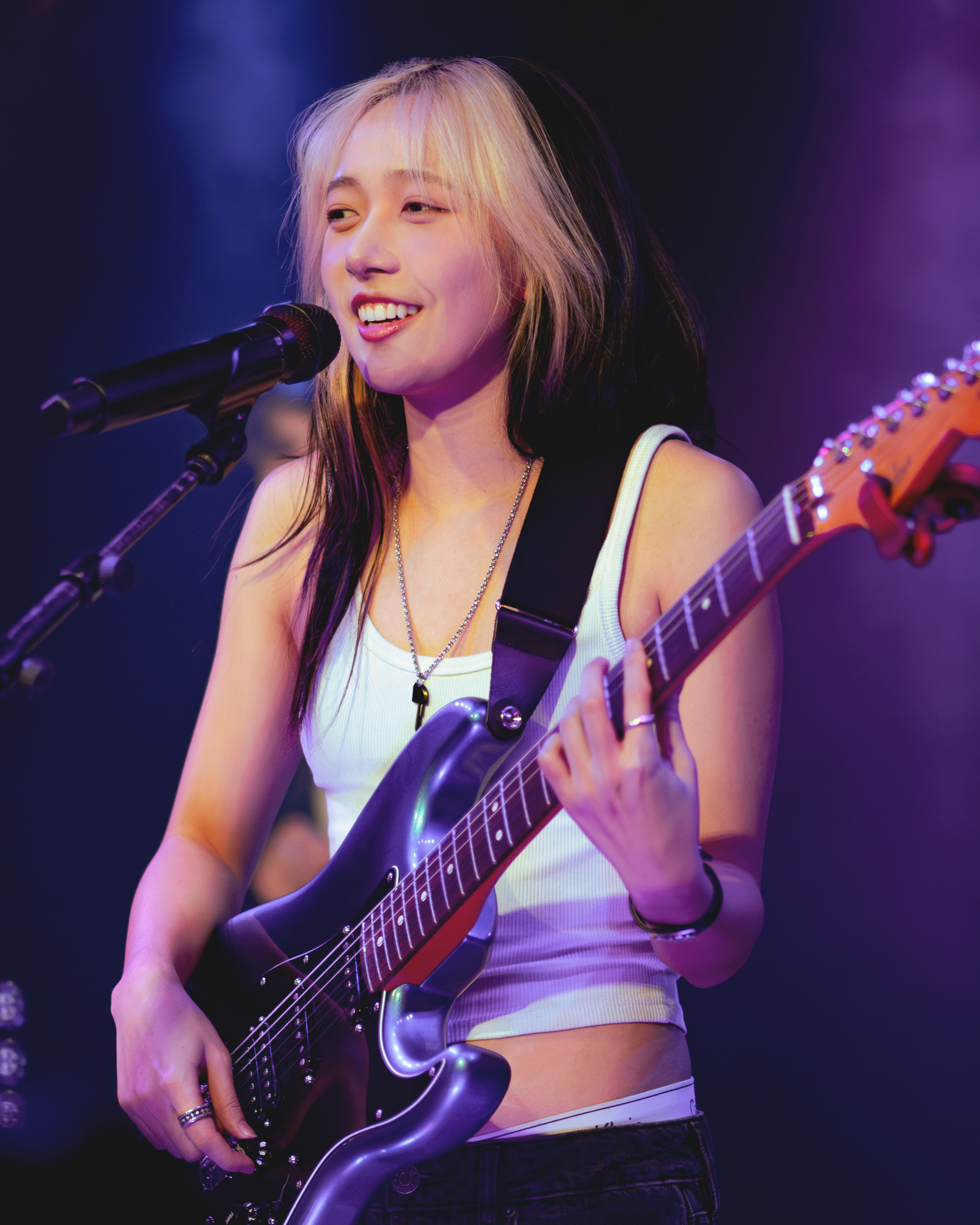
- Bahng performing in 2024

Background information
- Born: 9 February 2004 (age 22); Sydney, Australia
- Genres: Indie pop; alternative R&B
- Occupations: Singer; songwriter
- Instruments: Vocals; guitar; keyboards
- Years active: 2023–present
- Label: Bahng Entertainment
- Relatives: Bang Chan (older brother)
- , Jessica Bahng (mother), Jack Bahng (father), Lucas Bahng (younger brother)

Hannah Bahng is an Australian singer-songwriter. She began her career in 2021 by posting vlogs and cover songs on social media, following an initial attempt to train as a K-pop idol prior to the COVID-19 pandemic in Australia. In 2022, she established her own independent label, Bahng Entertainment, and released her debut single, "Perfect Blues", in 2023. The next year, she released her debut extended play (EP), The Abysmal EP, and went on her first concert tour in the United States. She released her second EP, The Misunderstood EP, in 2025 and went on a world tour. Her fans are called Blues, a name taken from her debut single.

== Early life ==
Hannah Bahng was born on 9 February 2004 in Sydney, Australia, to South Korean immigrant parents who had moved to Australia seeking better opportunities. Her mother encouraged her to pursue art, piano, and dance lessons, later crediting this encouragement with fostering her love of singing and performing.

According to Teen Vogue, Bahng was exposed to the music played by her parents, which included pop, trot, and K-pop. She played the flute and piano in primary school. In high school, she developed a stronger interest in the instrument while pursuing singing and also learned to play guitar. While in Year 7, she became interested in K-pop and spent the next five years pursuing an idol career, taking dance and vocal lessons, filming audition tapes, auditioning twice for Newtown High School of the Performing Arts, and auditioning three times for JYP Entertainment, without success. During the COVID-19 pandemic in Australia, she shifted her focus toward building a presence on social media, teaching herself video production and editing before launching her YouTube channel in September 2021. While creating content for the platform, she began developing her own music and later established Bahng Entertainment with her manager.

== Personal life ==
Hannah Bahng currently resides in Los Angeles, California, although she has stated that she returns to Sydney, Australia, to visit family and friends. She has publicly discussed her close relationships with her parents, Jessica and Jack Bahng. Her older brother, Christopher Bahng, is a member of the hit K-pop group Stray Kids, while her younger brother, Lucas Bahng, has largely remained outside of the public spotlight. As the younger sister of Bang Chan, Hannah has stated that she seeks to be recognized for her own work as a musician and songwriter rather than solely through her familial connections, while maintaining a close relationship with her family. Bahng owns a Cavalier King Charles Spaniel named Berry, which frequently appears in her social media content. In her free time, she has described interests in ballet, contemporary dance, visual art, and digital illustration

== Career ==
=== 2021–2025: Career beginnings and musical debut ===
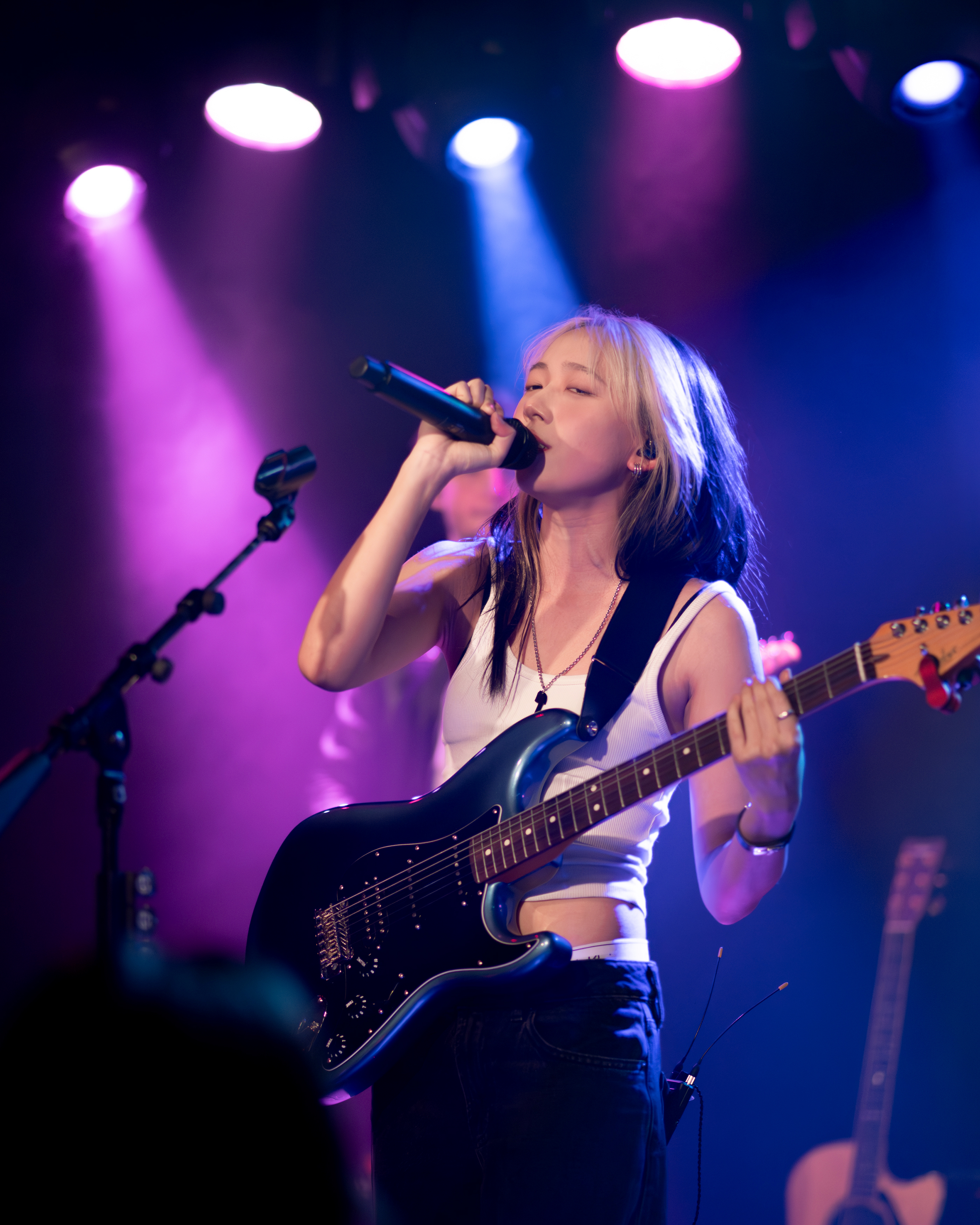
Bahng performing in Los Angeles, 2024.

In 2021, Bahng launched her YouTube channel, releasing covers and other videos with the aim of building a personal brand and eventually releasing original music. During this period she received an email from her future manager, who had discovered her music via TikTok, but because of the pandemic and the manager's location in the United States, their interactions were conducted exclusively over Zoom. In 2022, she founded Bahng Entertainment with her manager, launching the company the next year.

She released her debut single, "Perfect Blues," in July 2023, with Bahng directing the accompanying music video while critics praised the release for showcasing her artistic side. In November 2023, her explicit cover of Jung Kook's "Seven" sparked debate on TikTok, responding to the criticism by saying she would use it as motivation. On 31 May 2024, she released her debut extended play, The Abysmal EP, which she wrote and co‑produced with collaborator Andrew Luce. To support the release, she announced The Abysmal Tour, a six‑city U.S. tour that began in Dallas, Texas and concluded in New York City.

=== 2025–present: The Misunderstood EP and second tour ===
Her first release following The Abysmal EP was the single "What Never Lived" in January 2025, co‑written with Andrew Luce which she debuted during her first tour. That same month, cosmetics brand Rom&nd announced Bahng as a global ambassador and released a limited‑edition collaboration for fans. She was included in Rolling Stone's Future of Music lineup at South by Southwest 2025 in February, performing on the opening night alongside Benson Boone, Laila!, Jasmine.4.T, and DJ Mel.

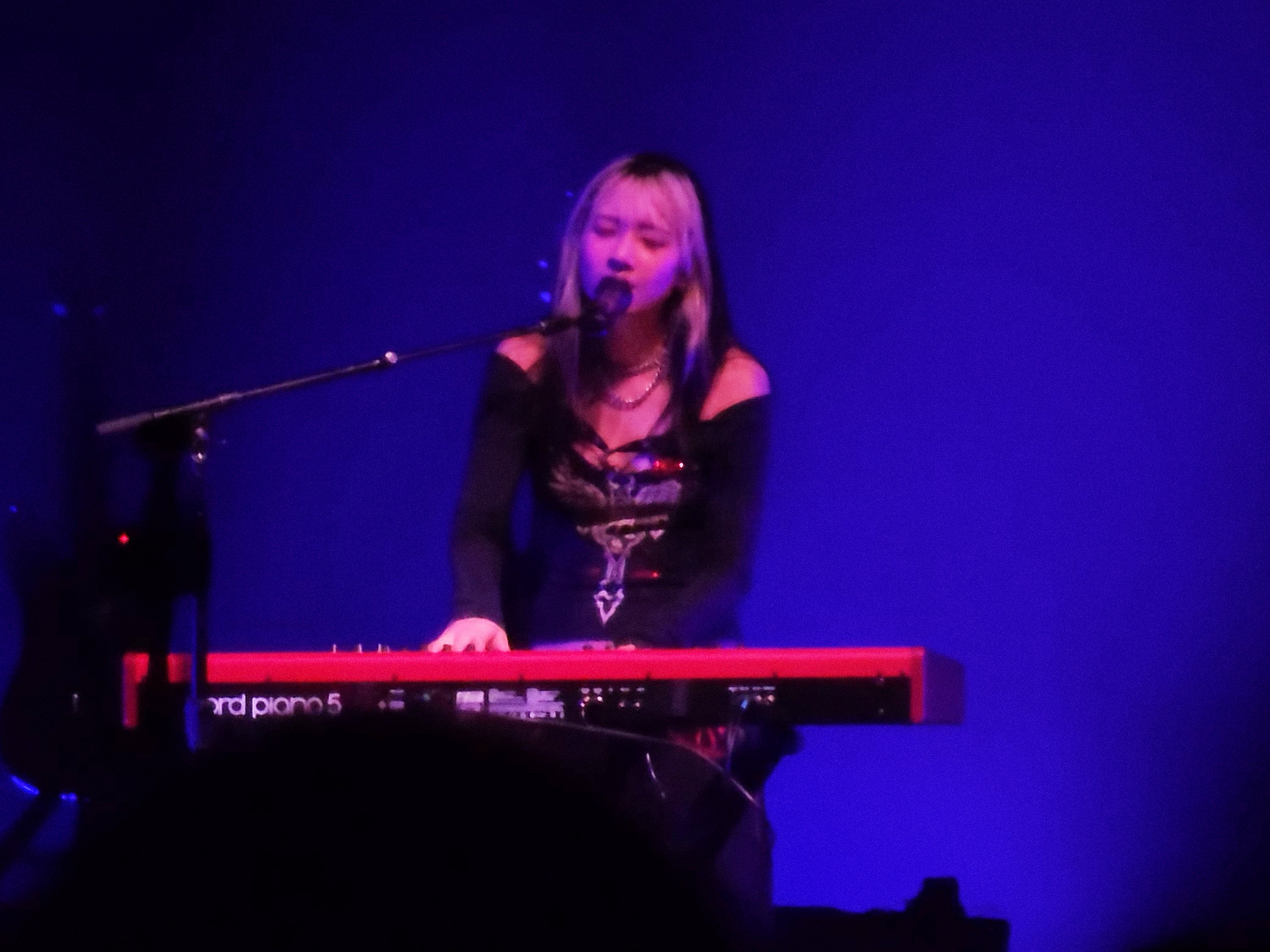
Bahng performing in Dallas, 2025.

In June 2025, Banhg was announced as a supporting act for American singer D4vd's Australian tour, alongside poet Them & I. She subsequently released the single "Sweet Satin Boy," which accumulated three million streams on Spotify. In August 2025, she collaborated with D4vd on the song "L.O.V.E.U," intended for the deluxe edition of D4vd's album Withered before its cancellation. The track was noted by Uproxx as being more upbeat and optimistic than D4vd's earlier work, with its music video depicted the two on a sunny beach. A month later, on 12 September, 2025, she released her second EP, The Misunderstood EP, and also announced a world tour to support the new project. At the Teen Vogue Summit 2025, she said she "cried ugly tears" while making the EP and explained that the project was a way to share her most vulnerable thoughts.

== Brand Partnerships and media appearances ==
Hannah Bahng has participated in several brand partnerships and promotional collaborations. In 2026, she was involved with the release of the "Berry Kiss Trio" and "Idol Hack Trio" collections in collaboration with the Korean cosmetics brand Rom&nd. Bahng has also participated in promotional collaborations with the skincare company Starface and the fashion collective Ksubi Crew. In late 2024, she participated in a collaboration connected to the Pokémon franchise and was involved in promotional work for the streetwear brand Vandy the Pink. Beyond commercial partnerships, Bahng has appeared in media publications and interviews as well. She was featured in an interview with Teen Vogue in 2025, where she discussed her music career and artistic development. She was also featured by BuzzFeed in late 2025 as part of media coverage related to her career and public activities.

== Musical style and influence ==
Bahng's music has been described as indie pop, indie rock, alternative R&B, and alternative rock. Her vocal style has been characterised by Rolling Stone as strong and "creating an atmospheric timbre that veers from plaintive to lush." Lyrically, her work explores themes of truth, longing, and heartache, drawing comparisons to contemporary artists such as Billie Eilish, Pictoria Vark, and Conan Gray. She describes her songwriting as a therapeutic, emotional, and self-reflective process, especially while making The Misunderstood EP.

== Discography ==
=== Extended plays ===
Title	Details
The Abysmal EP	Released: 31 May 2024; Label: Bahng Entertainment; Formats: CD, vinyl, digital download, streaming
The Misunderstood EP	Released: 12 September 2025; Label: Bahng Entertainment; Formats: CD, vinyl, digital download, streaming

=== Singles ===
Title	Year	Album
"Perfect Blues"	2023	The Abysmal EP
"Oleander"	2023	The Abysmal EP
"Pomegranate"	2024	The Abysmal EP
"Abysmal"	2024	The Abysmal EP
"What Never Lived"	2025	The Misunderstood EP
"Sweet Satin Boy"	2025	The Misunderstood EP
"L.O.V.E.U" (with d4vd)	2025	Non-album single
"Orchid / Flame"	2025	The Misunderstood EP
"Misunderstood"	2025	The Misunderstood EP

== Tours ==
- The Abysmal Tour: "Worst Night of Your Life" (2024–2025)
- The Misunderstood World Tour (2025–2026)
