= Tech University of Korea =

Polytechnic university in South Korea

- 한국공학대학교
- Former name: Korea Polytechnic University (1998–2022)
- Type: Private (Government supported)
- Established: 1998
- Academic staff: 258 (2021)
- Administrative staff: 176 (2021)
- Undergraduates: 7,031 (2021)
- Postgraduates: 384 (2021)
- Location: Siheung, Gyeonggi Province, South Korea; 37°20′25.4″N 126°44′0.6″E
- Website: www.tukorea.ac.kr

Tech University of Korea (TU Korea, 한국공학대학교), formerly Korea Polytechnic University (KPU, 한국산업기술대학교), is a polytechnic university in South Korea. KPU was established in 1998 by support from the Korea Ministry of Commerce, Industry and Energy.

Located in Siheung-si, Gyeonggi-do, South Korea. It was established to cultivate professional engineer with strong field adaptability through practical training.

In early 2007, the Techno Innovation Park was opened to accommodate approximately 1,400 residents and more than 40 engineering houses, ranging from 17 floors above ground to 1 underground.

== Organization ==
All departments, except the department of design and business administration, are engineering colleges, and there are no separate colleges, and three graduate schools are established: general graduate school, graduate school of knowledge-based technology and energy (specialized graduate school), and graduate school of industrial technology (specialized graduate school). Korea's first game engineering department, which specializes in game development, was established in 2002. In addition, the Faculty of Industry-Academy Cooperation has been established for customized re-education required by industry. An eight-week, four-semester system was implemented from the beginning of the school's 1998 to 2000. As of 2019, there are 6,879 undergraduate students, 351 master's students, and 58 doctoral students.
