= Single's Inferno =

South Korean reality dating series

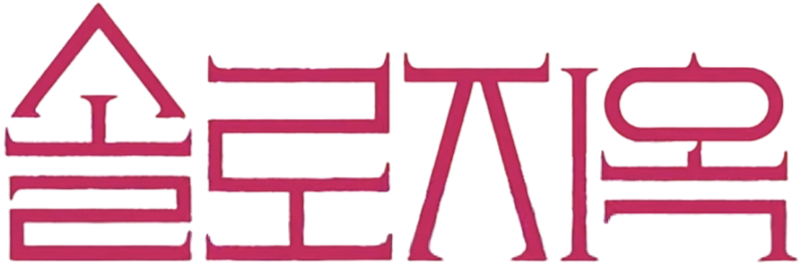
- Hangul: 솔로지옥
- Hanja: 솔로地獄
- Lit.: Solo Hell
- RR: Sollo jiok
- MR: Sollo chiok
- Genre: Reality television; Dating show; Variety show
- Written by: Ji Hyun-suk; Lee Jung-hwa
- Directed by: Kim Jae-won; Kim Na-hyun
- Presented by: Hong Jin-kyung; Lee Da-hee; Kyuhyun; Hanhae; Dex (Note: A season 2 contestant known by his Korean name: Kim Jin-young.) (season 3–5)
- Music by: Ryu Chung-yeol
- Opening theme: "Say Yes" by Jun Ha-young (season 1–3) "At Last" by Troy "chengcheng" Tang and Jasmine Park (season 4–5)
- Country of origin: South Korea
- Original language: Korean
- No. of seasons: 5
- No. of episodes: 53

Production
- Executive producer: Kim Soo-ah
- Running time: 56–82 minutes
- Production companies: JTBC (season 1–2); Shijak Company (Note: A production company founded in 2022 by ex-JTBC variety director Kim Jae-won. As of 2024, it is now operating as an affiliated company of JTBC's parent company, JoongAng Media Group, through the subsidiary company Studio Ah Yeah (SAY).) (season 2–5)

Original release
- Network: Netflix
- Release: December 18, 2021 – present

Single's Inferno (Korean: 솔로지옥) is a South Korean reality television series on Netflix. The program's hosts are model Hong Jin-kyung, actress Lee Da-hee, singer and Super Junior member Kyuhyun, rapper Hanhae, and YouTuber/cast member from season 2, Dex. The first season was released from December 18, 2021, to January 8, 2022. The second season was released from December 13, 2022, to January 10, 2023. The third season was released from December 12, 2023, to January 9, 2024. The fourth season was released from January 14, to February 11, 2025. The fifth season was released from January 20, 2026, to February 14, 2026.

== Concept ==
The show's main concept is taking attractive young singles and having them participate in typical dating show shenanigans against a minimalist survival show backdrop. Participants mingle and compete in games in order to secure a connection. Participants are left on an island (Inferno), and the mission is to leave with their love interest to Paradise. The location of the shoot is about an hour from Seoul, South Korea.

Around twelve singles attempt to find love on this island through challenges and getting to know each other throughout the season. While the show typically begins with a core group of about 9 to 12 contestants, the producers frequently introduce new surprise arrivals throughout the season to shake up the romantic dynamics. The show is known for its distinctively Korean social interactions, as seen through the participants’ understated forms of expression and intimacy as compared to the participants of Western dating shows. Furthermore, it does not focus exclusively on attraction and romance. The editors highlight comedic or awkward moments as well. Relationships and people explore learning about one another, not just physical relationships.

In the show, participants are given the opportunity to get to know each other through dates on the island where they reside during the duration of the show or through dates on Paradise Island, which is often a high-end, luxurious hotel where they are removed from the rest of the party to enjoy exclusive time with each other. The deserted island the contestants reside on, called Inferno, requires them to cook their own food, not use their electronics, and draw their own water. Beginning in Season 4, contestants no longer have to prepare their own food or collect water, as production now provides these necessities to make life on Inferno less challenging. Any discussion of age and occupation is also not allowed. The only thing to do is to date and win games in order to have the opportunity to escape the island. During the first episode, contestants are asked to write to a potential interest using a postcard. However, the chosen interest does not have to stay the same throughout the show. The games and free dates within the deserted island give contestants the time to make the decision of who they would like to go to Paradise with.

Paradise serves as the opposite of Inferno. It is the main goal for contestants due to its luxury, and for its freedom (contestants are free to ask about their interest's age/occupation). A contestant must pick another contestant to go to Paradise with them, but that other contestant must also pick the original contestant as well.

The final couplings are made in the last episode. In seasons 1, 2, and 4, the women stood at different points on the island. If a male contestant was interested in a woman, he walked up to her. If she accepted him and took his hand, they both left together as a match.

== Episodes ==
Season	Episodes	Originally released	
Season	Episodes	First released	Last released
1	8	December 18, 2021	January 8, 2022
2	10	December 13, 2022	January 10, 2023
3	11	December 12, 2023	January 9, 2024
4	12	January 14, 2025	February 11, 2025
5	12	January 20, 2026	February 10, 2026
S5 Reunion	6	February 14, 2026	February 14, 2026

No. overall	No. in season	Original release date
Season 1
1	1	December 18, 2021
The contestants are introduced to each other and to the island as they are familiarized with the rules of their new home for the next nine days. They then split into teams of three to explore the deserted island.
2	2	December 18, 2021
A game for the male contestants commences to win a date with two women. The first voting for matching couples happens to see who gets to escape to Paradise.
3	3	December 25, 2021
Once the couples come back from Paradise, it is time to choose a new interest for the next trip. This time, women are challenged to a game to choose two men to go on a lunch date with. Women are then asked to choose who they want to go to Paradise with.
4	4	December 25, 2021
Ji-a and Si-hun become closer. Se-hoon is disappointed that he didn't get to go to Paradise. The contestants are given free time to talk to whomever they choose.
5	5	January 1, 2022
Newcomers, Kim Su-min, Seong Min-ji, and Cha Hyun-seung, arrives at the Inferno. They are given the chance to choose who they want to take on a yacht date. So-yeon and Se-hoon talk, but it ends in a large disagreement.
6	6	January 1, 2022
The newcomers go on a yacht date with their chosen interest.
7	7	January 8, 2022
Se-hoon and Ji-yeon have a long talk and become closer during their date in Paradise. When the matched pairs come back to Singles Inferno, a new game for women commences. The top three women can choose their dates to Paradise.
8	8	January 8, 2022
Contestants go on a date with a partner of their choice for the last time before the last matching of who leaves the Inferno together.
Season 2
9	1	December 13, 2022
The second season begins with brand new contestants. After a day of getting to know one another by cooking together, the contestants are instructed to send a postcard to the person they are the most interested in.
10	2	December 13, 2022
The female contestants are instructed to play a game to win the opportunity to go on a lunch date with two men of their choice. Before the vote to go to Paradise, Nadine speaks to Dong-woo to get to know him better.
11	3	December 20, 2022
When the couples come back from Paradise, it is time to choose new partners for the next Paradise trip. It is the men's turn to play a game to win a lunch date with two women of their choice. A newcomer, Kim Jin-young, comes in to further complicate the blossoming relationships in the show.
12	4	December 20, 2022
Contestants are given free time to talk to a person of their choosing. So-e and Yoong-jae have a long talk about her unrequited feelings for him.
13	5	December 27, 2022
Couples that went to Paradise have different outcomes during their dates. During their trip to Paradise, Dong-woo and Nadine discover things about each other that can potentially change their future possibilities of a relationship. Jin-young and Seul-ki become closer.
14	6	December 27, 2022
More newcomers, Kim Se-jun and Lee Min-su, arrives to spice up the Inferno island. Yoong-jae and So-e have a private discussion where Yoong-jae was able to properly reject her.
15	7	January 3, 2023
Female contestants are challenged to a game to win a date in Paradise.
16	8	January 3, 2023
So-e ends up choosing Han-bin to go to Paradise as friends. Jong-woo and Seul-ki have time to become closer. It is the men's turn to play a game to be able to choose who to go to Paradise with.
17	9	January 10, 2023
During their time in Paradise, Jong-woo and Seul-ki are able to discuss her conflicting feelings between him and Jin-young. So-e and Se-jun have the chance to become closer on the Inferno island.
18	10	January 10, 2023
Contestants go on a date with a partner of their choosing before making the final decision of who they want to leave the Inferno with. The results are unexpected.
Season 3
19	1	December 12, 2023
The third season begins with three men and three women yearning for love arriving on the Inferno island, with the opportunity to leave for Paradise right away. The contestants instructed to write down the name of the individual they want on the ticket and give it to them. Two couples are able to go to Paradise. The day after knowing more about each other, a twist shocks the couples.
20	2	December 12, 2023
The twist is that there are two Inferno islands. The second Inferno island was shown, and the show goes back to Day 1. Newcomers to the show introduce themselves, and the first couple matching session commences. Only one couple able to go to Paradise. Couples are back to each Inferno island, but with a different pair, and contestants who stay are surprised after knowing that there are two Inferno islands. The second couple matching session with the same instructions commence, but this time they put the ticket in a mailbox.
21	3	December 12, 2023
Three couples are match and go to Paradise. Couples ingnites new energy and enjoy their day on Paradise, especially for one couple, who can't get enough of each other.
22	4	December 19, 2023
The three couples' conversation in Paradise continues. The two Infernos merge, and all the contestants meet and get to know each other. The first couple game begins with a special meal date as a reward. Couples pair up by choosing the same colored ball from a box. One man cannot participate if he draws the black ball. Won-ik and Ha-jeong wins the game and receive their reward. The other three couples go on a one-on-one lunch date. Singles gather together for a night's drink and have an honest conversation.
23	5	December 19, 2023
After a tense campfire discussion, several women are left upset, while Lee Jin-seok and An Min-young have a heartfelt conversation to clarify their connection. The next day, the women discuss their impressions of the men, with one participant receiving the harshest criticism. The arrival of a new female participant shifts the dynamic as she goes on mini-dates with all the men and chooses two to join her in Paradise. While sparks fly there, tensions erupt on Inferno when Yun Ha-jeong confronts Lee Gwan-hee about his behavior in a heated exchange.
24	6	December 26, 2023
Lee Gwan-hee and Choi Hye-seon reflect on their first date during a candid conversation about their connection. Meanwhile, the trio returns from Paradise, prompting the remaining men to eagerly question them about the new woman. A women's game takes center stage, narrowing the competition to three finalists, all vying for a date with the same man, Min-woo. Tensions rise as the women compete for his attention, and unexpected pairings emerge when the first winner chooses Min-woo. Back on Inferno, the remaining participants create a warm and fun atmosphere, gathering in one room to bond over a lighthearted game of questions.
25	7	December 26, 2023
26	8	January 2, 2024
27	9	January 2, 2024
28	10	January 9, 2024
29	11	January 9, 2024
Season 4
30	1	January 14, 2025
The first episode begins with an intriguing twist: two islands, one for women and one for men, separated by mystery. On the women's island, six women arrive, filling the chairs one by one, as curiosity grows about the absence of men. Laughter and speculation fill the air, but soon, the answer arrives—two men make their grand entrance. The winners of the men's games. Each man must make a bold choice: selecting one woman to join him in the luxurious Paradise. With their decisions made, the two couples set off on a journey to explore deeper connections, leaving the rest behind to wonder what lies ahead.
31	2	January 14, 2025
In this episode, the women compete in a game, and winner Kim A-rin earns the chance to visit the men's island. Meanwhile, the couples in Paradise are surprised to learn they won't return together. Instead, the women are dropped off at the men's island, where they meet the other bachelors. Through mini-dates, the six individuals get to know each other, leading to surprising choices about who will head to Paradise next. At the same time, the two original Paradise bachelors arrive at the women's island. However, their reception is far from warm, as some of the women still harbor mixed feelings about being overlooked during the first selection, despite the tension, they also participate in mini-dates, and the women must also decide who they want to join them in Paradise.
32	3	January 14, 2025
An unprecedented outcome on the women's island leaves one participant visibly upset, while on the men's island, connections deepen. In Paradise, couples share lighthearted moments, but upon returning, a major twist merges the two Inferno islands into one. As everyone gathers, previous matches and surprising new pairings come to light, sparking jealousy and curiosity. The tension peaks during the next challenge, where the women compete for a date. With the men offering their support, their interests become increasingly clear, further shifting the dynamics.
33	4	January 14, 2025
Lee Si-an, winner of the women's game, chooses Yuk Jun-seo as her date, cementing his reputation as the most sought-after participant. That evening, the group gathers for a lively BBQ, where they bond over food and drinks. As the night progresses, participants anonymously place chocolates in the mailbox of the person they admire, sparking curiosity and tension. While some connections grow stronger, others face disappointment, leading to drama within the group. The next morning brings an unexpected twist: all the women are invited to Paradise, where a surprise awaits—a new male participant joins the group, returning with them to Inferno and shaking up the dynamics once again.
34	5	January 21, 2025
35	6	January 21, 2025
36	7	January 28, 2025
37	8	January 28, 2025
38	9	February 4, 2025
39	10	February 4, 2025
40	11	February 11, 2025
41	12	February 11, 2025
Season 5
42	1	January 20, 2026
43	2	January 20, 2026
44	3	January 20, 2026
45	4	January 20, 2026
46	5	January 27, 2026
47	6	January 27, 2026
48	7	January 27, 2026
49	8	February 3, 2026
50	9	February 3, 2026
51	10	February 3, 2026
52	11	February 10, 2026
53	12	February 10, 2026
Season 5 Reunion
54	1	February 14, 2026
55	2	February 14, 2026
56	3	February 14, 2026
57	4	February 14, 2026
58	5	February 14, 2026
59	6	February 14, 2026

== Season 1 ==
=== Singles ===
Note: As of February 2026, no couple is still together.

==== Women ====
Name	Hangul	Age	Background
Shin Ji-yeon	신지연	March 26, 1997 (age 29)	University student (Majoring in Neuroscience at University of Toronto); Participated in the 2020 Miss Korea Chunhyang; Season 2's Shin Seul-ki participated in the pageant the same year.
Kang So-yeon	강소연	May 23, 1988 (age 38)	Boxer, clothing brand representative; Former JYP Entertainment trainee
Ahn Ye-won	안예원	1995 (age 30–31)	Fitness instructor, Pilates instructor, model
Song Ji-a	송지아	April 30, 1997 (age 29)	Stage name: Free 지아; Beauty YouTuber, model; Once hosted FashionN's Follow Me; Appeared in Channel A's Friends
Kim Su-min	김수민	December 10, 1998 (age 27)	Advertising model
Seong Min-ji	성민지	April 1, 1998 (age 28)	Beauty and apparel model

==== Men ====
Name	Hangul	Age	Background
Kim Hyeon-joong	김현중	November 26, 1994 (age 31)	Fitness trainer and model
Moon Se-hoon	문세훈	1995 (age 30–31)	Owner of a restaurant in Gangnam
Kim Jun-sik	김준식	1994 (age 31–32)	Health food brand representative
Choi Si-hun	최시훈	October 27, 1992 (age 34)	Apparel brand representative; Appeared in web series Kilimanjaro Cafe, Standby Curator and Romanced
Oh Jin-taek	오진택	1992 (age 33–34)	Suit shop Ascottage's CEO and co-founder
Cha Hyun-seung	차현승	May 2, 1991 (age 35)	Dancer, notably Sun-mi's back-up dancer

=== Coupling history ===
Single	Episode										
Single	1	2		3		4	5	6		7	8
Ji-a	Hyeon-joong	Selected	Hyeon-joong		Si-hun		Selected		Selected		Hyeon-joong
Ji-yeon	Si-hun	Selected	Si-hun		Jin-taek				Selected	Se-hoon	Se-hoon
So-yeon	Se-hoon		Jin-taek	Won and Chose	Se-hoon				Selected	Jin-taek	Jin-taek
Ye-won	Jun-sik		Jun-sik		Jun-sik						Jun-sik
Min-ji	Not in Inferno						Se-hoon	Se-hoon			Unselected
Su-min	Not in Inferno						Jun-sik	Se-hoon		Si-hun	Unselected
Hyun-seung	Not in Inferno						Ji-a	Ji-a	Ji-a		Ji-a
Hyeon-joong	Ji-a		Ji-a		Ji-yeon						Ji-a
Jin-taek	So-yeon		So-yeon		Ji-yeon				So-yeon	Selected	So-yeon
Jun-sik	Ji-a		Ji-a	Selected	Ye-won		Selected				Ye-won
Se-hoon	So-yeon	Won and Chose	Ji-yeon	Selected	Ji-yeon		Selected		Ji-yeon	Selected	Ji-yeon
Si-hun	Ji-a		Ji-yeon		Ji-a					Selected	Ji-a

Male Contestant
Female Contestant
Sent a letter to
Chose/Chosen for date in Inferno
Chose and didn't go to Paradise
Successfully paired and went to Paradise or Chosen/Chose someone to go to Paradise
Failed to make a final pair
Made a final pair

== Season 2 ==
=== Singles ===
Note: As of January 2026, no couple is still together.

==== Women ====
Name	Hangul	Age	Background
Lee Nadine	이나딘	May 1, 2000 (age 26)	Neuroscience major at Harvard University; Regularly featured with her younger sister on her mother's YouTube channel 'Nimo Fam'
Shin Seul-ki	신슬기	March 3, 1998 (age 28)	Piano major at Seoul National University; Participated in the 2020 Miss Korea Chunhyang along with Season 1 participant Shin Ji-yeon
Park Se-jeong	박세정	1997 (age 28–29)	Model, managed by YG KPlus; Modeled for brands such as BMW and Sony
Lee So-e	이소이	October 2000 (age 26)	Acting major at Hanyang University; Managed by Saram Entertainment for acting activities; Appeared in minor roles in Netflix series The Glory, JTBC series Snowdrop and SBS series The First Responders
Choi Seo-eun	최서은	April 16, 1995 (age 31)	Artist (painting); 2021 Miss Korea Jin
Lim Min-su	임민수	1997 (age 28–29)	Model and CEO of online clothing boutique

==== Men ====
Name	Hangul	Age	Background
Choi Jong-woo	최종우	1998 (age 27–28)	Barista of a family-owned cafe in Gangwon Province
Jo Yoong-jae	조융재	1991 (age 34–35)	Investment broker at Shinhan Investment Corp; Graduated with a Finance Management major from Hanyang University
Kim Han-bin	김한빈	1999 (age 26–27)	Chef
Shin Dong-woo	신동우	1991 (age 34–35)	Plastic surgeon; Graduated from Yonsei University's College of Medicine
Kim Jin-young	김진영	1995 (age 30–31)	YouTuber; Former ROKN UDT soldier
Kim Se-jun	김세준	July 31, 1996 (age 30)	Tailor at Ascottage, founded by Season 1 participant Oh Jin-taek

==== Coupling History ====
Single	Episode										
Single	1	2		3	4	5	6	7	8	9	10
Nadine	Dong-woo		Dong-woo			Dong-woo			Yoong-jae	Selected	Not selected
Seul-ki	Dong-woo		Dong-woo		Selected	Jin-young				Selected	Jong-woo
So-e	Yoong-jae	Won and Chose		Yoong-jae		Yoong-jae		Selected	Han-bin		Se-jun
Se-jeong	Yoong-jae			Yoong-jae		Jin-young					Not selected
Seo-eun	Jong-woo			Yoong-jae	Selected	Han-bin				Selected	Yoong-jae
Min-su	Not in Inferno							Jin-young	Jin-young		Not Selected
Se-jun	Not in Inferno							So-e			So-e
Jin-young	Not in Inferno				Won and Chose	Seul-ki		Selected	Selected	Nadine	Seul-ki
Jong-woo	Seul-ki	Selected		Seul-ki		Seul-ki				Seul-ki	Seul-ki
Yoong-jae	Se-jeong	Selected		Seo-eun		Nadine			Selected	Seo-eun	Seo-eun
Han-bin	Seo-eun			Seo-eun		Seo-eun			Selected		Seo-eun
Dong-woo	Nadine		Seul-ki			Nadine					Seul-ki

Male Contestant
Female Contestant
Sent a letter to
Chose/Chosen for date in Inferno
Chose and didn't go to Paradise
Successfully paired and went to Paradise or Chosen/Chose someone to go to Paradise
Failed to make a final pair
Made a final pair

== Season 3 ==
=== Singles ===
Note: As of July 2026, Lee Gwan Hee and Yu Si-Eun are together despite not being matched on the show.

==== Women ====
Name	Hangul	Age	Background
Kim Gyu-ri	김규리	1996 (age 29–30)	Model for fashion and beauty brands; Miss Korea 2022 participant; Graduated from Inha Technical College with a degree in Airline Operations
Choi Hye-seon	최혜선	1998 (age 27–28)	Freelance model; Bioinformatics major at Ewha Womans University; Master's degree in data science at Durham University
An Min-young	안민영	1998 (age 27–28)	Pilates studio director and instructor; Miss Korea Busan 2023
Yun Ha-jeong	윤하정	1998 (age 27–28)	Medical clothing company employee; Participated in the 2021 Miss Korea Chunhyang competition; Graduated from Suwon Science College with a degree in Aviation Tourism
Yu Si-eun	유시은	1997 (age 28–29)	Freelance model; Miss Korea 2022 runner-up; Graduated from Youngsan University with a degree in Aviation Service
Cho Min-ji	조민지	April 20, 1998 (age 28)	Student- studying to be an anchor in Ewha Womans University; Miss Korea 2021 runner-up

==== Men ====
Name	Hangul	Age	Background
Choi Min-woo	최민우	2000 (age 25–26)	Model
Lee Jin-seok	이진석	1993 (age 32–33)	Bakery café owner
Lee Gwan-hee	이관희	April 29, 1988 (age 38)	Professional basketball player (Seoul Samsung Thunders); YouTuber; Graduated from Yonsei University
Son Won-ik	손원익	1993 (age 32–33)	Real estate agent
Yun Ha-bin	윤하빈	1993 (age 32–33)	Actor; Appeared in minor role in SBS series My Demon; Main role in web drama Our D-Day
Park Min-kyu	박민규	1990 (age 35–36)	Korea Coast Guard Special Rescue Team (KCG-SSRT)

==== Coupling History ====
Single	Episode										
Single	1	2	3	4	5	6	7	8	9	10	11
Gyu-ri	Min-woo	Min-woo	Min-kyu	Jin-seok		Min-woo		Selected			Min-kyu
Hye-seon	Gwan-hee	Gwan-hee	Min-woo	Gwan-hee		Won-ik			Gwan-hee		Gwan-hee
Min-young	Jin-seok	Jin-seok	Won-ik	Min-kyu							Jin-seok
Ha-jeong	Min-kyu	Min-kyu	Gwan-hee	Won-ik					Ha-bin		Gwan-hee
Si-eun	Min-kyu	Min-kyu	Won-ik	Ha-bin		Min-kyu		Selected			Min-woo
Min-ji	Not in Inferno				Choose			Selected	Min-kyu		Gwan-hee
Min-woo	Min-young	Min-young	Gyu-ri	Not Paired	Selected	Selected					Si-eun
Jin-seok	Min-young	Min-young	Gyu-ri	Gyu-ri	Selected						Min-young
Gwan-hee	Hye-seon	Hye-seon	Ha-jeong	Hye-seon				Min-ji	Selected		Hye-seon
Won-ik	Si-eun	Si-eun	Si-eun	Ha-jeong		Selected		Si-eun			Si-eun
Ha-bin	Ha-jeong	Ha-jeong	Ha-jeong	Si-eun					Selected		Ha-jeong
Min-kyu	Ha-jeong	Ha-jeong	Gyu-ri	Min-young		Selected		Gyu-ri	Selected		Gyu-ri

Male Contestant
Female Contestant
Sent a ticket to
Chose and didn't go to Paradise
Successfully paired and went to Paradise or Chosen/Chose someone to go to Paradise
Won a mini-game and received a special meal date
Were paired for mini-game and lost and went on a normal meal date
Failed to make a final pair
Made a final pair

In episode 4, contestants were asked to give candies in the mailbox of anyone they were interested in. Multiple selections were allowed. However, only some of the candies given were revealed in the broadcast, and not all recipients or contestants’ choices were fully disclosed during the episode.

Episode 4 – Candy Mailbox Results
Contestant	Candies Received	Candies Given
Gyu-ri	4	Ha-bin
Hye-seon	3	Gwan-hee, Won-ik, Ha-bin
Min-young	1	Jin-seok, Ha-bin
Ha-jeong	1	Ha-bin
Si-eun	2	Ha-bin
Min-woo	1	
Jin-seok	1	Min-young
Gwan-hee	2	Gyu-ri
Won-ik	2	Gyu-ri, Hye-seon, Si-eun
Ha-bin	5	Gyu-ri, Hye-seon, Ha-jeong
Min-kyu	2	

== Season 4 ==
=== Singles ===
Note: As of January 2026, no couple is still together. During an appearance on The Manager in March 2025, it was revealed that Yuk Jun-seo and Lee Si-an were not together.

==== Women ====
Name	Hangul	Age	Background
Lee Si-an	이시안	25 February 1999 (age 27)	Former competitive swimmer; Idol School and Produce 48 contestant; Model
Chung You-jin	정유진	1996 (age 29–30)	Dancer/teacher; Korean and contemporary dance major at Ewha Womans University
Kim Min-seol	김민설	2000 (age 25–26)	Sportscaster/Freelance anchor; 2021 Miss Korea Chunhyang Jin
Bae Ji-yeon	배지연	17 February 1999 (age 27)	Spatial Designer; Fitness influencer and horseback rider
Kim Hye-jin	김혜진	1998 (age 27–28)	Model; 2020 Miss Korea Jin
Kim A-rin	김아린	1998 (age 27–28)	Model and YouTuber
Park Hae-lin	박해린	2000 (age 25–26)	Film Arts major at Sejong University; Mix Nine contestant

==== Men ====
Name	Hangul	Age	Background
Kim Tae-hwan	김태환	July 12, 1992 (age 34)	EDM DJ/Club owner; Model/actor
Kook Dong-ho	국동호	1993 (age 32–33)	Certified Public Accountant
Tae-oh "Theo" Jang	장태오	1994 (age 31–32)	Actor
Kim Jeong-su	김정수	1991 (age 34–35)	Bakery and coffee shop owner
Yuk Jun-seo	육준서	1 April 1996 (age 30)	Visual artist; Former ROKN UDT soldier (Steel Troops cast member); Actor and television personality
An Jong-hoon	안종훈	1993 (age 32–33)	Restauranteur

=== Coupling History ===
Single	Episode											
Single	1	2	3	4	5	6	7	8	9	10	11	12
Tae-hwan		Si-an					Ji-yeon		Ji-yeon			Ji-yeon
Dong-ho		A-rin			Hae-lin	A-rin	A-rin				Hae-lin	A-rin
Theo		Si-an					Si-an					Si-an
Jeong-su	Si-an	Hye-jin			Hae-lin	Si-an	Si-an		You-jin		Si-an	Si-an
Jun-seo	You-jin	Min-seol	Si-an				Si-an		Si-an			Si-an
Jung-hoon	Not in Inferno				Si-an & Hye-jin		Si-an				You-jin	Hye-jin
Hae-lin	Not in Inferno				Jeong-su & Dong-ho		Dong-ho				Dong-ho	Dong-ho
Si-an	Jeong-su	Theo	Jun-seo		Jung-hoon	Jeong-su	Jun-seo		Jun-seo		Jeong-su	Jun-seo
You-jin	Jun-seo	Dong-ho					Dong-ho		Jeong-su		Jung-hoon	Jeong-su
Min-seol		Jun-seo					Theo					Jun-seo
Ji-yeon		Jun-seo					Tae-hwan		Tae-hwan			Tae-hwan
Hye-jin		Jeong-su			Jung-hoon		Jung-hoon					Jung-hoon
A-rin		Theo				Dong-ho	Dong-ho					Dong-ho

Male Contestant
Female Contestant
Sent a ticket or chocolate to
Chose and didn't go to Paradise
Successfully paired and went to Paradise; or was chosen to go to Paradise
Won a game and chose to take someone to Paradise or have a special meal with
Failed to make a final pair
Made a final pair

In episode 4, contestants were asked to give a chocolate coin in the mailbox of anyone they're interested in. Multiple selections were allowed.

Results
Contestants	Chocolates Received
Tae-hwan	2
Dong-ho	2
Theo	3
Jeong-su	2
Jun-seo	4
Si-an	4
You-jin	2
Min-seol	1
Ji-yeon	1
Hye-jin	1
A-rin	4

== Season 5 ==
=== Singles ===
As of February 2026, Park Hee-sun and Lim Su-been are together alongside Kim Jae-jin and Lee Joo-young.

==== Women ====
Name	Hangul	Age	Background
Park Hee-sun	박희선	September 8, 2003 (age 22–23)	Student majoring in Information Systems at Carnegie Mellon University; CRM & Media intern at L'Oreal; Miss Korea 2024 Runner-up
Kim Go-eun	김고은	September 9, 2000 (age 25–26)	Model; Miss Korea 2022 Runner-up; Graduated from Inha Technical College's Department of Aviation
Ham Ye-jin	함예진	June 21, 1996 (age 29–30)	Freelance Announcer; Graduated from Yeonsung University's Department of Aviation
Kim Min-ji	김민지	April 5, 1996 (age 30)	Track and Field Athlete; Called “Karina of Track and Field or Track and Field Goddess”; Appeared in Kick a Goal and King of Survival: Tribal War; Graduated from Changwon National University's Department of Physical Education and has a Master's degree in Physical Education from Inha University
Lee Joo-young	이주영	March 2, 2000 (age 25–26)	Majored in Furniture Design in Sangmyung University; Craft Artist
Choi Mina Sue	최미나수	February 22, 1999 (age 27)	Student majoring in Communications in University of Illinois Urbana-Champaign; Miss Earth 2022 Winner; Born in Sydney, Australia; Appeared in Channel A's reality show Battle for Tenancy: Penthouse, as well as in dramas DNA Lover (TV Chosun), Law and the City (tvN) and Melo Movie (Netflix)
Lee Ha-eun	이하은	December 24, 2003 (age 22)	Beauty Model; Former Hip-hop Dancer; Graduated from Ewha Womans University's Department of Dance

==== Men ====
Name	Hangul	Age	Background
Youn Hyeon-jae	윤현제	December 23, 1999 (age 26–27)	Works for an IT firm; Mister International Korea 2024 First Runner-up; Participated at the Mister Global 2024 as Mister Global Korea; Graduated from Chung-Ang University's Department of Sports with a degree in sports management
Song Seung-il	송승일	December 1, 2001 (age 24–25)	Fashion Marketer
Shin Hyeon-woo	신현우	1998 (age 27)	Coach for a handball team; Former athlete
Kim Jae-jin	김재진	March 14, 1998 (age 28)	Contemporary Dancer and Teacher; Majored in Modern Dance in Hanyang University; Stage Fighter contestant
Woo Sung-min	우성민	December 30, 1996 (age 29–30)	Optician
Lim Su-bin	임수빈	December 22, 2002 (age 23–24)	Model; Former Baseball Pitcher
Lee Sung-hoon (Samuel)	이성훈	1998 (age 27)	Quantitative trader at a hedge fund; Former AI Software Engineer at Google, interned at Snowflake Inc., interned at Amazon, interned at Accenture; Graduated from UC Berkeley with a degree in Math and Computer Science
Jo I-geon	조이건	June 5, 1992 (age 33)	Actor; Appeared in Netflix series The Trunk, IHQ's Eden 2: Descendants of Instinct; Graduated from Seoul Institute of the Arts' Department of Acting

=== Coupling History ===
Single	Episode													
Single	1	2			3	4	5	6	7	8	9	10	11	12
Hyeon-jae		Joo-young		Joo-young					Won special meal	Joo-young		Joo-young		Joo-young
Seung-il		Mina Sue	Ye-jin		Min-ji			Min-ji		Mina Sue				Min-ji
Hyeon-woo		Go-eun	Hee-sun					Go-eun	Won special meal	Go-eun		Did not select		Go-eun
Jae-jin	Ye-jin			Joo-young		Won photo shoot challenge	Ha-eun		Won special meal		Joo-young			Joo-young
Sung-min	Min-ji		Go-eun	Go-eun			Ha-eun							Go-eun
Su-been	Not in Inferno	Mina Sue			Mina Sue					Hee-sun	Min-ji			Hee-sun
Sung-hoon	Not in Inferno	Mina Sue			Mina Sue					Mina Sue	Hee-sun		Won special meal	Mina Sue
I-geon	Not in Inferno						Ye-jin & Go-eun					Go-eun		Go-eun
Hee-sun		Su-been	Hyun-woo							Su-been	Sung-hoon			Su-been
Go-eun		Seung-il	Sung-min	Sung-min		Won photo shoot challenge	I-geon	Hyeon-woo	Won special meal	Hyeon-woo		I-geon		Sung-min
Ye-jin	Jae-jin		Seung-il				I-geon			I-geon				Chose No One
Min-ji	Sung-min				Seung-il			Seung-il		Seung-il	Su-been		Won special meal	Seung-il
Joo-young	Not in Inferno	Hyeon-woo		Jae-jin					Won special meal	Hyeon-jae	Jae-jin	Hyeon-jae		Jae-jin
Mina Sue	Not in Inferno	Seung-il			Su-bin					Seung-il				Sung-hoon
Ha-eun	Not in Inferno						Sung-min & Jae-jin		Won special meal	Jae-jin				Jae-jin

Male Contestant
Female Contestant
Sent a letter/ticket or a chocolate to
Chose and didn't go to Paradise
Successfully paired and went to Paradise; Choose or was chosen to go to Paradise
Won a game and chose to take someone to Paradise or have a special meal with or won a special reward
Failed to make a final pair
Made a final pair
Chose No One

In Episode 2, the contestants will participate in a game to win a Special Meal. This game is Couples Dodgeball. The team with the last surviving couple will win the game and have the Special Meal.

Game Result
Chromatic Team	Achromatic Team
Ye-jin & Seung-il	Kim Min-ji & Hyun-jae
Hee-sun & Hyeon-woo	Joo-young & Jae-jin
Go-eun & Sung-min	Mina Sue & Su-bin
Sung-hoon (did not participate)
Winner: Chromatic Team

In Episodes 3 and 4, the contestants have a new challenge: a Photo Shoot challenge. The concept that the contestant will try to capture is "The Hottest Couple on Earth". The couple that wins first place through a vote and is deemed "The Hottest Couple" will receive a special reward. The women will draw a ball with a number and choose a partner in that order. Since there is one extra male contestant, one of the girls will be allowed to select two male partners.

Photo Shoot Challenge
Women Contestant	Male Partner
1.Joo-young	Hyeon-woo
2.Hee-sun	Su-bin
3.Min-ji	Seung-il
4.Ye-jin	Hyeon-jae
5.Mina Sue	Sung-hoon; Seugmin
6.Go-eun	Jae-jin

In episode 4, contestants were asked to give a red chocolate to the person they currently like and a gold chocolate to the person they would like to know better.

Results
Contestants	Red Chocolates Received	Gold Chocolates Received
Su-bin	1	0
Hee-sun	0	1
Jae-jin	1	2
Hyeon-woo	0	3
Go-eun	2	2
Seug-min	1	1
Mina Sue	1	1
Sung-hoon	1	0
Ye-jin	0	1
Seung-il	1	0
Min-ji	2	1
Hyeon-jae	1	0
Joo-young	2	1

== Release ==
Netflix has confirmed the release date of season one which would be on December 18, 2021, with eight episodes. The season two was confirmed and released on December 13, 2022, with ten episodes. The production of season three was confirmed with changes in rules and location, which was released on December 12, 2023. Season four production was confirmed and is slated to premiere on January 14, 2025.

== Reception ==
It has been described as a Korean version of Bachelor in Paradise. Single's Inferno has been ranked among Netflix's Global Top 10 list, becoming the first Korean reality show to reach the list. It became popular in many regions, and the hashtag #singlesinferno was trending on social media throughout its run.

== Controversies ==
There had been a handful of controversies during and after the show. While the show was popular as it was airing, some fans were irked by the amount of comments season one had on one contestant's, Shin Ji-Yeon, skin. In Korea, the beauty standard is to have "white skin." It is noticeable how often male and female contestants commented and complimented her white skin. Netizens criticized the way the show portrayed having "white skin" as something more desirable than not.

After season one, female contestant Song Ji-a received backlash for wearing fake luxury items. Because her content is about her high maintenance lifestyle and because she regularly shared reviews about certain luxury products, fans were disappointed by her admittance that the rumors of her wearing fake items were partially true. She has since apologized on her social media and deleted posts that showed these fake items. South Korea outlaws the selling and production of counterfeit goods. However, buyers who did not recognize the items were counterfeit are not considered to have broken the law.

== After filming ==
In May 2024, season 1 contestant Si-hun announced his engagement to singer-songwriter Ailee and they married later that year.

== See also ==
- Korean wave
- Bachelor in Paradise
- Love Island
