= Gumi Sangmo Church =

Presbyterian church in Gumi, South Korea

- 구미상모교회
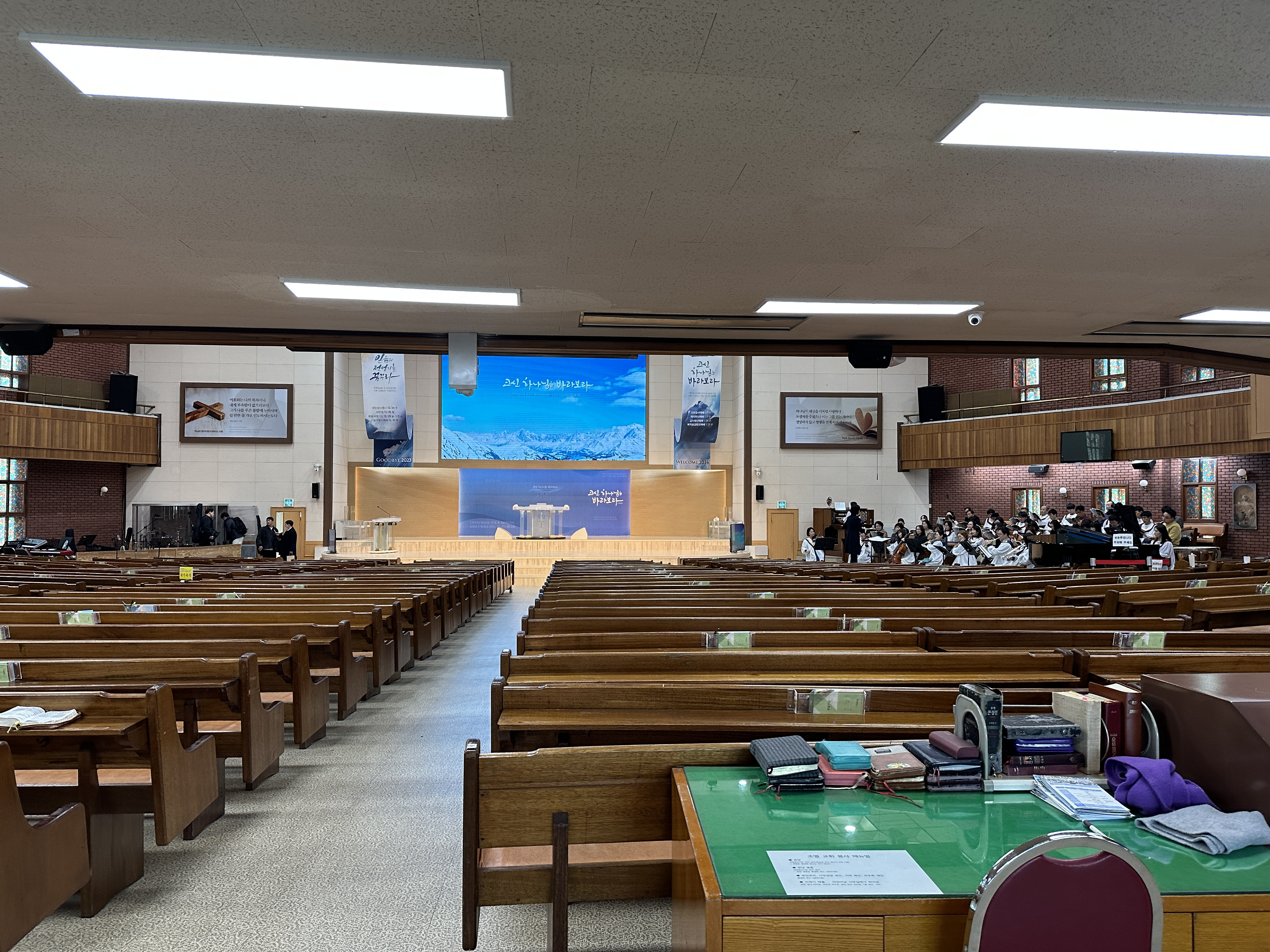
- Inside the main hall of the main building (2023)
- Gumi Sangmo Church
- 36.08469°N 128.34961°E
- Address: 69-5 Parkchunghee-ro, Sangmo-dong, Gumi, North Gyeongsang Province, South Korea
- Denomination: Presbyterian Church in Korea (HapDong)
- Website: http://www.sangmoch.co.kr/ (in Korean)

History
- Founded: March 13, 1901
- Founder: Jeong In-baek

Gumi Sangmo Church (Korean: 구미상모교회; Hanja: 龜尾上毛敎會), alternatively Sangmo Church, is a Presbyterian Church in Sangmo-dong, Gumi, North Gyeongsang, South Korea. It is of the HapDong branch of Presbyterian churches in South Korea. The church was founded on March 13, 1901, and celebrated its 100th anniversary in 2021.

== History ==
The congregation was founded by Koreans during a period when most churches were founded by Western missionaries. Jeong In-baek (정인백) was converted to Christianity by notable missionary Horace Grant Underwood. On the church's founding date, five men and five women held a service at Jeong's house. At the time, it was the second congregation in Seonsan-gun. The church, and Christianity in general, was met with pushback in its early period, as foreign influences were then shunned by Koreans.

In April 1903, to meet the needs of the growing congregation (around 30), a new thatched-roof chapel was constructed. Around this time, it received its name: the Presbyterian Church of Korea Sangmo Church (대한예수교장로회 상모교회). By March 21, 1926, Jeong In-myeong (정인명) was appointed the church's first elder, the congregation reached a size of around 70, and a new 59.4 m^{2} (639 ft^{2}) chapel with a tiled roof was constructed.

The building was damaged during the Korean War, and North Korean soldiers were stationed in it.

On November 2, 1967, land was purchased for a new expansion and renovation of church facilities. This was done with significant resources donated by Park Chung Hee, then the President of South Korea. Church facilities were again expanded on April 30, 1978, and August 28, 1986. A plot for a cemetery was purchased in February 1987. More expansions occurred on November 4, 1994, January 12, 1996, and November 22, 2000.

== Relationship to Park Chung Hee ==
Park Chung Hee, leader of South Korea from 1961 to 1979, attended the church for around six years, during his elementary school years. The building is around 200 metres (660 ft) away from Park's birthplace and childhood home. His contemporaries recalled that he diligently attended the church's Sunday school, and went Christmas caroling with others.

After Park became leader, he donated money and construction assistance to the church to improve its facilities. Park toured the church in 1966 while visiting his hometown, and commented on the damaged state of the building. Park was not a Christian, but Park's sister, Park Geun Ryeong reportedly became one.

Park's legacy is controversial in South Korea. While he has been honored at the church, there has been some pushback to further associating the church with him.
