= D. lepidus =

D. lepidus may refer to:

- Dendryphantes lepidus, a jumping spider species in the genus Dendryphantes
- Drassyllus lepidus, a ground spider species in the genus Drassyllus

== See also ==
- Lepidus (disambiguation)
