= Geumo Land =

Amusement park in Gumi, South Korea

- Interactive map of Geumo Land
- Location: Gumi, North Gyeongsang Province, South Korea
- Coordinates: 36.113°N 128.316°E
- Website: gumoland.com

Geumo Land (Korean: 금오랜드) is an amusement park near the base of Geumosan, Gumi, North Gyeongsang Province, South Korea. It was founded in

The park has a petting zoo, a swimming pool, an ice rink, a facility for sledding, and a number of rides. A fire happened in the zoo in 2023, resulting in the deaths of 100 animals.
