= Park Chung Hee Gymnasium =

Indoor arena in Gumi, South Korea

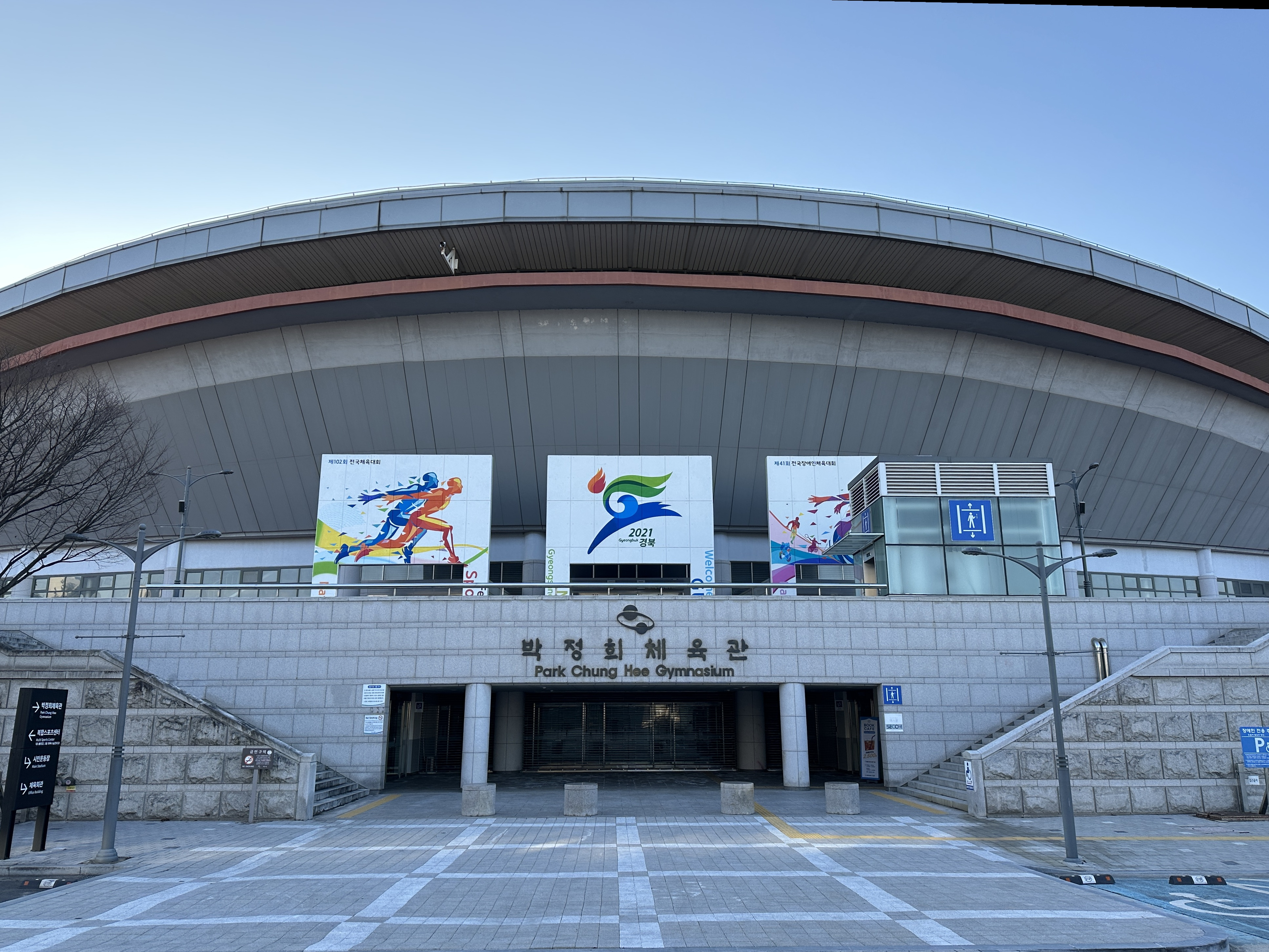
- East entrance (2023)
- Interactive map of Park Chung Hee Gymnasium
- Former names: Gumi Gymnasium
- Address: 375-19 Parkchunghee-ro, Gumi, North Gyeongsang Province, South Korea

Construction
- Groundbreaking: December 29, 1996
- Opened: February 15, 2001

The Park Chung Hee Gymnasium (Korean: 박정희체육관; Hanja: 朴正熙體育館) is an indoor arena in Gwangpyeong-dong, Gumi, North Gyeongsang Province, South Korea. It was first opened on February 15, 2001, as Gumi Gymnasium (구미체육관), and received its current name on February 5, 2002.

Construction began on December 29, 1996, and completed on December 29, 2000. The facilities first opened for use on February 15, 2001.

It is a dome-shaped building with one underground and three above-ground floors. A variety of indoor sports can be played on its main arena, including basketball, volleyball, handball, badminton, and ssireum (Korean wrestling). It has 6,277 seats, with 1,312 of those being deployable depending on the need. There is also a deployable stage that can be placed on the arena. A variety of other sports can be played on the first floor of the building in smaller facilities, including table tennis. A weight room, offices, shower rooms, and referee rooms are also present. The venue has also hosted a variety of other non-sporting events, including job fairs and cultural events.

The stadium's name has been criticized as an example of "excessive hero worship" in Gumi, as there are a large number of memorials to Park in the city.
