= Drassyllus biglobus =

Scientific classification
- Kingdom: Animalia
- Phylum: Arthropoda
- Subphylum: Chelicerata
- Class: Arachnida
- Order: Araneae
- Infraorder: Araneomorphae
- Family: Gnaphosidae
- Genus: Drassyllus
- Species: D. biglobus

Binomial name
- Drassyllus biglobus Paik, 1986

Synonyms
- Drassyllus truncatus Paik, 1992

Species of spider

Drassyllus biglobus is a species of spider in the family Gnaphosidae, and was first described in 1986 by Paik Kap Yong. It was redescribed in 2013 by Mikhail M Omelko; Yuri M Marusik and Byung-Woo Kim who found it to be the same species as Drassyllus truncatus and extended its distribution.

It is found in the far-east of Russia (Ussuriysk) and in Korea (where it was first collected on Geumosan Mountain in Gyeongsangbuk-do). It can be found in leaf litter and under rocks.
