= Birthplace of Park Chung Hee =

President's house in Gumi, South Korea

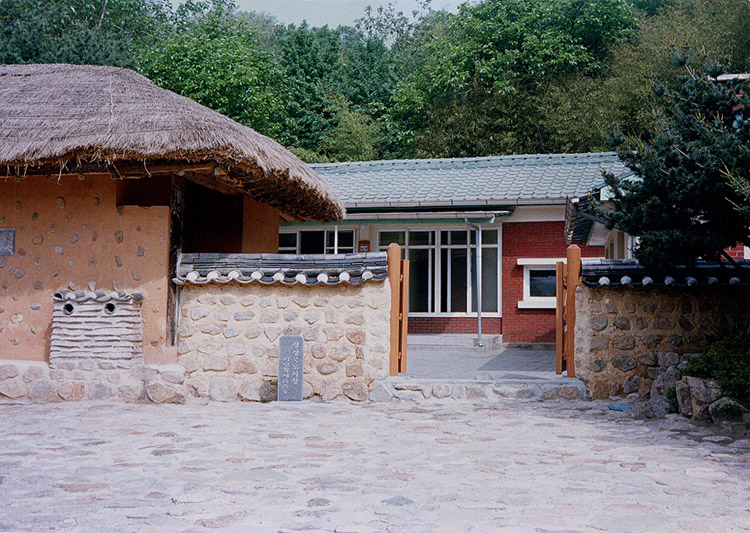
- The home; the new anbang is the red brick building (center). The thatched roof building (left) is the original sarangchae

General information
- Location: 107 Parkchunghee-ro, Gumi, North Gyeongsang, South Korea
- Coordinates: 36.088333°N 128.349167°E
- Completed: 1900 or 1916
- Renovated: 1964

Technical details
- Floor area: 2,672 square metres (28,760 ft^{2})

Website
- presidentparkchunghee.or.kr (in Korean)

Korean name
- Hangul: 박정희 대통령 생가
- Hanja: 朴正熙 大統領 生家
- RR: Bak Jeonghui daetongnyeong saengga
- MR: Pak Chŏnghŭi taet'ongnyŏng saengga

An exhibit of the birthplace and childhood home of President Park Chung Hee (Korean: 박정희 대통령 생가) is currently located in Sangmo-dong, Gumi, North Gyeongsang Province, South Korea. Park was the 1963–1979 President of South Korea. The home was registered as Cultural Heritage No. 86 of North Gyeongsang on February 25, 1993.

Park was born in the home, and lived there until 1937. Other members of his family continued to occupy it late into the 20th century, although they have since moved out.

The home was built in either 1900 or 1916. The exhibit consists of a number of buildings, including an anchae, a sarangchae, and a memorial hall to Park and his wife.

== Description ==
=== Original appearance ===
His childhood home originally consisted of an anchae (larger building for women) and a sarangchae (used mainly by men). Both buildings were rectangular in shape. Both buildings were made with tree branches and mud mixed with straw, and had thatched roofs and dirt floors. Between the two buildings was a small courtyard, and a well for water.

The larger room of the sarangchae, which Park was born in, is 2 by 2.3 metres (6.6 ft × 7.5 ft). The ceiling of Park's bedroom in the sarangchae is reportedly so low that even Park, who was short in stature, would have had to duck his head while standing up.

=== Current appearance ===
The anbang has since been replaced with a more modern L-shaped brick building with concrete flooring. The authenticity of the sarangchae is disputed. Most government and Park family-affiliated sources claim that the sarangchae is authentic. However, Chong-Sik Lee was skeptical of this claim. He wrote in his 2012 biography of Park: "The shrine-like appearance of the reconstructed house seems an inaccurate recreation of the original, which I saw in an old photo". The well has also been replaced with a more modern pump.

In addition to these two buildings, a memorial hall commemorating Park and his wife Yuk Young-soo is right next to the compound.

These buildings are open to the public as a museum and memorial to Park.

== History ==
The house was built either around 1900 (according to the Gumi local government website) or in 1916 (after Park's father moved to Sangmo-dong, according to biographer of Park Cho Gab-je). According to Cho, Park's father chose the site of the house because it was then nearly completely surrounded by dense forest, which removed the need to erect walls around the house. The anchae was constructed facing north, in order to have the trees and a nearby hill block the wind.

The Park family was desperately poor, and Park's mother was 43 at the time of his birth. The youngest of seven children, Park was born in the largest room of the sarangchae and lived there until he graduated from Taegu Normal School in 1937. For some time, there was another earthen hut outside of the sarangchae that belonged to Park's brother Mu Hee. The Park family continued to live at the home until well after Park's departure.

According to Park's autobiography, the house stayed in much the same condition until the 1950 Korean War. At one point, the house was hit with an incendiary bomb, which blinded one of its residents. By the end of the war, the anbang was destroyed. Also destroyed was a foot-operated rice pounder that Park's mother had once used to attempt to abort Park in the womb. Park, who wanted to remember what had almost happened to him, asked his eldest brother to make a copy of it. The older Park did so, and placed at the house, where it now remains. The anbang was first rebuilt as another earthen thatched-roof structure. It was later demolished and replaced with a more modern brick-and-concrete structure in 1964, just after Park seized power in the May 16 coup.

=== Construction of the memorial hall ===
In 1993, the government of Daegu announced the construction of the memorial hall, with a target construction start date of 1997. Construction did not begin by the target year. In 1999, President Kim Dae-jung, who was once such a fierce rival of Park that Park had allegedly ordered his kidnapping, pledged on the campaign trail to support the construction of the hall. Kim's administration created a funding plan, whereby if 50 billion won in private donations was collected, the government would pay an additional 20 billion to fund the construction. However, the government retracted this plan in 2005, which led to a lawsuit. It eventually lost the lawsuit in 2008 and was made to reinstate the plan. However, by that point, only 10 billion had been raised.

The construction of the hall was highly controversial. In 2000, a number of progressive social groups and historians formed a coalition entitled "National Solidarity Against the Park Chung Hee Memorial Hall" (박정희기념관 반대 국민연대) to protest its creation.

Construction eventually began in 2002, but stalled for years due to opposition and funding challenges. It was still not completed by 2008.

=== Arson attack ===
Around 3 p.m. on December 1, 2016, a man poured paint thinner in the inside of the memorial hall and set it on fire. The inside of the building, including the portraits and dedications to Park and his wife, was destroyed. The fire singed the thatched roof of the sarangchae, but was extinguished before significant damaged occurred. The fire was extinguished within ten minutes, and the man who lit it was arrested on the spot. The man stated that he had intended to retaliate against the Park family due to the emerging Park Geun-hye corruption scandal around that time (that same scandal eventually led to her impeachment). The man had a history of similar crimes; for example, in December 2012, he set fire to the birthplace of President Roh Tae-woo and served an 18-month suspended prison term. He expressed no remorse for his actions. The government of Gumi then committed ₩90 million ($77,600) to restoring the memorial.

== Nearby memorials and controversy ==
This house is one of many memorials to Park in Gumi.

- The street the home is on is named "Parkchunghee-ro".
- Nearby is a 5 m (16 ft) tall bronze statue of Park that was built in 2011 using ₩600 million ($541,000) in donations.
- The city government funded a musical production about Park that costed ₩2.8 billion ($2,480,000).
- A 25 km^{2} (2,500 ha) theme park on Park's political initiative, the Saemaul Undong is nearby.
- The also nearby Park Chung-hee Presidential Museum opened in 2021.

There are a number of other smaller monuments as well. Members of the Gumi branch of the organization People's Solidarity for Participatory Democracy described the memorials and the significant amount of public money used to make them as "excessive hero worship that has no economic benefits". Park's legacy as an oppressive military dictator is a large factor in the controversy.

President Yoon Suk Yeol has visited the house a number of times. He visited it in September 2021, February 2022, and February 2023. On his third visit, Yoon pushed back against criticisms about spending on memorials dedicated to Park. He argued that even more should be spent. John Lee, writing for Korea PRO, argued that Yoon attempts to link himself to Park to benefit from Park's popularity amongst South Korean conservatives. Lee called Yoon's visit "a cynical attempt at shoring up political support before next year's vital parliamentary election".

== Gallery ==
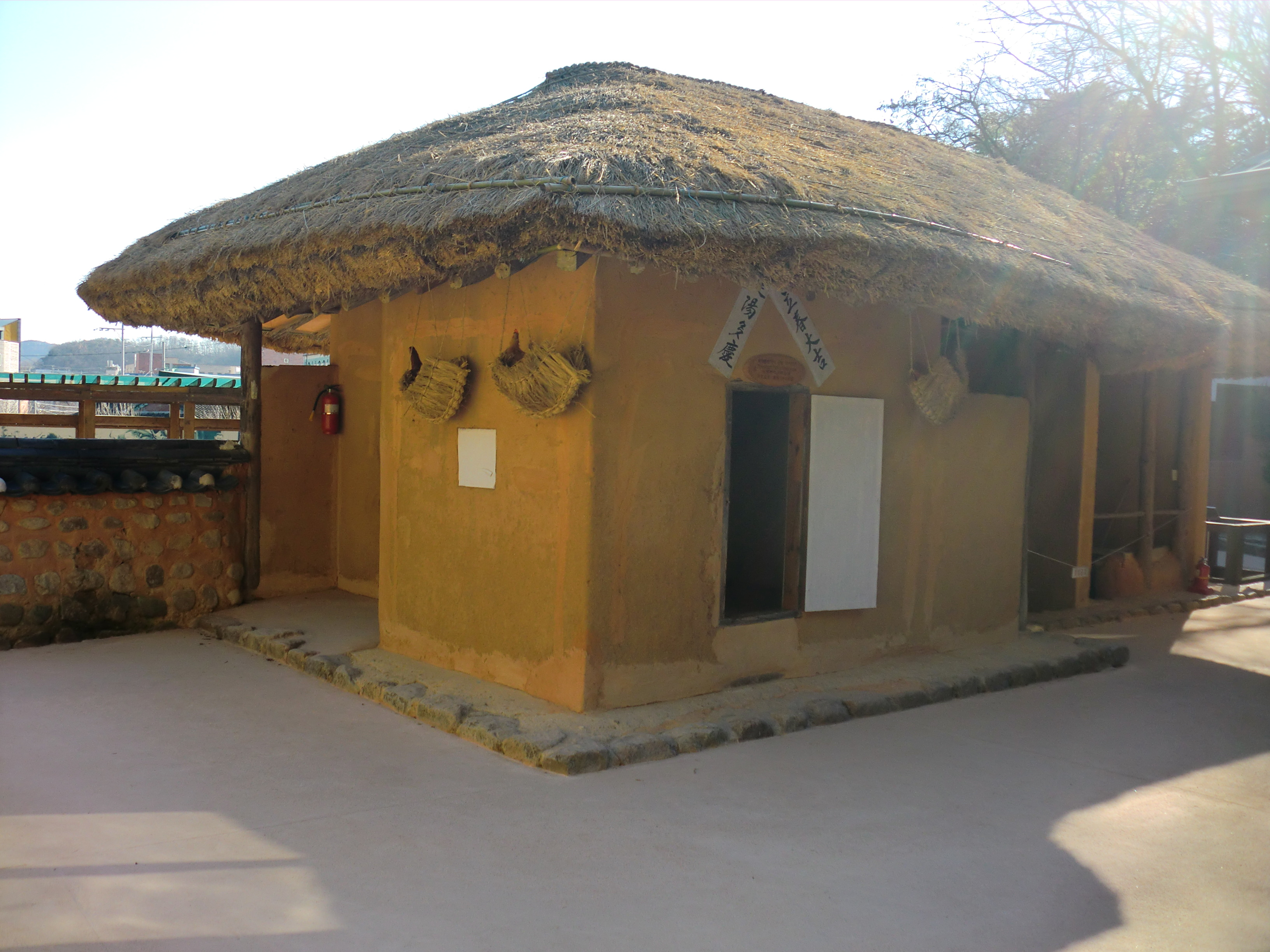
The original sarangchae (2015)

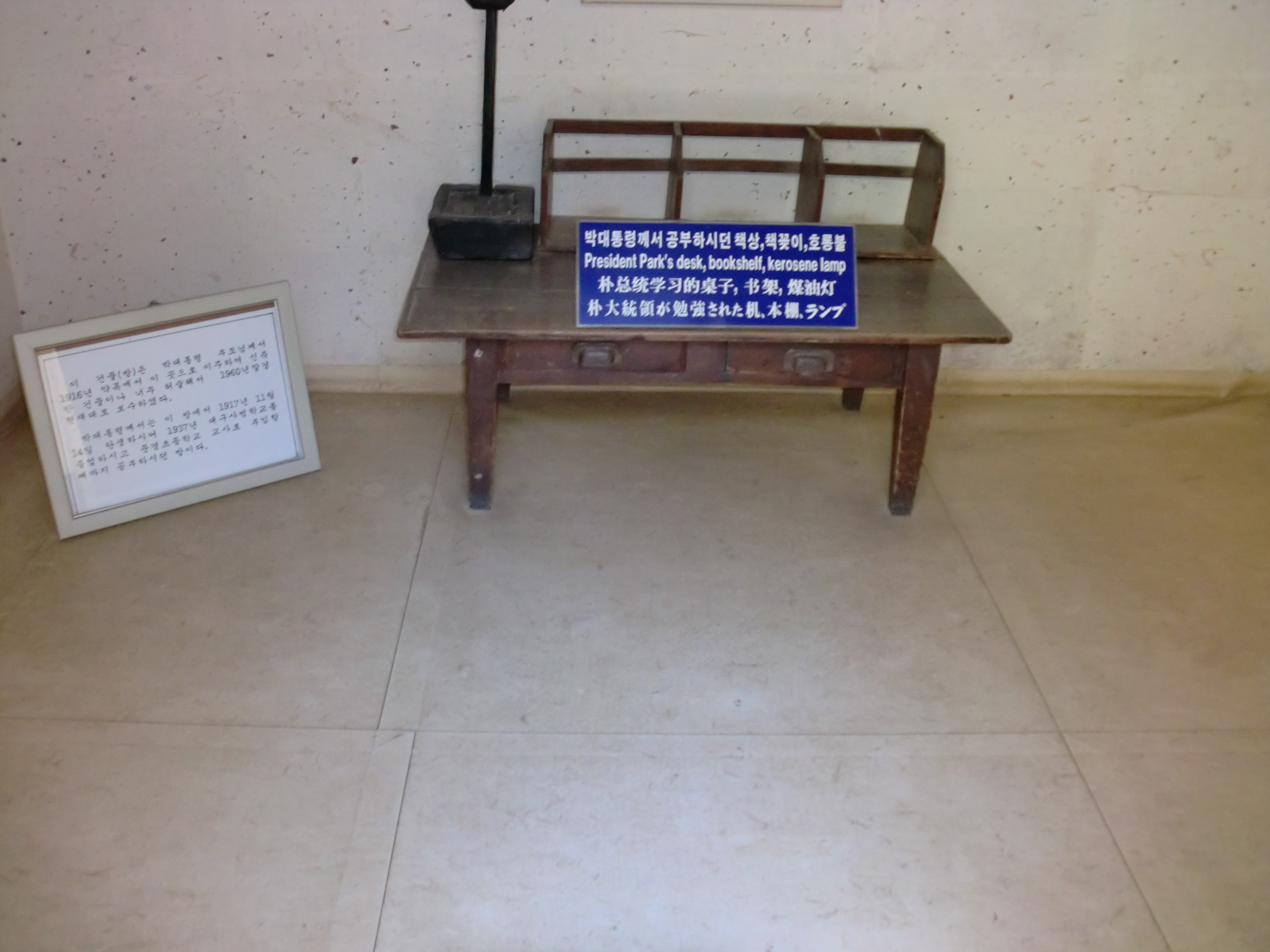
The desk Park used as a child (2016)

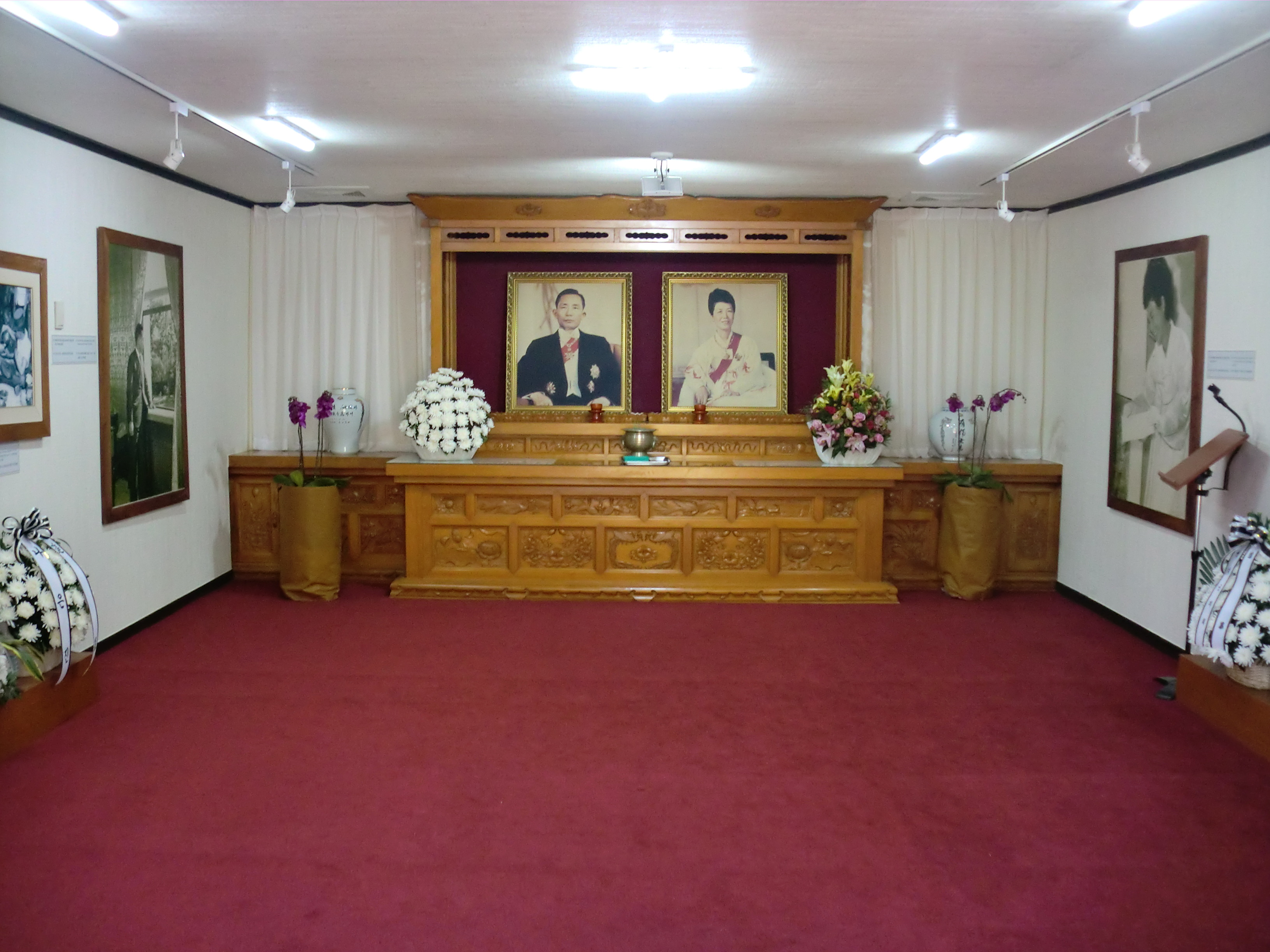
The inside of the adjacent memorial to Park and his wife Yuk Young-soo before the arson attack (2015)

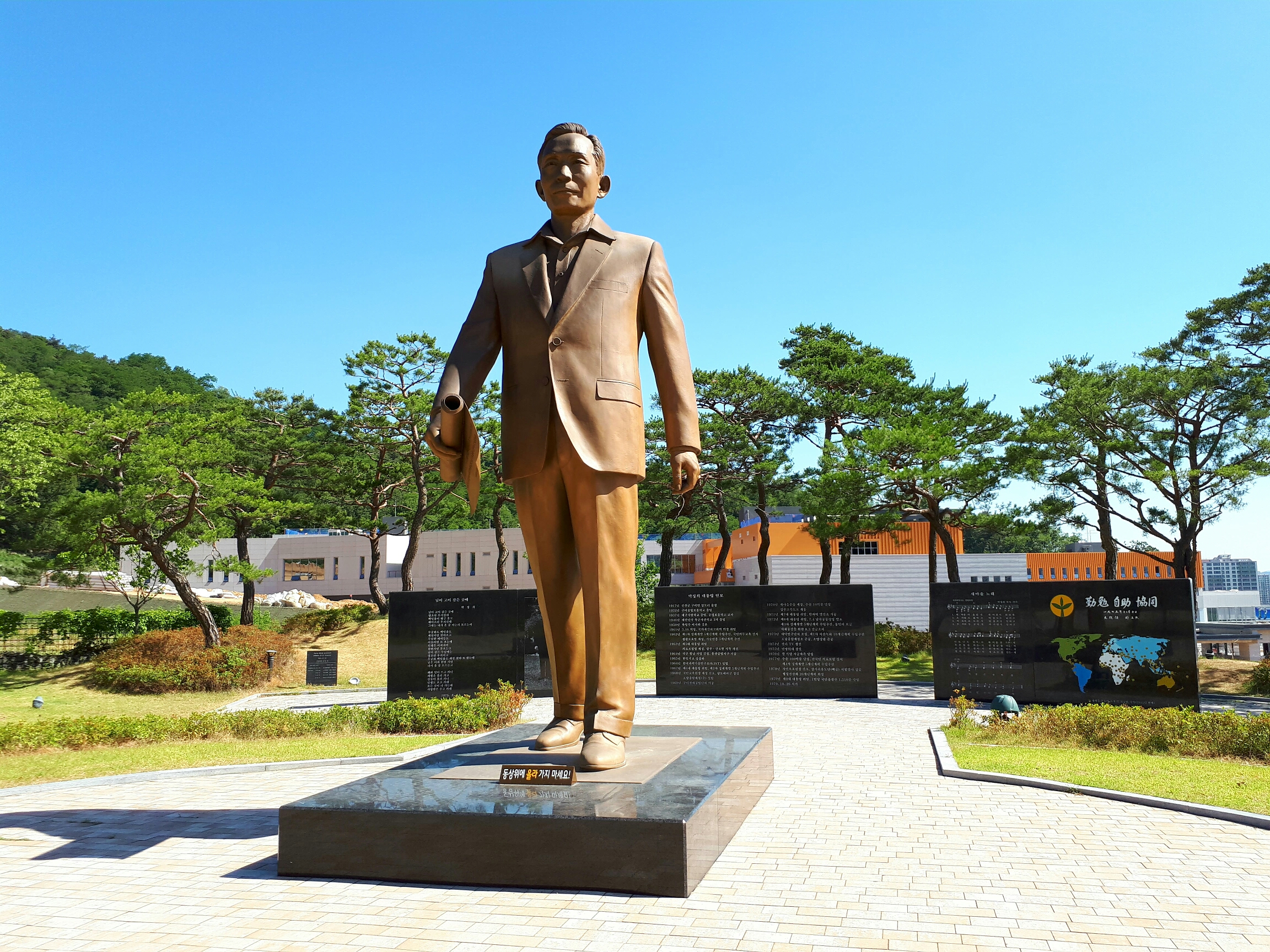
The five-meter-tall bronze statue of Park (2017)

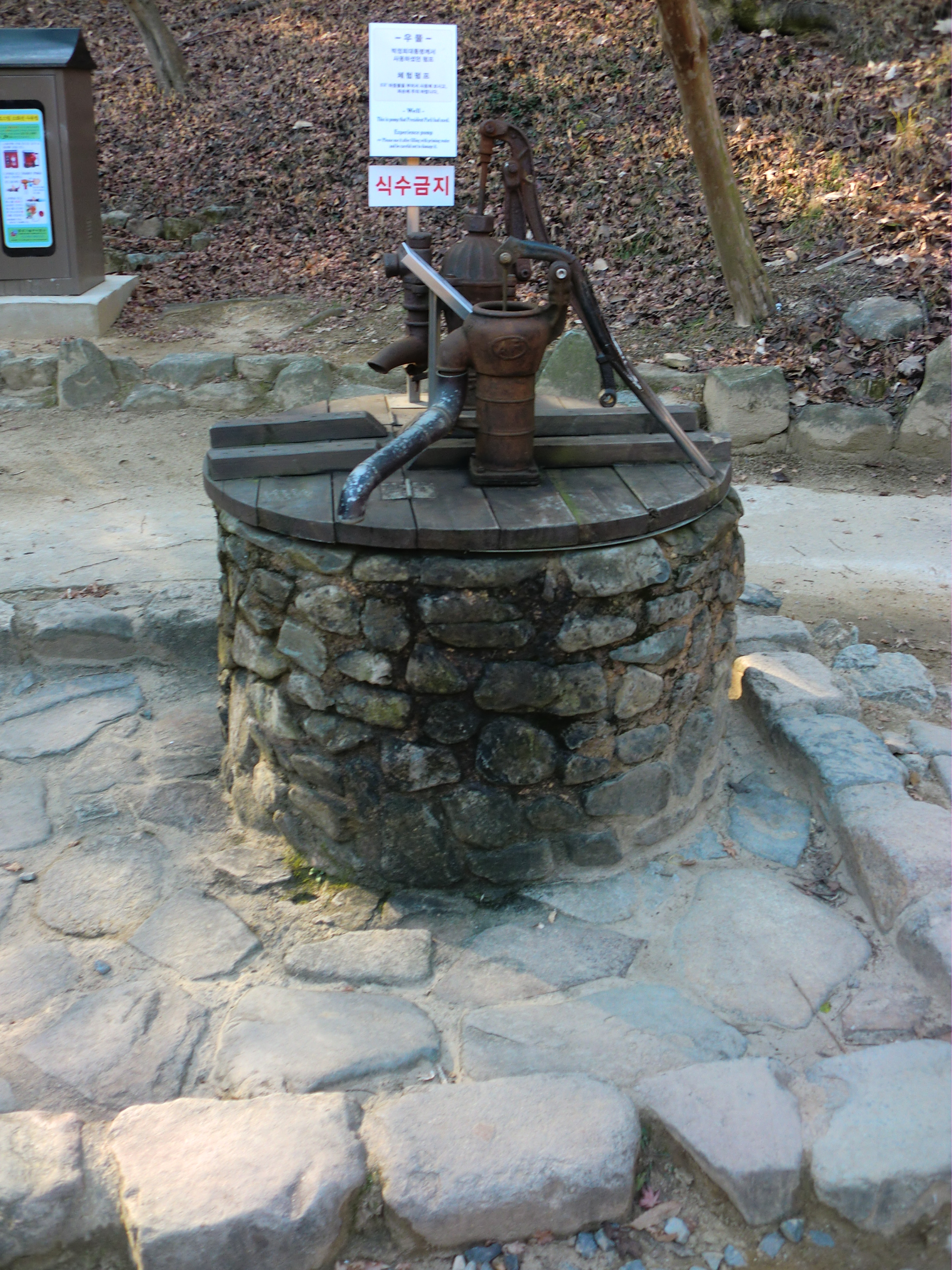
Well (with newer pump) that the Park family got water from (2016)

== See also ==
- Gumi Sangmo Church – The church Park attended during elementary school, near the birthplace
- Mangyongdae – Claimed birthplace of Kim Il Sung
