= List of indoor arenas in South Korea =

The following is a list of active indoor arenas in South Korea with a capacity of at least 3,000 spectators. Most of the arenas in this list have multiple sporting and non-sporting uses.

== Existing stadiums ==
Location	Arena	Date built	Capacity	Image
Anyang	Anyang Gymnasium	2000	6,690	
Busan	Sajik Arena	1985	14,099	
Changwon	Changwon Indoor Gymnasium	1996	6,000	
Changwon	Changwon Velodrome	2000	14,000	
Changwon	Masan Gymnasium	1980	5,000	
Cheonan	Ryu Gwansun Gymnasium	2001	6,000	
Daejeon	Choongmu Gymnasium	1970	6,000	
Gangneung	Catholic Kwandong University Gymnasium	2017	6,000	
Gangneung	Gangneung Gymnasium	1998	3,500	
Gangneung	Gangneung Hockey Center	2016	10,000	
Gangneung	Gangneung Ice Arena	2016	12,000	
Goyang	Goyang Gymnasium	2011	6,216	
Gapyeong-gun	Cheongshim World Peace Center	2012	16,979	
Gumi	Park Chung Hee Gymnasium	2001	6,277	
Incheon	Samsan World Gymnasium	2006	7,220	
Incheon	Gyeyang Gymnasium	2013	4,270	
Incheon	Inspire Arena	2019	15,000	
Jeonju	Jeonju Indoor Gymnasium	1973	4,730	
Seongnam	Sangmu Gymnasium	1986	5,000	
Seoul	Hanyang University Gymnasium	1986	8,000	
Seoul	Jamsil Arena	1979	11,069	
Seoul	Jamsil Students' Gymnasium	1976	7,500	
Seoul	Jangchung Arena	1963	4,507	
Seoul	Olympic Gymnastics Arena	1986	15,000	
Seoul	Olympic Handball Gymnasium	1986	5,003	
Seoul	Seoul Student Gymnaisium	1977	5,400	
Seoul	Seoul National University Gymnasium	1986	5,000	
Suwon	Suwon Gymnasium	1984	5,145	
Ulsan	Dongchun Gymnasium	2001	5,831	
Wonju	Wonju Sports Complex	2013	4,594	

== See also ==
- List of indoor arenas
- List of football stadiums in South Korea
- Lists of stadiums
