= Park Chung-hee Presidential Museum =

History museum in Gumi, South Korea

Coordinates: 36.09061°N 128.34894°E

- Established: September 28, 2021
- Location: Gumi, North Gyeongsang, South Korea
- Type: History museum
- Website: Homepage (in English)

Korean name
- Hangul: 박정희대통령역사자료관
- RR: Bak Jeonghui daetongnyeong yeoksa jaryogwan
- MR: Pak Chŏnghŭi taet'ongnyŏng yŏksa charyogwan

The Park Chung-hee Presidential Museum (Korean: 박정희대통령역사자료관) is a public history museum in Gumi, North Gyeongsang, South Korea. It is dedicated to the 1963–1979 President of South Korea, Park Chung Hee.

It first opened on September 28, 2021. It is located near Park's birthplace, which is now an exhibit. Park's daughter, former president Park Geun-hye, visited the museum for the first time on August 15, 2023.
