= Drassyllus depressus =

Conservation status
- Secure (NatureServe)

Scientific classification
- Kingdom: Animalia
- Phylum: Arthropoda
- Subphylum: Chelicerata
- Class: Arachnida
- Order: Araneae
- Infraorder: Araneomorphae
- Family: Gnaphosidae
- Genus: Drassyllus
- Species: D. depressus

Binomial name
- Drassyllus depressus (Emerton, 1890)

Synonyms
- Prosthesima depressa Emerton, 1890

Species of spider

Drassyllus depressus is a species of ground spider in the family Gnaphosidae. It is found in the United States and Canada.
