= Kang Yongseok =

South Korean lawyer (born 1969)

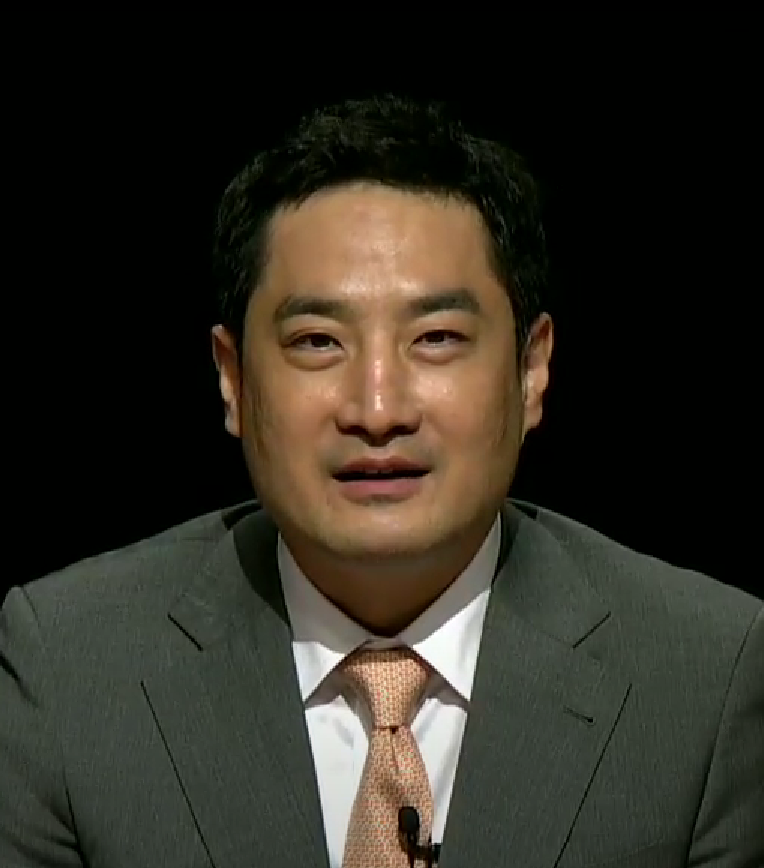
- Kang in 2014
- Born: 3 December 1969 (age 56); Jung District, Seoul, South Korea
- Occupations: Lawyer; TV personality
- Political party: Independent

Korean name
- Hangul: 강용석
- Hanja: 康容碩
- RR: Gang Yongseok
- MR: Kang Yongsŏk
- Website: blog.naver.com/equity1

Kang Yongseok (Korean: 강용석; born 3 December 1969) is a South Korean lawyer and a current right-wing media personality. Formerly a member of the far-right think tank Hover Lab, he is known for his criticism of politicians such as Ahn Cheol-soo. He has been subject to a number of controversies.

== Early life and education ==
- 1985–1988: Kyunggi High School
- 1988–1992: Seoul National University LL.B.
- 1996–1998: Seoul National University LL.M.
- 2001–2002: Harvard Law School LL.M.

== Career ==
=== Comments about female news anchors ===
On July 20, 2010, Kang made remarks to a group of female students at Yonsei University, stating "they should give everything they have" to become newsreaders, which the Korean press regarded as implying they should provide sexual favours to further their careers. He was removed from the Grand National Party in September 2010. In May of 2011, Kang received a sentence of 6 months as a result of a countersuit to a defamation claim.

=== 2011 Election problems ===
In the process of defending his Harvard law degree against false allegations that his Harvard degree was forged, Kang spoke out against the Mayor of Seoul, Park Won-soon, who was one of the loudest voices of the allegations. Some people have stated that this played a role in swaying the public opinion against Mayor Park.

=== Lawsuit against Choi Hyo-jong ===
In November 2011, Kang sued South Korean comedian Choi Hyo-jong for "disrespecting the National Assembly" in a skit in Gag Concert. Chung Doo-un protested against Kang's decision "that could potentially undermine the ruling Grand National Party". The lawsuit received widespread condemnation, including from comedian Kim Won-hyo, who protested against Kang's action on his Twitter account.

=== Television appearances ===
Kang was a frequent guest on several public TV shows including tvN's The Genius, and JTBC's Crime Scene. In 2015 Kang stepped down from all of his TV show appearances after being accused of having an affair with the blogger Dodomam, which she denied. The husband issued a lawsuit demanding $86,000 in damages.

=== Dodomam document forgery case ===
On Oct. 24, 2018, Judge Park Dae-san of the Seoul Central District Court sentenced Kang Yong-seok, who is suspected of forgery of private documents, to one year in prison and arrested in court. On the reason for the ruling, Judge Park Dae-san said, "Kang Yong-seok, as a lawyer, forgot his status and basic duties and conspired with Kim Mi-na, who is in an affair, to forge a private document. There is a great possibility of criticism. Kim's husband, Cho, suffered further from an affair with Kang's actions," the lawyer said. Kang is not reflecting on his wrongdoing at all, he added. Kang, meanwhile, was put on trial on charges of forging documents to drop a lawsuit filed by the husband of famous blogger Dodomam Kim Mi-na, who allegedly had an affair with him. And was acquitted.

== Election results ==
=== General elections ===
Year	Elections	Constituency	Political party	Votes (%)	Results
2004	17th National Assembly General Election	Mapo B (Seoul)	GNP	39,598 (39.04%)	Defeated (2nd)
2008	18th National Assembly General Election	Mapo B (Seoul)	GNP	36,447 (45.94%)	Won
2012	19th National Assembly General Election	Mapo B (Seoul)	Independent	4,583 (4.29%)	Defeated (3rd)

=== Local elections ===
==== Governor of Gyeonggi ====
Year	Elections	Constituency	Political party	Votes (%)	Remarks
2022	8th Iocal Election	Gyeonggi (Governoral Elections)	Independent	54,758 (0.95%)	Defeated (3rd)
