= Drassyllus niger =

Scientific classification
- Domain: Eukaryota
- Kingdom: Animalia
- Phylum: Arthropoda
- Subphylum: Chelicerata
- Class: Arachnida
- Order: Araneae
- Infraorder: Araneomorphae
- Family: Gnaphosidae
- Genus: Drassyllus
- Species: D. niger

Binomial name
- Drassyllus niger (Banks, 1896)

Synonyms
- Prosthesima transversa Emerton, 1911

Species of spider

Drassyllus niger is a species of ground spider in the family Gnaphosidae. It is found in the United States and Canada.
