= Hover Lab =

South Korean YouTube channel

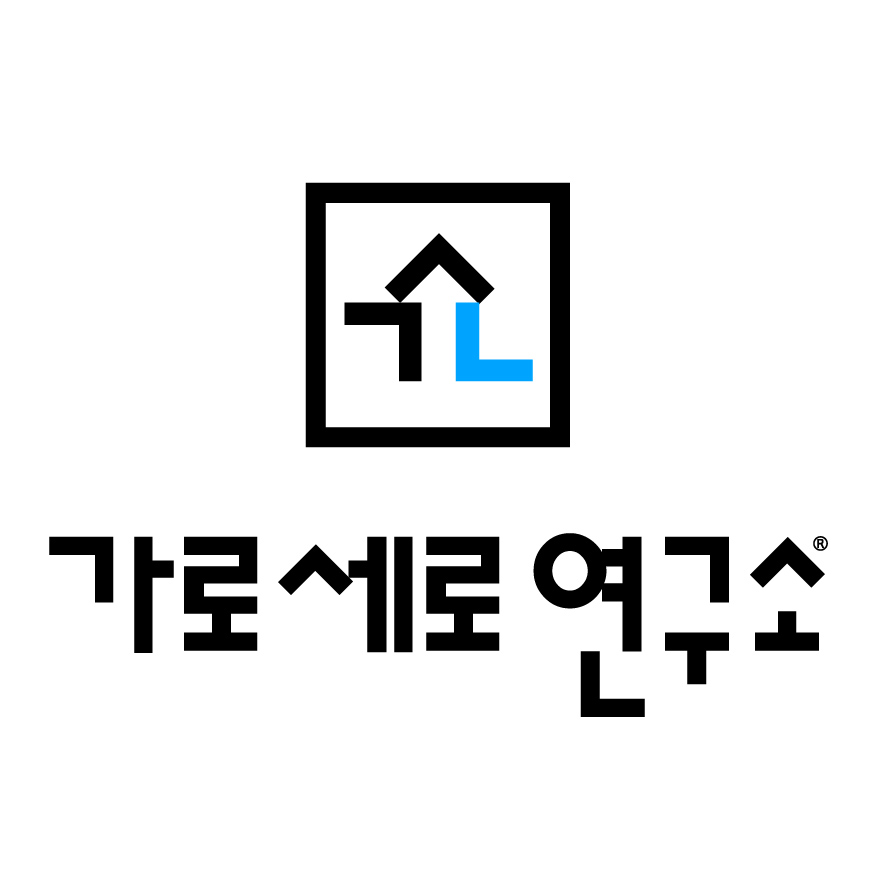
- Founded: August 2018; 8 years ago
- Founders: Kim Se-ui; Kang Yongseok

YouTube information
- Channel: Hover Lab
- Subscribers: 991,000
- Views: 170 million
- Last updated: May 23, 2026

Korean name
- Hangul: 가로세로연구소
- RR: Garosero yeonguso
- MR: Karosero yŏn'guso
- Website: hoverlab2018.com

Hover Lab, (Note: YouTube channel uses this spelling, capitalization, and spacing. Sometimes stylized as HoverLab.) also known as Garo Sero Research Institute (Korean: 가로세로연구소 (Note: Sometimes abbreviated in Korean as Gaseyeon (가세연).)), is a South Korean YouTube channel and think tank.

Hover Lab is widely considered to promote far-right political views, and has promoted misleading or fabricated information about celebrities, politicians, and politics on a number of occasions. It and its members have been found liable or guilty of a number of defamation lawsuits and criminal complaints. For example, its members lost cases brought by current South Korean president Lee Jae Myung and politician Cho Kuk. The organization is also currently facing several lawsuits and complaints, including several from YouTuber Tzuyang and actor Kim Soo-hyun.

The organization was founded by reporter Kim Se-ui and lawyer and politician Kang Yongseok. Kang's law license was suspended until 2030 after he was convicted of violating election law. Journalist Kim Yong-ho was also a long-time contributor, until 2023, when he committed suicide after being convicted of sexual assault.

== History ==
=== Establishment ===
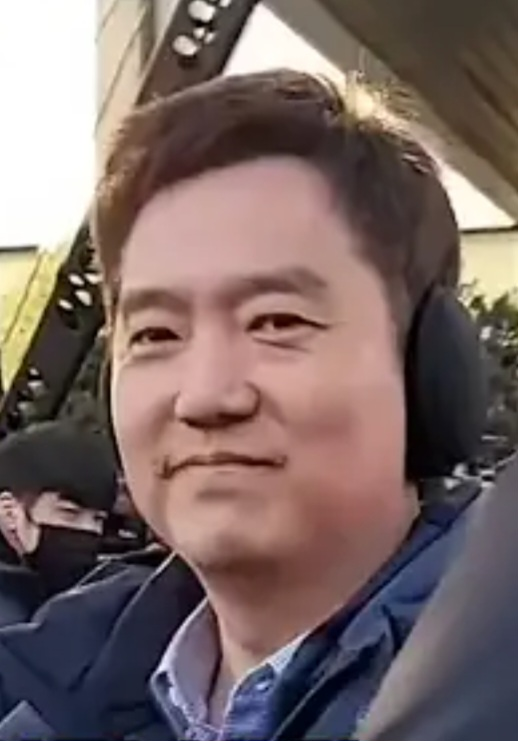
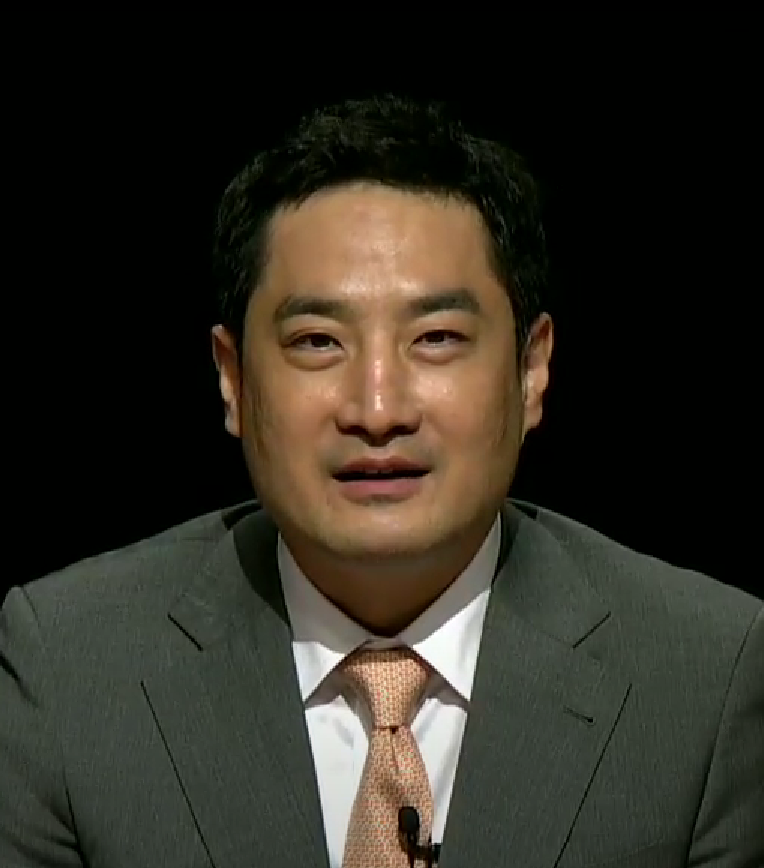
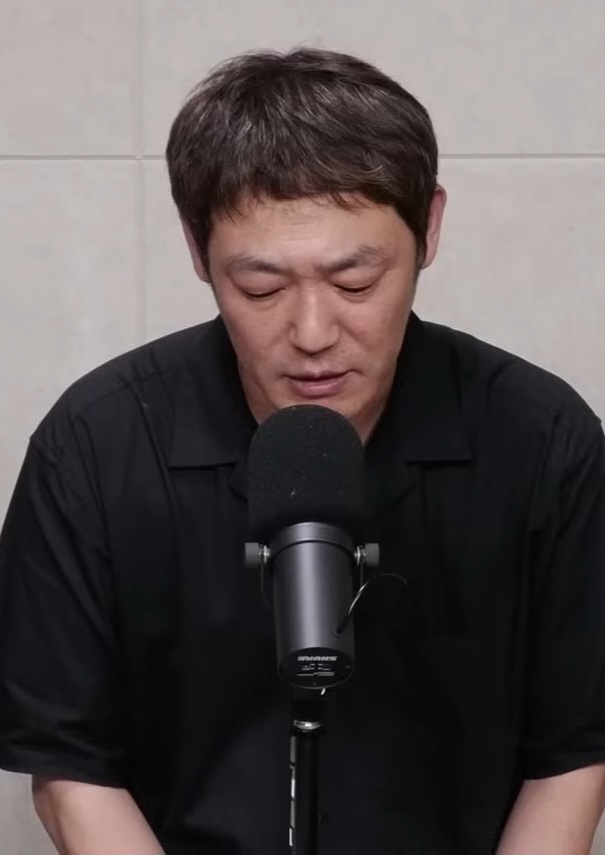
Kim Se-ui (left) and Kang Yongseok (middle), as well as long-time contributor Kim Yong-ho (right)

Hover Lab was established in August 2018 by reporter Kim Se-ui and lawyer Kang Yongseok.

Kim was formerly a reporter at Munhwa Broadcasting Corporation (MBC). According to a Media Today report, Kim had once been the chairman of the MBC labor union, but had become increasingly controversial due to his far-right leanings and remarks. Near the end of his time there, he was subject to an internal company investigation. Amidst the investigation, he quit the company and announced that he would found Hover Lab. Months after his departure, MBC announced that it had concluded Kim had falsified many interviews he published during his time at MBC.

Kang is a lawyer (law license currently suspended) and politician. While he was elected to the National Assembly in 2008, he was expelled from the Grand National Party in 2010 after making remarks to a female student that were viewed as sexual harassment. He tried to rejoin that party (then called "Saenuri Party") in 2016, but was rejected.

Kim and Kang had known each other for years prior and shared many political views; they vowed to create an organization that would rejuvenate South Korea's right wing.

Some time afterwards, entertainment journalist Kim Yong-ho joined the channel and became a regular.

=== Early activities ===
In October 2018, Kang was sentenced to one year in prison for forging documents in an unrelated case. Kim Se-ui criticized the ruling and vowed to continue broadcasting while Kang served his sentence.

By 2019, the Hover Lab YouTube channel had become one of the most significant conservative channels in the country. Hover Lab had the highest YouTube super chat (donation) revenues of any channel in the world in June 2020. Also, into the early 2020s, YouTube began to play a critical role in South Korean politics, which Hover Lab benefitted greatly from.

Hover Lab was a cocreator of the 2021 biographical musical theater production Musical Park Chung Hee. The musical celebrates the life of South Korean leader Park Chung Hee, whom is a controversial but popular figure among South Korean conservatives.

On September 7, 2021, Kang and the two Kims were arrested for not complying with questionings pertaining to 10 lawsuits they were the targets of. While Kim Yong-ho was arrested quickly, the other two refused to comply with police and were only arrested after a ten-hour standoff.

In January 2022, Hover Lab's YouTube channel was suspended for one week for violating the platform's COVID-19 misinformation policies. This was in relation to a January 12 video by Hover Lab in which they forwarded vaccine skepticism. After a broadcast in which they attempted to ascertain medical information about politician Cho Kuk's daughter, YouTube deemed the activity harassment and suspended the channel in May 2022 for a week and blocked monetization for three months thereafter.

=== Kang Yongseok departure and Kim Yong-ho suicide ===
By mid-2022, the group was experiencing financial difficulties, and a feud between Kim Se-ui and Kang Yongseok became publicly visible. Around this time, Kang had lowered his involvement in the organization while running to become governor of Gyeonggi Province. Kang unsuccessfully ran as a competitor to the People Power Party candidate Kim Eun-hye, a fellow conservative, in the 2022 election. He was accused of causing the spoiler effect because he received more votes than the margin by which Kim Eun-hye lost by, which led to conservative backlash against Kang and Hover Lab. Due to this feud, Kang began broadcasting on his own channel, and Kim Se-ui continued to run Hover Lab.

On December 7, 2022, Kim announced that he had filed a criminal complaint against Kang. He alleged, among other claims, that Kang had changed the distribution of their company shares without his consent in 2019.

Kim Yong-ho committed suicide on October 13, 2023, a day after he was convicted for a sexual assault case unrelated to his Hover Lab activities. While Kang expressed sympathy for Kim Yong-ho's death, Kim Se-ui disavowed Kim Yong-ho as a criminal that extorted money from others. Kim Se-ui also called for the police to continue investigating Kang.

=== Recent activities ===
Hover Lab has been a longtime supporter of former president Yoon Suk Yeol. After Yoon declared martial law in December 2024, Hover Lab hosted a rally in defense of Yoon and protested Yoon's impeachment. Hover Lab also promoted conspiracy theories about Chinese agents infiltrating the pro-impeachment rallies.

In February 2026, Hover Lab and Kim Se-ui received approval to seize the home of former conservative president Park Geun-hye after she failed to repay a debt.

== Legal disputes ==
=== Kang Gi-jung case ===
In an October 2019 video, Hover Lab cited politician Kang Gi-jung as having shared some information pertaining to the 2019 Cho Kuk scandal, but Kang denied this and filed a defamation suit. Kang eventually won the suit in July 2022, and the two Kims and Kang of Hover Lab were made to pay restitution.

=== Kim Gun-mo case ===
On December 8, 2019, Hover Lab promoted an allegation by a woman who claimed that she had been raped by famous singer Kim Gun-mo. Kim Gun-mo denied the charges and filed a lawsuit against the woman. The allegations severely affected Kim's career. In 2022, the Seoul High Prosecutors' Office dismissed the rape charge against Kim Gun-mo. In December 2025, Kang issued a public apology to Kim Gun-mo.

=== Cho Won case ===
In an August 22, 2019 video, Hover Lab alleged that politician Cho Kuk's son Cho Won (조원) had sexually harassed a female student but had his mother, Jeong Gyeong-sim (정경심), a professor at Dongyang University, manipulate the scenario to portray her son as being bullied. In response, in August 2020, Cho Kuk filed a lawsuit and complaint to the police against Kang Yongseok and Kim Se-ui. In January 2025, the Supreme Court found Kang and Kim liable in the lawsuit, and ordered them to pay restitution to the Cho family. The complaint to police was forwarded to prosecutors in 2022. On May 1, 2026, Kang and Kim were indicted by police without detention.

=== Outdoor interview case ===
A 2020 outdoor interview that Kang and Kim held with 14 conservative candidates was found to be in violation of election law, as the interview took place outdoors (they are required to take place indoors) and three days prior to the campaign season. After several trials, in August 2024 the Supreme Court ruled that Kang and Kim were to each pay fines of ₩2 million.

=== Lee Jae Myung case ===
On November 9, 2021, Kim Se-ui and Kang Yongseok alleged that then presidential candidate Lee Jae Myung had had a child from an extramarital affair, that he had had a physical altercation with his wife Kim Hea Kyung, and that he had been in a juvenile detention facility. Lee Jae Myung sued Hover Lab on grounds of defamation. In August 2025, Kim and Kang were found liable for falsifying the extramarital affair claim and ordered to pay ₩7 million (US$5,000) and ₩10 million (US$7,200) respectively as restitution. The remaining two claims were deemed to be uncertain enough to not be outright falsehoods. In December 2025, the juvenile detention facility claim was also determined to be misleading, and Kang's sentence was increased to one year in prison, suspended for two years, and 40 hours of community service.

=== Lee Jun-seok case ===
In December 2021, Hover Lab alleged that politician Lee Jun-seok had received sexual favors as bribes in 2013. Lee denied the allegations and announced that he would pursue legal action against Hover Lab. In September 2022, police announced that Lee would not be investigated, as the seven-year statute of limitations had expired. However, it did announce that Lee would be investigated over whether he made false accusations against Hover Lab. Ultimately, this scandal led to Lee being suspended from the People Power Party from July 2022 to November 2023.

=== Journalist organizations case ===
On January 20, 2022, the organizations Citizens' Coalition for Democratic Media, National Union of Media Workers, and Journalists Association of Korea held a press conference in which they urged Google Korea to regulate the activities of organizations they felt were harmful on Google platforms, including Hover Lab. In response, Hover Lab alleged defamation and filed a lawsuit against several officials of those organizations. The lawsuit was dismissed in February 2025.

=== Tzuyang case ===
In July 2024, YouTuber Tzuyang filed a complaint against Kim Se-ui and Hover Lab for defamation, intimidation, and coercion relating to videos posted about her on the Hover Lab channel. After initially declining to pursue an investigation, the prosecution reversed the decision after Tzuyang's legal team filed an objection. In April 2025, Hover Lab was ordered to take down videos that mentioned Tzuyang. As of March 2026, the case is still ongoing.

=== Kim Soo-hyun and Kim Sae-ron case ===
Following the 2025 death of celebrity Kim Sae-ron, in March 2025, Kim Sae-ron's family and Hover Lab alleged that she had been in a sexual relationship with actor Kim Soo-hyun even while Sae-ron had been underage. This led to widespread public and professional backlash against Kim Soo-hyun. Soo-hyun disputed the claim and filed a lawsuit against Hover Lab and Sae-ron's family.

On April 23, 2025, Hover Lab was ordered by the Seoul Central District Court to stop discussing Kim Soo-hyun in their videos. Hover Lab appealed the order, but the appeal was denied. In June 2025, police interrupted a Hover Lab livestream as Kim Se-ui was about to discuss Kim Soo-hyun and warned him not to violate the order again.

Kim Se-ui also alleged that Kim Soo-hyun had Seoul Broadcasting System (SBS) reporter Kang Gyeong-yun (강경윤) fly to the United States to intimidate an alleged whistleblower on Kim Sae-ron's and Kim Soo-hyun's supposed relationship. The alleged whistleblower shared images of an injury they claimed to have received during the process, but Kim Soo-hyun's legal team countered that the image was "easily found through an internet search". In May 2025, Kang Gyeong-yun released her immigration records, which showed she had not left South Korea, and filed a criminal complaint against Kim Se-ui.

On May 22, 2026, the Gangnam Police Station announced that it had concluded Hover Lab's supposed evidence of Kim Soo-hyun having dated Kim Sae-ron while underage was fabricated, and that it was seeking an arrest warrant for Kim Se-ui.
