= Sarangchae =

Area of traditional Korean house for men

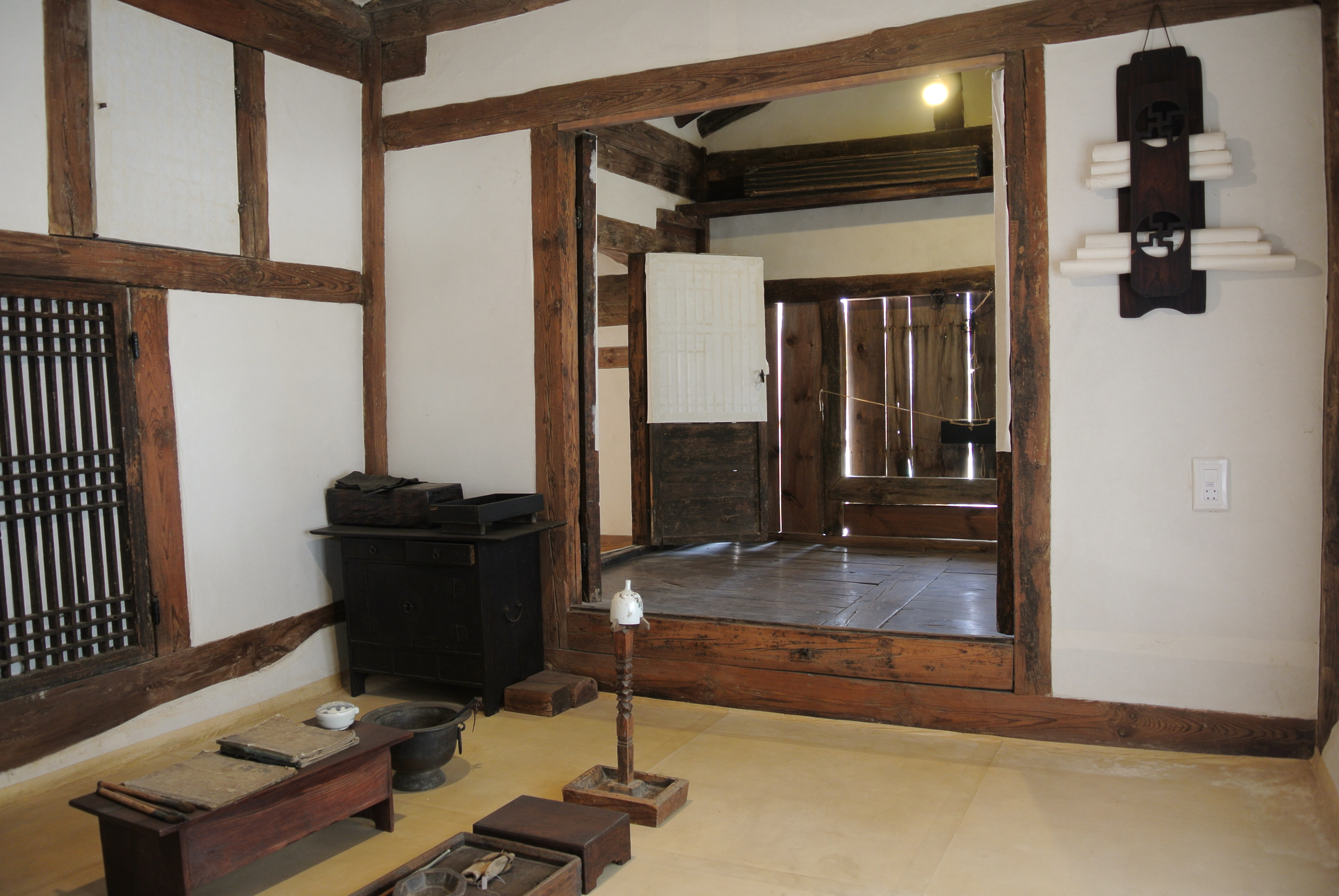
- A study in a hanok in the National Folk Museum of Korea. Likely a sarangbang.

Korean name
- Hangul: 사랑채
- Hanja: 舍廊채
- RR: sarangchae
- MR: sarangch'ae

Sarangbang
- Hangul: 사랑방
- Hanja: 舍廊房
- RR: sarangbang
- MR: sarangbang

A sarangchae (Korean: 사랑채; Hanja: 舍廊채) is a section of a Korean traditional house (hanok) that is generally reserved for men and guests. It can be composed of a number of rooms and elements, including notably the sarangbang (사랑방). In smaller homes, the sarangchae may just consist of a single sarangbang, in which case they are one and the same.

The anchae and anbang are the female-oriented counterparts. They are more private sections of the house exclusive to women (and prohibited to especially male guests), from which they cook, store precious items away from guests, and manage the household.

These gendered spaces first emerged around the Joseon period, following a Confucian ideal of strict separation of genders. They became widespread during that period, even in the countryside. However, they are now uncommon.

== Description ==
=== Function ===
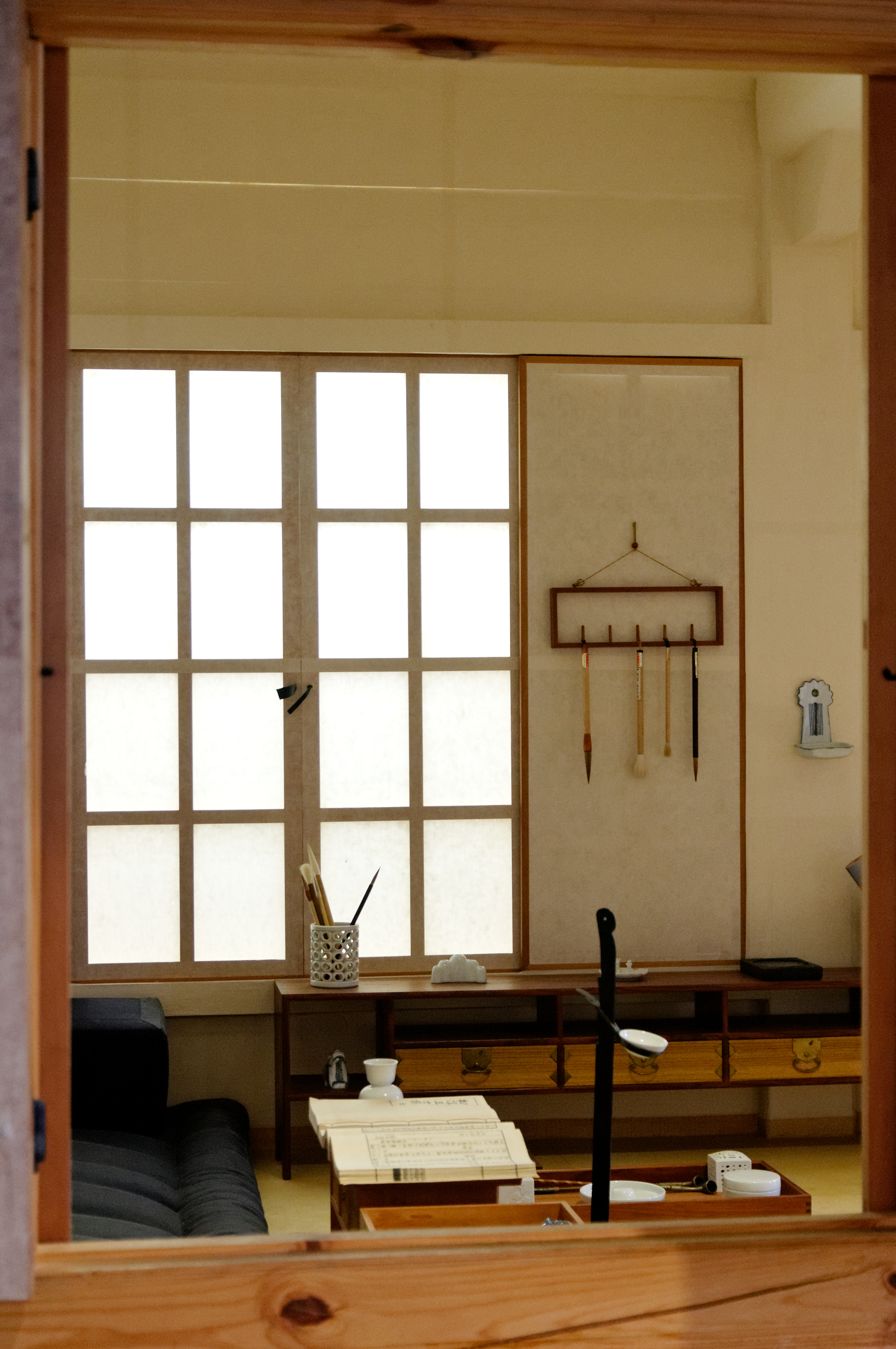
A recreation of a sarangbang in the British Museum (2000)

A sarangchae is a section of the house where men can sleep, study, and entertain guests. However, in some particularly large houses, guests could be entertained in yet another structure, with outsiders being prohibited entry into the sarangchae. If it contained multiple rooms, fathers usually slept in a separate room from their sons, although the son could share a room with their grandfather.

Women, including the female head of household and daughters-in-law, were generally forbidden from entering it. How strictly the entry ban was enforced varied by household and by time, although it was not uncommon for women in noble families to never once enter a sarangchae for their entire lives.

However, especially for the rural poor with small houses, the sarangchae often served other general purposes, like being a workshop or a space for storing equipment.

=== Composition ===
Depending on the size of the house, sarangchaes can either be connected to or disconnected from the rest of the house. Within a house, it is generally placed closer to the main entrance, in order to accommodate the entry of guests. It can either have or be separated from the anchae by a larger open space called a taech'ŏng or taech'ŏngmaru (대청(마루); 大廳(마루); lit. 'large floor').

A sarangchae contains one or more rooms, but always contains a sarangbang. If the sarangbang is the only room, it performs all the functions of the sarangchae.

=== Examples ===
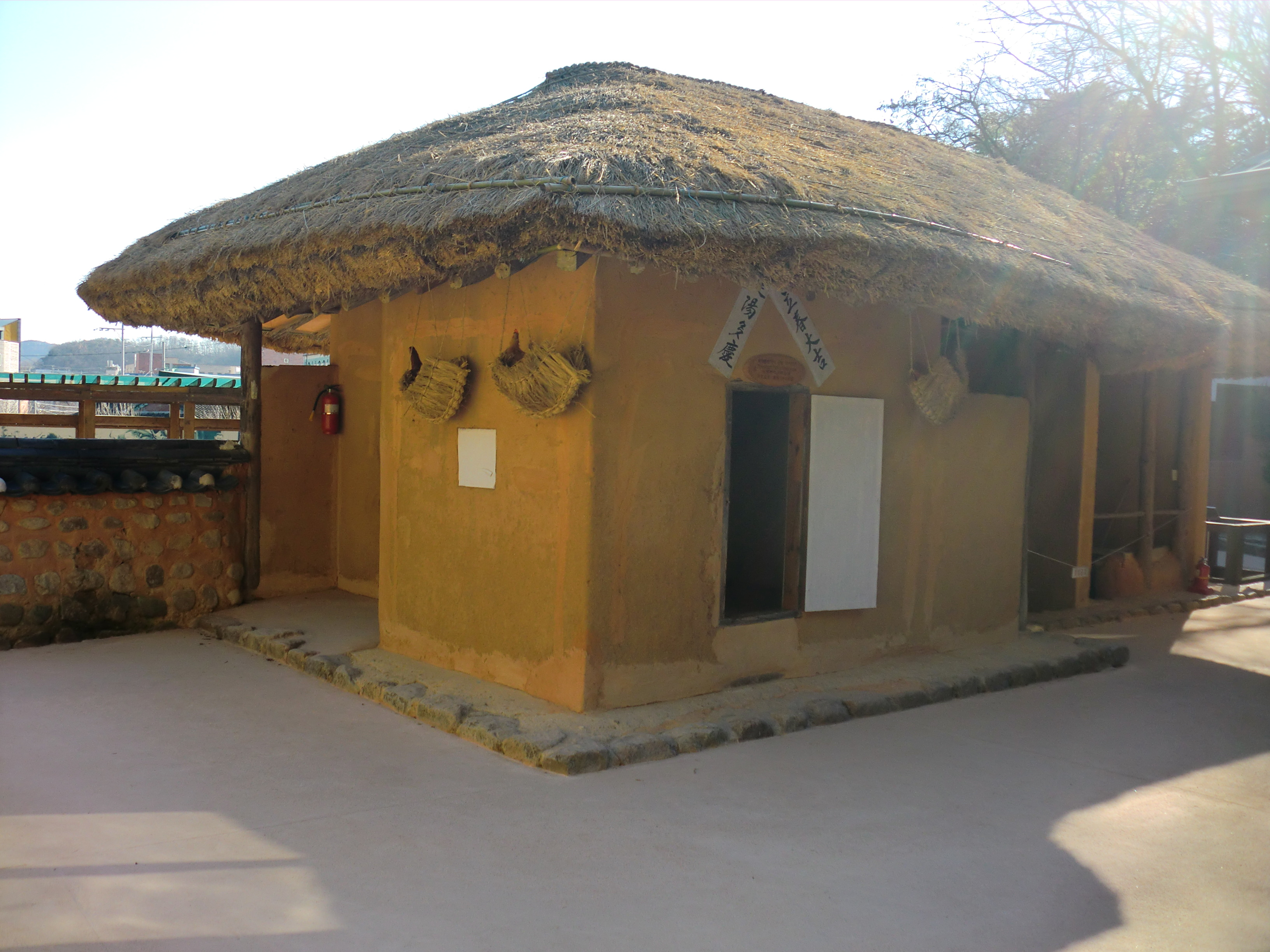
The sarangchae where Park Chung Hee was born (2016)

The birthplace of President Park Chung Hee was constructed around either 1900 or 1916, and has a separate sarangchae that is placed closer to the main entry. It has several small rooms.

The Blue House ("Cheongwadae"), the former presidential palace of South Korea, has a sarangchae that is external to the rest of the complex. In the spirit of sarangchaes, it was open to the public even before the Blue House was vacated and itself turned into a museum. It shows the history of the main building and the Korean presidency.

== History ==
Confucianism became widespread in Korea during the Joseon period (1392–1894). This is also when sarangchaes developed. The concept reflected the prioritization of Confucianist ideals. Confucianism dictates a strict separation of genders, with activities and duties mandated to each gender. It considered studying and poetry as virtues. Thus, the sarangchae and anchae physically oriented the home into following these ideals.

== See also ==
- Anchae
- Hanok
