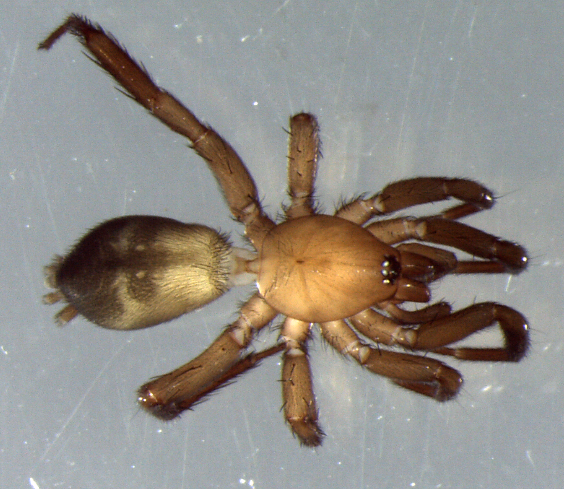
- Female Drassyllus aprilinus

Scientific classification
- Kingdom: Animalia
- Phylum: Arthropoda
- Subphylum: Chelicerata
- Class: Arachnida
- Order: Araneae
- Infraorder: Araneomorphae
- Family: Gnaphosidae
- Genus: Drassyllus
- Species: D. aprilinus

Binomial name
- Drassyllus aprilinus (Banks, 1904)

Synonyms
- Zelotes aprilinus Banks, 1904; Drassyllus ostegae Chamberlin, 1936; Drassyllus osteganus Bonnet, 1956

= Drassyllus aprilinus =

Species of spider

Drassyllus aprilinus is a species of ground spider in the family Gnaphosidae. It is found in the eastern United States and Mexico. While females do have a distinct patterning on the abdomen, both males and females are best identified through collecting specimens and inspecting their genitalia. Like many other members of its family, it is found near to the ground, often under leaf litter or stones. It is most strongly associated with forested habitats, where it has been found in oak-hickory, pine, sand-pine, and beech-magnolia forests, as well as pecan and citrus groves. Adult males and females are present throughout the year.

== Taxonomy ==
Drassyllus aprilinus was first described as Zelotes aprilinus by Nathan Banks in 1904, from a female specimen collected near Chevy Chase, Maryland. It was later transferred to Drassyllus by Ralph Vary Chamberlin, who included it as one of the first listed species in the genus in 1922. The first male Drassyllus aprilinus were described in 1936, mistakenly identified as the male of Drassyllus frigidus and newly described as the species Drassyllus ostegae (now synonymized with Drassyllus aprilinus).

== Description ==
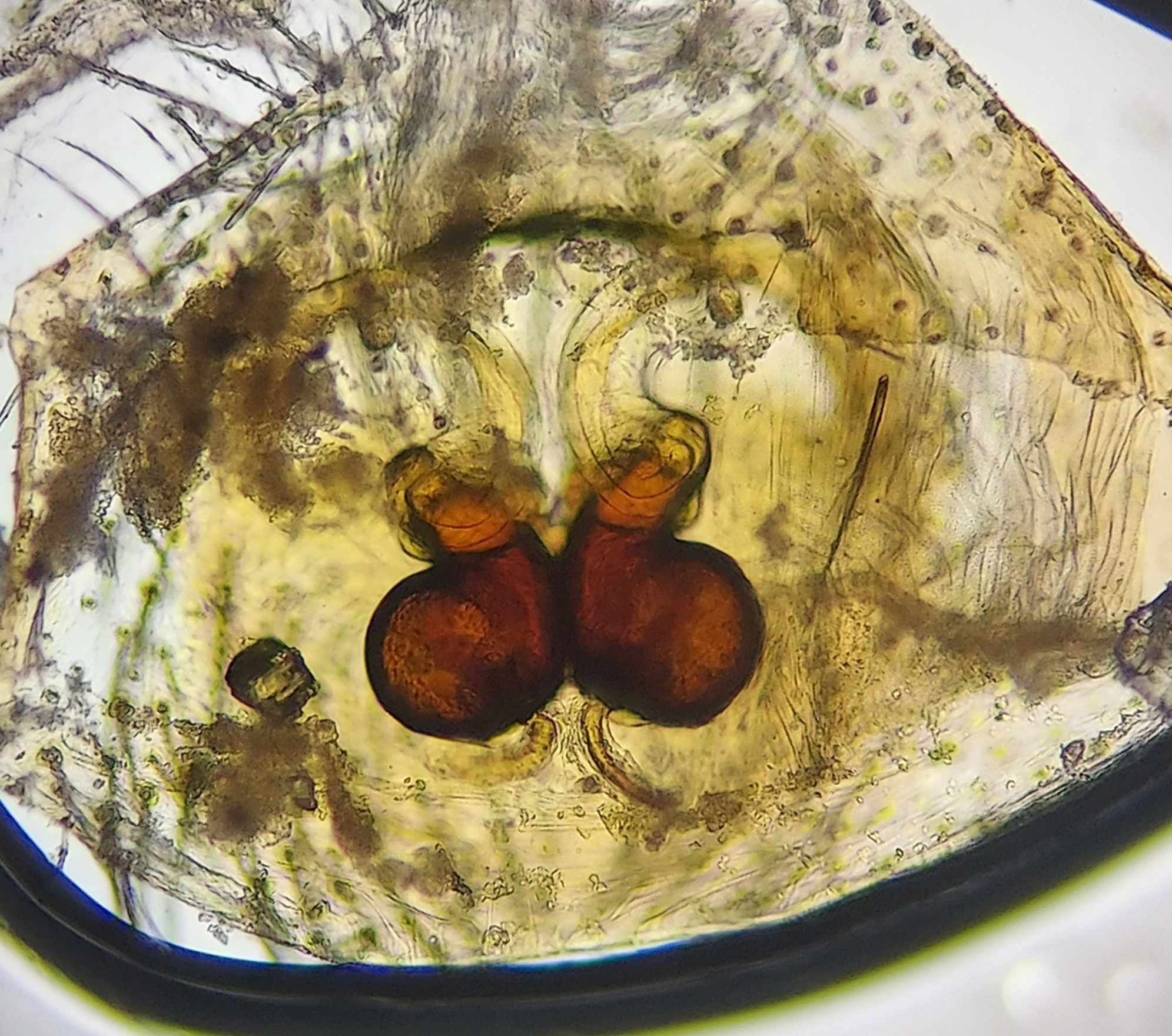
Dissected epigynum of Drassyllus aprilinus

Drassyllus aprilinus is a moderately-sized spider, with males averaging 3.86 mm in length and females 4.50 mm in length. In females the cephalothorax is yellowish-brown, with red-brown legs. The abdomen is dark with a large black spot covering the posterior half. The spot consistently includes a "crosshair" shape slightly behind the midpoint of the abdomen, with two small, white spots on the left and right arms of the shape. The underside is pale, except for a blackish "U" mark on the underside of the abdomen. Male Drassyllus aprilinus lack the distinctive markings of the female and mainly appear reddish yellow across most of the body.

Drassyllus aprilinus can most easily be identified through inspection of the genitalia. Males can be identified by the median projection at the tip of the terminal apophysis, and females can be identified by the almost invisible median plate of the epigynum.
