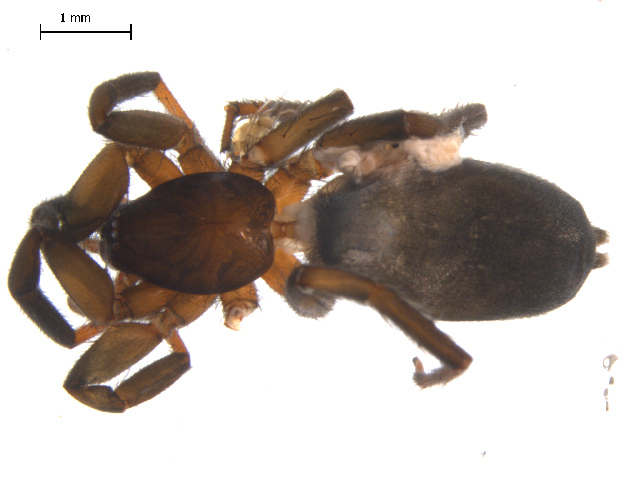

Scientific classification
- Domain: Eukaryota
- Kingdom: Animalia
- Phylum: Arthropoda
- Subphylum: Chelicerata
- Class: Arachnida
- Order: Araneae
- Infraorder: Araneomorphae
- Family: Gnaphosidae
- Genus: Drassyllus
- Species: D. insularis

Binomial name
- Drassyllus insularis (Banks, 1900)

Synonyms
- Callilepis insularis Banks, 1900; Drassyllus apachus Chamberlin, 1922; Drassyllus empiricus Chamberlin, 1924; Drassyllus monteriensis Schenkel, 1950; Drassyllus rationalis Chamberlin, 1924; Zelotes irritans Chamberlin, 1919

= Drassyllus insularis =

Species of spider

Drassyllus insularis is a species of ground spider in the family Gnaphosidae. It is found in North America.
