= Drassyllus covensis =

Scientific classification
- Kingdom: Animalia
- Phylum: Arthropoda
- Subphylum: Chelicerata
- Class: Arachnida
- Order: Araneae
- Infraorder: Araneomorphae
- Family: Gnaphosidae
- Genus: Drassyllus
- Species: D. covensis

Binomial name
- Drassyllus covensis Exline, 1962

Species of spider

Drassyllus covensis is a species of ground spider in the family Gnaphosidae. It is found in the United States.
