= Parkchunghee-ro =

Road in Gumi, South Korea

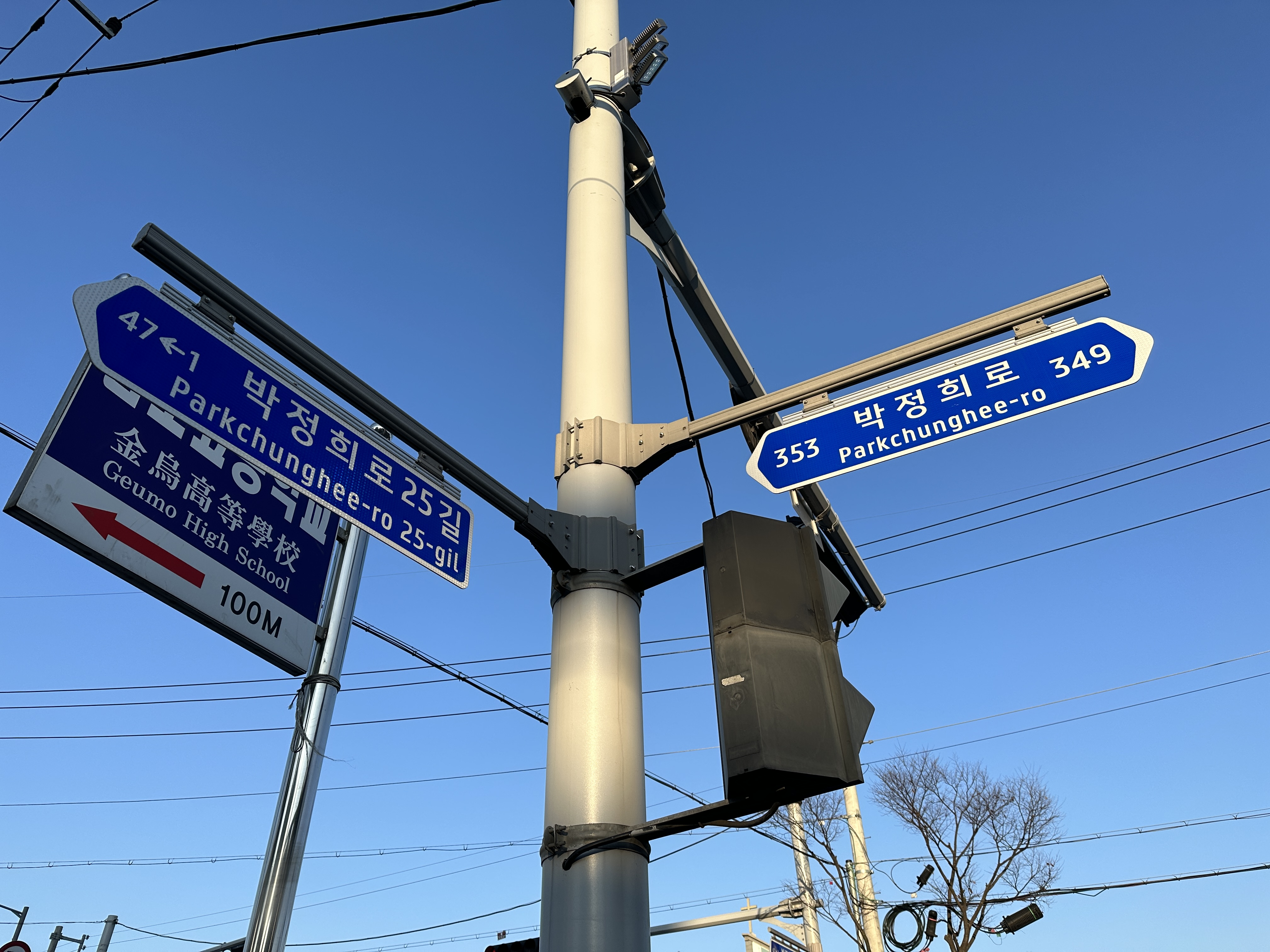

Route information
- Length: 6.2 km (3.9 mi)

Location
- Country: South Korea
- Major cities: Gumi

Highway system
- Highway systems of South Korea; Expressways; National; Local

Parkchunghee-ro (Korean: 박정희로; Hanja: 朴正熙路) is a road in Gumi, North Gyeongsang Province, South Korea. It begins in Otae-dong and extends for around 6.2 km (3.9 mi) until it reaches Songjeong-dong. It is named for Park Chung Hee, president of South Korea from 1962 to 1979. It received its name on July 31, 2007, with the justification that it was near Park's birthplace. This decision was met with some controversy, as Park was a military dictator with a controversial track record.
