= Anchae =

Area of traditional Korean house for women

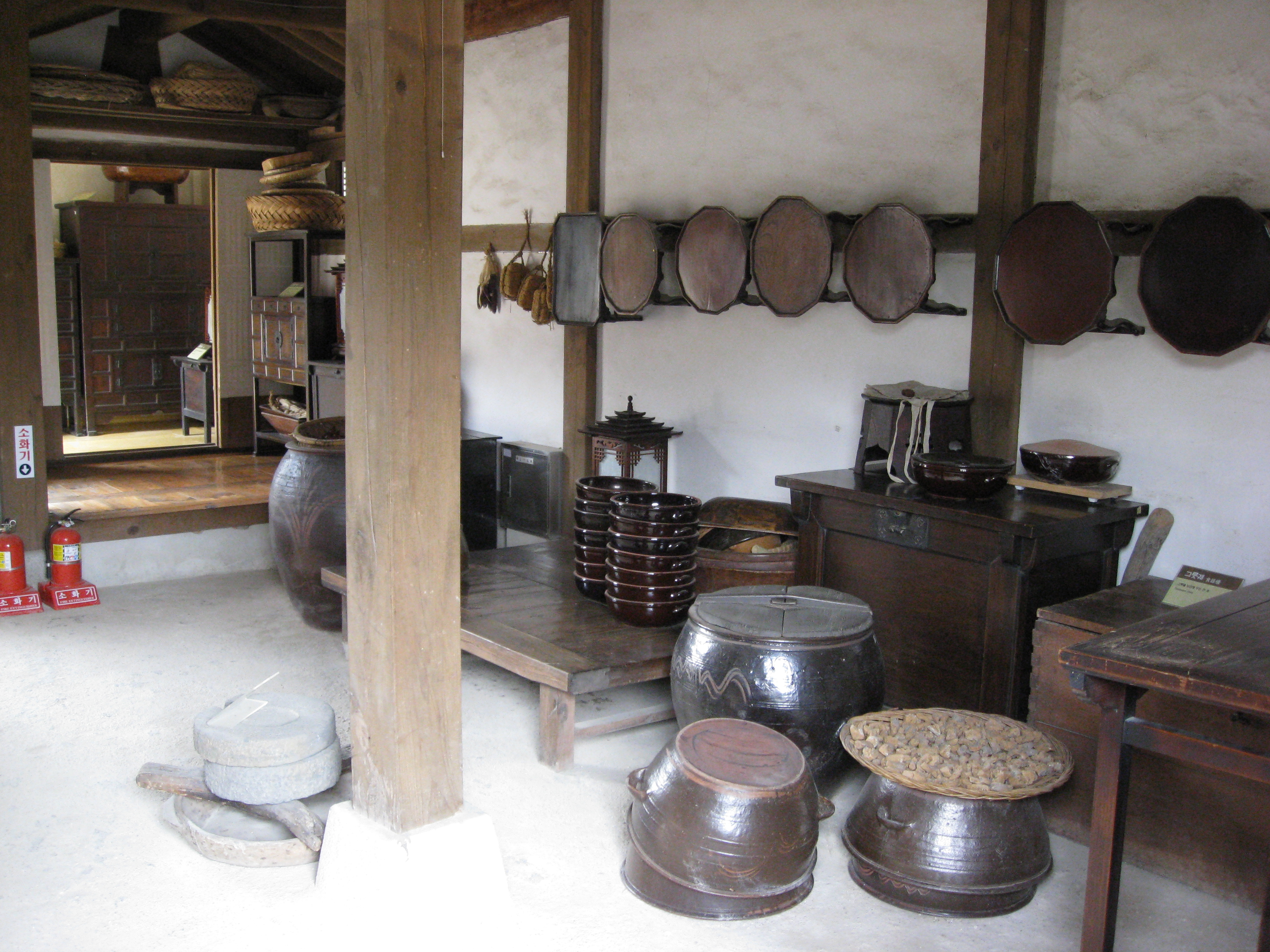
- A kitchen area, usually part of the anchae

Korean name
- Hangul: 안채
- RR: anchae
- MR: anch'ae

Anbang
- Hangul: 안방
- Hanja: 안房
- RR: anbang
- MR: anpang

An anchae (Korean: 안채) is a section of a Korean traditional house (hanok) that is reserved for women of the household. It can be composed of a number of rooms with different functions, including notably the anbang (안방; lit. inner room), the innermost room reserved for the female head of the household. In smaller homes, the anchae may consist of just a single anbang and a kitchen.

The sarangchae and sarangbang are the male-oriented counterparts, and could be either connected to the anchae or anbang, or be a separate building altogether.

Guests (especially male guests) were prohibited from entering the anchae, and were instead generally hosted in the sarangchae. Due to this, precious items were usually stored in the anchae, as guests were less likely to have access to the space. However, the male head of the household and his immediate descendants were allowed into the anbang. The head couple was generally expected to sleep separately in their respective rooms, however.

These gendered spaces first emerged around the Joseon period, following a Confucian ideal of strict separation of genders. They became widespread during that period, even in the countryside. However, they are now uncommon.

== Description ==
The anchae was considered the central or main building of the household, and was generally larger than the sarangchae. It was designed to facilitate the role of women in managing the household.

The anchae would also include other rooms such as the sadangchae, or family shrine; the bueok, or kitchen, which was commonly attached to the front of the anbang; the daecheong, a large wood-floored hall that connected the anbang to other rooms and functioned as both a pantry and a family gathering place; and various rooms for other female family members besides the head of the household. Next to the anchae, there was typically a courtyard to separate it from the sarangchae and provide a neutral space.

=== The anbang ===
The anbang was the innermost room of the anchae, and often placed further away from the main entrance of the house. The floor of the room was covered with laminate paper covered with bean oil (장판지마감), or a reed mat covering the soil floor of the ondol (heated floors). There may also be doors leading to the attic on the front part of the kitchen, and the lower part of the floor is covered with a thin blanket.

On the side of the room or the place farthest away from the heater, cabinets were placed. Cloth hangers were placed on corners of the rooms, and seats were placed for the comfort of the owner. Other furniture, such as desks, may also be present. During winter, a brazier was placed on the center of the room. Frequently, hot iron used for sewing was heated up in the brazier. Folding screens were placed either around the mattress or the windows to keep out the cold. Curtains were also used to stop the cold. On a part of the room, a portable lantern may be placed to be used as a nightlight.

The four walls are all covered in wallpaper. Upper class houses have special wallpapers on the walls. The ceiling is usually covered with a paper wallpaper (종이반자), though there are instances in which the rafters are left exposed. The first layer of the ceiling is covered with scrap paper, the second layer with thicker paper, and the last layer was covered in colored paper from the five colors of the rainbow.

If a new couple became the head of the household, the previous female head would move to another room and transfer the anbang to the new bride.

== History ==
The concept of anchaes and sarangchaes developed during the Joseon period. The separation of spaces went from loose in the early Joseon period to strict by the end. There are early Joseon records of a space for males (sarang) in the house. The remaining portion of the house, called the jeongchim (정침; 正寢), was not necessarily exclusively for females, but was shared by the couple. Both partners slept in the jeongchim.

The composition of the house changed after the 1592–1598 Japanese invasions of Korea. Ancestor worship became much more widespread, with stricter rules around its rituals, many of which were based on gender. Memorial shrines to ancestors (가묘; 家廟), which had once been external to the house (and previously rarely built by commoners), became commonplace within the household. Spaces that had once been used for entertaining extended family and guests became converted into locations for jesa (ancestor worship rituals). These spaces eventually coalesced into the sarangchae by the end of the 18th century, with the remaining nuclear family–oriented spaces becoming the anchae.

== See also ==
- Korean Confucianism
- History of women in Korea
