= Drassyllus lepidus =

Scientific classification
- Domain: Eukaryota
- Kingdom: Animalia
- Phylum: Arthropoda
- Subphylum: Chelicerata
- Class: Arachnida
- Order: Araneae
- Infraorder: Araneomorphae
- Family: Gnaphosidae
- Genus: Drassyllus
- Species: D. lepidus

Binomial name
- Drassyllus lepidus (Banks, 1899)

Species of spider

Drassyllus lepidus is a spider in the family Gnaphosidae ("ground spiders"), in the infraorder Araneomorphae ("true spiders"). The distribution range of Drassyllus lepidus includes the US and Mexico.
