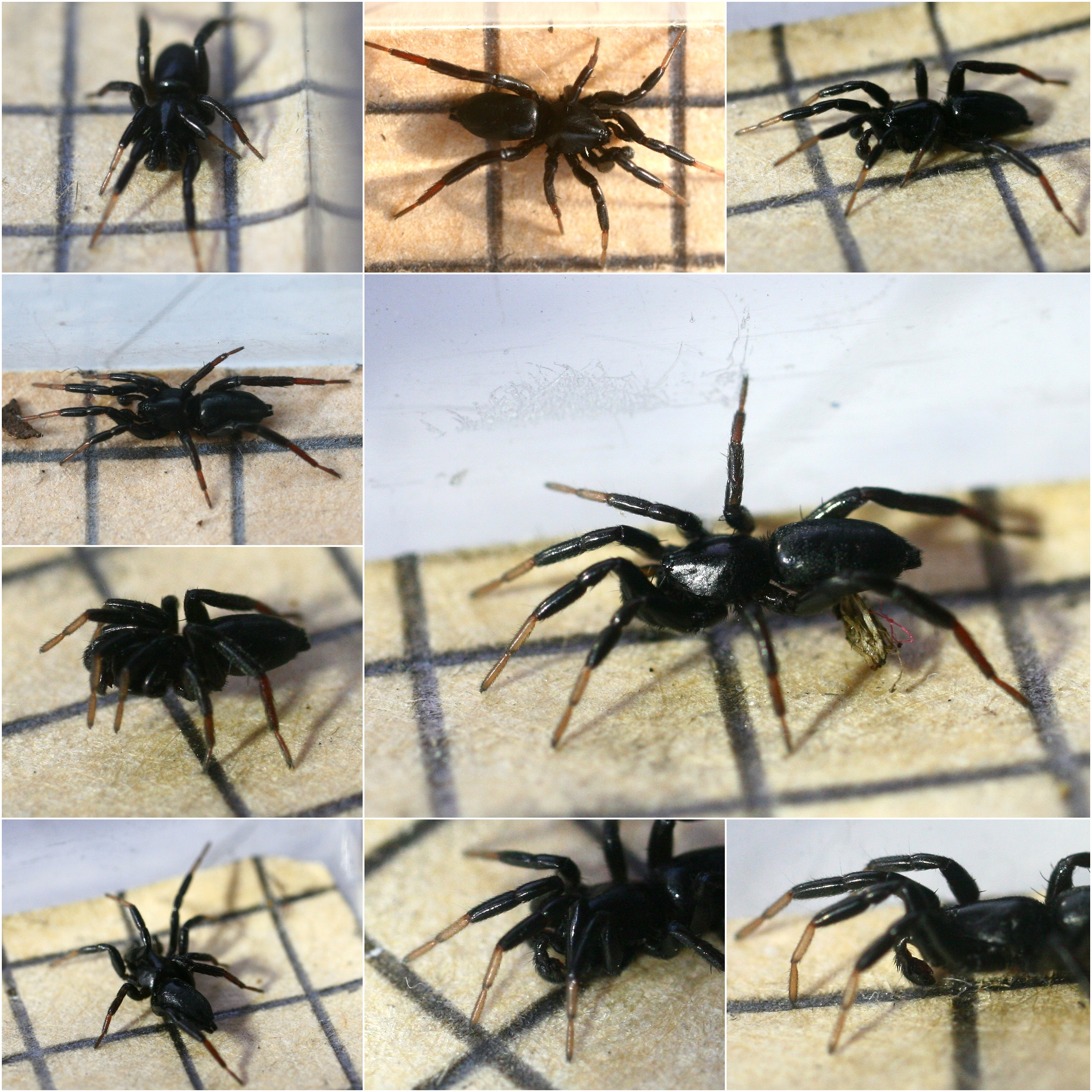
- D. pusillus

Scientific classification
- Kingdom: Animalia
- Phylum: Arthropoda
- Subphylum: Chelicerata
- Class: Arachnida
- Order: Araneae
- Infraorder: Araneomorphae
- Family: Gnaphosidae
- Genus: Drassyllus; Chamberlin, 1922

Type species
- D. fallens Chamberlin, 1922

Species
- 94, see text

= Drassyllus =

Genus of spiders

Drassyllus is a genus of ground spiders that was first described by R. V. Chamberlin in 1922.

== Species ==
As of May 2019 it contains ninety-four species:

- D. adocetus Chamberlin, 1936 – USA
- D. adullam Levy, 2009 – Israel
- D. alachua Platnick & Shadab, 1982 – USA
- D. amamiensis Kamura, 2011 – Japan
- D. antonito Platnick & Shadab, 1982 – USA, Mexico
- D. aprilinus (Banks, 1904) – USA, Mexico
- D. arizonensis (Banks, 1901) – USA, Mexico
- D. baccus Platnick & Shadab, 1982 – Mexico
- D. barbus Platnick, 1984 – USA
- D. biglobus Paik, 1986 – Russia (Far East), Korea
- D. broussardi Platnick & Horner, 2007 – USA
- D. callus Platnick & Shadab, 1982 – Mexico
- D. carbonarius (O. Pickard-Cambridge, 1872) – Israel
- D. cerrus Platnick & Shadab, 1982 – USA
- D. chibus Platnick & Shadab, 1982 – Mexico
- D. coajus Platnick & Shadab, 1982 – Mexico
- D. conformans Chamberlin, 1936 – USA, Mexico
- D. coreanus Paik, 1986 – China, Korea
- D. covensis Exline, 1962 – USA
- D. creolus Chamberlin & Gertsch, 1940 – USA, Canada
- D. crimeaensis Kovblyuk, 2003 – Macedonia, Greece, Ukraine, Turkey, Russia (Europe, Caucasus), Azerbaijan
- D. cyprius Chatzaki & Russell-Smith, 2017 – Cyprus
- D. dadia Komnenov & Chatzaki, 2016 – Greece, Turkey
- D. depressus (Emerton, 1890) – USA, Canada, Korea
- D. dixinus Chamberlin, 1922 – USA
- D. dromeus Chamberlin, 1922 – USA, Canada
- D. durango Platnick & Shadab, 1982 – Mexico
- D. ellipes Chamberlin & Gertsch, 1940 – USA
- D. eremitus Chamberlin, 1922 – USA, Canada
- D. eremophilus Chamberlin & Gertsch, 1940 – USA, Canada
- D. eurus Platnick & Shadab, 1982 – USA
- D. excavatus (Schenkel, 1963) – China
- D. fallens Chamberlin, 1922 (type) – USA, Canada
- D. fractus Chamberlin, 1936 – USA
- D. fragilis Ponomarev, 2008 – Kazakhstan
- D. frigidus (Banks, 1892) – USA
- D. gammus Platnick & Shadab, 1982 – Mexico
- D. gynosaphes Chamberlin, 1936 – USA
- D. huachuca Platnick & Shadab, 1982 – USA
- D. inanus Chamberlin & Gertsch, 1940 – USA
- D. insularis (Banks, 1900) – North America
- D. jabalpurensis Gajbe, 2005 – India
- D. jubatopalpis Levy, 1998 – Turkey, Israel
- D. khajuriai Tikader & Gajbe, 1976 – India
- D. lamprus (Chamberlin, 1920) – North America
- D. lepidus (Banks, 1899) – USA, Mexico
- D. louisianus Chamberlin, 1922 – USA
- D. lutetianus (L. Koch, 1866) – Europe to Kazakhstan
- D. mahabalei Tikader, 1982 – India
- D. mazus Platnick & Shadab, 1982 – Mexico
- D. mexicanus (Banks, 1898) – USA, Mexico
- D. mirus Platnick & Shadab, 1982 – Mexico
- D. mormon Chamberlin, 1936 – USA, Mexico
- D. mumai Gertsch & Riechert, 1976 – USA, Mexico
- D. nannellus Chamberlin & Gertsch, 1940 – USA, Canada
- D. niger (Banks, 1896) – USA, Canada
- D. notonus Chamberlin, 1928 – USA, Mexico
- D. novus (Banks, 1895) – USA, Canada
- D. ojus Platnick & Shadab, 1982 – USA, Mexico
- D. orgilus Chamberlin, 1922 – USA, Mexico
- D. orlando Platnick & Corey, 1989 – USA
- D. pantherius Hu & Wu, 1989 – China
- D. platnicki Gajbe, 1987 – India
- D. praeficus (L. Koch, 1866) – Europe to Central Asia
- D. proclesis Chamberlin, 1922 – USA
- D. prosaphes Chamberlin, 1936 – USA, Mexico
- D. pseudovinealis Kim, Yoo & Lee, 2018 – Korea
- D. puebla Platnick & Shadab, 1982 – Mexico
- D. pumiloides Chatzaki, 2003 – Greece (Crete)
- D. pumilus (C. L. Koch, 1839) – Europe to Central Asia
- D. pusillus (C. L. Koch, 1833) – Europe, Turkey, Caucasus, Russia (Europe to Far East), Central Asia, China
- D. ratnagiriensis Tikader & Gajbe, 1976 – India
- D. rufulus (Banks, 1892) – USA, Canada
- D. salton Platnick & Shadab, 1982 – USA
- D. sanmenensis Platnick & Song, 1986 – Russia (Far East), China, Korea, Japan
- D. saphes Chamberlin, 1936 – North America
- D. sasakawai Kamura, 1987 – Korea, Japan
- D. seminolus Chamberlin & Gertsch, 1940 – USA
- D. shaanxiensis Platnick & Song, 1986 – Russia (Caucasus) to China, Korea, Japan
- D. sinton Platnick & Shadab, 1982 – USA, Mexico
- D. socius Chamberlin, 1922 – USA, Canada
- D. sonus Platnick & Shadab, 1982 – Mexico
- D. sur Tuneva & Esyunin, 2003 – Turkey, Russia (Europe, Urals), Kazakhstan, Iran
- D. talus Platnick & Shadab, 1982 – Mexico
- D. tepus Platnick & Shadab, 1982 – Mexico
- D. texamans Chamberlin, 1936 – USA, Mexico
- D. tinus Platnick & Shadab, 1982 – Mexico
- D. villicoides (Giltay, 1932) – Greece
- D. villicus (Thorell, 1875) – Europe, Azerbaijan
- D. villus Platnick & Shadab, 1982 – Mexico
- D. vinealis (Kulczyński, 1897) – Central to Eastern Europe, Turkey, Caucasus, Russia (Europe to Far East), Kazakhstan, China, Korea, Japan
- D. yaginumai Kamura, 1987 – Korea, Japan
- D. yunnanensis Platnick & Song, 1986 – China, Myanmar
- D. zimus Platnick & Shadab, 1982 – Mexico
