= Geumosan (North Gyeongsang) =

Mountain in North Gyeongsang, South Korea

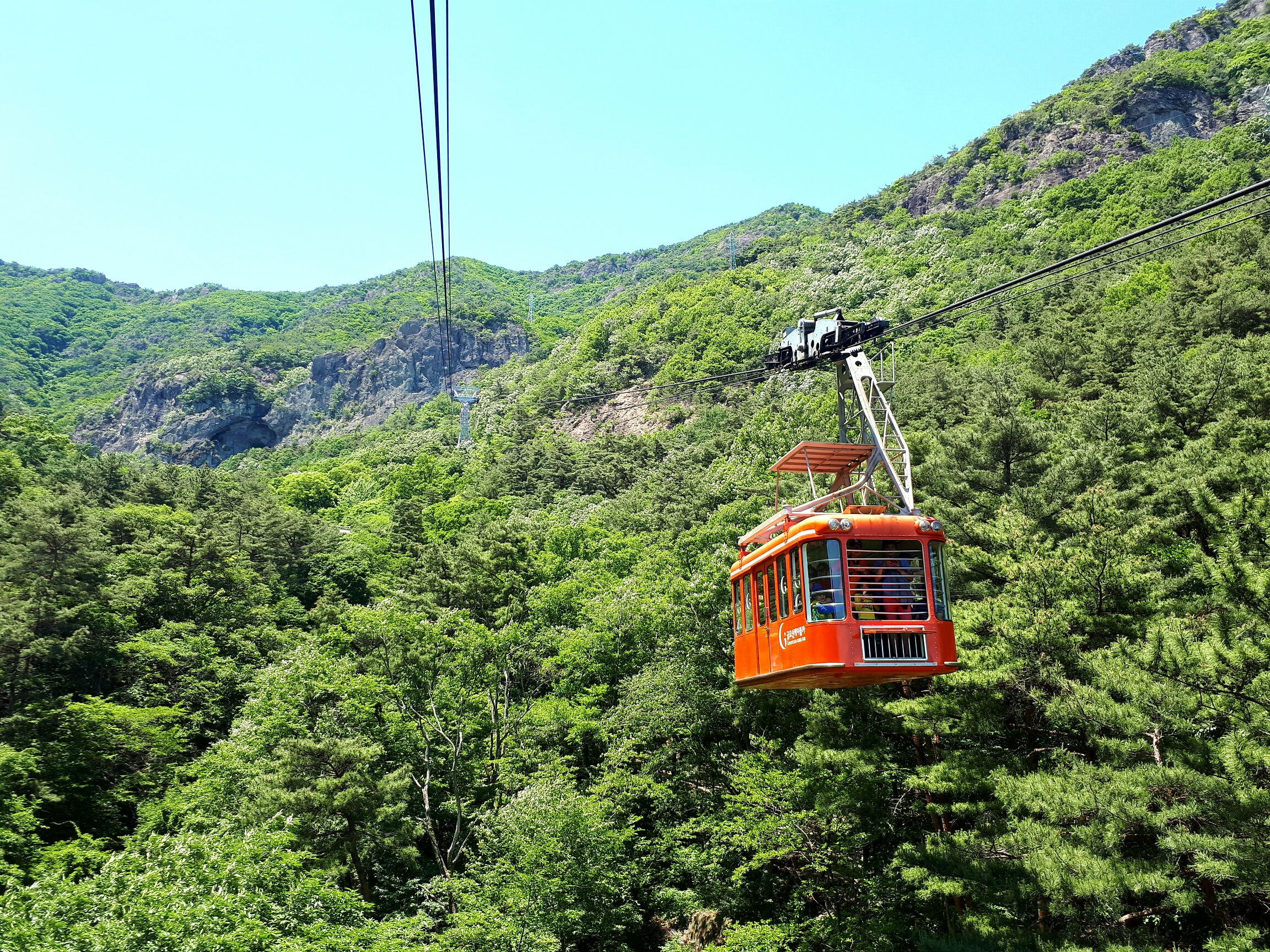
- Geumo mountain cable car

Highest point
- Elevation: 977 m (3,205 ft)
- Coordinates: 36°05′17″N 128°18′21″E

Geography
- Location: North Gyeongsang Province, South Korea

Geumosan (Korean: 금오산) is a mountain of North Gyeongsang Province, eastern South Korea. It has an elevation of 977 metres.

It is notably connected to South Korean president Park Chung Hee, as Park's birthplace is to its immediate east. A number of monuments (with some having been defaced due to Park's controversial legacy) to Park exist on the mountain.

== See also ==
- List of mountains of Korea
