= Musical Park Chung Hee =

South Korean biographical musical

- Poster for their September 2021 run in Hongdae
- Premiere: June 17, 2021: LG Arts Center, Seoul, South Korea

Musical Park Chung Hee (Korean: 뮤지컬 박정희) is a South Korean musical based on the life of South Korean president Park Chung Hee.

The musical first ran in the LG Arts Center in Seoul on June 17, 2021. It was produced by the conservative thinktank HoverLab.

Actress Noh Min-ah played Park's daughter, president Park Geun-hye.

The full musical has been uploaded to YouTube for free viewing by HoverLab.
