= Gumi, South Korea =

City in North Gyeongsang, South Korea

Coordinates: 36°07′10″N 128°20′40″E

Gumi
- Municipal City
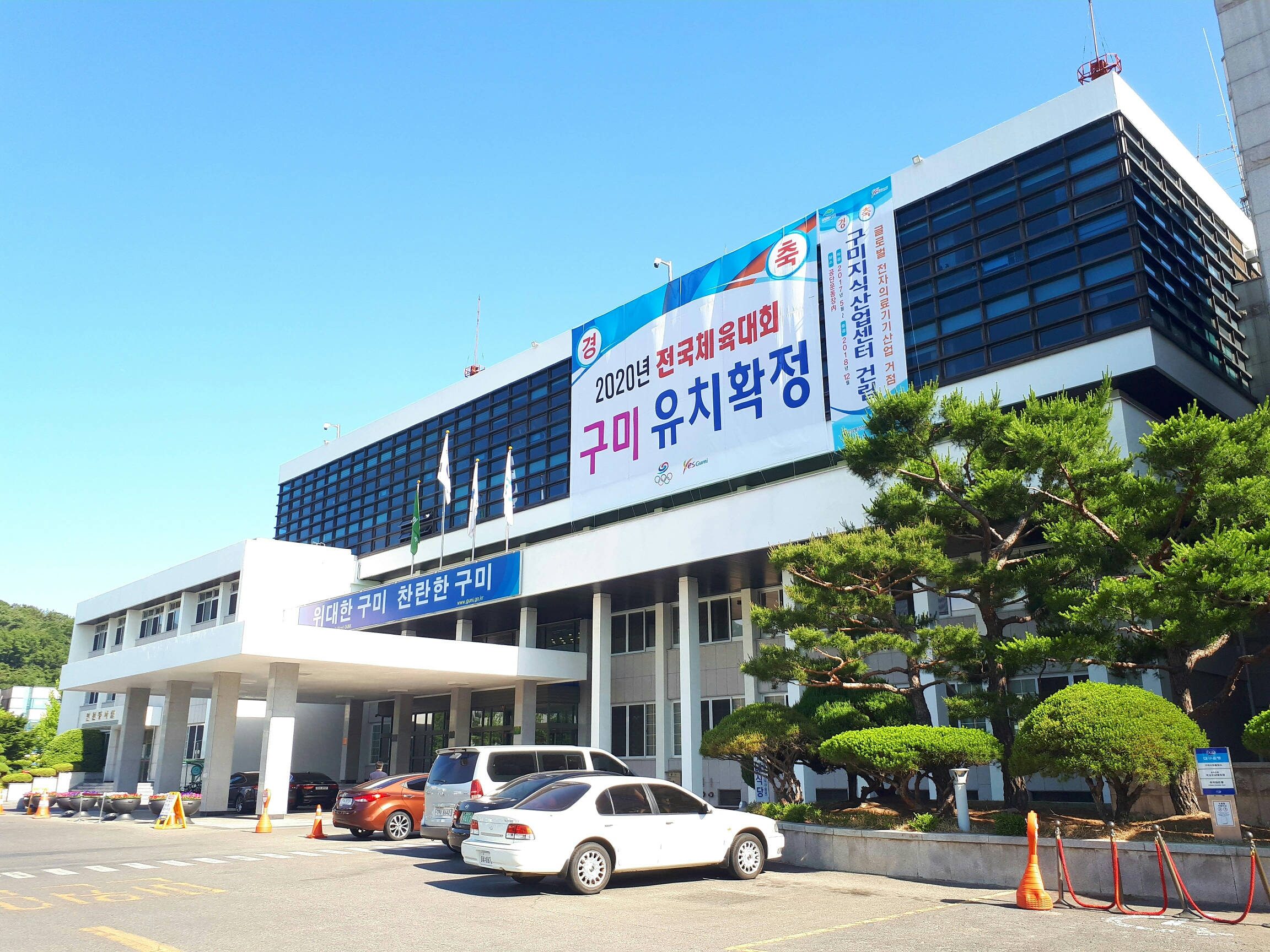
- Panoramic view of Gumi Gumi city hall

- Flag Emblem of Gumi

- Location in South Korea
- Country: South Korea
- Region: Yeongnam
- Administrative divisions: 3 eup, 5 myeon, 17 dong

Government
  - mayor: Jang Ho Kim (김장호)

Area
  - Total: 616.25 km^{2} (237.94 sq mi)

Population (September 2024)
  - Total: 404,691
  - Density: 552.5/km^{2} (1,431/sq mi)
  - Dialect: Gyeongsang
- Demonym: Gumite
- Time zone: UTC+9 (Korea Standard Time)
- Area code: +82-54

Korean name
- Hangul: 구미시
- Hanja: 龜尾市
- RR: Gumi-si
- MR: Kumi-si

Gumi (Korean: 구미; Korean pronunciation: [ku.mi]) is the second largest and most densely populated city in North Gyeongsang Province, South Korea. It is located on the Nakdong River, halfway between Daegu and Gimcheon, also lies on the Gyeongbu Expressway and Gyeongbu Line railway which are the principal traffic routes of the country.

The city is an industrial centre of the country with many companies, including Samsung Electronics, LG Electronics, LG Display, having a manufacturing presence and R&D Centres there.

The primary industries are electronics and IT Manufacturing such as smartphones, tablet computers, 5G and 6G networking equipment, semiconductors, OLED and other displays, carbonated fibres, rubber, plastic and metal products. In Gumi, 1,772 companies employ over 80,000 workers. It is the largest scale in Korea. In 2009, the city exported the largest amount in the country and accounted for 96.9% of trade surplus of South Korea in 2000 to 2009.

The birthplace of South Korean president Park Chung Hee is in the city.

== History ==
In the Three Kingdoms period, Gumi was part of the territory of the Silla Kingdom. The first Silla temple, Dorisa, was constructed here by Monk Ado who is also the one that made Jikjisa.

The city is the birthplace of the 1962–1979 South Korean president Park Chung Hee. It was during his administration that the South Korean government selected Gumi as a site for major industrial development. Gumi developed rapidly during the 1960s, growing from a small rural town into a large city thanks to huge infusions of development money from the government. It was selected for development for some practical reasons such as its easy access to transportation infrastructure, and its location in the industrialized Yeongnam region.

=== Industrial accident ===
On September 27, 2012, workers at the Hube Global plant in Gumi were unloading hydrofluoric acid (HF) from a tanker when an explosion occurred causing about 8 tonnes of the acid to leak into the surrounding area. The leak caused 5 deaths initially and prompted more than 3000 people to seek medical attention at local hospitals. Local rice and grape crops were ruined because the acid caused them to wither. Approximately 3,200 livestock were exposed. The acid, which can etch glass and is used in the electronics industry, caused damage to at least 1,000 vehicles. Total damage costs as of October 10, 2012 were about US$16 million.

== Administrative divisions ==
The city center of Gumi is divided into 17 dong, or neighbourhood units. The hinterland is divided into 5 myeon, or rural areas, and 3 eup, or large villages. Sandong was promoted from a myeon to an eup on 1 January 2021.

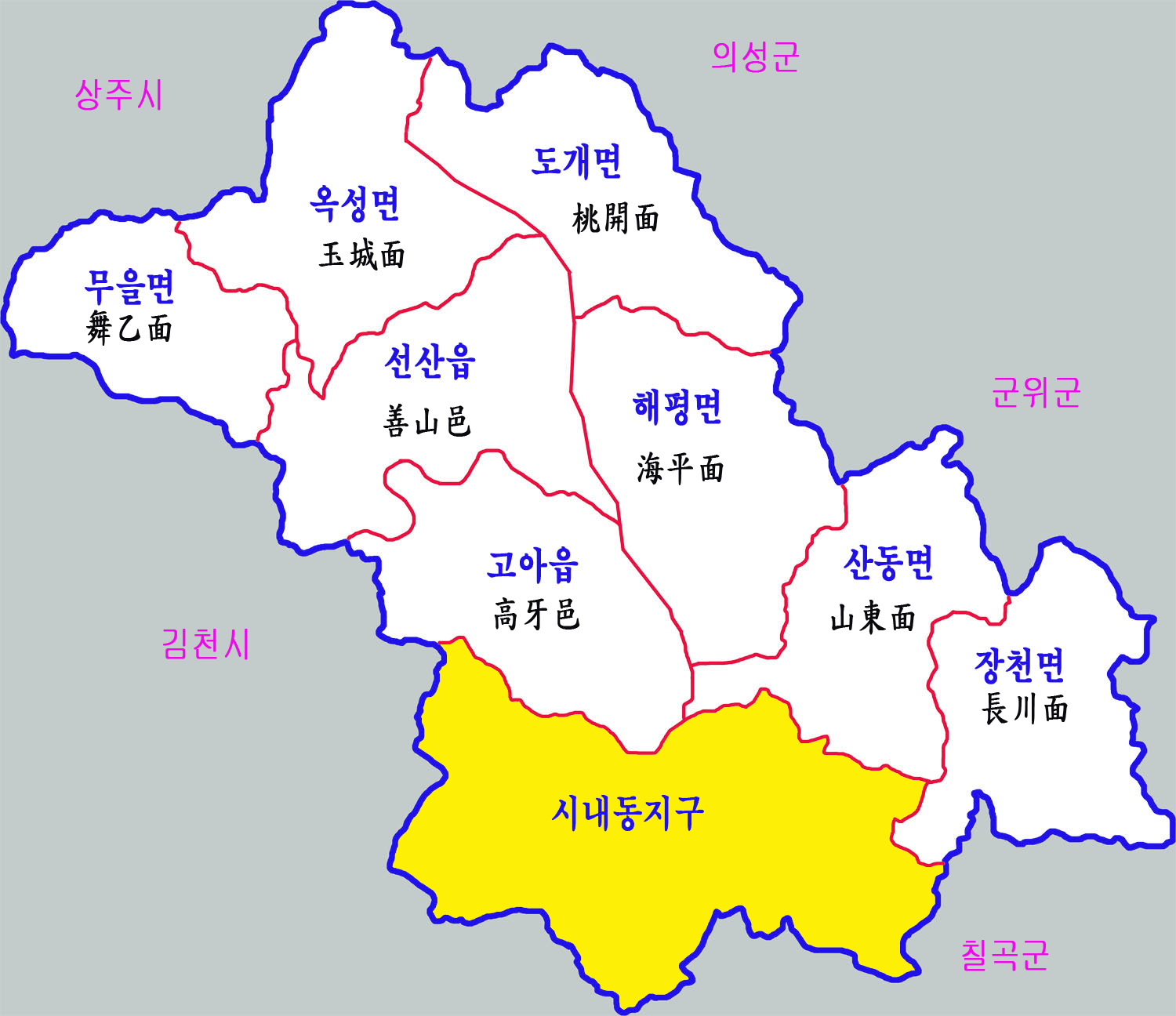
Map of Gumi eup, myeon and dong in Korean

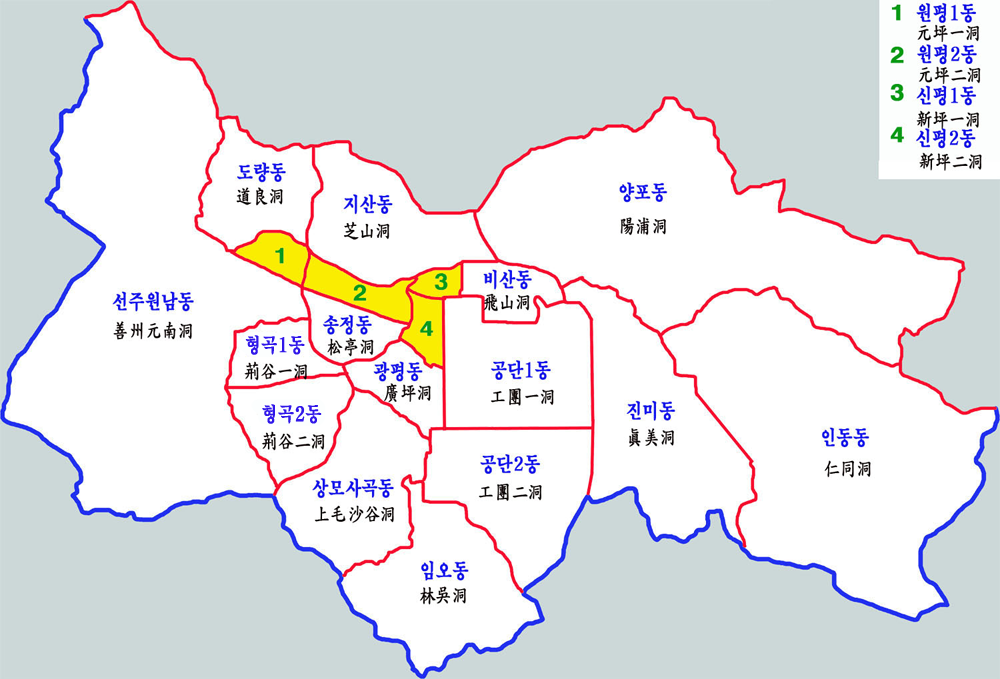
Inset map

Name	Hangeul	Hanja
Seonsan-eup	선산읍	善山邑
Goa-eup	고아읍	高牙邑
Sandong-eup	산동읍	山東邑
Mueul-myeon	무을면	舞乙面
Okseong-myeon	옥성면	玉城面
Dogae-myeon	도개면	桃開面
Haepyeong-myeon	해평면	海平面
Jangcheon-myeon	장천면	長川面
Songjeong-dong	송정동	松亭洞
Wonpyeong-dong	원평동	元坪洞
Doryang-dong	도량동	道良洞
Jisan-dong	지산동	芝山洞
Seongjuwonnam-dong	선주원남동	善州元南洞
Hyeonggok 1(il)-dong	형곡1동	荊谷一洞
Hyeonggok 2(i)-dong	형곡2동	荊谷二洞
Sinpyeong 1(il)-dong	신평1동	新坪一洞
Sinpyeong 2(i)-dong	신평2동	新坪二洞
Bisan-dong	비산동	飛山洞
Gongdan-dong	공단동	工團洞
Gwangpyeong-dong	광평동	廣坪洞
Sangmosagok-dong	상모사곡동	上毛沙谷洞
Imo-dong	임오동	林烏洞
Indong-dong	인동동	仁同洞
Jinmi-dong	진미동	眞美洞
Yangpo-dong	양포동	陽浦洞

== People ==
- Former South Korean president Park Chung Hee
- Former KCIA director and assassin Kim Jae-gyu
- Professional golfer Baek Kyu-jung (LPGA of Korea Tour)
- Singer and I Am A Singer 4 finalist Hwang Chi-yeul
- Singer and H.O.T. member Jang Woo-hyuk
- Singer and g.o.d member Kim Tae-woo
- Esports player NaDa
- Girl group member Im Chan-mi from AOA
- Singer and DKZ member Jonghyeong
- MMA fighter currently competing in the UFC Doo Ho Choi
- Kim Jae-gyu, politician and army general involved in the assassination of Park Chung Hee

Population: At present, the population of Gumi is 427,770 (as of February 19, 2019).

== Sport ==
Gumi was the homeground of the KB Insurance Stars volleyball team until July 2017, when the club relocated to Uijeongbu. The team played at the Park Chung Hee Gymnasium.

== Geumo Mountain ==
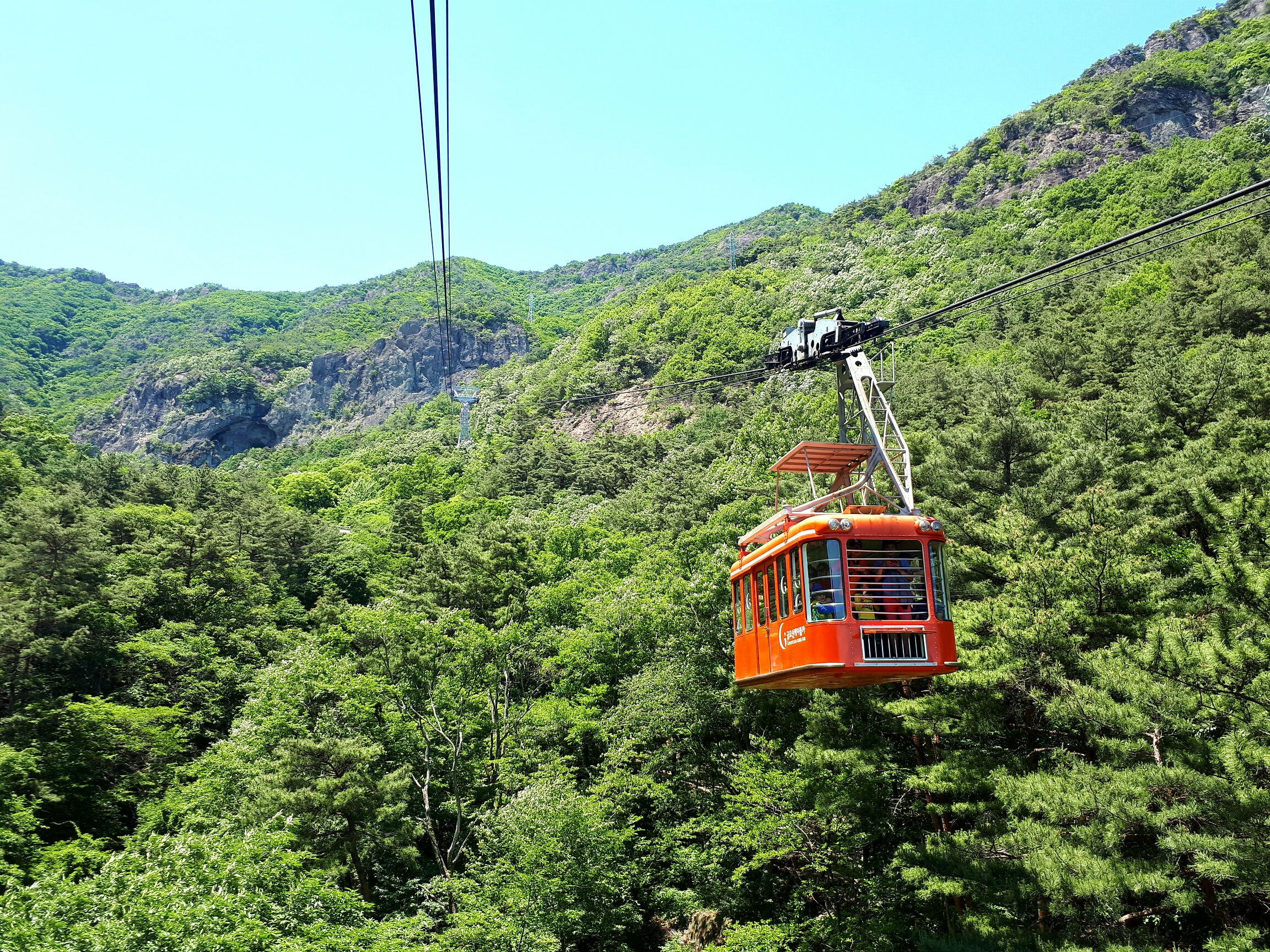
Geumo Mountain cable car

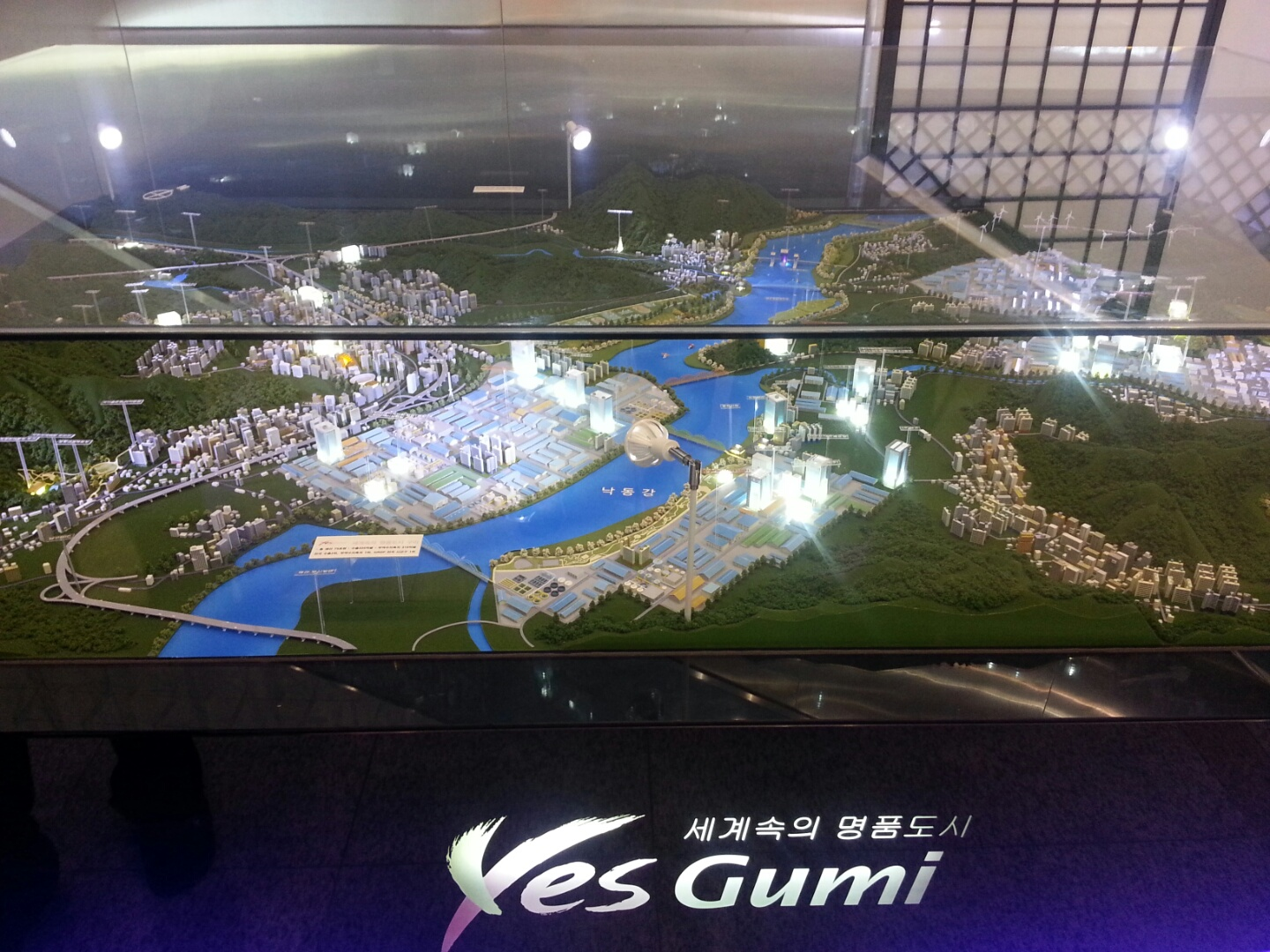
City Scale model

Geumo Mountain (Geumo San) Provincial Park is a hiking destination. The peak at 976 m above sea level is one of the eight famous spots in the Yeongman area and is the location of the start of the nature preservation campaign in Korea. The park has an amusement area called Geumo Land and the Geumo reservoir. There are several interesting sites on the mountain that include:

- Doesan Cave named after the Buddhist monk Doesan who attained a state of nirvana in the cave. He was a master of the theory of "divination based on topography" in the later Shilla dynasty.
- Daehye Waterfall is 27 m high and is especially full during the rainy season. It can be completely dry during periods without rain and is frozen in winter.
- The HaeUn Buddhist Temple is also near the top of the cable car route.
- The YakSa Temple is an active Buddhist temple and is said to have been created to commemorate Saint Ulsang's attainment of nirvana. It is sited near the top of the mountain and can be reached both from the peak and by a trail from the bottom. It has a unique bell that sits on a separate spike of rock connected by a suspension bridge.
- The Ma Ae Cliff Buddha (National Treasure #490) is carved into the corner of a cliff face and is thought to have been created during the Goryeo dynasty.

The Doesan Cave, Daehye Waterfall and HaeUn Buddhist Temple are all easily reached by taking the cable car from the entrance of the park and then hiking a short distance. The YakSa Temple and the Ma Ae cliff Buddha statue are both near the summit of Geumo Mountain and require about one to two hours of hiking to reach them.

== Climate ==
Climate data for Gumi (1991–2020 normals, extremes 1973–present)
Month	Jan	Feb	Mar	Apr	May	Jun	Jul	Aug	Sep	Oct	Nov	Dec	Year
Record high °C (°F)	15.3 (59.5)	24.0 (75.2)	28.5 (83.3)	32.9 (91.2)	36.7 (98.1)	36.7 (98.1)	38.3 (100.9)	38.1 (100.6)	35.9 (96.6)	30.0 (86.0)	24.7 (76.5)	18.1 (64.6)	38.3 (100.9)
Mean daily maximum °C (°F)	4.9 (40.8)	7.9 (46.2)	13.6 (56.5)	20.4 (68.7)	25.4 (77.7)	28.4 (83.1)	30.2 (86.4)	30.7 (87.3)	26.4 (79.5)	21.2 (70.2)	13.9 (57.0)	6.9 (44.4)	19.2 (66.6)
Daily mean °C (°F)	−0.6 (30.9)	1.8 (35.2)	7.1 (44.8)	13.3 (55.9)	18.6 (65.5)	22.6 (72.7)	25.3 (77.5)	25.6 (78.1)	20.6 (69.1)	14.2 (57.6)	7.4 (45.3)	1.1 (34.0)	13.1 (55.6)
Mean daily minimum °C (°F)	−5.4 (22.3)	−3.6 (25.5)	0.9 (33.6)	6.5 (43.7)	12.0 (53.6)	17.4 (63.3)	21.4 (70.5)	21.6 (70.9)	16.0 (60.8)	8.6 (47.5)	2.0 (35.6)	−3.7 (25.3)	7.8 (46.0)
Record low °C (°F)	−24.0 (−11.2)	−16.7 (1.9)	−10.4 (13.3)	−4.3 (24.3)	1.3 (34.3)	7.3 (45.1)	12.7 (54.9)	12.4 (54.3)	3.4 (38.1)	−3.3 (26.1)	−10.6 (12.9)	−15.2 (4.6)	−24.0 (−11.2)
Average precipitation mm (inches)	18.4 (0.72)	27.0 (1.06)	47.7 (1.88)	79.0 (3.11)	78.7 (3.10)	120.3 (4.74)	233.9 (9.21)	256.1 (10.08)	147.6 (5.81)	53.3 (2.10)	32.8 (1.29)	18.3 (0.72)	1,113.1 (43.82)
Average precipitation days (≥ 0.1 mm)	5.1	5.4	7.2	7.7	8.2	9.1	13.8	13.3	8.9	5.0	5.8	5.3	94.8
Average snowy days	5.0	3.8	1.9	0.1	0.0	0.0	0.0	0.0	0.0	0.0	1.0	3.6	15.5
Average relative humidity (%)	59.7	56.3	54.7	53.9	59.4	66.8	76.8	77.0	75.6	70.8	67.1	62.9	65.1
Mean monthly sunshine hours	166.8	176.2	203.8	222.9	239.0	194.1	164.2	170.3	165.6	185.9	156.7	158.6	2,204.1
Percentage possible sunshine	53.7	56.5	53.4	56.9	54.0	45.4	38.2	42.9	45.9	55.7	51.4	52.8	50.1
Source: Korea Meteorological Administration (snow and percent sunshine 1981–2010)

== Sister cities ==
- Plano, Texas, United States (since 1986)
- Zhongli District, Taoyuan, Taiwan (since 1989)
- Otsu, Shiga, Japan (since 1990)
- Bishkek, Kyrgyzstan (since 1991)
- Shenyang, Liaoning, People's Republic of China (since 1997)
- Changsha, Hunan, People's Republic of China (since 1998)
- Mexicali, Baja California, Mexico (since 1998)
- Eindhoven, Netherlands (since 2003)
- Weinan, Shaanxi, People's Republic of China (since 2014)
- Bangalore, Karnataka, India (since 2018)

== See also ==
- Geography of South Korea
- List of cities in South Korea
