= 3rd Blue Dragon Series Awards =

2024 South Korean television awards ceremony

- Official poster
- Awarded for: Excellence in OTT television
- Date: July 19, 2024
- Site: Paradise City, Incheon
- Hosted by: Jun Hyun-moo; Lim Yoona
- Organised by: Sports Chosun
- Most wins: Moving (3)
- Most nominations: Moving (7)
- Website: bsa.blueaward.co.kr/series/

Television/radio coverage
- Network: KBS2

The 3rd Blue Dragon Series Awards (Korean: 제3회 청룡 시리즈 어워즈) ceremony, organised by Sports Chosun was held at Paradise City, Incheon on July 19, 2024, at 20:30 (KST). It was hosted by Jun Hyun-moo and Lim Yoona and broadcast live through KBS2.

The nominees were announced on June 26, 2024. The series which were produced, invested by OTT platforms, and released from June 1, 2023, to May 31, 2024, were eligible for nominations.

== Winners and nominees ==
Winners are listed first and emphasized in bold.

**Blue Dragon's Choice (Grand Prize)**
**Moving**
**Best Drama**	**Best Entertainment Program**
**Daily Dose of Sunshine**; Mask Girl; Moving; A Killer Paradox; LTNS	**The Thought Verification Zone: The Community**; The Devil's Plan; SNL Korea Season 5; My Sibling's Romance; Crime Scene Returns
**Best Actor**	**Best Actress**
**Im Si-wan – Boyhood**; Ryu Seung-ryong – Moving; Ryu Jun-yeol – The 8 Show; Byun Yo-han – Uncle Samsik; Choi Woo-shik – A Killer Paradox	**Park Bo-young – Daily Dose of Sunshine**; Ahn Eun-jin – Goodbye Earth; Esom – LTNS; Chun Woo-hee – The 8 Show; Han Hyo-joo – Moving
**Best Male Entertainer**	**Best Female Entertainer**
**Shin Dong-yup – SNL Korea Season 5**; Dex – Zombieverse; Jo Sae-ho – Super Rich in Korea; Jee Seok-jin – Bro & Marble in Dubai; Code Kunst – My Sibling's Romance	**Jang Do-yeon – High School Mystery Club Season 3**; Park Ji-yoon – Crime Scene Returns; Lee Soo-ji – SNL Korea Season 5; Joo Hyun-young – Crime Scene Returns; Pung Ja – Let's Be Comfortable Season 3
**Best Supporting Actor**	**Best Supporting Actress**
**Ahn Jae-hong – Mask Girl**; Kim Sung-kyun – Moving; Seo Hyun-woo – A Shop for Killers; Lee Kyu-hyung – Uncle Samsik; Lee Hee-joon – A Killer Paradox	**Geum Hae-na – A Shop for Killers**; Kwak Sun-young – Moving; Yeom Hye-ran – Mask Girl; Lee Joo-young – The 8 Show; Tiffany Young – Uncle Samsik
**Best New Actor**	**Best New Actress**
**Lee Jung-ha – Moving**; Kim Woo-seok – Night Has Come; Roh Jae-won – Daily Dose of Sunshine; Lee Si-woo – Boyhood; Choi Hyun-wook – High Cookie	**Go Youn-jung – Moving**; Kim Hye-jun – A Shop for Killers; Lee Yul-eum – The 8 Show; Jang Da-ah – Pyramid Game; Jeon So-nee – Parasyte: The Grey
**Best New Male Entertainer**	**Best New Female Entertainer**
**Kwak Joon-bin – The Devil's Plan**; Ahn Do-kyu – SNL Korea Season 5; Jeong Se-woon – Nineteen to Twenty; Jonathan Yiombi – Zombieverse; Joo Woo-jae – Witch Hunt 2023	**Yoon Ga-i – SNL Korea Season 5**; Miyeon – My Sibling's Romance; Uhm Ji-yoon – Comedy Royale; Ji Ye-eun – SNL Korea Season 5; Patricia Yiombi – My Sibling's Romance
**Whynot Award**	**TIRTIR Popular Star Awards**
**An Yu-jin – Crime Scene Returns**	**Dex**; **Miyeon**; **Choi Woo-shik**; **Park Ji-yoon**
**OST Popularity Award**
**Zhang Hao – "I Wanna Know" (Exchange Season 3)**

=== Television programs with multiple wins ===
The following television programs received multiple wins:

Wins	Television programs
3	Moving
2	SNL Korea Season 5
2	Daily Dose of Sunshine

=== Television programs with multiple nominations ===
The following television programs received multiple nominations:

Nominations	Television programs
7	Moving
5	SNL Korea Season 5
4	The 8 Show
3	A Killer Paradox
3	A Shop for Killers
3	Crime Scene Returns
3	Daily Dose of Sunshine
3	Mask Girl
3	My Sibling's Romance
3	Uncle Samsik
2	Boyhood
2	LTNS
2	The Devil's Plan
2	Zombieverse

== Presenters and performers ==
The following individuals, listed in order of appearance, presented awards or performed musical numbers.

=== Presenters ===
Presenter(s)	Award(s)	Ref.
Dex and Kim Ah-young	Best New Male Entertainer and Best New Female Entertainer	
Park Ji-hoon and Shin Ye-eun	Best New Actor and Best New Actress	
Lee Dong-hwi and Lee Yu-bin	Best Supporting Actor	
Park Sung-hoon and Lim Ji-yeon	Best Supporting Actress	
Yoo Jae-suk and Joo Hyun-young	Best Male Entertainer and Best Female Entertainer	
Ha Jung-woo and Bae Suzy	Best Actor and Best Actress	
Lee Kwang-soo and Park Jin-joo	Best Entertainment Program	
Lee Je-hoon and Jo Bo-ah	Best Drama	
Song Hye-kyo	Blue Dragon's Choice (Grand Prize)	

=== Performers ===
Name(s)	Performed	Ref.
We Dem Boyz	"BSA Opening Performance" and "Missing You" (with Park Nam-jung)	
(G)I-dle	"Klaxon" and "Fate" (feat. Choi Hyun-wook)	
Jay Park	"Ganadara", "All I Wanna Do", "Taxi Blurr", "Mommae" and "McNasty"	
