= Crime Scene (South Korean TV series) =

South Korean variety show

- Crime Scene Title Logo
- Hangul: 크라임씬
- RR: Keuraimssin
- MR: K'ŭraimssin
- Genre: Variety; Mystery; Crime
- Directed by: Yoon Hyun-joon
- Starring: Various cast
- Country of origin: South Korea
- Original language: Korean
- No. of seasons: 6
- No. of episodes: 57 (list of episodes)

Production
- Production location: South Korea
- Running time: 75-115 minutes

Original release
- Network: JTBC
- Release: May 10, 2014 – July 14, 2017
- Network: TVING
- Release: February 9 – March 1, 2024
- Network: Netflix
- Release: September 23, 2025 – present

Crime Scene (Korean: 크라임씬) is a South Korean variety program with Hong Jin-ho, Park Ji-yoon, NS Yoon-G, Jun Hyun-moo, Lim Bang-geul, and Kang Yong-suk as the cast for the first season. The first season consists of 10 episodes and aired on JTBC from May 10 to July 12, 2014.

Hong Jin-ho and Park Ji-yoon returned for the second season. Together with new members Jang Jin, Jang Dong-min and Hani, the five of them formed the cast for the second season. The second season was aired on Wednesdays at 23:00 (KST) from April 1 to June 24, 2015. This is the first season to have the detective's assistant starting from Season 2 with actor Choi Won-myeong serves as the detective's assistant.

A third season began airing on April 28, 2017, with a preview episode a week earlier. It features returning cast members, Park Ji-yoon and Jang Jin, as well as newcomers, Kim Ji-hoon, Yang Se-hyung and Jung Eun-ji, with actor Kim Min-gue became the detective's assistant for the third season. The season ended on July 14, 2017.

The series made its return for the fourth season in 2024, titled Crime Scene Returns (Korean: 크라임씬 리턴즈), with both Park Ji-yoon and Jang Jin returning from the third season, and Jang Dong-min returning from the second season. They are joined by newcomers, Key of Shinee, Joo Hyun-young and An Yu-jin of Ive. The detective's assistant in this season is portrayed by singer Lee Jin-woo of Ghost9. The season premiered on TVING on February 9, 2024. PD Yoon Hyun-joon confirmed that the fourth season of Crime Scene will not feature additional guests for the entire season due to time constraint as the fourth season already had 3 new cast members.

The fifth season, titled Crime Scene Zero (Korean: 크라임씬 제로), will be returning on Netflix, with Jang Jin, Park Ji-yoon, Jang Dong-min and An Yu-jin returning from the fourth season, and Kim Ji-hoon returning from the third season. The sixth player's slot will be filled by different special guests for each episode. The detective's assistant for this season would be portrayed by Minhee of Cravity. Crime Scene Zero was released worldwide simultaneously on Netflix on September 23, 2025, with new episodes sequentially released every Tuesday for the next three weeks. This is the first season to not feature newcomers as all the cast members were returned from previous seasons.

On January 13, 2026, Netflix and PD Yoon Hyun-joon announced that the series will be renewed for its sixth season with both the words "Beginning" and "Evolution" being chosen as the main keywords.

== Format ==
=== Season 1 ===
At the start of the game, the players (both recurring cast members and guests) are introduced to the "Crime Scene", which is a mockup of a murder scene replicated on a stage area, and are tasked with figuring out who the murderer is.

- Case Briefing: Upon discovering the crime scene, the players are given the "case briefing", which includes a summary of events that occurred before the murder and a list of the possible suspects. Immediately afterwards, each player chooses a suspect to roleplay as for the remainder of the game. The players are then given more detailed information about the suspect they are respectively portraying, including the suspect's personality, whereabouts during the crime, relationship to the other suspects, and (in the case of the murderer) evidence that can be used against them. The rest of the investigation is split up into several segments:
- Alibi: Each player introduces themselves as the suspect they are portraying, gives some background information about their relationship with the victim, and describes their whereabouts before and during the crime. The criminal must lie about this while the others must tell the truth. The other players are allowed to ask questions during this time but the player currently giving their alibi is not required to respond.
- On-Site Investigation: Each player is given ten minutes to investigate the crime scene for clues. To aid the players in remembering clues they deem important, they are also each given a camera that can take up to ten pictures. For the first two cases this segment was run individually, however from the third case onward this segment was run in pairs.
- 5-Minute Briefing or Free Briefing:
  - 5-Minute Briefing: After everyone has finished the On-Site Investigation, each player has five minutes to present any evidence they may have found or theories that they are currently considering. To help present their point, a dry-erase board and marker are provided. They are also allowed to ask the other players questions concerning evidence, however the clock will not pause for questions. Additionally, only the player currently giving the briefing is allowed to ask any questions.
  - Free Briefing: Similar to the 5-Minute Briefing, except for the fact that no time limit is imposed on the players and everyone is allowed to ask questions.
- First Criminal Vote: Normally presented after the briefing, each player secretly votes for who they currently think is the criminal. The overall results are then revealed to all of the players to use during the following discussion.
- Free Talk: The players are seated in a circle and allowed to freely discuss the case in order to come to a consensus on the murderer. The players may only use evidence collected thus far, and are not allowed to return to the crime scene during this segment. They are also given hints over the course of the segment to aid in their discussion.
  - Hints: Two additional clues pointing to the murderer are given to the players during Free Talk. These hints can range from autopsy reports, to the personal belongings of the suspects, to a CCTV recording from the day of the murder.
- Additional On-Site Investigation: All the players gather at the crime scene for additional investigation and discussion. This segment is normally when the players investigate areas they missed during the initial On-Site Investigation and explore theories discussed during Free Talk. This segment is run at the same time as the 1-on-1 Interrogation.
  - 1-on-1 Interrogation: At some point during the Additional On-Site Investigation, each player heads to the interrogation room and calls another player in order to have a one on one discussion with them. Once called, the summoned player must leave the crime scene immediately and head to the interrogation room. Once the summoned player arrives the players are given 3 minutes for any discussion they would like to have. Although it is generally expected that the three minutes are used to interrogate the summoned player, this time has also been used for private collaboration. Players can be summoned more than once and consequently may lose precious time that could have been used to further investigate the crime scene.
- Final Criminal Vote: After all of the players have had their 1-on-1 Interrogation, the game goes to the final vote. At this point, any additional investigation is prohibited, though the players are still free to discuss amongst themselves. Each player then secretly votes for who they think is the final criminal, and the result of these votes determine the outcome of the game.
- Results: After the Final Criminal Vote, the player who receives the most votes is "arrested" and locked in a makeshift prison, and the players who voted for that person are revealed. If the arrested player is the criminal, everyone who voted for that player receives a bag of gold coins. However, if the arrested player is not the criminal, the actual criminal wins all of the gold coins that the other players would have won.

=== Season 2 ===
Slight changes were made to the format in Season 2.

- Addition of "Detective" Role: In every case one of the players is now assigned the "detective" role. The detective is always innocent and therefore can serve as a trusted ally to the other players. Additionally, the detective is given two votes instead of one, and is allowed to either split them or vote for the same suspect twice. Finally, the detective is now the only player who can request a 1-on-1 Interrogation.
- Prize Distribution Change: Instead of a bag of gold coins, each player receives ₩1,000,000 (appx. US$1,000) for correctly guessing the criminal (the detective receives twice as much if they use both of their votes on the same suspect). As in Season 1, if the criminal is not arrested, the criminal takes all of the winnings instead. Once the season is over, only the top 3 players get to keep their earnings (all of the guests are treated as a single player for this purpose).

=== Season 3 ===
The format has stayed relatively the same since the beginning, however minor changes have been added in Season 3.

- Detective's Assistant: In Season 2, the detective's assistant was a crew member who helped deliver hints to the cast, as well as bring suspects in at the start of the episode and escort them to 1-on-1 Interrogations with the detective. The detective's assistant now has a larger role in Season 3. Additionally, he now sits in the Briefing where the players discuss evidence, and the detective can consult with him before their first criminal vote.
- On-Site Investigation: Players are now allowed 15 minutes to survey the crime scene and look for evidence.

== Cast ==
=== Season 1 ===
Season 1 Promotional Poster

Name	Profession	Date of birth	Note(s)
Park Ji-yoon	Broadcaster	March 23, 1979 (age 47)	
Hong Jin-ho	Broadcaster, former professional StarCraft player	October 31, 1982 (age 43)	
Jun Hyun-moo	Broadcaster	November 7, 1977 (age 48)	
NS Yoon-G	Singer	September 6, 1988 (age 38)	
Lim Bang-geul	Lawyer	1979	Episodes 1–6; 10
Kang Yong-suk	Lawyer, broadcaster	December 3, 1969 (age 56)	Episodes 7–10

=== Season 2 ===
Season 2 Promotional Poster

Name	Profession	Date of birth	Note(s)
Park Ji-yoon	Broadcaster	March 23, 1979 (age 47)	
Hong Jin-ho	Broadcaster, former professional StarCraft player	October 31, 1982 (age 43)	
Jang Jin	Director	February 24, 1971 (age 55)	
Jang Dong-min	Broadcaster, comedian	July 20, 1979 (age 47)	
Hani (EXID)	Singer	May 1, 1992 (age 34)	

=== Season 3 ===
Season 3 Promotional Poster

Name	Profession	Date of birth	Note(s)
Park Ji-yoon	Broadcaster	March 23, 1979 (age 47)	
Jang Jin	Director	February 24, 1971 (age 55)	
Kim Ji-hoon	Actor	May 9, 1981 (age 45)	
Yang Se-hyung	Comedian, entertainer	August 18, 1985 (age 41)	
Jung Eun-ji (Apink)	Singer, actress	August 18, 1993 (age 33)	
Kim Min-gue	Actor	December 25, 1994 (age 31)	

=== Season 4 ===
Name	Profession	Date of birth	Note(s)
Park Ji-yoon	Broadcaster	March 23, 1979 (age 47)	
Jang Jin	Director	February 24, 1971 (age 55)	
Jang Dong-min	Broadcaster, comedian	July 20, 1979 (age 47)	
Key (Shinee)	Singer, entertainer	September 23, 1991 (age 35)	
Joo Hyun-young	Actress	January 14, 1996 (age 30)	
An Yu-jin (Ive)	Singer	September 1, 2003 (age 23)	

=== Season 5 ===
Name	Profession	Date of birth	Note(s)
Park Ji-yoon	Broadcaster	March 23, 1979 (age 47)	
Jang Jin	Director	February 24, 1971 (age 55)	
Jang Dong-min	Broadcaster, comedian	July 20, 1979 (age 47)	
Kim Ji-hoon	Actor	May 9, 1981 (age 45)	
An Yu-jin (Ive)	Singer	September 1, 2003 (age 23)	

== Episodes ==
=== Season 1 ===
List of Episodes (1 – 10)

Episode	Broadcast date	Guest(s)	Criminal	Results
1	May 10, 2014	Henry Lau	Lim Bang-Geul (Daughter Lee Bo-eun)	Arrested: Jun Hyun-moo; Won: Lim Bang-geul
2	May 17, 2014	Henry Lau	Lim Bang-Geul (Daughter Lee Bo-eun)	Arrested: Jun Hyun-moo; Won: Lim Bang-geul
3	May 24, 2014	Henry Lau	Hong Jin-ho (Class president Tom)	Arrested: Park Ji-yoon; Won: Hong Jin-ho
4	May 31, 2014	Henry Lau	Hong Jin-ho (Class president Tom)	Arrested: Park Ji-yoon; Won: Hong Jin-ho
5	June 7, 2014	Kang Min-hyuk (CNBLUE); Lim Moon-gyu	NS Yoon-G (Secretary Kim)	Arrested: NS Yoon-G; Won: Park Ji-yoon, Hong Jin-ho, Jun Hyun-moo, Lim Bang-geul
6	June 14, 2014	Kang Min-hyuk (CNBLUE); Lim Moon-gyu	NS Yoon-G (Secretary Kim)	Arrested: NS Yoon-G; Won: Park Ji-yoon, Hong Jin-ho, Jun Hyun-moo, Lim Bang-geul
7	June 21, 2014	Kim Sung-kyu (INFINITE)	Park Ji-yoon (Larceny Park)	Arrested: Hong Jin-ho; Won: Park Ji-yoon
8	June 28, 2014	Soyou (Sistar)	Hong Jin-ho (Director Hong)	Arrested: Hong Jin-ho; Won: Park Ji-yoon, Jun Hyun-moo, NS Yoon-G, Kang Yong-suk
9	July 5, 2014	Key (SHINee)	Jun Hyun-moo (Reporter Jun)	Arrested: Park Ji-yoon; Won: Jun Hyun-moo
10	July 12, 2014	Kang Min-hyuk (CNBLUE); Lim Moon-gyu	Jun Hyun-moo (Star Jun)	Arrested: Jun Hyun-moo; Won: Hong Jin-ho, NS Yoon-G, Kang Yong-suk, Kang Min-hyuk, Lim Moon-gyu

=== Season 2 ===
List of Episodes (1 – 13)

Episode	Broadcast date	Guest(s)	Detective	Detective's Assistant	Criminal	Results
1 Dawn of a Deduction War (Introduction episode)	April 1, 2015	-	Hong Jin-ho; Hani; Jang Dong-min; Park Ji-yoon; Jang Jin	-	Superstar Writer	Hong Jin-ho: 70; Hani: 70; Jang Dong-min: 55; Park Ji-yoon: 35; Jang Jin: 30
2 Gallery Murder (Case 1)	April 8, 2015	Kim Ji-hoon	Jang Jin	Choi Won-myeong	Jang Dong-min (Dealer Jang)	Arrested: Hong Jin-ho; Won: Jang Dong-min (+300)
3 Fried Chicken Place Murder (Case 2)	April 15, 2015	Kim Ji-hoon	Park Ji-yoon	Choi Won-myeong	Kim Ji-hoon (Worker Kim)	Arrested: Hani; Won: Kim Ji-hoon (+300)
4 Beauty Contest Murder (Case 3)	April 22, 2015	Oh Hyun-kyung	Jang Dong-min	Choi Won-myeong	Park Ji-yoon (Beauty Park/Park Kangnam)	Arrested: Park Ji-yoon; Won: Jang Dong-min (+200), Hong Jin-ho (+100), Jang Jin (+100), Hani (+100)
5 Chaebol Female College Student Murder (Case 4)	April 29, 2015	Xiumin (EXO)	Hani	Choi Won-myeong	Jang Dong-min (Boyfriend Jang)	Arrested: Jang Dong-min; Won: Hani (+100), Jang Jin (+100), Xiumin (+100)
6 Entertainment Agency Murder (Case 5)	May 6, 2015	Xiumin (EXO); Yoon Sung-ho	Hong Jin-ho	Choi Won-myeong	Xiumin (Vocal Si)	Victim: Yoon Sung-ho (President Yoon); Arrested: Xiumin; Won: Hong Jin-ho (+200), Park Ji-yoon (+100), Jang Dong-min (+100), Hani (+100)
7 Cruise Murder I (Case 6)	May 13, 2015	Xiumin (EXO)	Jang Jin	Choi Won-myeong	Xiumin (Manager Si)	Arrested: Jang Dong-min; Won: Xiumin (+400)
8 Cruise Murder II (Case 7)	May 20, 2015	NS Yoon-G; Kang Min-hyuk (CNBLUE)	Jang Jin	Choi Won-myeong	Hani (Stewardess Ha/ Stewardess Koo)	Victim: Hong Jin-ho (Captain Hong); Arrested: Hani; Won: Park Ji-yoon (+100), Jang Dong-min (+100), NS Yoon-G (+100)
9 Unit 804 Murder (Case 8)	May 27, 2015	Jun Hyun-moo	Jang Dong-min	Choi Won-myeong	Hong Jin-ho (Jang Jin-ho)	Arrested: Jang Jin; Won: Hong Jin-ho (+500)
10; Intersection Murder (Case 9)	June 3, 2015	BoA	Park Ji-yoon	Choi Won-myeong	Hani (Fairy Ha)	Arrested: Hani; Won: Park Ji-yoon (+100), Jang Jin (+100), BoA (+100)
11; Mountain Villa Murder (Case 10)	June 10, 2015	Kim Ji-hoon; Jang Sung-kyu	Hong Jin-ho	Choi Won-myeong	Jang Dong-min (Amateur Jang/Agent Jang)	Arrested: Jang Dong-min; Won: Park Ji-yoon (+100), Jang Jin (+100), Hani (+100)
12; Crime Scene PD Murder (Case 11)	June 17, 2015	Pyo Chang-won	Pyo Chang-won	Choi Won-myeong	Jang Jin (Genius Director)	Arrested: Jang Jin; Arrested by: Park Ji-yoon, Hong Jin-ho, Hani, Pyo Chang-won
13; Crime Scene PD Murder II (Case 12)	June 24, 2015	Pyo Chang-won	Pyo Chang-won	Choi Won-myeong	Park Ji-yoon (Queen of MC)	Arrested: Park Ji-yoon; Won: Hong Jin-ho (+200), Jang Jin (+200), Jang Dong-min (+200), Hani (+200)

==== Crime Scene 2 Awards ====
Category	Winner
Winner	Hong Jin-ho
Runner-up	Jang Dong-min
3rd Place	Guests
Best Deductions	Jang Jin
Best Chemistry	Park Ji-yoon (Jazz Park) & Hong Jin-ho (Captain Hong)
Best Acting	Park Ji-yoon
Best Video Clip	Hani (Dawn of a Deduction War)
Best Character	Park Ji-yoon (Beauty Park/Park Kangnam)
Best Guest	Xiumin

=== Season 3 ===
List of Episodes (0 – 12)

Episode	Broadcast date	Guest(s)	Detective	Detective's Assistant	Criminal	Results
0 The Prelude to a Deduction War (Preview episode)	April 21, 2017	-	-	-	-	-
1 The Presidential Candidate Murder Case	April 28, 2017	Song Jae-rim	Kim Ji-hoon	Kim Min-Gue	Song Jae-rim (Representative Song)	Arrested: Song Jae-rim; Won: Kim Ji-hoon (+100), Park Ji-yoon (+100), Jang Jin (+100), Yang Se-hyung (+100), Jung Eun-ji (+100); Assistant Detective's Choice: Yang Se-hyung (Mr. Yang)
2 The Star Chef Murder Case	May 5, 2017	Song Jae-rim; Jang Sung-kyu	Yang Se-hyung	Kim Min-Gue	Kim Ji-hoon (Owner Kim)	Arrested: Kim Ji-hoon; Won: Park Ji-yoon (+100), Jang Jin (+100), Jung Eun-ji (+100), Song Jae-rim (+100); Assistant Detective's Choice: Jang Jin (Rookie Jang), Park Ji-yoon (Actress Park)
3 The Police Academy Murder Case	May 12, 2017	NS Yoon-G; Hani	Jang Jin	Kim Min-Gue	NS Yoon-G (Professor Yoon)	Arrested: Kim Ji-hoon; Won: NS Yoon-G (+300); Assistant Detective's Choice: Park Ji-yoon (Recruit Park)
4 The Swindler Murder Case	May 19, 2017	Kim Byeong-ok	Jung Eun-ji	Kim Min-Gue	Yang Se-hyung (Detective Yang)	Arrested: Jang Jin; Won: Yang Se-hyung (+400); Assistant Detective's Choice: Jang Jin (Secretary Jang)
5 The Musical Actor Murder Case	May 26, 2017	Jinyoung (B1A4)	Yang Se-hyung	Kim Min-Gue	Jung Eun-ji (CEO Jung)	Arrested: Jung Eun-ji; Won: Yang Se-hyung (+100), Park Ji-yoon (+100), Jang Jin (+100), Jinyoung (+100); Assistant Detective's Choice: Park Ji-yoon (Juliet Park)
6 Sook Cafe Murder Case	June 2, 2017	Jang Dong-min; Sojin (Girl's Day)	Park Ji-yoon	Kim Min-Gue	Jung Eun-ji (Lady Jung/Nanny Jang)	Arrested: Jung Eun-ji; Won: Park Ji-yoon (+200), Jang Jin (+100), Kim Ji-hoon (+100), Sojin (+100); Assistant Detective's Choice: Jung Eun-ji (Lady Jung/Nanny Jang)
7 The Campsite Murder Case	June 9, 2017	Cha Eun-woo (Astro)	Park Ji-yoon	Kim Min-Gue	Cha Eun-woo (Team Leader Cha Eun-woo)	Arrested: Cha Eun-woo; Won: Park Ji-yoon (+100), Jang Jin (+100), Kim Ji-hoon (+100), Yang Se-hyung (+100), Jung Eun-ji (+100)
8 The Science High School Murder Case	June 16, 2017	Hong Jin-ho	Hong Jin-ho	Kim Min-Gue	Park Ji-yoon	Arrested: Park Ji-yoon; Won: Hong Jin-ho (+200), Jang Jin (+100), Kim Ji-hoon (+100), Yang Se-hyung (+100), Jung Eun-ji (+100)
9 The Mansion Murder Case	June 23, 2017	Hong Jin-ho; Jang Dong-min	Jang Jin	Kim Min-Gue	Hong Jin-ho (Lawyer Hong)	Arrested: Hong Jin-ho; Won: Park Ji-yoon (+100), Yang Se-hyung (+100), Jung Eun-ji (+100), Jang Dong-min (+100)
10; The Hotel Murder Case	June 30, 2017	Hong Jin-ho; Pyo Chang-won; Jang Sung-kyu	Pyo Chang-won	Kim Min-Gue	Jang Jin (Businessman Jang/Yakuza Jang)	Victim: Jang Sung-kyu; Arrested: Park Ji-yoon; Won: Jang Jin (+500)
11; The Island Village Murder Case	July 7, 2017	Hong Jin-ho; Sojin (Girl's Day)	Yang Se-hyung	Kim Min-Gue	Park Ji-yoon (Haenyeo Park)	Arrested: Sojin; Won: Park Ji-yoon (+400)
12; The Crime Scene Writer Murder Case	July 14, 2017	Hong Jin-ho	-	Kim Min-Gue	Jang Jin	Arrested: Jang Jin; Won: Park Ji-yoon (+200), Kim Ji-hoon (+200), Yang Se-hyung (+200), Hong Jin-ho (+200)

==== Crime Scene 3 Awards ====
Category	Winner
Winner	Park Ji-yoon
Runner-up	Yang Se-hyung
3rd Place	Jang Jin
Hard Carry Award	Park Ji-yoon
Relief Pitcher Award	Hong Jin-ho
Self-Sacrifice Award	Kim Ji-hoon
Best Comment Award	Yang Se-hyung
Best Detective Award	Jung Eun-ji
Triangle Detecting Award	Jang Jin
Hard Labor Award	Kim Min-gue (Assistant Detective)

=== Season 4 ===
List of Episodes (0 – 10)

Episode	Title	Broadcast date	Detective	Detective's Assistant	Criminal	Results
0	The Mafia Game (Introduction episode)	January 19, 2024	-	-	-	Won: Mafia Team
1	The Airport Murder Case (공항 살인사건)	February 9, 2024	Park Ji-yoon	Lee Jin-woo	Key (Fiancé Key)	Arrested: An Yu-jin (Stewardess An); Won: Key (+800)
2	The Airport Murder Case (공항 살인사건)	February 9, 2024	Park Ji-yoon	Lee Jin-woo	Key (Fiancé Key)	Arrested: An Yu-jin (Stewardess An); Won: Key (+800)
3	The Gosiwon Murder Case (고시원 살인사건)	February 9, 2024	Key	Lee Jin-woo	Jang Dong-min (Dayworker Jang)	Arrested: Jang Dong-min; Won: Park Ji-yoon (+200), Jang Jin (+200), Key (+100), Joo Hyun-young (+200)
4	The Gosiwon Murder Case (고시원 살인사건)	February 9, 2024	Key	Lee Jin-woo	Jang Dong-min (Dayworker Jang)	Arrested: Jang Dong-min; Won: Park Ji-yoon (+200), Jang Jin (+200), Key (+100), Joo Hyun-young (+200)
5	The Court Murder Case (법원 살인사건)	February 16, 2024	Jang Dong-min	Lee Jin-woo	Joo Hyun-young (Lawyer Joo)	Arrested: Joo Hyun-young; Won: Park Ji-yoon (+200), Jang Jin (+200), An Yu-jin (+200)
6	The Court Murder Case (법원 살인사건)	February 16, 2024	Jang Dong-min	Lee Jin-woo	Joo Hyun-young (Lawyer Joo)	Arrested: Joo Hyun-young; Won: Park Ji-yoon (+200), Jang Jin (+200), An Yu-jin (+200)
7	The Cult Leader Murder Case (교주 살인사건)	February 23, 2024	An Yu-jin	Lee Jin-woo	Jang Dong-min (Doctor Jang)	Arrested: Key (Devotee Key); Won: Jang Dong-min (+500)
8	The Cult Leader Murder Case (교주 살인사건)	February 23, 2024	An Yu-jin	Lee Jin-woo	Jang Dong-min (Doctor Jang)	Arrested: Key (Devotee Key); Won: Jang Dong-min (+500)
9	The Chairman of Fungmu Murder Case (풍무 회장 살인사건)	March 1, 2024	Park Ji-yoon	Lee Jin-woo	An Yu-jin (Kwak Yu-jin)	Arrested: An Yu-jin; Won: Park Ji-yoon (+100), Jang Jin (+200), Jang Dong-min (+200), Joo Hyun-young (+200)
10	The Chairman of Fungmu Murder Case (풍무 회장 살인사건)	March 1, 2024	Park Ji-yoon	Lee Jin-woo	An Yu-jin (Kwak Yu-jin)	Arrested: An Yu-jin; Won: Park Ji-yoon (+100), Jang Jin (+200), Jang Dong-min (+200), Joo Hyun-young (+200)

=== Season 5 ===
List of Episodes (1 – 10)

Episode	Title	Broadcast date	Guest	Detective	Detective's Assistant	Criminal	Results
1	The Abandoned Hospital Murder Case (폐병원 살인사건)	September 23, 2025	Park Sung-woong	Jang Jin	Minhee	Park Ji-yoon (Shaman Park)	Arrested: Park Ji-yoon; Won: Jang Jin (+200), Kim Ji-hoon (+200)
2	The Abandoned Hospital Murder Case (폐병원 살인사건)	September 23, 2025	Park Sung-woong	Jang Jin	Minhee	Park Ji-yoon (Shaman Park)	Arrested: Park Ji-yoon; Won: Jang Jin (+200), Kim Ji-hoon (+200)
3	The Funeral Hall Murder Case (장례식장 살인사건)	September 23, 2025	Joo Hyun-young	An Yu-jin	Minhee	Joo Hyun-young (Daughter-In-Law Joo)	Arrested: Joo Hyun-young; Won: Jang Jin (+200), Jang Dong-min (+200), Kim Ji-hoon (+200), An Yu-jin (+100)
4	The Funeral Hall Murder Case (장례식장 살인사건)	September 23, 2025	Joo Hyun-young	An Yu-jin	Minhee	Joo Hyun-young (Daughter-In-Law Joo)	Arrested: Joo Hyun-young; Won: Jang Jin (+200), Jang Dong-min (+200), Kim Ji-hoon (+200), An Yu-jin (+100)
5	The Hangang Bridge Murder Case (한강교 살인사건)	September 30, 2025	Hwang In-youp	Kim Ji-hoon	Minhee	Hwang In-youp (Billionaire Hwang)	Arrested: Jang Jin (Buddy Jang); Won: Hwang In-youp (+1000)
6	The Hangang Bridge Murder Case (한강교 살인사건)	September 30, 2025	Hwang In-youp	Kim Ji-hoon	Minhee	Hwang In-youp (Billionaire Hwang)	Arrested: Jang Jin (Buddy Jang); Won: Hwang In-youp (+1000)
7	The Nightlife District Murder Case (유흥가 살인사건)	September 30, 2025	Ha Seok-jin	Jang Dong-min	Minhee	An Yu-jin (Dancer An)	Arrested: An Yu-jin; Won: Park Ji-yoon (+200), Jang Jin (+200), Jang Dong-min (+100), Kim Ji-hoon (+200), Ha Seok-jin (+200)
8	The Nightlife District Murder Case (유흥가 살인사건)	September 30, 2025	Ha Seok-jin	Jang Dong-min	Minhee	An Yu-jin (Dancer An)	Arrested: An Yu-jin; Won: Park Ji-yoon (+200), Jang Jin (+200), Jang Dong-min (+100), Kim Ji-hoon (+200), Ha Seok-jin (+200)
9	The Casino Boss Murder Case (카지노 대부 살인사건)	October 7, 2025	Jeon So-min	Park Ji-yoon	Minhee	Jang Dong-min (Monkfish Jang)	Arrested: Jang Dong-min; Won: Park Ji-yoon (+100), Jang Jin (+200), An Yu-jin (+200), Jeon So-min (+200)
10	The Casino Boss Murder Case (카지노 대부 살인사건)	October 7, 2025	Jeon So-min	Park Ji-yoon	Minhee	Jang Dong-min (Monkfish Jang)	Arrested: Jang Dong-min; Won: Park Ji-yoon (+100), Jang Jin (+200), An Yu-jin (+200), Jeon So-min (+200)

== Ratings ==
- As most Korean cable programs rarely reach 1 percent, these ratings are considered a huge success.
- In the ratings below, the highest rating for the show will be in red, and the lowest rating for the show will be in blue.

=== Season 2 ===
Episode	Original airdate	AGB Nielsen
1	April 1, 2015	0.760%
2	April 8, 2015	1.051%
3	April 15, 2015	1.080%
4	April 22, 2015	1.452%
5	April 29, 2015	1.202%
6	May 6, 2015	1.318%
7	May 13, 2015	1.318%
8	May 20, 2015	1.332%
9	May 27, 2015	1.447%
10	June 3, 2015	1.179%
11	June 10, 2015	1.324%
12	June 17, 2015	1.678%
13	June 24, 2015	1.536%

=== Season 3 ===
Episode	Original airdate	AGB Nielsen
0	April 21, 2017	0.807%
1	April 28, 2017	1.143%
2	May 5, 2017	1.703%
3	May 12, 2017	1.900%
4	May 19, 2017	1.365%
5	May 26, 2017	1.226%
6	June 2, 2017	1.566%
7	June 9, 2017	1.437%
8	June 16, 2017	1.583%
9	June 23, 2017	1.399%
10	June 30, 2017	1.568%
11	July 7, 2017	1.806%
12	July 14, 2017	1.478%

== Awards and nominations ==
Name of the award ceremony, year presented, category, nominee(s) of the award, and the result of the nomination
Award ceremony	Year	Category	Recipient(s)	Result	Ref.
Baeksang Arts Awards	2026	Best Technical Achievement – Television	Yoon Jin-hee (Art Direction)	Nominated	
Blue Dragon Series Awards	2024	Best Entertainment Program	Crime Scene Returns	Nominated	
Blue Dragon Series Awards	2024	Best Female Entertainer	Park Ji-yoon	Nominated	
Blue Dragon Series Awards	2024	Best Female Entertainer	Joo Hyun-young	Nominated	
Blue Dragon Series Awards	2024	Whynot Award	An Yu-jin	Won	
TCA Awards	2026	Outstanding International Series – New Category	Crime Scene Zero	Pending	

== International versions ==
Mango TV purchased the rights for a Chinese adaptation of the show, titled Who's the Murderer (明星大侦探), which premiered on March 27, 2016.
