= Lee Hye-sung =

South Korean television presenter

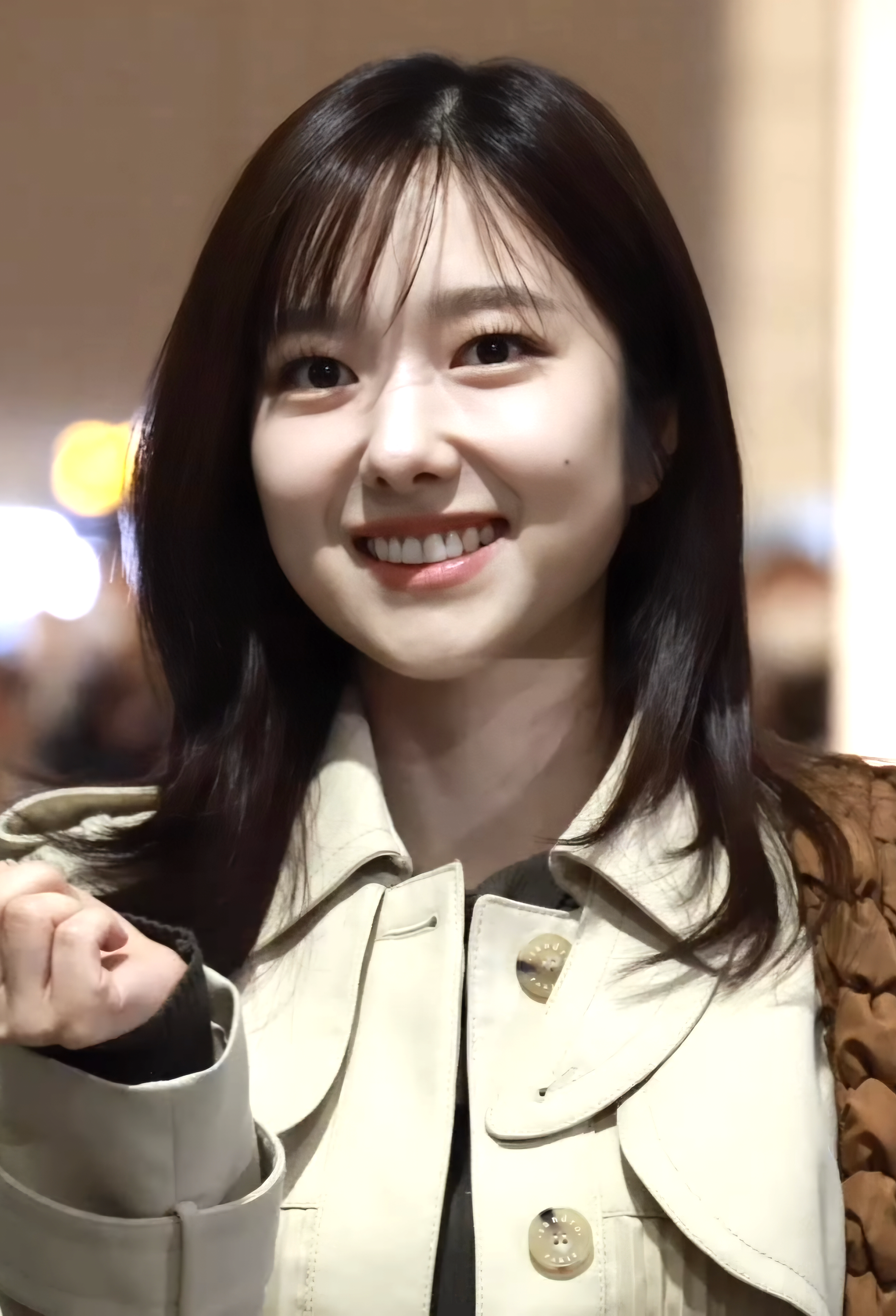
- Lee in November 2024
- Born: November 26, 1992 (age 32); Goyang, Gyeonggi, South Korea
- Education: Seoul National University
- Occupation: Broadcast personality
- Years active: 2016–present

Korean name
- Hangul: 이혜성
- Hanja: 李惠成
- RR: I Hyeseong
- MR: I Hyesŏng

Lee Hye-sung (Korean: 이혜성; born November 26, 1992) is a South Korean television personality. She was formerly an announcer under KBS from October 2016 to May 2020.

== Personal life ==
Lee was in a relationship with Jun Hyun-moo, a former announcer turned broadcast personality and host. The news was revealed through Jun's (and currently Lee's) agency SM Culture & Contents on November 12, 2019. On February 22, 2022 SM Culture & Contents have confirmed that the two have broken up.

== Filmography ==
=== Television series ===
Year	Title	Role	Notes	Ref.
2023	King the Land	an interviewee for new hotelier	Cameo (episode 1)	

=== Web series ===
Year	Title	Role	Notes	Ref.
2023	Celebrity		Cameo	
2024	The Devil's Plan	Cast member		

=== Television shows ===
Year	Title	Role	Notes	Ref.
2018–2019	Who Who is Doing The Best	Host		
2018–2019	Entertainment Weekly	Host		
2018–2019	The Golden Bell Challenge	Host		
2020	King of Mask Singer	Contestant	as Seodang Dog	
2020–2021	It's Ok to be Uncomfortable	Host		
2020–2021	Seol Min-seok's Uncover World History	Cast Member	Season 1	
2021	Wild Wild Quiz	Cast Member		
2021	Our Neighbourhood Class	Cast Member		
2021–present	Uncover World History	Cast Member	Season 2–present	
2021–2022	Mamma Mian	Host		
2021–2022	Korea's Chicken Battle	Judge		
2021–2022	Teacher of Narat	Teacher		

=== Web shows ===
Year	Title	Role	Notes	Ref.
2022	shall we go together?	Host	with Heo Kyung-hwan	
2022	Love Mafia	Host		
2023	The Devils Plan	Player	Netflix	

== Radio Show ==
Year	Title	Network
2019-2020	Fluttering Night, I'm Lee Hye-sung	KBS Cool FM

== Awards and nominations ==
Year	Award	Category	Result
2018	KBS Entertainment Awards	Talk & Show Female Rookie Award	Nominated
