= The Devil's Plan =

2023 South Korean television program

- Promotional poster for season 1
- Hangul: 데블스 플랜
- Lit.: Devil's Plan
- RR: Debeulseu peullaen
- MR: Tebŭlsŭ p'ŭllaen
- Genre: Reality competition
- Directed by: Jung Jong-yeon
- Country of origin: South Korea
- Original language: Korean
- No. of seasons: 3
- No. of episodes: 29

Production
- Production company: TEO

Original release
- Network: Netflix
- Release: September 26, 2023 – present

The Devil's Plan (Korean: 데블스 플랜) is a South Korean reality game show. Contestants play both collaborative and competitive strategy games in order to win a cash prize. Netflix began streaming the first season in September 2023, with the second season airing May 2025. In September 2025, Netflix announced production had begun on the third season. The full cast lineup of the third season was revealed on October 7, 2026, and on October 13, the season's release date of November 10 was released via Instagram.

== Season 1 (2023) ==
=== Format ===
Twelve celebrity contestants are initially given one "Piece". Pieces can be won and lost in the two daily matches: the Main Match and the Prize Match. Pieces can also be traded between players or spent on in-game benefits. A player with no Pieces is eliminated immediately.

After the competitive Main Match, two of the surviving players with the fewest Pieces are sent to prison until the next Main Match. In case of a tie, the player or players with the most Pieces decide who is sent to "Prison". The collaborative Prize Match determines whether a sum of money—₩50,000,000 or ₩100,000,000—is added to the final pot, which can total up to ₩500,000,000.

Games featured include social deduction games, board games, card games and abstract strategy games like nine men's morris. Main Matches typically see players forming alliances, while the Prize Matches test skills including memorization, numerical calculation and visualization.

Combining three different types of pieces forms an octahedron-like shape from which a clue can be read. Using this clue on a hidden safe in the Prison unlocks a special individual challenge, a variant of Gomoku in which the player must remember the colour of each piece, in which the player can win 10 Pieces but risk elimination from the game.

=== Gameplay ===
Besides the first main match, players ending with a total piece count lower than one were eliminated. The 2 players with the least amount of Pieces at the end of each Main Match were sent to prison. If more than two players were eligible for prison then the player(s) with the most Pieces chose who went to prison from the eligible players.

==== Day 1 Main Match: The Virus Game ====
Players randomly selected a number dictating the order they would select a card from twelve laid out inside the dealer room. Each card had a role on it which the player would be. The roles were:

- Terrorist (tries to kill all citizens and neutrals, except the citizen with the antidote). Each terrorist has one bullet, which they can use to kill one player. Each terrorist also has one virus, with which they can infect one player, and the virus spreads through the number order: each round, players with adjacent numbers (based on the numbers selected at the start of the game; 1 and 12 are considered adjacent) will spread the virus to each other if one is infected. Players infected with the virus are killed if not cured within two rounds. Each player has one chance to privately check whether or not they are infected. Terrorists are also given an antidote that they can use to cure one player. The terrorists gain four pieces if they succeed. There are two terrorists, and they will learn each other's identities.
- Fanatic (tries to get killed by the terrorists or virus). Unlike popular social deduction games such as Among Us, there is no voting to eliminate players. Depending on how early the fanatic gets killed, they receive varying amounts of pieces: they gain three pieces for dying in the first round, two for dying in the second or third round, one for dying in the fourth, and none if they die any later or survive the game. There is only one fanatic, and they are considered neutral, i.e. neither a citizen nor terrorist.
- Officer (tries to kill the terrorists). The officer gets one bullet each round, and gets varying amounts of pieces depending on how successful they are: they gain four pieces for killing both terrorists by the second round, three pieces for doing so by the third round, two pieces by the fourth, etc. There is only one officer. The officer is considered neutral, but if both terrorists are killed, each citizen gains one piece, plus one additional piece if they survive the game.
- Ordinary Citizen (tries to eliminate the terrorists) is unable to do very much besides observe, as they have no special abilities. One of the ordinary citizens contains antibodies to the virus, without their knowing, that grant them immunity from the virus. They can still receive and spread the virus, but will be cured automatically by the next round. There are five ordinary citizens.
- Researcher (tries to develop antidote using the citizen with the antidote). The researchers do not know who carries it, and may choose one person each round with whom they will attempt a development mission. If the development mission is successful, i.e. the researcher chooses the player with the antibodies, the development process continues for the cure. Two successful development missions are needed for the cure to be complete. If they succeed, the citizens win the game, and each gain one piece, plus one additional piece if they survive the game, plus one additional piece for each researcher. There are two researchers, and they learn each other's identities.
- Journalist (tries to eliminate the terrorists). The journalist can investigate one player each round, and discover their identity, though information regarding the antibodies will not be revealed. They can then relay the information to the officer (whose identity is hidden), who can then kill one of the terrorists. There is one journalist.

Each round lasts roughly 30 minutes, and the game ends until one side wins. At the end of each round, the researchers' progress in developing the cure, the number of infected players (though not their identities), and any deaths that round will be publicly revealed. Any player that dies will be confined to the dealer's room, and their identity is publicly announced, though information regarding the antibodies is not revealed.

In the turnout of the round, the terrorists won (Guillaume Patry and Lee Si-Won), with Lee Si-Won having been killed by the officer (Ha Seok-Jin), due to information from the journalist (Kyeong-Rim Park). The fanatic (Kim Dong-Jae) was also killed by Ha Seok-Jin, and earned one piece. The researchers (Seo Dong-Joo and Boo Seung-Kwan) failed to create the cure. The terrorists received four pieces each, and the fanatic received one piece. However, the terrorists each gave Dong-jae one piece for his help in their victory.

==== Day 1 Prize Match: Cooperative Puzzle ====
After every main match came a prize match where, if the players won, either ₩50,000,000 or ₩100,000,000 would be added to the prize pot. For the first prize match, players stood on a roundabout that would spin around for three minutes, with ten sectors on it, with one player standing in each, positioned according to the numbers they draw at the start of the game. Each player was in front of the puzzle for six seconds, with the roundabout making three rotations. The puzzles showed an empty geometrical shape, and players were given smaller shapes outside of the puzzle that they had to put in the puzzle correctly, continuing where the previous player had left off. If the players completed all ten rounds, then ₩50,000,000 was added to the prize pot. If even one round was unsuccessful, no money was added.

Once the puzzle was solved, the roundabout stopped, and the player in front of the puzzle was considered to have solved it. If a player solved the puzzle twice, then they received one piece for every next puzzle solved, e.g. a player that solved three puzzles earned two pieces.

The prize match failed: the eighth round was unsuccessful. Kim Dong-jae gained two pieces, and Kwak Joon-bin gained one piece.

==== Day 2 Main Match: Rules Race ====
For the second match, players were required to create specific personal rules only applying to themselves for a board game following certain criteria. The players went in an order based on the amount of characters each player's rule had. Players rolled a die with sides depicting one, one, two, three, prison and escape prison. There are four offices scattered throughout, and if a player lands on one, they can gain an escape prison card, roll again, or change the group rule, which applies to everyone. There is also a 'special die' which has sides one, two, two, three, three, and three, but is only used when a special rule is activated. If a player lands in an office due to a group rule, they receive no benefits. The first player to cross the finish line receives three pieces, second two, and third one. The tenth person to cross the finish line has to return one piece, eleventh three, and twelfth five.

During the planning stages, the players split into two factions. The majority team had a strategy that involved accumulating Escape Tickets, which proved to be a major factor in the game.

In the end, the majority team's strategy proved most effective, and the final placements were determined by luck. Park Kyung-lim finished 10th, and lost one piece. Kim Dong-jae finished 11th and lost three pieces. Guillaume Patry finished 12th and lost five pieces, which eliminated him from the game.

==== Day 2 Prize Match: Fragments of Memory ====
For the second prize match, players were tasked to observe a hospital scene, of which they would answer questions about. For the questions, (10 in total) the players went into the Dealer Room, where they would wait while one player answered questions. The player answering could either:

1) Pass, which resulted in the player leaving the main area, and another player would come in, or

2) Answer, which, if correct, would let them answer another question. If the question is answered incorrect, the prize match would end in failure. Players needed to answer all ten questions correct to win ₩100,000,000 in prize money.

The first player (Lee Si-Won) chose to pass, believing she would still have an opportunity to answer the following questions. However, this caused her to exit the game.

The second player (Seo Dong-joo) answered all ten questions correctly, and the prize match ended in success.

==== Day 3 Main Match: Secret Number ====
For the third main match, players each have a secret number between 1 and 100. Players gain clues about their own and others' secret numbers by joining another player private room and submitting a ticket to gain information about the combination of their numbers. Points are awarded based on players accurately guessing each players' secret numbers, including their own, and for keeping their own number secret. A large alliance on players, led by ORBIT (궤도) conspired to eliminate Kim Dong-jae using player Seo Yu-min (who had allied herself with Kim Dong-jae), as they considered him a threat to their majority alliance, and they successfully targeted Kim Dong-Jae, ending in his elimination. Lee Hye-seong, who had also chosen to ally herself with Kim Dong-jae, was eliminated as a result of Seo Yu-min's betrayal.

==== Day 3 Prize Match: Word Tower ====
For the third prize match, the group of players is given a tower of wooden letter blocks and a category. They must use the blocks to assemble as many English words in the category as there are players, while using up all blocks.

The prize match ended in success, and so ₩100,000,000 was added to the prize pot.

==== Day 4 Main Match: Zoo ====
In the fourth main match, players seek to fill a 5x5 grid with a pattern of animal tiles that suit their personal winning condition. Each player has a secret sequence of three animals out of five possible, as well as a condition card specifying that one animal will appear in the grid more times than another animal (ex: more lions than monkeys). Players are then given a limited set of chips to bid during auctions that allow them to place tiles on the grid. In each round, there are two lots on which players could bid, each containing specific animal tiles. The lot on which the fewest chips are bid is used, and the player that bids the most chips decides where on the grid the animal tiles are placed.

==== Day 4 Prize Match: Scale Game ====
In the fourth prize match, players are separated into groups of two to three and placed in separate rooms. They must jointly determine the mass of five differently colored blocks that each weigh between 1g and 20g. In turn, each room may add cubes to virtual scales. All rooms will see whether the actions result in the scale tilting one way, the other, or being balanced. When the scale is balanced, players have an opportunity to guess the five weights. One value is given to start. The prize match failed.

==== Day 5 Main Match: Laying Grass ====
The fifth main match is played on a 30x30 grid. Players play take turns selecting polyominos to add to their territory. Each piece must touch one of their existing polyominos and may not touch any other player's territory. Players who surround key squares gain beneficial actions such as the ability to steal from or block another player.

Pieces are awarded or deducted according to the largest complete square within the player's territory. A maximum square of 5x5 is the expected standard, and players that achieve it will neither gain nor lose pieces. Players with a larger maximum square will gain pieces based on the size of the square: a 6x6 square earns one piece, a 7x7 square earns two pieces, etc. Players with a smaller maximum square will lose pieces based on the size of the square: a 4x4 square deducts one piece, a 3x3 square deducts two pieces, etc.

In a betrayal by Ha Seok-jin, Cho Yeon-woo was eliminated at the end of this match.

==== Day 5 Prize Match: Montage ====
In the fifth prize match, players watch a slideshow of portrait photos. Each shows for 3 seconds. As soon as a duplicate photo is shown, at least one player must buzz in. This player will gain a piece. Ten erroneous buzzes will end the prize match in failure. However, if all players fail to buzz in when the duplicate photo is shown, the prize match ends in failure immediately.

Despite accumulating seven incorrect buzzes, four in the first round and two in the second, the players were successful, and so ₩100,000,000 was added to the pot. Seo Yu-min and Seo Dong-joo each gained one Piece, while Park Kyeong-Rim gained three.

==== Day 6 Main Match: Equation High-Low ====
Players use number and mathematical operator cards to form equations. The mathematical operators include addition, subtraction, division, multiplication and square roots, the former three being provided to players at the beginning. The number cards range from 0 to 9, and have four colors: gold, silver, bronze and dirt, from highest to lowest. There is one card for each combination of color and number.

They bet on whether they can form a result closest to 20 or closest to 1. Bets are made in the style of Poker, and once all participating players have made the same bet, they form their equations. If all participating players bet on the same target, the closest player wins the pot. Otherwise, the closest to 20 and the closest to 1 split the pot. Ties are broken in favor of the player with the highest (for 20) or lowest (for 1) number card. If this is still a tie, the colors of these numbers decide the higher or lower card.

All players' pieces are converted to chips before the game starts, and players are eliminated when they run out of chips until three players remain. Ha Seok-jin, ORBIT, and Seo Dong-joo were the three surviving players.

==== Day 6 Prize Match: Four Player Three in a Row ====
Players Ha Seok-jin, ORBIT, and Seo Dong-joo are separated into individual rooms to play a three-in-a-row game against each other and an unknown fourth player. In each game, the colors are assigned based on a set procedure not shared with the players. Players succeed when the prevent the unknown fourth player from winning by setting starting positions only known to the three players. However, after ORBIT made a mistake in identifying Seo Dong-joo as the impostor, Seo Dong-joo was eliminated, and the two players with the most pieces at the end of the match (ORBIT and Ha Seok-jin) proceed to the final.

==== Final Match ====
The final match comprises three 1:1 games: Nine Men's Morris, Hexagon, and one game that was unplayed. Whichever player is the first to win two games becomes the winner of The Devil's Plan. Ha Seok Jin won the first two games.

==== Secret Chamber ====
In the prison's Secret Chamber, players faced a locked safe secured by a four-digit code. By assembling three different Pieces into an octahedron, Ha Seok-jin deciphered the clue "Next Year" and correctly entered 2024. The challenge inside was Blind Gomoku: players placed one-sided tiles face-down on a board and had to remember which tiles belonged to them versus their opponent's. Lee Si-won attempted the game first on Night 5 but failed, losing all her Pieces and leading to her elimination. The following morning, Ha Seok-jin completed the challenge successfully and was awarded 10 additional Pieces.

=== Contestants ===
Most of the contestants are singers, actors or entertainers.

Name	Age	Occupation
Kwak Joon-bin (곽준빈)	31	YouTuber
ORBIT	40	Astronomer, Science Communicator, Blue House's former policy advisor
Guillaume Patry (기욤 패트리)	41	Esports Player
Kim Dong-jae (김동재)	24	College student and pro poker player
Park Kyeong-rim (박경림)	44	TV personality
Seo Dong-joo (서동주)	40	US-based lawyer
Seo Yoo-min (서유민)	31	American orthopedic surgeon
Boo Seung-kwan (부승관)	25	Singer
Lee Si-won (이시원)	36	Actress
Lee Hye-sung (이혜성)	30	Freelance announcer
Cheo Yeon-woo	34	Professional Go Player
Ha Seok-jin (하석진)	41	Actor

=== Episodes ===
No.	Title	Original release date
1	"Episode 1"	September 26, 2023
2	"Episode 2"	September 26, 2023
3	"Episode 3"	September 26, 2023
4	"Episode 4"	September 26, 2023
5	"Episode 5"	October 3, 2023
6	"Episode 6"	October 3, 2023
7	"Episode 7"	October 3, 2023
8	"Episode 8"	October 3, 2023
9	"Episode 9"	October 3, 2023
10	"Episode 10"	October 10, 2023
11	"Episode 11"	October 10, 2023
12	"Episode 12"	October 10, 2023

=== Eliminations and numbers of pieces ===
Contestant	Day 1	Game 1	Day 2	Game 2	Day 3	Game 3	Day 4	Game 4	Night 4	Day 5	Game 5	Night 5	Day 6	Game 6	Night 6	Final
Ha Seok-jin (하석진)	1	1	2	5	3	3	4	3	3	3	2	2	13	16	22	Winner
ORBIT (재혁)	1	1	1	3	2	3	3	2	2	3	4	4	4	11	14	Runner-up
Seo Dong-joo (서동주)	1	1	2	2	2	3	3	4	4	3	4	6	6	11	11	
Kwak Joon-bin (곽준빈)	1	1	1	1	2	2	2	3	4	4	3	4	4	0		
Seo Yoo-min (서유민)	1	1	1	2	2	2	3	3	3	3	5	6	6	0		
Boo Seung-kwan (부승관)	1	1	1	1	1	2	2	1	1	1	3	3	3	0		
Park Kyung-lim (박경림)	1	1	2	1	1	2	3	4	3	3	3	4	4	0		
Lee Si-won (이시원)	1	5	4	2	3	2	2	1	1	2	2	0				
Cheo Yeon-woo (조연우)	1	1	1	1	1	1	1	2	2	2	0					
Kim Dong-jae (김동재)	1	2	5	2	3	0										
Lee Hye-sung (이혜성)	1	1	1	1	1	0										
Guillaume Patry (기욤 패트리)	1	5	4	0												

=== Prison ===
Round 1	Round 2	Round 3	Round 4	Round 5
Park Kyung-lim (박경림)	Boo Seung-kwan (부승관)	Kwak Joon-bin (곽준빈)	Boo Seung-kwan (부승관)	Ha Seok-jin (하석진)
Seo Yoo-min (서유민)	Cheo Yeon-woo (조연우)	Cheo Yeon-woo (조연우)	Lee Si-won (이시원)	Lee Si-won (이시원)

Color key
The contestant solved the prison puzzle and earned an extra piece.
The contestant uncovered the secret chamber, lost, and was eliminated from the game.
The contestant uncovered the secret chamber, won, and earned 10 pieces.

== Season 2: Death Room (2025) ==
Netflix began streaming the second season on 6 May 2025.

=== Gameplay ===
Beyond the main match, players who finish with fewer than one Piece are immediately eliminated. The gameplay differs slightly from Season 1. The prize pot increases based on goals scored during the main match. After the main match, players are split into two groups based on their total Piece count: the upper half with the most Pieces stay overnight in the living space, while the lower half with fewer Pieces must spend the night in prison. If multiple players tie with the same number of Pieces that exceed the capacity of the prison, those with higher Piece counts among them get to choose who joins them in the living space. Players sent to prison must compete in a nighttime "Prison Match" held in the Death Room within the prison, where one player is eliminated.

==== Day 1 Main Match: Crooked Cops ====
The game is a strategic battle between thieves and cops on a board modeled after the Seoul subway system. Thieves aim to collect hidden Pieces from 28 of the 176 stations without being caught, while cops try to identify and arrest them using limited clues and communication. The game ends if either side achieves their goal, or after 15 rounds; whichever comes first.

Roles are assigned randomly:

- Thieves: Work together to collect at least twelve Pieces while avoiding capture. They know who the corrupt cops are. If they collect twelve pieces within 15 rounds, they are successful. There are two thieves, and their identities are public. The number of pieces they have collected is revealed every five rounds.
- Regular Cops: Divided into three color-coded teams—Red, Blue, and Green—tasked with catching thieves within 15 rounds. Each cop has a number within their team, determining their playing order. There are ten ordinary cops.
- Corrupt Cops: Hidden within two of the three teams (2 total). Their role is to secretly assist the thieves and avoid detection by their fellow officers. They know each other's identities, and the thieves know their identities as well.

Cops are separated into different rooms by team, though may leave and receive updates via radio. Both cops and thieves can move up to two stations per round, with cops gathering clues based on thief movements. The corrupt cops are given the locations of the thieves each round, and each cop's location is public.

At the start of the game, each player chooses their starting point. Thieves cannot start at a station with a piece. The location of pieces is revealed to the thieves, but not to the cops.

Rounds begin with the thieves moving; they have three minutes to do so. Then, each round has a set order for the three teams, and in their numerical order, the players in each team have five minutes to move up to two stations each. At a station, a cop may investigate the station, revealing if a thief has passed it, and which one if so, or they may attempt an arrest. If a thief is on that particular space, they will be arrested, and lose the pieces they have gathered. They cannot then gain more pieces, nor continue moving across the board. Arrests made by corrupt cops will automatically be undone, and publicly so. The exact circumstances of this are unclear, as no successful arrests were made by corrupt cops.

A team that successfully arrests a thief will gain a piece each per thief. However, an ordinary cop that is later falsely accused of corruption will not gain any pieces at all, even if their team arrests a thief.

Arrests, successful or not, are publicly announced. Successful investigations may be shared between teams, though the investigating team may lie about which thief passed the station, or falsely share a clue. The station cannot be falsified.

After the game's end, each team votes on who among them is a corrupt cop. If they successfully vote out a corrupt cop from their team, the ordinary cops on a team will each gain a piece. If they vote out an ordinary cop, they gain no additional pieces, and the falsely accused cop gains no pieces at all. Cops may also vote "None", and if the majority on a team do so, no cop is voted out from the team, but no additional pieces will be awarded to them, even if they are correct in that there are no corrupt cops on their team.

For the prize mission, if the game ends within ten rounds, ₩100,000,000 is added to the prize pot. Each additional round will deduct ₩20,000,000, e.g. if the game ends on Round 12, ₩60,000,000 is added.

The game concluded with a victory for the thieves, Yoon So-hui and Tinno, who collected 12 Pieces without being caught, aided by corrupt cops Kyuhyun and Jeong Hyun-gyu, who were on the Blue and Green teams respectively. As neither corrupt cop was caught and neither thief arrested, each of these four players was rewarded with 3 extra Pieces. The game ended on Round 11, so ₩80,000,000 was added to the prize pot.

Although there were no corrupt cops on the Red team, Tinno, Kyuhyun and 7high had communicated prior to the game, and a deal was made that 7high's team, the Red team, would help the thieves succeed, and the thieves and corrupt cops, having the most pieces if the plan worked, would choose three players from the Red team to join them in the living area. However, this deal was broken by the thieves and corrupt cops, who selected 7high and Park Sang-yeon from the Red team, but also Lee Se-dol from the green team to join the living space, so as not to turn six other players against them. However, having mistakenly convinced the Blue team that Kyuhyun was not a corrupt cop, Lee Se-dol chose to go to prison instead, giving his spot to Kang Ji-young from the Blue team.

==== Day 1 Prison Match: Remove One ====
Players each receive a deck of cards numbered 1 to 8 and secretly choose two cards to reveal simultaneously. They then submit one of these cards using hidden markers. The player who submits the lowest unique number wins the round and earns the number of points on the card, plus a victory token. After each round, played cards are discarded, and fresh decks are given every six rounds. Cards that are revealed but not played cannot be used the following round. Until the last six rounds, the player with the most points after each three-round cycle is exempt from elimination and can return to prison. Ties are broken in favor of the player with the most victory tokens, and if this remains a tie, the player who more recently won a round is saved. After 18 rounds, among the final three players, the one with the most points earns one Piece, and the player with the fewest points is eliminated.

In the Prison Match, Kim Ha-rin won a Piece, while Chuu was eliminated.

==== Day 2 Main Match: Unknown ====
Players compete on a board of colorful numbered squares, aiming to be the first to move their cube to the center square. The cube's faces are red, yellow, green, blue, purple and white, as are the spaces across the board, though the starting spaces are gray. Players may choose their starting spaces, but cannot share a space at any point in the game. The twist lies in discovering hidden rules during gameplay, which may include special movement conditions or the ability to move or sabotage other players' cubes. The game is preceded by a practice game with the same hidden rules, giving players a chance to work out hidden rules for the real game. During the real game, a hidden rule is revealed each round in a predetermined order. Staff members may not answer questions from players that would reveal these rules until they are officially revealed, even if players have worked out these rules.

If certain conditions are fulfilled, up to two players can be eliminated, and the prize mission requires that exactly one player be eliminated for ₩100,000,000 to be added to the pot.

The first player to reach the center wins the game and is awarded 3 Pieces. Remaining players are ranked based on the numbers on the squares where their cubes end up: the remaining four players on the highest-numbered squares each gain one piece.

In this match, Kang Ji-young reached the center and earned 3 Pieces, while 7high, Lee Se-dol, Justin Min, and Yoon So-hui each earned one piece. No players were eliminated, so no money was added to the pot.

==== Day 2 Prison Match: Time Auction ====
In this game, each player is given a total of 10 minutes to manage across 19 bidding rounds. At the start of each round, players press a concealed button in front of them. Players that do not wish to participate in a round must remove their hand within five seconds. While holding the button, their personal time bank begins to count down, and they may release it at any moment to stop the bid. The player who holds the button the longest in each round—thus spending the most time—wins a victory token. Timing is strategic, as players must conserve their limited 10-minute total across all rounds.

At the end of Round 19, the player with the fewest victory tokens is eliminated from the game. The player with the most is awarded 1 Piece. Ties are broken in favor of whichever player has more time remaining.

In this match, Kim Ha-rin won the most victory tokens and received 1 Piece, while Park Sang-yeon had the fewest and was eliminated.

==== Day 3 Main Match: Halloween Monster ====
In this game, players form alliances and use weapon cards to defeat monsters on a shared battlefield, earning victory points. Each player starts with a dagger and can join an unchangeable alliance of up to three members. Players use their daggers, which deal 3 damage to a monster, and other weapon cards to attack monster cards, which grant points when defeated to the player that delivers the final blow. The special weapon cards are as follows:

- Poison, which will cause monsters to lose one victory point each turn.
- Ice, which will prevent the monster from being attacked until the player's next turn.
- Dual Swords, which can either deal 2 damage each to two monsters, or 4 damage to one.
- Grenade, which deals 6 damage to a monster.
- Bomb, which deals 10 damage on the player's next turn.

Monsters' current numbers of victory points are not revealed, but the deaths of monsters are revealed at the end of each round.

Alliance points are totaled and evenly split among members, while solo players keep their own points. The highest-scoring players collectively earn 6 Pieces.

The Prize Mission required a player's elimination; Choi Hyun-joon exploited a secret rule about vulnerable attack positions to eliminate Lee Se-dol from the game: positions 10 and 11 can be attacked. Kyuhyun, Yoon So-hui, and Tinno secured the highest scores and each received 2 Pieces.

==== Day 3 Prison Match: Sniper Hold'em ====
Sniper Hold'em is based on Texas Hold'em where players start with 60 chips and aim to reach 75 chips to avoid elimination. Each round involves betting around four revealed community cards, with hands ranked from Four Card to High Card. A unique twist allows players to "snipe" — predict and block a specific winning hand combination. If successful, the blocked hand is disqualified, and the next best hand wins, enabling strategic victories with weaker hands. Players who reach 75 chips return to prison and are safe from elimination. In this match, Kim Ha-rin failed to reach 75 chips and was eliminated from the game.

==== Day 4 Main Match: Treasure Island ====
Treasure Island is played on an 81-square board featuring obstacles like fences, water, and walls. Players search for a hidden treasure box by exploring ten scattered clue boxes, which they unlock by placing directional arrows connecting red dots—these arrows are acquired through auctions. Each clue box grants points, and players with 20 points or fewer at the end face penalties of losing Pieces.

In this round, Yoon So-hui found the treasure box, earning the right to steal 4 Pieces from any player. Kyuhyun, Tinno, and Jeong Hyun-gyu had the highest points but, ending with the same number of Pieces, one had to be sent to prison. Choi Hyun-joon, holding the most Pieces, sent Tinno to prison. Justin H. Min scored exactly 20 points, lost 1 Piece as a penalty, and was eliminated after losing all his Pieces.

==== Day 4 Prison Match: Triple Dice ====
This game involves players rolling nine visible white dice and two hidden dice—one red and one blue—rolled privately in a dice tower. Each player forms a combination of three dice, which may include the hidden dice represented by question-mark tokens in their colors. After all submissions, hidden dice are revealed, and combinations are ranked from best to worst: triple, straight, double, and single. Players earn points each round based on their hand's rank: 6 for first, 3 for second, 1 for third, and 0 for last. A twist requires players to secretly predict their round score before revealing their hands. Correct predictions double the player's points; correctly predicting zero grants 40 points. At the end, Kang Ji-young earned the most points and received 1 Piece, while Tinno scored lowest and was eliminated.

==== Day 5 Main Match: Balance Mancala ====
In this radial mancala-style game, players collect three different colored points by placing counters around the board in turn. The final counter placed each round determines which player earns points. Each player tracks three separate color scores, and their final score is determined by the lowest of the three totals. The player with the lowest final score must give 4 Pieces to the highest-scoring player.

No player reached the required 15-point threshold, so everyone was penalized by losing half of their Pieces. Kyuhyun, who had the lowest score, was forced to give his remaining 4 Pieces to Son Eun-yu, resulting in his elimination. Jeong Hyun-gyu, who was at risk of being sent to prison due to his low Piece count, activated the Hidden Stage Prize and was immediately awarded 10 Pieces, allowing him to evade prison.

==== Day 5 Prison Match: Wall Go ====
In this game, players take turns building walls on a Go board to enclose their counters within the largest possible territory. Each turn involves placing or moving a counter and constructing an adjacent wall. The game ends when all players' counters are fully enclosed in separate territories. The player with the largest territory wins 1 Piece and is exempt from elimination. The remaining two players compete in a rematch under the same rules, with the smaller territory loser being eliminated. In this match, Son Eun-yu secured the largest territory and earned 1 Piece. Kang Ji-young lost the rematch against 7high and was eliminated.

==== Day 6 Main Match: Doubt and Bet ====
In this game, players must predict the color and quantity of a chosen color card across all players' slots, either building on or challenging previous predictions. Each player starts with five randomly dealt colored cards placed in front of them. The cards can be red, yellow, green, blue, purple, or rainbow; rainbow cards act as one of each color. Bets are made using either Pieces or slot chips — the latter sacrificing one of the player's card slots. On their turn, a player names a color and a quantity as a bet. The next player can either accept the prediction and make their own with a higher number of cards, or doubt the prediction and challenge the bettor. If they doubt, they can call and bet the same number of Pieces, or raise and bet a higher number. The bettor can then call, raise or fold, similarly to in Poker, until one player folds, in which case the other wins the pot, or both players make an equal bet, in which case all cards are revealed. If the prediction is false, the challenger wins the pot; if it's correct, the bettor claims it.

Starting from the end of Round 15, each player forfeits a piece every five rounds. The game continues until three players remain.

In this match, Son Eun-yu and 7high lost all their slots and Pieces, resulting in elimination. Yoon So-hui, who finished with the most Pieces, advanced to the final.

==== Day 6 Prison Match: Equation Pyramid ====
In the final elimination match, the remaining two players, Choi Hyun-joon and Jeong Hyun-gyu, were sent to prison to compete for the last spot in the final. The game involved selecting 3 out of 10 numbered squares on a board and combining them using arithmetic operations to form an equation that matched a given target number. Players scored points based on how accurately and efficiently they reached the target. Jeong Hyun-gyu earned the most points, securing his place in the final and a stay in the living space on the final night. Choi Hyun-joon lost the match and was eliminated.

==== Final Match ====
The final match is a best-of-three format, featuring three 1:1 games between Jeong Hyun-gyu and Yoon So-hui. The first player to win two games is crowned the winner of The Devil's Plan: Death Room.

- Big Small: A game of chance and deduction. The dealer draws a face-up card (1–10). The first player then draws a face-down card from their own deck. The opponent must predict whether the first player's card is bigger or smaller than the dealer's by betting chips. Jeong Hyun-gyu won this round.
- Bagh Chal: A traditional abstract strategy game from Nepal. Each player competes in two simultaneous matches — one as the goat, trying to occupy the board without being eaten, and one as the tiger, attempting to capture goats by jumping over them. Yoon So-hui won this round by being the first to achieve victory.
- Question and Truth: Players are given a deck of cards and ten tokens. They secretly arrange eight cards, and the objective is to guess the opponent's full combination. Tokens are spent to ask questions about the opponent's setup (the opponent cannot lie) or to attempt to guess the opponent's full combination; the player that spends more will be able to do so. The exact number of tokens the opponent has is not revealed, but it will be publicly announced when a player has five tokens or fewer, and when they exceed five once again. Jeong Hyun-gyu correctly deduced the combination and won the round.

With two victories, Jeong Hyun-gyu was declared the winner of The Devil's Plan: Death Room.

==== Hidden Stages ====
Players in both the living space and prison have the opportunity to discover a secret chamber in each location. Only one player can enter the chamber to play a special game, which offers a chance to win rewards or risk elimination.

- Living Space Hidden Stage: The Knight's Tour: Kyuhyun discovered that the bedside clocks in the living area didn't work, and found a code-wheel on the inside with Latin letters. The clock also contained a die with "Juliet" written across the faces, indicating that the solution to the code-wheel was "Romeo". Opening the wheel revealed a wrench, and a note reading, "Make the birds perched in the trees fly away." This indicated the removal of a panel in the gymnasium, revealing four slots in a pattern matching that on the Pieces. When a Piece was held partially in the correct slot, the pattern created the English word "INSERT," and placing the Piece in the slot unlocked access to a secret game room, and returned the Piece. Only one player may enter per discovery, and while failure in the challenge does not result in elimination, it requires the forfeiture of all Pieces except one. The challenge was a version of the Knight's tour, a classic chess puzzle where the player must move a knight to every square on a 6×6, 7×7, and 8×8 grid exactly once, following standard chess rules. On Night 2, Jeong Hyun-gyu completed all three stages successfully and was awarded 10 Pieces, which he could claim at any time during the game.
- Prison Hidden Stage: During Night 1, imprisoned players discovered a manhole lid under the floorboards, with a central hole marked with the Chinese character for "water". When water was poured in the hole, a ball floated to the top, reading, "always coming but never arrives". The prison door's loose handle acted as a wrench that turned bolts on the manhole lid to read "Tomorrow", opening the manhole and revealing a chamber that allowed one player at a time to attempt a high-risk game for a reward or face elimination. Lee Seung-hyun entered first, expecting a challenge involving the Knight's tour, but failed the differing challenge and was eliminated. On Night 2, Choi Hyun-joon attempted the same game, which required opening a safe by locating a key hidden in a deep well that gradually filled with water over 10 minutes. Clues were provided through bricks displaying various images, and Choi deduced he needed to press those whose English names started with the letters in the phrase "FIND THE KEY." He succeeded with one minute to spare and was awarded 10 Pieces.

=== Contestants ===
Most of the contestants are again in the entertainment industry.

Name	Age	Occupation
Lee Sedol (이세돌)	41	Former Go Player
Justin H. Min	35	Actor
Kyuhyun (규현)	36	Singer
Kang Ji-young (강지영)	35	TV presenter for JTBC
Yoon So-hee (윤소희)	31	Actress
7high	37	Poker player, DJ, producer
Lee Seung-hyun (이승현)	26	Miss Korea 2022, college student majoring in economics
Jeong Hyun-gyu (정현규)	26	Influencer, college student majoring in physical education
Choi Hyun-joon (최현준)	26	Model, college student majoring in mathematics
Chuu (츄)	25	Singer
Kim Ha-rin (김하린)	25	Plastic surgeon
Park Sang-yeon (박상연)	20	Physics Olympiad Gold Medallist
Son Eun-yoo (손은유)	29	Mergers and acquisitions lawyer
Tinno (티노)	42	Board Games master, YouTuber

=== Episodes ===
No.	Title	Original release date
1	"Episode 1"	May 6, 2025
2	"Episode 2"	May 6, 2025
3	"Episode 3"	May 6, 2025
4	"Episode 4"	May 6, 2025
5	"Episode 5"	May 13, 2025
6	"Episode 6"	May 13, 2025
7	"Episode 7"	May 13, 2025
8	"Episode 8"	May 13, 2025
9	"Episode 9"	May 13, 2025
10	"Episode 10"	May 20, 2025
11	"Episode 11"	May 20, 2025
12	"Episode 12"	May 20, 2025

=== Eliminations and numbers of pieces ===
Contestant	Start	Main Match 1	Prison Match 1	Night 1	Main Match 2	Prison Match 2	Night 2	Main Match 3	Prison Match 3	Main Match 4	Prison Match 4	Main Match 5	Prison Match 5	Main Match 6	Prison Match 6	Final
Jeong Hyun-gyu (정현규)	1	4	N/A	4	4	N/A	4 (14)	4 (14)	N/A	8 (18)	N/A	14	N/A	11	11	Winner (11)
Yoon So-hee (윤소희)	1	4	N/A	4	5	N/A	6	6	N/A	11	N/A	6	N/A	14	N/A	Runner-up (14)
Choi Hyun-joon (최현준)	1	1	1	1	1	1	11	11	N/A	13	N/A	7	N/A	6	0	
7high	1	1	N/A	1	2	N/A	2	4	4	2	2	1	2	0		
Son Eun-yoo (손은유)	1	1	1	1	1	2	2	2	2	2	2	5	4	0		
Kang Ji-young (강지영)	1	1	N/A	1	4	N/A	4	4	4	3	4	2	0			
Kyuhyun (규현)	1	4	N/A	4	4	N/A	4	9	N/A	8	N/A	0				
Tinno (티노)	1	4	N/A	4	4	N/A	6	6	N/A	8	0					
Justin H. Min	1	1	1	1	2	2	2	1	1	0						
Kim Ha-rin (김하린)	1	1	2	2	2	3	3	3	0							
Lee Sedol (이세돌)	1	1	1	1	2	2	2	0								
Park Sang-yeon (박상연)	1	1	N/A	1	1	0										
Lee Seung-hyun (이승현)	1	1	1	0												
Chuu (츄)	1	1	0													

Color Key

The contestant slept in the Living Quarters and did not attend the Prison Match
The contestant entered a Secret Chamber and won 10 pieces
The contestant lost all their pieces and was eliminated from the game
The contestant made it to the finale and lost
The contestant made it to the finale and won

== Production ==
The series is produced by Jung Jong-yeon, who has worked in the survival reality show genre before, such as on The Genius. He said that adjustments were made as the show progressed because the contestants' behavior was unpredictable. Season one runner-up ORBIT played with an unusual strategy by collaborating to save players from elimination. Jeong said that it was not the direction he intended the games to progress in but that it created a new narrative for the genre. The first season concluded with Ha Seok-jin winning ₩250,000,000.

In November 2023, Netflix renewed the series for a second season.

The second season concluded with Jeong Hyun-gyu winning ₩380,000,000.

In September 2025, Netflix announced production had begun on the third season. Subsequently, through the 'Next on Netflix 2026 Korea' lineup, the release date for Season 3 was confirmed for the fourth quarter of 2026.

== Season 3: Dead Again ==
The full cast lineup was revealed on Oct 7, 2026 with sixteen players: Jeong Hyun-gyu (winner of season 2), Ha Seok-jin (winner of season 1), Kim Dong-jae (season 1 participant), John Park (Agents of Mystery), Shindong (Super Junior), Jaejae (TV personality), Jang Dong-min (Survival show legend), Hong Jin-ho (Survival show regular), Nucksal (Board gamer), Yi-do (Social studies teacher), Stella Jang (Singer), Hyun Kyeong-ryeol (Software engineer), Jeong Won-young (IT project manager), Xitsuh a.k.a Seo Chul-gu (Rapper), Yurisa (Model), Oh Hyun-min (Mathematics teacher).

The first release date was announced on Oct 13, 2026 with the first episodes airing on Nov 10, 2026.

=== Gameplay ===
Beyond the main match, players who have 0 pieces are not eliminated, unlike previous seasons. The gameplay differs slightly from Season 1 and 2. The prize pot increases based on the number of Prize Tokens retrieved. There are 5 Prize Tokens to be found each worth ₩100 million. After the main match, players are split into two groups based on their ranking from the main match: the top half in rank stay overnight in the living space, while the lower half must spend the night in prison. The Token of Alliance is awarded to the winner of each main match to bring 1 additional player to the living space. Players sent to prison must compete in a nighttime "Prison Match" held in the Death Room within the prison, where at least one player is eliminated. Once a player is eliminated they have the choice to leave the game or enter Exile for a chance to survive. There can only be 4 players in Exile at any time. Matches will be held to eliminate players prior to new players entering. To escape Exile, players must either conquer the Divine Test or win the last game held in Exile on day 6.

==== Day 1 Main Match: Either Or ====
In Either Or, players play through a series of 4 mini-games. Preceding each game, players are given an "either/or" choice, which can change how the mini-game is played or how the outcome is determined.

Choice 1

- Bonus - Receive 1 Piece if you end up in the living area after the game
- Insurance - Receive 2 Pieces if you end up in the prison after the game

Mini Game 1 Count the Cubes - Players are shown a 3d diagram of cubes and must enter the total cubes into their handheld device. Answering quickly decided rankings, which were then used as tiebreakers for the rest of the first day Main Match. Choice 2

- Individual - Players choose to compete in mini game 2 by themselves, gaining 7 points if they win, or 3 points if they lose
- Team - Players choose to play in a team of 3, splitting 7 points if they win or splitting up to 4 lost points if they lose

Mini Game 2 Count the Rectangles - Players are shown a grid of squares with numbers in them. They are then given a number and must find how many “rectangles” (single or multi-square shapes) contain numbers that add up to the target number. Players were allowed to play this game in teams. Points for winning and losing teams were decided by choices 3 separate choices, prior to a final round of spot the rectangles. Choice 3-1 Winning teams of three from the second mini game were given the following choice, made by popular vote within the team

- Monopolize - The teams chosen rep gets 5 points, while the other players get 1 each
- Sacrifice - The team’s chosen rep gets 1 point, while the other 2 get 3 points each

Choice 3-2 Losing teams from the second mini game were given the following choice, made by popular vote within the team

- Sacrifice - The team rep loses 3 points and other members lose none
- Punish - The team rep loses no points and other members lose 2 points

Choice 3-3 Players that chose to play the second mini game by themselves were given this choice

- Challenge - Only the solo players can play the final round of Count the Rectangles, win the first winner gaining 3 Pieces and the remaining players losing 3 Main Match points
- Safety - Solo players do not play in the final challenge and all lose 1 point, meaning one player from each team will play in the final round instead.

Solo players Jang Dong-min and Jeong Hyun-gyu chose challenge, and Jang Dong-min won the 3 pieces.

Choice 4

- The Greater Good - if a majority of players (9 or more) choose this, a Prize Token will be gained, adding 100,000,000₩ to the final prize pool
- Personal Gain - Player’s choosing this option gain 5pts to their Main Match score

The Greater Good vote failed and no money was added to the prize pool.

Mini Game 3 Lay the Grass - Players choose polyomino grass tiles to try and overlay them on a grid, gaining points based on the number on the tile as well as choices made during the game. Choice 5

- Points - Gain 5 points immediately
- Information - Players choosing this will enter the hidden dealer room and be told what choices 6, 7 and 8 will be in advance

Choice 6

- Aggressive - if you place your grass tile, you get double points but if you fail, you lose 4 points
- Defensive - you can cut up to 2 adjacent squares off your tile

Choice 7

- Win-win - choose another player, if your tiles touch gain extra points equal to the sides in contact, split by mutual agreement
- Containment - If 9 players or fewer players place their tiles you gain +5 points (you must place your tile)

Choice 8

- Street Tree - Place a tree token on the board. Players cannot place their tile on top of the green tree tokens, except for the holes found in the tiles
- Manhole - Place a +1 or -1 manhole tile on the board. Players covering up these tiles will gain or lose points accordingly. (Manholes are placed before trees)

Choice 9

- 1 elimination - If the players collectively pay 8 pieces, only one player will be eliminated at the end of the match
- 2 eliminations - If fewer than 8 pieces are paid, the bottom 2 players would be eliminated

Mini Game 4 Memory Poker - Players are shown a 4 x 4 grid of random playing cards and are given 20 seconds to memorize them. After which the cards are flipped over and marked with letters. Players are then shown 3 random cards and must each choose 2 letters corresponding to cards, which will make a 5 card poker hand. This game is played in 1 on 1 matches, starting with the player in the lowest position of Main Match points. Each win moves them up to the next position and moves the losing player down. Once that player loses, the game repeats with the 16th position and then the 15th. After an active player loses, if there are no players in 15th or 16th place who have not already lost a match of memory poker, the game ends and those 2 players are eliminated. Choice 10

- Nomination method - The active player can choose a higher ranked player to face in a 1 on 1 match. If the active player wins, they move up in rank otherwise they drop one rank and the streak ends. If the nominated player wins, they win 1 piece.
- Ladder method - The active player faces the next higher ranked player above them in a streak format until they lose a match.

Players chose the ladder format, with Nucksal and Yi Do in 15th and 16th ranks, respectively. Nuksal succeeds to push Jae Jae into 15th place, and Yi Do lost on her first match against Jae Jae. Jae Jae then came back with a 4 game win streak, pushing Nuksal back into 15th, making Nuksal and Yi Do the first 2 players eliminated.

==== Day 1 Prison Match: Heavy 13 ====
Players are given 7 tokens (2 each of red, green and blue, plus one rainbow token) and 7 cards numbers 0-6. There are 3 scales, which players will place “rocks” on based on their cards played. On each turn players secretly select 1 card and 1 token. All cards and tokens are reveals simultaneously. A rock matching the number of a player’s card is placed on the scale matching the color of their token, in player order. Any player who chose a rainbow chip goes first and chooses which scale their rock will go on. If a player’s rock drives the number total of a scale over 12, that player receives 1 penalty point for each other rock on the scale, which are then removed, leaving only the most recently played rock. Alternatively, a player may choose to pass their turn of rock placement, however once everyone else has gone, all passing players’ rocks are then placed, starting with the player who passed the earliest. After round 7, players receive a new set of cards/tokens and after round 14 the game ends and the 2 players with the most penalty points are eliminated, while the first place player(s) gain 4 pieces (split if multiple players tie, with no remainder). After a last minute turn around, Stella Jang and Hong Jin-Ho are eliminated.

==== 1^{st} Exile Match: Piece Puzzle ====
The first 4 eliminated players in the exile zone played a short elimination game, as only 4 players are allowed in the Exile zone. Players were given 8 Pieces, similar to the game pieces they were given when they arrived to the show, and had to assemble them into a puzzle. Yi Do failed to finish her puzzle, eliminating her completely from The Devil’s Plan, to make room in the Exile Zone for the player eliminated in the second main match.

==== Day 2 Main Match: Mystery Stock Market ====
Players are given a device with 100,000₩ in virtual money, and are presented with 10 fictional company stock tickers. Each company’s stock moves based on a specific rule, which is gradually revealed over the course of the game. Players buy and sell stocks each round as they attempt to guess or uncover the hidden rules and drive up their credit total. Every 5 rounds, more words are revealed in each round, completely revealed by round 20. Players can also mark one company with a “Secret” (once per player), which hides the data for that stock for 2 rounds. Pieces can be spent to either add 10,000 to their money supply or to learn the next second of a specific rule early. Players ending the game over a certain amount, gained extra pieces and the first place player chooses 1 losing player to come to the living area instead of prison. After being cursed by the hidden game in the living area, Jung Won-young lied about the condition for lifting his curse, manipulating Shindong by telling him that if he is in the losing spot, he gains a specific advantage for himself and the next ranked player. After executing a last minute gain, this ensures Shindong takes last place, fulfilling the true condition to lift the curse: Won-young had to choose a player and have them be eliminated in Mystery Stock Market. Shindong is eliminated and Won-young’s curse is lifted.

==== 2^{nd} Exile Match: Spot the Difference ====
In the second Exile Match, players were given picture to study for 2 minutes. They were then given the same picture with 5 changes. Players could draw 5 Xs on the picture to mark where they think the changes are. After 3 rounds, Stella Jang secured her spot in the zone, while Hong Jin-ho took last place. After a tiebreaker round between the remaining 2 players, Nuksal is eliminated along with Jin-ho, as Shindong stays in the exile zone.

==== Day 2 Prison Match: Russian Roulette ====
Players stand in a circle, with a video image of a gun in the middle and each player station at a Chamber, indicated by a letter. 2 of the lettered chambers have hidden bullets in them. Through the game, players have 14 credits, which can be used for various choices; public reveal of 2 chambers, private reveal of 2 chambers, rotate chambers 1 space, rotate chambers 2 spaces or swap the contents of 2 chambers (the latter of which could not be bought in one turn alone). Players spend rounds taking 1 action each until 3 players have run out of credits, at which point the chambers fire, eliminating the 2 players in front of them; Jae Jae and Ha Seok-jin

==== 3^{rd} Exile Match: Secret Code ====
Players are shown a grid of 26 cards numbered 1-26 and lettered A-Z, also containing a shape (suit) and a color. Players are then given a set of 5-6 rules and must construct a 4 card set, with those cards going from lowest to highest number, that falls within all the rules. In each of 3 rounds, the first player to buzz in and call out the correct card set is marked safe. Jae Jae won the first found, followed by Ha Seok-jin and Stella Jang, with Shindong being eliminated.

==== Day 3 Main Match: Gem Black Market ====
Players draw lots to be put in a play order. Each number is assigned a hidden card, with 3 more cards going to a “Buyer” zone and 1 going to a “Trash” zone. Cards include Diamonds, Gold, Silver and Copper, which grant points, and 2 Bomb cards which subtract points. In play order, each player can look at their card and choose to switch with another player, with a buyer card or with the trash card. Taking a bomb card from another player also has a 2 point penalty. After 2 rounds of swapping cards, all cards are revealed. Bomb cards give -4 or -6 points, though the player with the -6 bomb becomes the starting player in the next round. All other cards are compared to the Buyer’s cards. If the symbol on your card matches one or more of the buyer’s cards, you will gain points equal to the number on your card, multiplied by the number of that symbol found on all of the buyer’s cards. As an added twist, each player was assigned a random “buddy”, whose score would be multiplied by their own at the end of the game, to calculate their final score. A tribal rivalry formed between the living area and prison area groups, and by the end, the prison group was able to manipulate the scores to eliminate living area member Oh Hyun-min.

==== 4^{th} Exile Match: Loop Fence Puzzle ====
Players are given a grid of dots, with some of the squares formed by the dots having numbers in them. Their goal was to draw vertical and horizontal lines through the grid, creating one contiguous fence loop, ensuring that each number had a number of lines next to it equal to that number, similar to Minesweeper. Jae Jae quickly completed the puzzle first, with Seok-jin and Hyun-min following, leading to Stella Jang being eliminated.

==== Day 3 Prison Match: Piggy Bank ====
For the prison match, players were each given a piggy bank containing 1 black and 1 white coin. A fifth bank was given to the starting player containing the same. The starting player then chose a number of black and/or white coins to add to their bank and passed it to another player, who had to state how many coins of one color were in the bank they were passed. That player then had to do the same with their initial bank and so on. If a player believed that the number stated was incorrect, they could call a suspicion. If the suspicion was correct, they gained a point and the player who called the number lost one point. If the suspicion was incorrect, the suspecting player lost a point. As XITSUH was the only previous living area player in the game, the prison group had planned to team up on him and have him eliminated. However, several rounds into the game, Jeong Hyun-gyu suffered a panic attack and elected to withdraw from the competition, including not moving to the Exile zone. The game then ended prematurely.

==== Day 4 Main Match: Auction Bingo ====
Players are given a bingo card containing shapes (star, circle, triangle) and are given a set of coins adding up to 30 (one 10, one 5, two 3s, three 2s and three 1s) that could not be broken into smaller denominations. Players start by declaring which shape they are bidding on (min 1). Choices are then revealed and players were directed to make hidden coin bids to win that shape. The winning bid then gained 1 instance of that shape per player who bid on it, with much of the bidding and winning information hidden from the players. Shapes are automatically assigned to their bingo card in the most efficient and optimal way possible. Final scoring rank was decided in order of # of bingos created, number of spaces filled on the card, number of remaining coins. As a bonus, Season 1 participant ORBIT was brought in as a special guest, who could have won 10,000,000₩ each for either winning the match or filling his card completely. Eschewing these goals, ORBIT intentionally manipulates both tribal groups, leading to things becoming increasingly chaotic. In the end Kim Dong-jae is eliminated, while Jung Won-young finally uses his Token of Salvation he won from the hidden living area challenge to escape prison, sending XITSUH in his place.

==== Hidden Stages ====
Players in both the living space and prison have the opportunity to discover a secret chamber in each location. Only one player can enter the chamber at a time. Once the stage is passed no other player may attempt it.

- Living Stage: Secret Vault Retrieve a Prize Token to have 2 total Prize Tokens, fail and get cursed. Wonyoung attempts to retrieve the Prize Token, but activates the curse in the process. He is cursed to have 0 Pieces and he can not gain or use Pieces until his curse is broken. In order to break the curse he must correctly guess which player from the living area will be eliminated in the next main match. He chooses Shindong and successfully eliminates him. As a reward for breaking the curse Wonyoung also receives the Token of Salvation.
  - The Token of Salvation can save a player from elimination by placing them in prison or it can be move a player from prison to the living area. Ranks will adjust accordingly so a different player is demoted to elimination or prison. The Token can be given to any player other than the one eliminated to break the curse.
- Exile Stage: Divine Test

=== Contestants ===
Player	Age	Notes
Kim Dong-jae (김동재)	27	Professional poker player; Currently enrolled in Korea University's College of Health Sciences; Season 1 participant; NO EXIT GAME ROOM Participant
Nucksal (넉살)	39	Rapper; YouTuber; Board Game Enthusiast
Xitsuh/Seo Chul-gu (서출구)	33	Rapper; Admitted early in Brigham Young University; Battle for Tenacy: Penthouse, Game of Blood 2, 3, and X, Death Game 1 and 2 participant; The Logic runner-up
Stella Jang (스텔라장)	34	Singer-songwriter; Fluent in 4 languages; Has Master's Degree in Biotechnology and Business Management from AgroParisTech
Shindong (신동)	40	Super Junior member; Cast of The Great Escape Season 1-4
Oh Hyun-min (오현민)	30	Mathematics Academy Instructor; Graduated early from Gwangju Science High School; Graduated Mathematical Sciences with minor in Economics from KAIST; Code: Secret Room 1 and 2, Accomplice Season 1, and NO EXIT GAME ROOM winner, The Genius: Black Garnet runner-up, The Genius: Grand Final, and Treasure Hunt participant
Yurisa (유리사)	33	Model and singer; Member of Mensa; Death Game Season 2 winner, Game of Blood Seasons 2 and 3, Hexagon Game, and Death Game Season 1 participant
Yi Do (이도)	27	Social Studies and Geography CSAT Lecturer; Graduated from Seoul National University's College of Education; Cast of Better Late Than Single 1
Jang Dong-min (장동민)	46	Comedian; "The Emperor/God of Brain Survival Shows"; The Genius: Black Garnet, The Genius: Grand Final, Society Game 2, and Game of Blood 3 winner
Jaejae (재재)	35	MC; Former editor for SBS News; Graduated History and Advertising and Public Relations from Ewha Womans University; Cast member of Girls' High Mystery Class
Jung Won-young (정원영)		IT Project Manager for LG; South Korea's representative for Red Bull Escape Room World Championship in 2017; Member of Mensa; Life's Game participant
Jeong Hyun-gyu (정현규)	28	Influencer; Member of Mensa; Currently enrolled in Seoul National University's Department of Physical Education; Cast of Transit Love 2; Season 2 Winner
John Park (존박)	37	Singer; On Leave of Absence from Northwestern University; The Time Hotel Winner
Ha Seok-jin (하석진)	44	Actor; Graduated Mechanical Engineering from Hanyang University; Cast of Problematic Men; Season 1 Winner
Hyun Kyung-ryul (현경렬)	40	Software Engineer for Google and AlphaKyung; Graduated Computer Engineering from Seoul National University; Society Game 1 winner
Hong Jin-ho (홍진호)	43	Professional poker player; Former Pro gamer; The Genius: Rules of the Game, War of Poker Gods 1 and 2 winner, The Time Hotel runner-up, The Genius: Rule Breaker, The Genius: Grand Final, War of the Poker Gods 3, Game of Blood 2, 3, and X, Death Game 1 and 2 participant
ORBIT (재혁) *Guest player Main Match 4	43	Astronomer, Science Communicator, Blue House's former policy advisor; Runner up of Season 1

=== Episodes ===
No.	Title	Original release date
1	"Episode 1"	November 10, 2026
2	"Episode 2"	November 10, 2026
3	"Episode 3"	November 10, 2026
4	"Episode 4"	November 10, 2026
5	"Episode 5"	November 10, 2026
6	"Episode 6"	November 17, 2026
7	"Episode 7"	November 17, 2026
8	"Episode 8"	November 17, 2026
9	"Episode 9"	November 17, 2026
10	"Episode 10"	November 17, 2026
11	"Episode 11"	November 24, 2026
12	"Episode 12"	November 24, 2026
13	"Episode 13"	November 24, 2026
14	"Episode 14"	November 24, 2026

=== Eliminations and numbers of pieces ===
Contestant	Start	Main Match 1	Prison Match 1	Main Match 2	Prison Match 2	Main Match 3	Prison Match 3	Main Match 4	Prison Match 4	Main Match 5	Prison Match 5	Main Match 6	Prison Match 6	Final
Xitsuh (서출구)	1	3	3	4	N/A	2	N/A							
Jang Dong-min (장동민)	1	5	N/A	7	N/A	5	N/A		N/A					
Jung Won-young (정원영)	1	1	N/A	1	2	3	2		N/A					
John Park (존박)	1	1	1	1	2	2	2							
Hyun Kyung-ryul (현경렬)	1	2	N/A	3	4	3	3		N/A					
Yurisa (유리사)	1	2	N/A	2	N/A	2	N/A		0					
Kim Dong-jae (김동재)	1	1	N/A	2	N/A	3	N/A	0						
Jeong Hyun-gyu (정현규)	1	3	3	3	4	4	0 (Note: Jeong Hyun-gyu voluntarily withdrew from Season 3 following a panic attack sustained within the third prison game.)							
Oh Hyun-min (오현민)	1	2	N/A	3	N/A	0								
Ha Seok-jin (하석진)	1	1	5	6	0									
Jaejae (재재)	1	1	1	1	0									
Shindong (신동)	1	1	N/A	0										
Stella Jang (스텔라장)	1	3	0											
Hong Jin-ho (홍진호)	1	1	0											
Nucksal (넉살)	1	0												
Yi Do (이도)	1	0												

Color Key

The contestant did not attend the match
The contestant entered a Hidden Level
The contestant lost all their pieces and was eliminated from the game
The contestant made it to the finale and lost
The contestant made it to the finale and won

=== Exile Progress ===
Contestant (Note: Jeong Hyun-gyu voluntarily withdrew from Season 3 following a panic attack sustained within the third prison game.)	Exile 1	Exile 2	Exile 3	Exile 4	Hidden Level	Exile 5	Hidden Level	TBD
Yurisa (유리사)							N/A	
Kim Dong-jae (김동재)						SAFE	N/A	
Jaejae (재재)			SAFE	SAFE	N/A	SAFE	TBD	
Oh Hyun-min (오현민)				SAFE	N/A	X		
Ha Seok-jin (하석진)			SAFE	SAFE	X			
Stella Jang (스텔라장)	SAFE	SAFE	SAFE	X				
Shindong (신동)		SAFE	X					
Hong Jin-ho (홍진호)	SAFE	X						
Nucksal (넉살)	SAFE	X						
Yi Do (이도)	X							

Color Key

The contestant was still competing in the house and had not yet entered exile.
The contestant did not attend the match
The contestant entered a Hidden Level
The contestant permanently eliminated from the game

=== Main Match Rankings ===
Player	Main Match 1	Main Match 2	Main Match 3	Main Match 4	Main Match 5	Main Match 6	Final
Xitsuh/Seo Chul-gu (서출구)	12	2	5	3			
Jang Dong-min (장동민)	1	1	1	1			
Jung Won-young (정원영)	5	11	3	3			
John Park (존박)	14	8	8	3			
Hyun Kyung-ryul (현경렬)	4	5	7	2			
Yurisa (유리사)	6	10	4	7			
Kim Dong-jae (김동재)	3	4	2	8			
Jeong Hyun-gyu (정현규)	8	9	6				
Oh Hyun-min (오현민)	10	3	9				
Ha Seok-jin (하석진)	9	6					
Jaejae (재재)	11	7					
Shindong (신동)	2	12					
Stella Jang (스텔라장)	13	14					
Hong Jin-ho (홍진호)	7	14					
Nucksal (넉살)	15						
Yi Do (이도)	16						
ORBIT (재혁) *Guest player				6			

== Accolades ==
Name of the award ceremony, year presented, category, nominee of the award, and the result of the nomination
Award ceremony	Year	Category	Nominee / Work	Result	Ref.
Blue Dragon Series Awards	2024	Best Entertainment Program	The Devil's Plan	Nominated	
Blue Dragon Series Awards	2024	Best New Male Entertainer	Kwak Joon-bin	Won	
