= Jonathan Yiombi =

Democratic Republic of Congo entertainer in South Korea

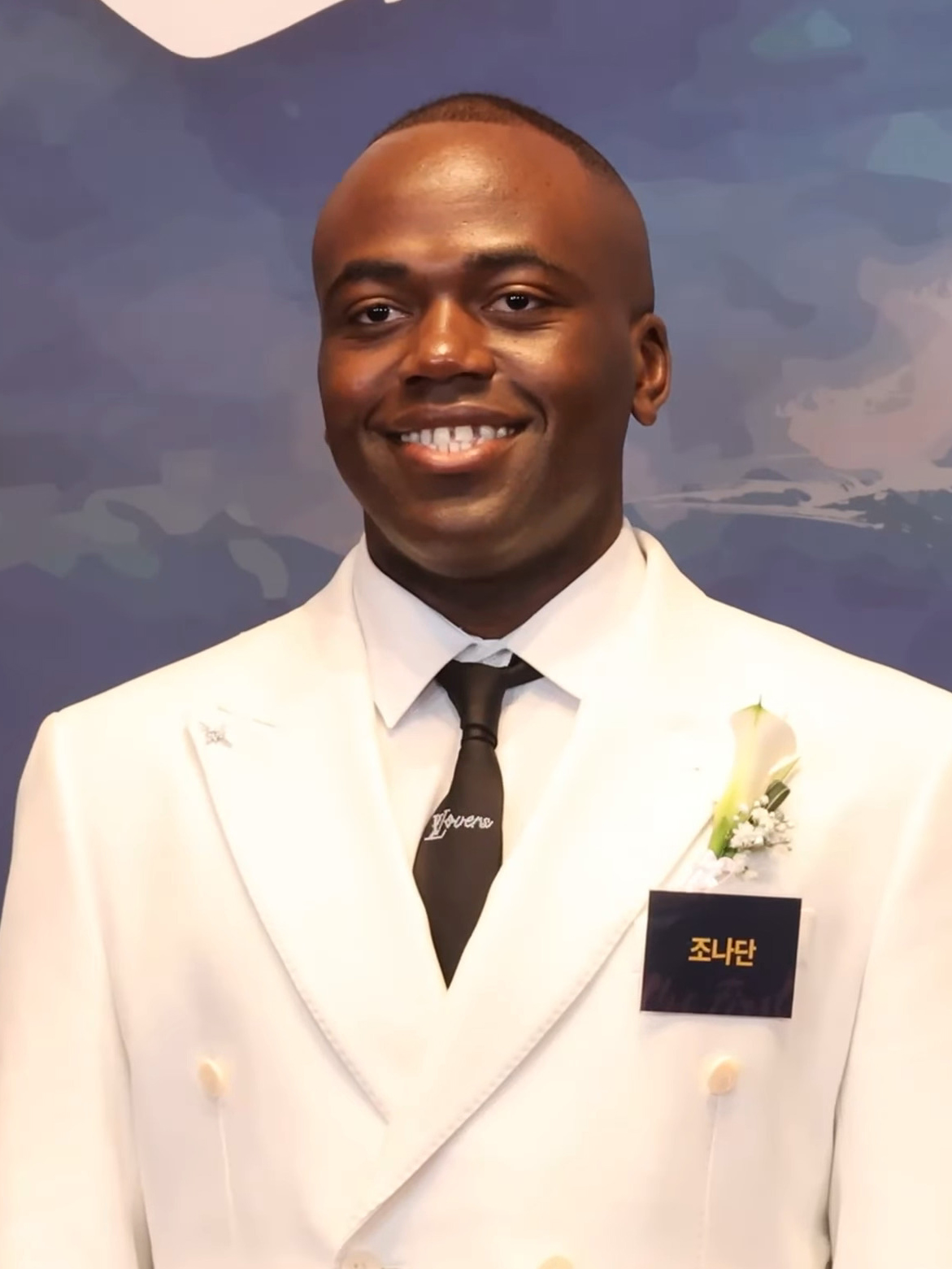
- Jonathan in 2026
- Born: Jonathan Thona Yiombi; February 1, 2000 (age 26); Democratic Republic of the Congo
- Occupation: Entertainer
- Years active: 2019 – present
- Agent: Black Paper
- Father: Yiombi Thona
- Relatives: Patricia (sister), Ravi Yombi (brother)

Jonathan Thona Yiombi (Korean: 조나단 토나 욤비; born February 1, 2000) is a Congolese entertainer based in South Korea.

== Personal life ==
He is the second son of Yiombi Thona, a former politician and diplomat in the Democratic Republic of Congo. On February 13, 2008, Jonathan fled to South Korea with his mother and siblings after his father was recognized as a refugee through a trial. He lived in Incheon for 5 years then moved to Gwangju when he was in the 6th grade of elementary school. On January 26, 2024, he shared his intention to naturalize as a Korean citizen and later revealed in an interview published in 2026 with Jung Jae-hyung that he is awaiting the results of his citizenship application after completing the naturalization exam. As of May 2026, he still maintains his citizenship in the Democratic Republic of the Congo. In August 2019, he mentioned on Radio Star that 'Yiombi' was his last name and that his full name was 'Jonathan Yiombi'.

== Education ==
- Munseong Middle School (Graduated)
- Gwangju Dongseong High School (Graduated)
- Hankuk University of Foreign Studies, College of Social Sciences (Political Diplomacy)

== Other ventures ==
=== Ambassadorship ===
Year	History
2019	Korea Tourism Organization Public Relations Ambassador

=== Endorsement ===
Year	Brand	Item	Notes	Ref.
2018	Norangtongdak			
2022	KT	Y덤		
2022	McDonald's	McCrispy	with Patricia	
2022	HotelsCombined			
2022	Pagoda Education Group	Pagoda Language Academy	with Patricia	

== Filmography ==
=== Television shows ===
Year	Title	Network	Role	Ref.
2019	Hunmaenjeongeum (훈맨정음)	MBN	Cast member	
2019	Comedy Classics	KBS2	Cast member	
2020	K-Pop Language School	tvN	Cast member	
2022	Godfather (TV program)	KBS2	Cast member	
2022	Generation Z Self Survival (Z멋대로 생존기, Zㅏ때는 말이야)	Mnet	Cast member	
2022	Choice of Seven Billions (70억의 선택)	tvN	Cast member	
2022	Korean History (벌거벗은 한국사)	tvN STORY	Cast member	
2022	King of Mask Singer	MBC	Contestant on Ep. 341 (as Playing Ddakji)	
2023	Han Moon-chul's Dashcam Review	JTBC	Panelist	
2024	My Sibling's Romance	JTBC	Panelist	
2025	Knowing International High School (아는 외고)	JTBC	Cast member	

=== Web shows ===
Year	Title	Network	Role	Ref.
2021 – 2022	Florida Project (플로리다 프로젝트)	Flo x SM	Host	
2022 – present	Neighborhood Star K (동네스타K)	tvN D	Host	
2023	Zombieverse	Netflix	Cast member	

=== Documentary ===
Year	Title	Network	Role	Notes	Ref.
2013	Screening Humanity	KBS2	himself	Prince of Congo edition	

=== Drama ===
Year	Title	Network	Role	Notes	Ref.
2021	Racket Boys	SBS	Jonathan (exchange student)	Special appearance	

== Awards and nominations ==
Award	Year	Category	Nominee / Work	Result	Ref.
KBS Entertainment Awards	2022	Best Couple Awards	Godfather (TV program)	Won (Note: Shared with Kim Sook.)	
Blue Dragon Series Awards	2024	Best New Male Entertainer	Zombieverse	Nominated	
