= My Sibling's Romance =

South Korean dating reality series

- Promotional Poster
- Also known as: Love Siblings
- Hangul: 연애남매
- RR: Yeonaenammae
- MR: Yŏnaenammae
- Genre: Dating show
- Created by: Lee Jin-ju; Choi Mi-rae; Kim Seul-gi; Shin Hye-won; Kang Yu-mi Choi Yu-jin; Kim Keum-nan; Lee Rin-ha; Jung Yun-ha; Jung Jin-won; Bae Soo-yun; Jung Hyeon-hee; Kang Young-hyun; Lee Ye-dam; Seo Ji-won; Jin Ha-jeong; Kim Si-won; Choi Soo-bin; Kong Mun-jeong
- Written by: Yeom Mi-ran; Woo Ji-hoon; Jeong Ji-yeon; Yoon Ji-hee; Kim Jin-ah; Do Yu-jin; Kim Min-ji; Lee Sae-byeok; Lee Sang-yeon; Yang Seung-hyeon
- Presented by: Han Hye-jin; Code Kunst; BamBam; Miyeon; Jonathan Yiombi; Patricia Yiombi
- Country of origin: South Korea
- Original language: Korean
- No. of episodes: 16 episodes

Production
- Producer: JTBC
- Production company: SAY
- Budget: Wavve

Original release
- Network: JTBC; Wavve
- Release: March 1 – June 14, 2024

My Sibling's Romance (Korean: 연애남매; RR: Yeonaenammae; lit. 'Love Siblings') is an original South Korean dating reality show that aired every Friday on JTBC and Wavve, an OTT service in Korea. It premiered on March 1, 2024.

== Format ==
My Sibling's Romance is a story about several siblings hiding each other's identities and gathering in one house while looking for their respective lovers. The format of the program is the same as other romance-entertainment programs, where young men and women come together in one space. By filling the cast with siblings, it also deals with the friendship and family love between siblings. It also has the format of a mystery drama as the participants need to guess the identity of the other's blood relatives. The siblings who appear in My Sibling's Romance pretend not to know who their siblings are. This is the first dating reality show to feature siblings. The siblings variable was also highly involved in the romance process because the sibling could either help or hinder each other's romances. One of the panelists, BamBam, said that My Sibling's Romance has a sitcom-like feel because of the sibling chemistry.

== Production ==
=== Concept and development ===
My Sibling's Romance was created by producer Lee Jin-ju (PD Lee) under JTBC. Lee had previously worked as an assistant director for various works with producer Na Yeong-seok at TvN, and created the TVING original series Transit Love after becoming independent. After moving from TVN to JTBC, she produced My Sibling's Romance, which is similar to her previous project, Transit Love. The investigation aspect of guessing whose sibling is whose is similar to Transit Love, but the contestants are family instead of ex-lovers.

In an interview, PD Lee shared that the team that worked on Transit Love gathered together and came up with several plans for their new show, but as they talked, they ended up coming back to the dating entertainment program style they excelled in. Lim Jeong-ah, the head of JTBC's entertainment production division, also agreed that My Sibling's Romance family concept could appeal to a wider audience. At the production presentation in January, PD Lee shared that she had the idea of making a dating program with siblings because her friend worried about their brother, who had appeared on a dating program. She thought the worrying feelings for family could become the fun interesting part of the show.

=== Filming ===
The first half of My Sibling's Romance was filmed in South Korea; from episode 10, they filmed in Singapore. During an interview, PD Lee mentioned that staff placed more than 100 cameras around the house in order to film the show. The production staff members also hid behind a one-way mirror to shoot the participants. The staff rarely faced the participants except during interviews or when setting the microphone.

=== Casting ===
PD Lee said that the casting of My Sibling's Romance required real relatives, but public auditions weren't able to be held because the new production idea was supposed to be secret. The staff contacted around 1500 people through Instagram direct messaging; after deciding that the person was attractive, they revealed the show's concept, but many of those contacted did not have an opposite-sex sibling. Difficulties also came with casting the parents, as they had to appear in the show as well. Because of that, the siblings were not recruited with representativeness of 'normal family fantasy' (Note: the 'normal family fantasy' is a norm that a family of four consists of a father, mother and two children) in mind, but more by finding attractive people to recruit.

== Reception ==
=== Critical reception ===
Pop culture critic Jeong Deok-hyeon said, "Dating and siblings may feel disparate, but in fact, the drama genre has dealt with a lot of family love," and added, "It appears that a lot of effort was put into recruiting performers with relationships that viewers can empathize with." He continued, "However, I expect that things will not go smoothly in the future," adding, "The strong family love shown in the beginning may lead to deep emotional conflict in the second half."

=== Public reception ===
After the first episode aired, according to Wavve viewing data on March 4, 2024, My Sibing's Romance ranked first on the weekend new paid subscription attraction index to Wavve's entertainment genre in the first week of March, and it continued maintain its rank at the top for four consecutive weeks.

My Sibling's Romance also ranked fourth in the TV-OTT integrated non-drama category popularity ranking for the first week of March announced by Good Data Corporation on March 12, 2024. It then peaked at number one on March 18 and maintained its top rank for three consecutive weeks, as announced on Fundex, the official platform of Good Data Corporation. In addition, My Sibling's Romance also ranked first in the overall TV-OTT non-drama category on March 18, and maintained its top rank for two consecutive weeks.

== Cast ==
=== Panelists ===
List of the panelists:

- Han Hye-jin
- Code Kunst
- BamBam
- Miyeon
- Jonathan Yiombi
- Patricia Yiombi

=== Participants ===
List of participants, showing birth year, MBTI, Occupations, and Notes
Name	Birth Year (Note: Revealed on Episode 7)	MBTI	Occupation	Siblings	Notes	Introduction
Jae-hyung	1994	ENTJ	Accountant financial advisory headquarters (Graduated Business Administration from Sogang University)	Park Se-seung's older brother (Note: Revelead on Episode 1)		Intro letter When we were young, Jae-hyung and I always held hands. Even at a young age, I remember him comforting me when I was fighting with my friends and crying in bed because I was upset. He was such an adult and good kid. Then Jae-hyung went through puberty and he didn't pretend to know me even when I ran into him outside. He liked singing while screaming, so he ended up forming a band. When Jae-hyung sang "Bus Stop" (정류장) at the concert, saying it was a song he dedicated to our mother, I was so moved that I secretly shed tears. I was so heartbroken when Jae-hyung, who had been looking for romance on stage, began to compromise with reality and start studying. He is a person who, when he decides to do something, does his best to do it, so I could see how difficult it must have been while enduring that period. Even now, Jae-hyung still teases me by sending me unshaven selfies and acting cute, but he is a warm and wise person who knows how to take care of his people more than anyone else. What do you think about the kind of work that Jae-hyung do?
Se-seung	1996	ENFJ	Preparing for a job change and a Foreign management strategy consultant (Graduated Business Administration from Chung-Ang University and Master's in Statistical Data Science from Yonsei University)	Park Jae-hyung's younger sister		Intro letter Is there anyone who likes steamed bun? Se-seung had dimples as white and sharp as steamed buns fresh from a steamer. Unlike me, who just hated being bothered, Se-seung was a class president and a good student who studied hard. Even when she was a college student, she lived a fresh life, participating in various club activities and getting an overall A+ grade. In graduate school, I was very inspired by seeing her studying all night long, as if she felt inferior to the researchers around her. I look forward to the future of Se-seung, who creates her own life.
Yong-woo	1990	ENTJ, ENFJ	Aspiring Pilot (Graduated Physical Education from Korea University)	Lee Ju-yeon's older brother	Has a pilot certificate to study in U.S. for 1 year after graduating. 2nd place on Mister International Korea 2022 and 4th place on Mister Supranational 2023	Intro letter As a child, Yong-woo was a child who loved books. Even when he was having a hard time as a child, he consoled himself by reading books. I think from then on, he learned not to get too excited and to maintain a positive mindset. He is a kind and humorous person no matter the situation, so he has the charm of making people around him happy when he is with him. Yong-woo grew up to be a persistent adult who, if there is something he wants to do, makes a detailed plan and carries it out without wasting time. After being discharged from the military, he said he had found what he wanted to do and went to the United States to pursue a dream that had nothing to do with his college major, where he began difficult studies and eventually achieved that dream. I think Yong-woo's persistence and the dreams he dreams really match. What do you think about the kind of work that Yong-woo do?
Ju-yeon	1999	ESFJ	Enbrox product team	Lee Yong-woo's younger sister		Intro letter Ju-yeon was a child who listened well to people's stories and had good reactions from a young age. So, ever since she was young, she was always loved among friends. Although she had a lot of worries about her career path and had a hard time, Ju-yeon is now adapting to social life better than anyone else, and I believe that like her mother, who has always been a great career woman, she will also confidently accomplish anything she does. What do you think about the kind of work that Ju-yeon do?
Cheol-hyun	1991	ENTJ	Advertisement model	Park Cho-a's younger brother	Active as a model since 2017. Appears in iHub, Samsung washing machine commercials, Jannabi music videos and more	Intro letter Cheol-hyun, who had a unique appearance from a young age, had a good fashion sense and was very interested in decorating himself. It is said that Cheol-hyun, who has a lot of cuteness, walked around holding his mother's hand and everyone looked at him, thinking he was cute. Cheol-hyun experienced a variety of things in an unfamiliar environment and had a lot of hardships, but I think he was able to grow faster through that opportunity. I feel fortunate that Cheol-hyun, who looks cold but has a warmer and more tender heart than anyone else, has a job that allows him to express himself. I sincerely hope that he can overcome his hidden wounds and live as a free person. What do you think about the kind of work that Cheol-hyeon do?
Cho-a	1989	INFJ	Jubis diet consultant Former yoga instructor (Graduated Food and Nutrition from University of Ulsan)	Park Cheol-hyeon's older sister		Intro letter Cho-a is a person who is both sensitive and easy-going. She is very curious, so when she catches something while walking, she stands there staring and thinking deeply. From an early age, Cho-a had a strong sense of responsibility. When we were young and our house was being robbed, I remember that little girl wrapping her arms around me to protect me. Not long ago, I climbed a mountain with Cho-a. I remember the moment we reached the top, relying on each other, pushing our backs and holding our hands. We promised to always be on each other's side whenever we take on a new challenge. What do you think about the kind of work that Cho-a do?
Jung-sub	1996	ENTJ	Artificial intelligence researcher (Graduated Computer Science from Korea University and currently attending PhD in Bioinformatics in Seoul National University)	Lee Yun-ha's younger brother	Graduated one year early from Sejong Science High School.	Intro letter Jungsub inherited a scientific mind from his father and an artistic sense from his mother. Jungsub, who was like a healthy and strong teddy bear, joined a dance club when he was a high school student and had to study hard, and became famous as Little U-Know Yunho, making his father catch him by his neck. If a person became close to my sibling, wouldn't he show his hidden talents?
Yun-ha	1989	ESTP	Cellist (Graduated Music Conservatory from Korea National University of Arts and Master's in Musical Arts from Yale University)	Lee Jung-sub's older sister		Intro letter Ever since she was young, Yun-ha was a sweetheart who always melted the hearts of her family with her pretty smile. She is a strong-willed person who endured the lonely life of studying abroad in front of her career and even won a scholarship with excellent grades. Although she does things that only she can do if she is more sensitive than anyone else, in real life she is surprisingly simple and cool, and has a variety of charms. Yun-ha is a person with a great desire to grow. Since she was young, there were times when she looked like a fool for being honest and simple and running with only one dream in mind, but I think that's what made Yun-ha who she is today. I hope that this friend's path will continue to be accompanied by brilliant melodies. Clap clap clap. What do you think about the kind of work that Yun-ha do?
Yun-jae	1994	ENTJ	Restaurant owner (Graduated Business Administration from University of Toronto)	Kim Ji-won's older brother		
Ji-won	1995	ENFJ	WAVY A&R team leader (Graduated Business Administration from University of Toronto)	Kim Yun-jae's younger sister		

Daily Text Messages, Official Dates and Confession Result

Male participants
Female participants
No text messages were sent for the day
Choose each other

Text Message History
Participants	Days																	
Participants	1	2	3	4	5	6	7	8	9	10	11	12	13	14	15	16	17	18
Park Se-seung		Jung-sub	Jung-sub	Jung-sub	Jung-sub	Jung-sub		Yong-woo	Jung-sub	(Note: Decided to not send a text to anyone)		Jung-sub			Jung-sub	Cheol-hyun	Jung-sub	Jung-sub
Park Jae-hyung		Ju-yeon	Yun-ha	Yun-ha	Ji-won	Ju-yeon		Ju-yeon	Ju-yeon	-		Ji-won			Ji-won	Ji-won	Ji-won	Ji-won
Lee Ju-yeon		Cheol-hyun	Cheol-hyun	Jae-hyung	Cheol-hyun	Jae-hyung		Jae-hyung	Jae-hyung	Jae-hyung		Jae-hyung			Jae-hyung	Yun-jae	Jae-hyung	Jae-hyung
Lee Yong-woo		Cho-a	Cho-a	Cho-a	Cho-a	Cho-a		Cho-a	Cho-a	Cho-a		Cho-a			Cho-a	Yun-ha	Cho-a	Ji-won
Lee Yun-ha		Yong-woo	Jae-hyung	Jae-hyung	Jae-hyung	Cheol-hyun		Jae-hyung	Yun-jae	Yun-jae		Yun-jae			Yun-jae	Yong-woo	Yun-jae	Yun-jae
Lee Jung-sub		Se-seung	Se-seung	Se-seung	Se-seung	Se-seung		Cho-a	Se-seung	Ji-won		Se-seung			Se-seung	Se-seung	Se-seung	Se-seung
Park Cho-a		Jung-sub	Yong-woo	Yong-woo	Yong-woo	Yong-woo		Yong-woo	Yong-woo	Yong-woo		Yong-woo			Yong-woo	Yong-woo	Yong-woo	Yong-woo
Park Cheol-hyun		Ju-yeon	Ju-yeon	Ju-yeon	Se-seung	Yun-ha		Ji-won	Ji-won	Ji-won		Yun-ha			Ji-won	Ji-won	Ji-won	Ji-won
Kim Ji-won	Not yet in the show				Yong-woo	Yong-woo		Cheol-hyun	Cheol-hyun	-		Jae-hyung			Jae-hyung	Jae-hyung	Jae-hyung	Yong-woo
Kim Yun-jae	Not yet in the show								Yun-ha	Yun-ha		Yun-ha			Yun-ha	Yun-ha	Yun-ha	Yun-ha

Confession Result
Participants
Lee Jung-sub	↔	Park Se-seung
Kim Yun-jae	↔	Lee Yun-ha
Lee Yong-woo	↔	Kim Ji-won
Park Cheol-hyun	→	Park Se-seung
Park Cho-a	→	Lee Yong-woo
Park Jae-hyung	→	Kim Ji-won
Lee Ju-yeon	→	Park Jae-hyung

== Episodes ==
=== Episode list ===
No.	Title	Running time	Original release date	Ref.
1	"We were Siblings When We were Born"; Transliteration: "taeona boni nammaeyottta" (Korean: 태어나 보니 남매였다)	2:15:03	March 1, 2024	
Eight men and women (Jae-hyung, Se-seung, Yong-woo, Ju-yeon, Cheol-hyun, Cho-a, Jung-sub, Yun-ha) gather in one house, hiding their blood relative's identity and meeting the other couple of siblings. They had a fierce battle of wits to hide their identities, following the instructions in the move-in guide that only revealed their first names, not their last names. In particular, right after moving in, the staff send a text message that said, "Please send me the name of the person you think your siblings will be attracted to at first sight." A unique first date method was later revealed in which the female participants wrote a note without a recipient or sender and gave it to another woman that they presumed to be a blood relative of the person they wanted to date, so the woman who received the note will act as a cupid to deliver the note to her brother. The panelists bet to guess the siblings then Park Jae-hyung and Park Se-seung revealed as the first sibling to the viewers.
2	"It's okay. It's family" Transliteration: "gwaenchana gajogiya" (Korean: 괜찮아 가족이야)	2:17:49	March 8, 2024	
All siblings got revealed ( Yong-woo & Ju-yeon, Cheol-hyun & Cho-a, Jung-sub & Yun-ha). The siblings spent their first day together after moving in and grew closer as they shopped and played sports together during the day. At night, each cast member sent a text message expressing their sincerity. The message was sent to the receiver, then the sibling of the receiver also a message from the staff about how many messages their sibling received. Afterwards, a secret room called "The Underground Hideout" was revealed.
3	"That's how I became an adult" Transliteration: "geuroke oreuni dweotsseumnida" (Korean: 그렇게 어른이 되었습니다)	2:28:44	March 15, 2024	
On this day, the participants went on their first date using the Cupid note they received on the first day they moved in without knowing who their date partner was. The panelists watched the date progress and made several comments. In addition, the occupations of the participants, which had been hidden, were revealed, as well as sibling introductions written by their blood relatives. In the broadcast released exclusively on Wavve, the participants were shown exchanging heartfelt text messages on the third day after moving in. Since the text messages were exchanged right after the date, the contestants expressed their feelings for the person they spent time with all day.
4	"10 Minutes"	1:53:02	March 22, 2024	
On a rainy night, the male residents gathered outside the house and had a cozy time eating out together. After that, messages requesting a secret conversation arrived one by one to the room. A new female participant named Ji-won appeared in a separate room. During the conversation with Jung-sub, she revealed her job as an A&R in entertainment industries. After being able to have a one-on-one conversation with each male participant, she chose Yong-woo as his date.
5	"At the First Sight"; Transliteration: "cheot nun-e" (Korean: 첫 눈에)	2:19:12	March 29, 2024	TBA
6	"Chadol (Note: a term for bold person in Korea) is a variable" Transliteration: "chadori byeonsune" (Korean: 차돌이 변수네)	2:24:26	April 5, 2024	TBA
7	"Me who is not Alone"; Transliteration: "honja-ga anin na" (Korean: 혼자가 아닌 나)	2:10:57	April 12, 2024	TBA
8	"Sibling's Dilemma"; Transliteration: "namae-eui dillema" (Korean: 남매의 딜레마)	2:04:00	April 19, 2024	TBA
9	"Dynamic Duo"; Transliteration: "dainamik dyu-o" (Korean: 다이나믹 듀오)	2:17:22	April 26, 2024	TBA
10	"Confirmation"; Transliteration: "hwag-in" (Korean: 확인)	1:52:47	May 3, 2024	TBA
11	"Sibling's Room"; Transliteration: "nammae-eui bang" (Korean: 남매의 방)	TBA	May 10, 2024	TBA
12	"Lighting Flash"; Transliteration: "jeongwangseokhwa" (Korean: 전광석화)	TBA	May 17, 2024	TBA
13	"Awakening"; Transliteration: "gakseong" (Korean: 각성)	TBA	May 24, 2024	TBA
14	"Neutral"; Transliteration: "junglip" (Korean: 중립)	TBA	May 31, 2024	TBA
15	"Secret"; Transliteration: "bimil" (Korean: 비밀)	TBA	June 7, 2024	TBA
16	"Choice"; Transliteration: "seontaek" (Korean: 선택)	TBA	June 14, 2024	TBA

== Broadcast and release ==
My Sibling's Romance aird every Friday at 8:50 PM KST on JTBC and is exclusively pre-released 50 minutes earlier on Wavve. The first episode premiered on March 1, 2024. My Sibling's Romance released the full-version episode on Wavve first and then an edited version of some scenes aired on JTBC, due to run-time limits. The television version has points that whether young or adult viewers would find interesting like the participant's home videos and photos of their childhood.

== Ratings ==
In the table below, the blue numbers represent the lowest ratings and the red numbers represent the highest ratings.

Episode #	Original broadcast date	Average audience share	
Episode #	Original broadcast date	AGB Nielsen	
Episode #	Original broadcast date	Nationwide	Seoul National Capital Area
1	March 1, 2024	0.812%	—
2	March 8, 2024	0.747%	—
3	March 15, 2024	0.922%	—
4	March 22, 2024	1.038%	—
5	March 29, 2024	1.012%	—
6	April 5, 2024	1.166%	—
7	April 12, 2024	1.101%	—
8	April 19, 2024	0.851%	—
9	April 26, 2024	1.205%	—
10	May 3, 2024	1.143%	—
11	May 10, 2024	1.291%	—
12	May 17, 2024	0.990%	—
13	May 24, 2024	1.038%	—
14	May 31, 2024	1.182%	—
15	June 7, 2024	1.009%	—
16	June 14, 2024	1.649%	—
Average		1.072%	—
"—" means unable to check the viewership ratings

== Original Soundtracks ==
List of OST, showing date released and artist
Title	Release Date	Artist	Notes	Ref
"Romantic Revolution" (우리 둘만의 혁명)	8 March 2024	Lee Bada	Part 1	
"You and I"	22 March 2024	Miyeon	Part 2	
"Invisible Goodbye" (나만 보이는 이별은)	8 June 2024	Hen	Part 3	
"To us" (위로)	15 June 2024	Park So-eun	Part 4	

== Accolades ==
List of Awards and nominations, showing name of the award ceremony, year presented, category, nominee of the award, and the result of the nomination
Award ceremony	Year	Category	Nominee	Result	Ref.
Blue Dragon Series Awards	2024	Best Entertainment Program	My Sibling's Romance	Nominated	
Blue Dragon Series Awards	2024	Best Male Entertainer	Code Kunst	Nominated	
Blue Dragon Series Awards	2024	Best New Female Entertainer	Miyeon	Nominated	
Blue Dragon Series Awards	2024	Best New Female Entertainer	Patricia Yiombi	Nominated	
