= Kwaktube =

South Korean entertainer (born 1992)

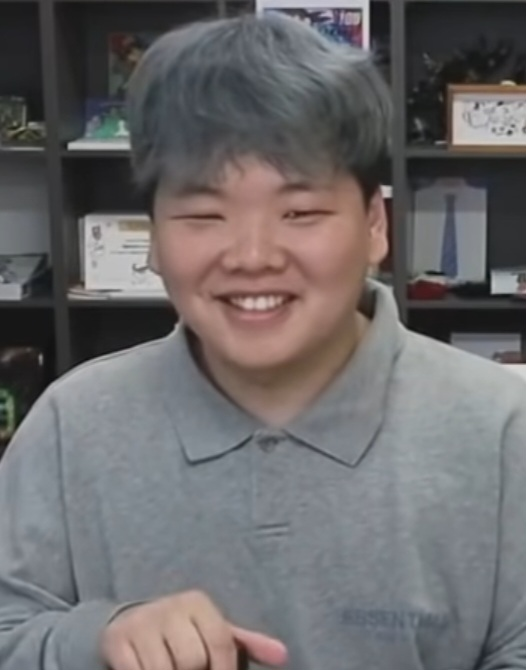
- Born: Kwak Joon-bin; 2 February 1992 (age 34); Busan, South Korea
- Spouse: Unknown (m. 2025)
- Children: 1

YouTube information
- Channel: JBKWAK
- Years active: 2018–present
- Genre: Travel vlog
- Subscribers: 2.13 million (2025)
- Views: 622 million (2025)

Korean name
- Hangul: 곽준빈
- RR: Gwak Junbin
- MR: Kwak Chunbin

Kwak Joon-bin (Korean: 곽준빈; born February 2, 1992), known professionally as Kwaktube (곽튜브) is a South Korean YouTuber and television personality.

== Early life ==
Kwak was born on February 2, 1992 in Busan. His father was a truck driver and his mother worked at a market. Kwak was a victim of school bullying. He majored in Russian-language at Busan University of Foreign Studies. Kwak studied at Irkutsk National Research Technical University for one year starting in 2015. Kwak went to Limerick, Ireland to study language for 7 months starting in 2017. Kwak worked at the Embassy of the Republic of Korea to Azerbaijan from 2018 to 2019.

== Career ==
Kwak started YouTube in 2018 with videos of his life in Azerbaijan.

== Personal life ==
On October 11, 2025, Kwak married a non-celebrity five years younger than him. Kwak announced the birth of his first child, a son, on March 24, 2026.

== Filmography ==
=== Television shows ===
Year	Title	Role	Ref.
2023–present	Earth Marble World Tour	Cast member	
2023	Busan Boys: Sydney Bound	Cast member	
2023–present	Kwak Taxitrip	Cast member	
2023	The Devil's Plan	Participant	
2024	Moo No Plan	Cast member	
2024	Crazy Super Korean	Cast member	
2024	Pop-up Landing Operation	Cast member	

== Accolades ==
Name of the award ceremony, year presented, category, nominee of the award, and the result of the nomination
Award ceremony	Year	Category	Nominee / Work	Result	Ref.
Blue Dragon Series Awards	2024	Best New Male Entertainer	Kwak Joon-bin (The Devil's Plan)	Won	
