= Lee Si-won =

South Korean actress (born 1987)

Lee See-won
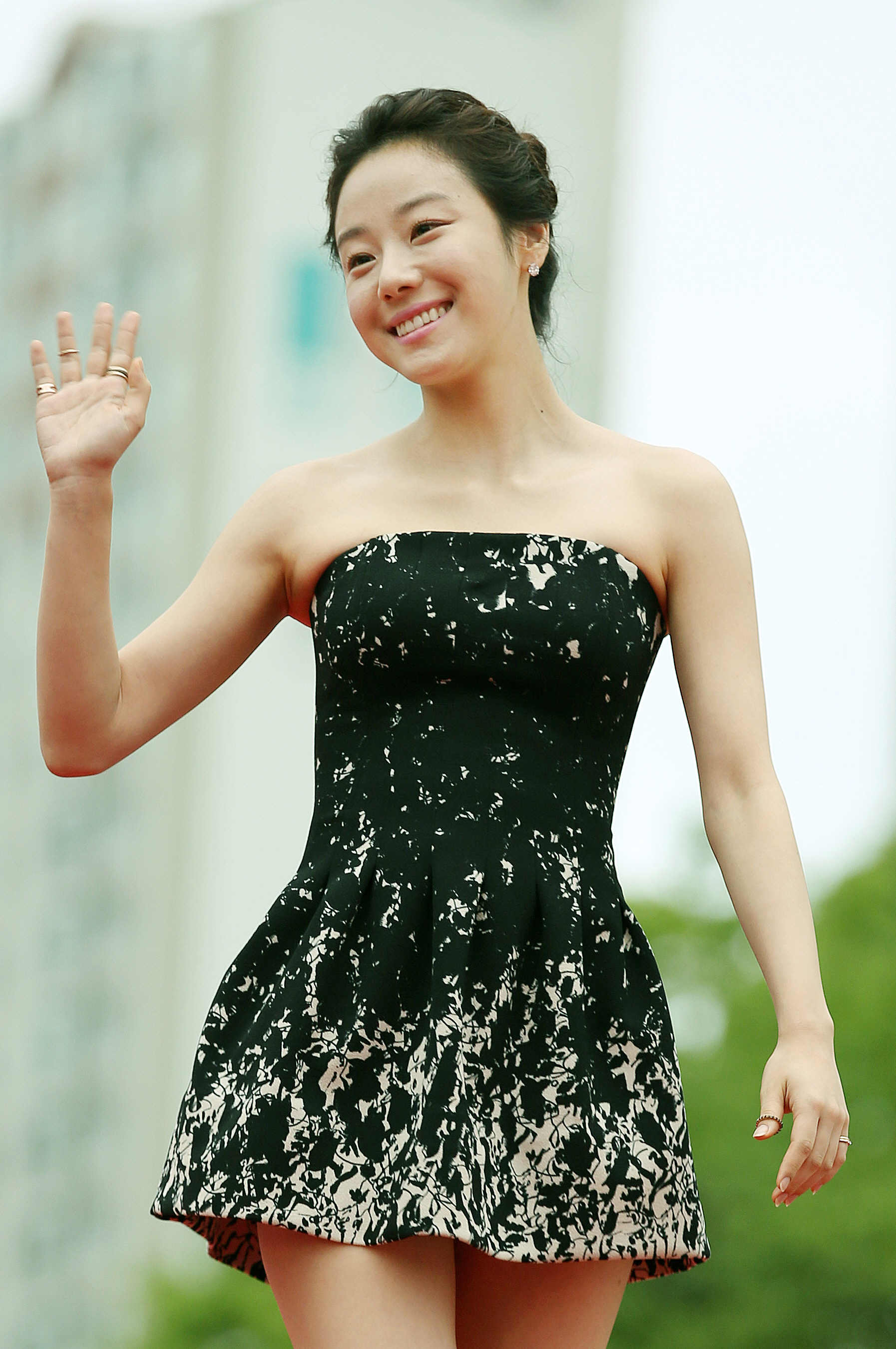
- Lee in 2014
- Born: August 29, 1987 (age 38); Seoul, South Korea
- Education: Seoul National University
- Occupation: Actress
- Years active: 2012–present
- Agent: EL Park
- Spouse: Unknown (m. 2021)
- Children: 1

Korean name
- Hangul: 이시원
- Hanja: 李偲源
- RR: I Siwon
- MR: I Siwŏn
- IPA: i.ɕiwʌn

Lee See-won (Korean: 이시원; born August 29, 1987) is a South Korean actress.

== Personal life ==
Lee attended a wedding ceremony with her non-celebrity boyfriend, who is an alumnus of Seoul National University and had a wedding at the end of June 2021. On May 20, 2025, KX Entertainment announced that Lee had welcomed her first child, a daughter, at the end of April.

== Filmography ==
=== Film ===
Year	Title	Role	Ref.
2013	10 Minutes	Song Eun-hye	
2014	Tinker Ticker	Si-won	
2014	The Tunnel	Yoo-kyung	

=== Television series ===
Year	Title	Role	Ref.
2012	Dream of the Emperor	Princess Boryang	
2014	God's Gift: 14 Days	Lee Soo-jung	
2014	Misaeng: Incomplete Life	Ha Jung-yeon	
2014	Dr. Frost	Song Sul	
2014	Run, Jang-mi	Hwang Tae-hee	
2015	Who Are You: School 2015	Jung Min-young	
2015	Mrs. Cop	Kang Ji-yeon	
2015	All About My Mom	Yoo Ji-yeon	
2015	I Have a Lover	Lee Hae-joo	
2015	Beautiful You	Kim Soo-jin	
2016	Puck!	Ga Yeo-eun	
2016	Marrying My Daughter Twice	Oh Yeong-chae	
2016	A Beautiful Mind	Lee Si-hyeon	
2017	Queen of Mystery	Seo Hyun-soo	
2017	Black	young Choi Soon-jung	
2018	Suits	Se-hee	
2018	Memories of the Alhambra	Lee Soo-jin	
2018	Withdrawal Person	Mi-young	
2019	I Wanna Hear Your Song	Hong Soo-yeong	
2020	Tell Me What You Saw	Han Yi-soo	
2021–2022	Uncle	Song Hwa-eum	
2022	Adamas	Secretary Yoon	
2023–2024	Maestra: Strings of Truth	Lee Ah-jin	

=== Television shows ===
Year	Title	Role	Ref.
2022	LAN Beauty	Host	
2022	History Journal That Day	Host	
2026	Synchro Game	Contestant	

=== Web shows ===
Year	Title	Role	Ref.
2023	The Devil's Plan	Player	
