= Park Ji-yoon (presenter) =

South Korean announcer and presenter

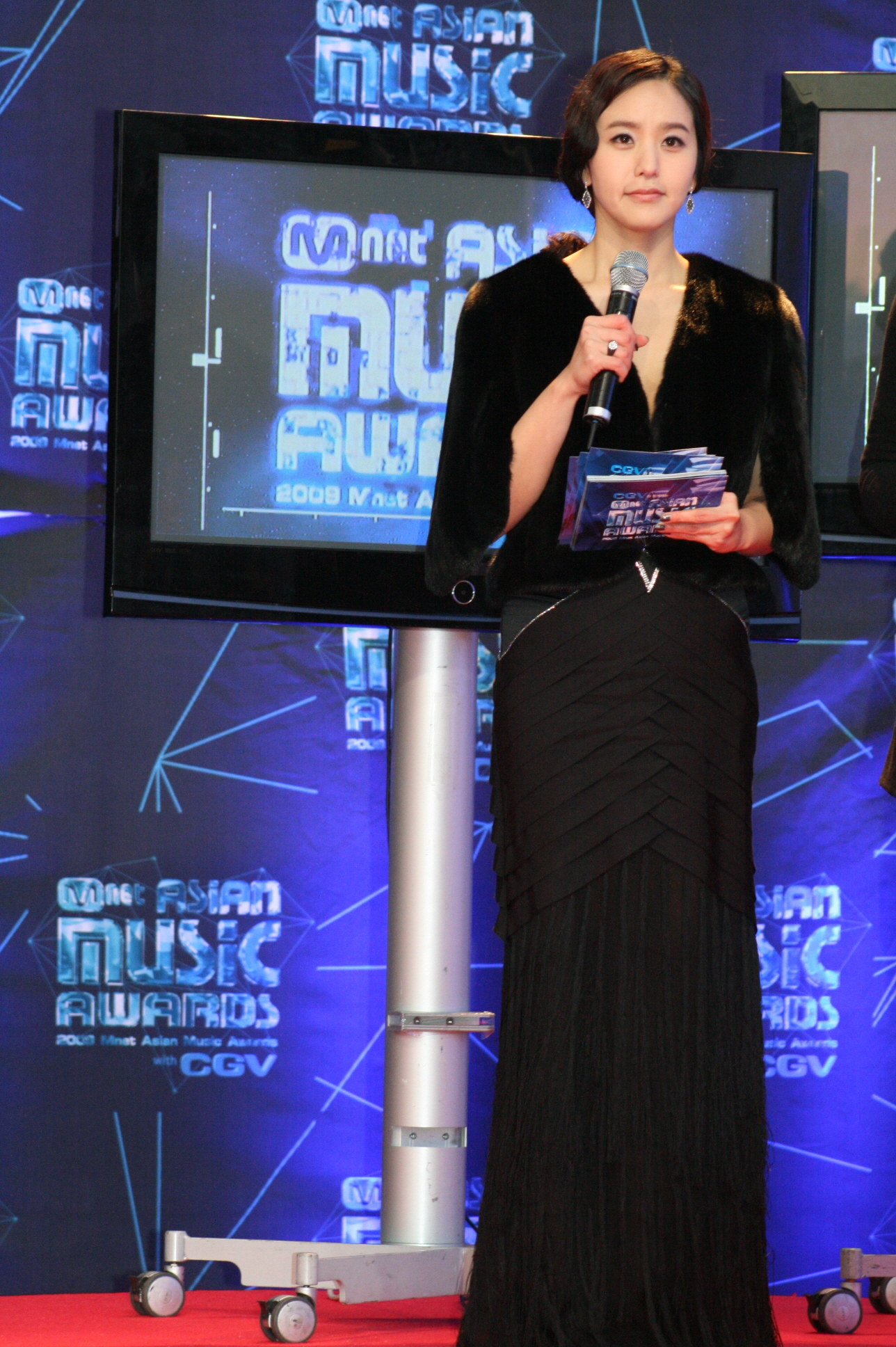
- Ji-yoon in 2009
- Born: March 23, 1979 (age 47); Seoul, South Korea
- Children: 2
- Presenting career
- Country: South Korea

- Park Ji-yoon
- Hangul: 박지윤
- Hanja: 朴芝潤
- RR: Bak Jiyun
- MR: Pak Chiyun

Park Ji-yoon (born March 23, 1979) is a South Korean former announcer and host. She is currently a host of the variety show Gourmet Road and has been a cast member of JTBC's Crime Scene since 2014. Park Ji-yoon married her former fellow KBS presenter Choi Dong-suk on September 11, 2009. She announced their divorce through her agency, JDB Entertainment, on October 31, 2023, after 14 years of marriage.

== Filmography ==
=== TV series ===
Year	Title	Role	Notes
2012–present	Gourmet Road	Herself	
2013–present	Arguments	Herself	
2014–present	Mom's Diary	Herself	
2014–present	I Need Romance	Herself	
2014–present	Crime Scene	Herself	
2014	Come on Baby	Herself	
2015	Crisis Escape No. 1	Herself	

=== Variety shows ===
Year	Title	TV Network	Role	Notes
2016	Battle Trip	KBS2	Contestant	with Lee Won-il (Episode 4)
2018	Battle Trip	KBS2	Contestant	with Choi Dong-seok (Episode 83–84)
2020	Friday Joy Package	tvN	Cast member	
2021	Girls High School Mystery Class	TVING	Cast member	
2021	The Mayhem	SBS FiL	Host	
2021	Save me! Rooms	MBC	Host	
2021	Game of Blood	MBC, Wavve	Host	

=== Web shows ===
Year	Title	Role	Notes	Ref.
2021–2022	Girls High School Mystery Class	Cast Member	Season 2	

== Awards and nominations ==
Year	Award	Category	Nominated work	Result
2006	KBS Entertainment Awards	Best Newcomer Award in Variety		Won
2007	KBS Entertainment Awards	Excellence Award in Variety	Star Golden Bell	Won
2014	Baeksang Art Awards	Best Variety Performer - Female	Gourmet Road	Nominated
