= List of South Korean films of 2006 =

This is a complete list of South Korean films that received a domestic theatrical release in 2006.

Source for release dates and box-office admission results (except where cited otherwise): Koreanfilm.org.

== Box office ==
The highest-grossing South Korean films released in 2006, by domestic box office gross revenue, are as follows:

Highest-grossing films released in 2006
Rank	Title	Distributor	Domestic gross
1	The Host	Showbox	$50,542,207
2	200 Pounds Beauty	Showbox	$27,908,735
3	Tazza: The High Rollers	CJ Entertainment	$27,885,410
4	My Boss, My Teacher	CJ Entertainment	$22,178,824
5	Hanbando	CJ Entertainment	$14,293,891
6	Marrying the Mafia III	Showbox	$11,100,854
7	Maundy Thursday	Prime Entertainment	$10,366,626
8	Forbidden Quest	CJ Entertainment	$10,370,943
9	My Scary Girl	CJ Entertainment	$9,317,632
10	Barefoot Ki-bong	Showbox	$8,493,576

== Films released ==
English/Korean Title	Director	Cast	Released	Admissions	Notes
200 Pounds Beauty 미녀는 괴로워	Kim Yong-hwa	Kim Ah-joong, Joo Jin-mo	December 14, 2006	6,619,498	
Aachi & Ssipak 아치와 씨팍	Jo Beom-jin	Ryoo Seung-bum, Im Chang-jung	June 28, 2006	107,154	Animation.
Ad-lib Night 아주 특별한 손님	Lee Yoon-ki	Han Hyo-joo, Kim Young-min	November 30, 2006	1,956	
Almost Love 청춘만화	Lee Han	Kwon Sang-woo, Kim Ha-neul	March 23, 2006	2,066,354	
Apt. 아파트	Ahn Byeong-ki	Ko So-young, Kang Sung-jin	July 6, 2006	644,893	
Arang 아랑	Ahn Sang-hoon	Song Yoon-ah, Lee Dong-wook	June 28, 2006	1,122,399	
Art of Fighting 싸움의 기술	Shin Han-sol	Baek Yoon-sik, Jae Hee	January 5, 2006	1,313,727	
The Bad Utterances 양아치어조	Jo Beom-gu	Yeo Min-gu, Kim Jong-tae	June 24, 2006	255	
Barefoot Ki-bong 맨발의 기봉이	Kwon Su-gyeong	Shin Hyun-joon, Kim Soo-mi	April 26, 2006	2,347,311	
Between 사이에서	Lee Chang-jae	Lee Hae-kyung, Son Myung-hee	September 7, 2006	24,595	Documentary.
Between Love and Hate 연애, 그 참을 수 없는 가벼움	Kim Hae-gon	Kim Seung-woo, Jang Jin-young	September 7, 2006	668,104	
Bewitching Attraction 여교수의 은밀한 매력	Lee Ha	Moon So-ri, Ji Jin-hee	March 16, 2006	691,735	
Bisang 비상	Im Yoo-cheol		December 14, 2006	39,072	Documentary.
A Bloody Aria 구타유발자들	Won Shin-yun	Han Suk-kyu, Lee Moon-sik	May 31, 2006	164,606	
Bloody Reunion 스승의 은혜	Im Dae-woong	Oh Mi-hee, Seo Young-hee	August 3, 2006	629,452	
Bloody Tie 사생결단	Choi Ho	Ryoo Seung-bum, Hwang Jung-min	April 26, 2006	2,104,716	
Blue Sky 창공으로	Lee In-su	Jung Joon, Kim Bo-kyung	April 21, 2006	25	Also known as With a Blue Sky.
Brainwave 브레인웨이브	Sin Tae-ra	Kim Do-yoon, Jang Se-yoon	August 31, 2006	502	
Cinderella 신데렐라	Bong Man-dae	Do Ji-won, Shin Se-kyung	August 17, 2006	659,122	
The City of Violence 짝패	Ryoo Seung-wan	Ryoo Seung-wan, Jung Doo-hong	May 25, 2006	1,196,520	
Cruel Winter Blues 열혈남아	Lee Jeong-beom	Sul Kyung-gu, Jo Han-sun	November 9, 2006	570,059	
The Customer is Always Right 손님은 왕이다	Oh Ki-hyun	Myeong Kye-nam, Sung Ji-ru, Sung Hyun-ah	February 23, 2006	172,693	
Daisy 데이지	Andrew Lau	Jun Ji-hyun, Jung Woo-sung, Lee Sung-jae	March 9, 2006	1,023,096	
Dark Forest 죽음의 숲 - 어느날 갑자기 네번째 이야기	Kim Jeong-min	So Yi-hyun, Lee Jong-hyuk	August 17, 2006	3,421	Part of the "4 Horror Tales" film series.
Dasepo Naughty Girls 다세포 소녀	E J-yong	Kim Ok-vin, Park Jin-woo	August 10, 2006	561,803	
Detective Odd 공필두	Gong Jeong-shik	Lee Moon-sik, Kim Yoo-mi	May 11, 2006	191,061	Also known as Detective Mr. Gong.
A Dirty Carnival 비열한 거리	Yoo Ha	Zo In-sung, Chun Ho-jin	June 15, 2006	2,047,808	
Don't Look Back 내 청춘에게 고함	Kim Young-nam	Kim Tae-woo, Kim Hye-na	July 13, 2006	13,124	
Educating Kidnappers 잔혹한 출근	Kim Tae-yoon	Kim Soo-ro, Lee Sun-kyun	November 2, 2006	429,546	Also known as A Cruel Attendance.
Family Matters 모두들, 괜찮아요?	Nam Seon-ho	Kim Yu-seok, Kim Ho-jeong	March 24, 2006	4,703	
Family Ties 가족의 탄생	Kim Tae-yong	Moon So-ri, Gong Hyo-jin, Bong Tae-gyu	May 18, 2006	221,925	Won "Best Film" at the 44th Grand Bell Awards.
February 29; 2월 29일 - 어느날 갑자기 첫번째 이야기	Jeong Jong-hoon	Park Eun-hye, Im Ho	July 20, 2006	56,958	Part of the "4 Horror Tales" film series.
Fly, Daddy, Fly 플라이 대디	Choi Jong-tae	Lee Moon-sik, Lee Joon-gi	August 3, 2006	510,604	
Fly High 사랑하니까, 괜찮아	Kwak Ji-kyoon	Ji Hyun-woo, Im Jung-eun	August 17, 2006	254,887	
For Horowitz 호로비츠를 위하여	Kwon Hyung-jin	Uhm Jung-hwa, Shin Eui-jae, Park Yong-woo	May 25, 2006	544,656	Also known as My Piano.
Forbidden Floor 네번째 층 - 어느날 갑자기 두번째 이야기	Kwon Il-soo	Kim Seo-hyung, Kim Yoo-jung	July 27, 2006	31,654	Part of the "4 Horror Tales" film series.
Forbidden Quest 음란서생	Kim Dae-woo	Han Suk-kyu, Lee Beom-soo	February 23, 2006	2,576,022	
The Forgotten Child: Shin Sung-il is Lost 신성일의 행방불명	Shin Jane	Jo Hyun-sik, Ye Soo-jeong	February 16, 2006	1,508	
Les Formidables 강적	Cho Min-ho	Park Joong-hoon, Chun Jung-myung	June 22, 2006	361,155	
The Fox Family 구미호 가족	Lee Hyeong-gon	Joo Hyun, Park Jun-gyu	September 27, 2006	202,990	Musical.
Gangster High 폭력써클	Park Ki-hyung	Jung Kyung-ho, Lee Tae-sung	October 19, 2006	29,110	
Grain in Ear 망종	Zhang Lu	Liu Lian-ji, Jin Bo	March 23, 2006	2,871	A joint production between China and South Korea.
Hanbando 한반도	Kang Woo-suk	Jo Jae-hyun, Cha In-pyo	July 13, 2006	3,880,808	
Heart Is... 마음이...	Oh Dal-gyun	Yoo Seung-ho, Kim Hyang-gi, Dali	October 25, 2006	1,042,166	Also known as Hearty Paws.
Holiday 홀리데이	Yang Yun-ho	Lee Sung-jae, Choi Min-soo	January 19, 2006	1,458,896	
Holy Daddy 원탁의 천사	Kwon Seong-guk	Lee Min-woo, Ha Dong-hoon	August 24, 2006	508,285	
The Host 괴물	Bong Joon-ho	Song Kang-ho, Park Hae-il, Bae Doona, Byun Hee-bong, Go Ah-sung	July 27, 2006	13,019,740	Korean box office record holder for admissions. Won "Best Picture" at the 27th Blue Dragon Film Awards, "Best Film" at the 43rd Baeksang Arts Awards, "Best Film" at the 5th Korean Film Awards, and "Best Picture" at the inaugural Asian Film Awards.
Host and Guest 방문자	Shin Dong-il	Kim Jae-rok, Kang Ji-hwan	November 15, 2006	3,201	
Hot for Teacher 누가 그녀와 잤을까?	Kim Yoo-seong	Kim Sa-rang, Ha Seok-jin, Park Jun-gyu	November 16, 2006	434,877	Also known as Sexy Teacher and Who Slept With Her.
How the Lack of Love Affects Two Men 애정결핍이 두 남자에게 미치는 영향	Kim Seong-hun	Baek Yoon-sik, Bong Tae-gyu	November 16, 2006	593,277	
I'm a Cyborg, But That's OK 싸이보그지만 괜찮아	Park Chan-wook	Im Soo-jung, Rain	December 7, 2006	739,393	
Ice Bar 아이스케키	Yeo In-kwang	Shin Ae-ra, Park Ji-bin	August 24, 2006	516,492	
If You Were Me 2 다섯 개의 시선	Park Kyung-hee, Ryoo Seung-wan, Jung Ji-woo, Jang Jin, Kim Dong-won	Jeong Eun-hye, Kim Su-hyun, Seo Ju-hee, Ahn Gil-kang	January 13, 2006	12,621	Five short films by different directors; financed by the National Human Rights Commission of Korea.
If You Were Me 3 세 번째 시선	Jeong Yoon-cheol, Kim Hyun-pil, Lee Mi-yeon, Noh Dong-seok, Kim Gok & Kim Sun, Hong Ki-seon	Chayan Kolsak, Hwang Seon-hwa, Kim Yo-han, Kim Tae-woo	November 23, 2006	3,811	Six short films by different directors; financed by the National Human Rights Commission of Korea.
The Legend of Seven Cutter 카리스마 탈출기	Kwon Nam-gi	Ahn Jae-mo, Yoon Eun-hye	March 30, 2006	102,742	
Like a Virgin 천하장사 마돈나	Lee Hae-young, Lee Hae-jun	Ryu Deok-hwan, Baek Yoon-sik	August 31, 2006	678,930	
Lost in Love 사랑을 놓치다	Choo Chang-min	Sul Kyung-gu, Song Yoon-ah	January 26, 2006	529,138	
Love Me Not 사랑따윈 필요없어	Lee Cheol-ha	Kim Joo-hyuk, Moon Geun-young	November 9, 2006	548,998	
Love Phobia 도마뱀	Kang Ji-eun	Kang Hye-jung, Cho Seung-woo	April 26, 2006	397,913	
Lump Sugar 각설탕	Lee Hwan-gyeong	Im Soo-jung, Park Eun-su	August 10, 2006	1,446,820	
The Magicians 마법사들	Song Il-gon	Jung Woong-in, Jang Hyun-sung	March 30, 2006	6,300	
Marrying the Mafia III 가문의 부활 - 가문의 영광 3	Jeong Yong-ki	Shin Hyun-joon, Im Hyeong-joon, Tak Jae-hoon	September 21, 2006	3,464,516	The third film in the "Marrying the Mafia" series.
Maundy Thursday 우리들의 행복한 시간	Song Hae-sung	Kang Dong-won, Lee Na-young	September 14, 2006	3,132,320	
Midnight Ballad for Ghost Theater 삼거리 극장	Jeon Gye-su	Kim Kkot-bi, Chun Ho-jin	November 23, 2006	17,216	Musical. Also known as The Ghost Theater.
A Millionaire's First Love 백만장자의 첫사랑	Kim Tae-gyun	Hyun Bin, Lee Yeon-hee	February 9, 2006	639,596	
Mission Sex Control 잘 살아보세	Ahn Jin-woo	Lee Beom-soo, Kim Jung-eun	September 28, 2006	275,739	
Monopoly 모노폴리	Lee Hang-bae	Yang Dong-geun, Kim Sung-soo	June 1, 2006	394,935	
Moodori 무도리	Lee Hyeong-seon	Seo Young-hee, Park In-hwan, Choi Ju-bong	September 21, 2006	70,969	
Mr. Wacky 생, 날선생	Kim Dong-wook	Park Gun-hyung, Kim Hyo-jin	May 25, 2006	264,525	
My Boss, My Teacher 투사부일체	Kim Dong-won	Jung Joon-ho, Jung Woong-in, Kim Sang-joong	January 19, 2006	6,105,431	Sequel to the 2001 film My Boss, My Hero.
My Captain, Mr. Underground 마이 캡틴 김대출	Song Chang-su	Jung Jae-young, Jang Seo-hee	April 20, 2006	122,098	
My Scary Girl 달콤, 살벌한 연인	Son Jae-gon	Park Yong-woo, Choi Kang-hee	April 6, 2006	2,286,745	
My Wife Is a Gangster 3 조폭 마누라 3	Jo Jin-kyu	Shu Qi, Lee Beom-soo	December 28, 2006	1,690,465	The third film in the "My Wife Is a Gangster" series.
No Mercy for the Rude 예의없는 것들	Park Cheol-hee	Shin Ha-kyun, Yoon Ji-hye	August 24, 2006	904,802	
No Regret 후회하지 않아	Lee-Song Hee-il	Lee Yeong-hoon, Lee Han	November 16, 2006	43,265	
Now and Forever 연리지	Kim Seong-joong	Choi Ji-woo, Jo Han-sun	April 13, 2006	136,088	
Oh! My God 구세주	Kim Jeong-woo	Choi Sung-kook, Shin Yi	February 16, 2006	1,858,668	
Old Miss Diary 올드 미스 다이어리 극장판	Kim Seok-yoon	Ye Ji-won, Ji Hyun-woo	December 20, 2006	856,090	
On the Road, Two 온 더 로드, 투	Kim Tae-yong	Yoon Do-hyun Band	January 5, 2006	479	Documentary.
One Shining Day 눈부신 하루	Kim Sung-ho, Kim Jong-kwan, Min Dong-hyun	Lee So-yeon, Yukie Mori, Kim Dong-young	February 23, 2006	1,630	An omnibus film consisting of three stories; commissioned on the 60th anniversary of Korea's liberation.
Once in a Summer 그해 여름	Joh Keun-shik	Lee Byung-hun, Soo Ae	November 30, 2006	336,065	
Over the Border 국경의 남쪽	Ahn Pan-seok	Cha Seung-won, Jo Yi-jin	May 4, 2006	252,457	Also known as South of the Border.
The Peter Pan Formula 피터팬의 공식	Cho Chang-ho	On Joo-wan, Kim Ho-jung	April 13, 2006	2,536	
The Promise 무극	Chen Kaige	Jang Dong-gun, Cecilia Cheung	January 26, 2006	798,091	A joint production between China and South Korea.
The Pumpkin 호박전	Yu Jin-hee	Kim Seo-young, Chung Misook	June 22, 2006	1,651	Animation.
Puzzle 두뇌유희 프로젝트, 퍼즐	Kim Tae-kyung	Joo Jin-mo, Moon Sung-keun	September 14, 2006	270,779	
Radio Star 라디오 스타	Lee Joon-ik	Ahn Sung-ki, Park Joong-hoon	September 27, 2006	1,879,501	
The Restless 중천	Jo Dong-oh	Jung Woo-sung, Kim Tae-hee	December 20, 2006	1,531,075	
Righteous Ties 거룩한 계보	Jang Jin	Jung Jae-young, Jung Joon-ho	October 19, 2006	1,744,677	
Road 길	Bae Chang-ho	Bae Chang-ho, Kang Gi-hwa	November 2, 2006	1,856	
Romance 로망스	Moon Seung-wook	Jo Jae-hyun, Kim Ji-soo	March 16, 2006	424,514	
Roommates; D-day - 어느날 갑자기 세번째 이야기	Kim Eun-kyung	Lee Eun-sung, Yu Joo-hee	August 3, 2006	19,488	Part of the "4 Horror Tales" film series.
Running Wild 야수	Kim Seong-su	Kwon Sang-woo, Yoo Ji-tae	January 12, 2006	1,016,152	
Seducing Mr. Perfect; Mr. 로빈 꼬시기	Kim Sang-woo	Uhm Jung-hwa, Daniel Henney	December 7, 2006	730,443	
See You After School 방과후 옥상	Lee Seok-hoon	Bong Tae-gyu, Kim Tae-hyun	March 16, 2006	891,417	
Shark Bait 파이 스토리	Howard E. Baker, John Fox, Lee Kyung-ho	Kim Hyung-jun, Park Myung-soo, Im Chae-moo	July 6, 2006	267,588	Animation. A joint production between South Korea and the USA.
Silk Shoes 비단구두	Yeo Kyun-dong	Choi Deok-moon, Lee Seong-min	June 22, 2006	759	
Solace 사랑할 때 이야기하는 것들	Byun Seung-wook	Han Suk-kyu, Kim Ji-soo	November 30, 2006	216,876	
Ssunday Seoul 썬데이 서울	Park Seong-hoon	Bong Tae-gyu, Lee Chung-ah	February 9, 2006	46,239	
Sundays in August 팔월의 일요일들	Lee Jin-woo	Yang Eun-yong, Im Hyeong-guk	September 29, 2006	1,856	
Sunflower 해바라기	Kang Seok-beom	Kim Rae-won, Kim Hae-sook	November 23, 2006	1,543,429	
Tazza: The High Rollers 타짜	Choi Dong-hoon	Cho Seung-woo, Kim Hye-soo	September 27, 2006	6,847,777	
Three Fellas 뚝방전설	Jo Beom-gu	Park Gun-hyung, Lee Chun-hee	September 7, 2006	418,445	Also known as Ddukbang / Bar Legend / Riverbank Legends.
Time 시간	Kim Ki-duk	Sung Hyun-ah, Ha Jung-woo	August 24, 2006	28,414	
Traces of Love 가을로	Kim Dae-seung	Yoo Ji-tae, Kim Ji-soo, Uhm Ji-won	October 25, 2006	707,820	
Vampire Cop Ricky 흡혈형사 나도열	Lee Si-myung	Kim Soo-ro, Jo Yeo-jeong	February 9, 2006	1,824,822	
Way To Go, Rose 달려라 장미	Kim Eung-su	Choi Ban-ya, Kim Tae-hoon	February 10, 2006	881	
Woman on the Beach 해변의 여인	Hong Sang-soo	Kim Seung-woo, Go Hyun-jung	August 31, 2006	225,388	
The World of Silence 조용한 세상	Cho Ui-seok	Kim Sang-kyung, Park Yong-woo	December 14, 2006	178,434	

== See also ==
- 2006 in South Korea
- 2006 in South Korean music
- Box office number-one films of 2006 (South Korea)
