= Wi Ha-joon =

South Korean actor (born 1991)

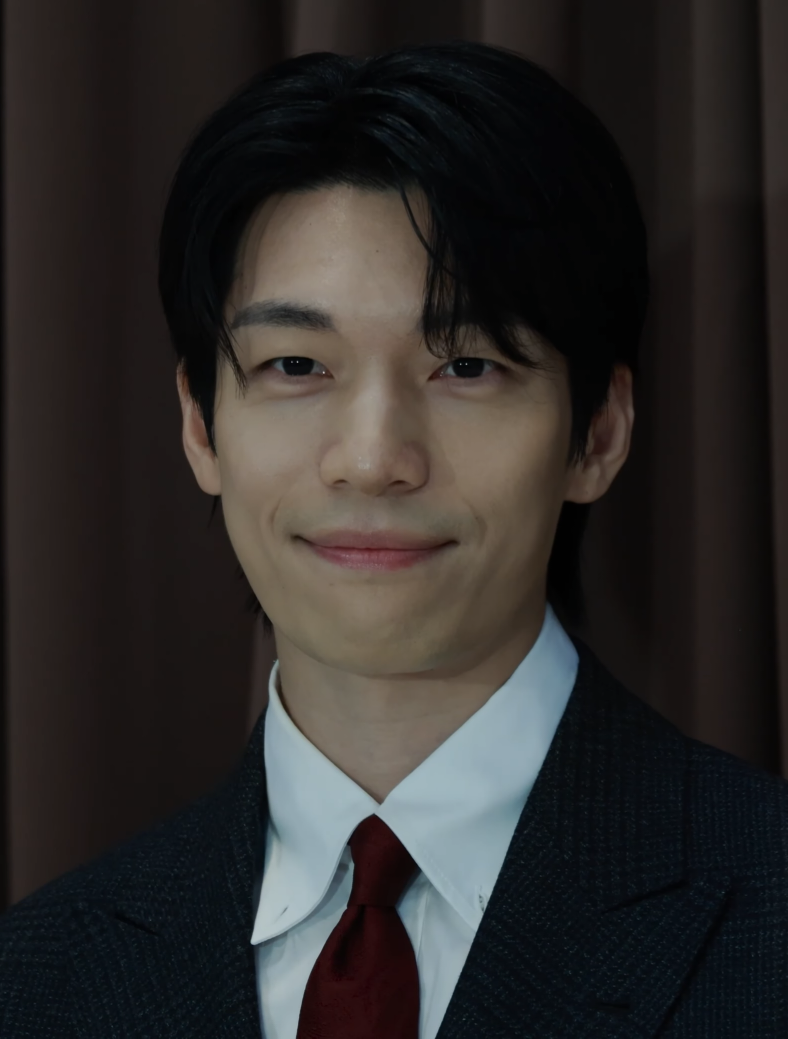
- Wi in October 2025
- Born: Wi Hyun-yi; August 5, 1991 (age 35); Wando County, South Jeolla Province, South Korea
- Education: Sungkyul University
- Occupation: Actor
- Years active: 2012–present
- Agent: MSTeam Entertainment

Korean name
- Hangul: 위현이
- RR: Wi Hyeoni
- MR: Wi Hyŏni

Stage name
- Hangul: 위하준
- RR: Wi Hajun
- MR: Wi Hajun

Wi Hyun-yi (Korean: 위현이; August 5, 1991), known professionally as Wi Ha-joon (위하준), is a South Korean actor. He is best known for his role as Hwang Jun-ho in Netflix's Squid Game (2021–2025). Wi has also starred in the films Gonjiam: Haunted Asylum (2018), Shark: The Beginning (2021) and Midnight (2021), as well as the television series Something in the Rain (2018), Romance Is a Bonus Book (2019), 18 Again (2020), Bad and Crazy (2021), Little Women (2022), The Worst of Evil (2023), and The Midnight Romance in Hagwon (2024). In 2022, Wi was named one of GQ Korea's Men of the Year. Wi is managed by MSTeam Entertainment.

== Early life and education ==
Wi was born, as Wi Hyun-yi, on August 5, 1991,on the island of Soando in Wanju County, South Jeolla Province, and grew up on his family's abalone farm. During high school, he joined a dance club in his spare time. Other than that, he was also the student body president.

He had a math and English instructor. Because of that, despite living in a small town, his English grammar skills were always ahead of his peers. Ironically, his worst subject was language.

While his teachers expected him to get into a good university through rural admission, he rejected that idea, and left a letter to his parents before going to Seoul to do theatre and film. During the first semester, he felt it was a waste and dropped out in order to continue his military services. After being discharged, he continued in his studies.

== Career ==
Wi made his acting debut in 2012, starring in the short film Peace in Them. Wi made small appearances in several films, before he was cast in a main role in the 2018 film Gonjiam: Haunted Asylum. The same year, he appeared in a supporting role in the television series Something in the Rain.

In 2019, Wi appeared in the television series Romance Is a Bonus Book alongside Lee Jong-suk, Lee Na-young and Jung Yoo-jin. The series received positive reviews and Wi was praised for his acting, earning a nomination for Best New Actor - Television at the 55th Baeksang Arts Awards. In 2020, Wi appeared as a famous baseball athlete in the television series 18 Again, based on the American film 17 Again.

Wi received international recognition in 2021 for his role in the hit Netflix series Squid Game, portraying the character Hwang Jun-ho, a police officer who sneaks into the game to find his missing brother. The cast was praised by critics for their acting and the show itself won numerous awards, including six Primetime Emmy Awards and the Grand Prize at the 58th Baeksang Arts Awards. Wi reprised his role as Hwang Jun-ho in both the second season (2024) and third season (2025).

In 2021, Wi also played a serial killer in the thriller film Midnight, and starred alongside Lee Dong-wook in the television series Bad and Crazy. Wi returned in 2022 with the Netflix series Little Women. The series achieved double-digit ratings for its final episode in South Korea.

In 2023, Wi starred in the Disney+ series The Worst of Evil alongside Ji Chang-wook and Im Se-mi, and the Netflix series Gyeongseong Creature alongside Park Seo-joon, Han So-hee, Soo Hyun, Kim Hae-sook and Jo Han-chul.

In 2026, Wi starred in TvN's romantic thriller Siren's Kiss. It is based on the 1999 Japanese television series Ice World by Hisashi Nozawa, which follows an insurance investigator tracking a series of fraud cases leading to a woman related to several deaths.

== Filmography ==
Key
†	Denotes films that have not yet been released

=== Film ===
Year	Title	Role	Notes	Ref.
2012	Peace in Them	Ji-hwan	Short film	
2015	Coin Locker Girl	Woo-gon (young)		
2015	Bad Guys Always Die	Cha Myung-ho	China-South Korean co-production	
2016	Eclipse	Jung-tae		
2017	Anarchist from Colony	Korean youth in prison		
2017	The Chase	Na Jung-hyuk (young)		
2018	Gonjiam: Haunted Asylum	Ha-joon		
2019	Miss & Mrs. Cops	Jung Woo-jun		
2021	Shark: The Beginning	Jeong Do-hyeon		
2021	Midnight	Do-shik		

=== Television series ===
Year	Title	Role	Notes	Ref.
2016	Goodbye Mr. Black	Ha-joon		
2017	My Golden Life	Ryu Jae-shin		
2018	Something in the Rain	Yoon Seung-ho		
2018	Matrimonial Chaos	Im Si-ho		
2019	Romance Is a Bonus Book	Ji Seo-joon		
2020	Soul Mechanic	Oh Yoo-min	Cameo (Episode 1 and 4)	
2020	18 Again	Ye Ji-hoon		
2021–2025	Squid Game	Hwang Jun-ho	Season 1–3	
2021–2022	Bad and Crazy	K		
2022	Little Women	Choi Do-il		
2023	The Worst of Evil	Jung Gi-cheol		
2023–2024	Gyeongseong Creature	Kwon Jun-taek	Season 1	
2024	The Midnight Romance in Hagwon	Lee Jun-ho		
2025	Shark: The Storm	Jeong Do-hyeon	Cameo	
2026	Siren's Kiss	Cha Woo-seok		

=== Web series ===
Year	Title	Role	Notes	Ref.
2018	With Coffee	Lee Ha-min		

== Discography ==
=== Soundtrack appearances ===
Title	Year	Album
"Maybe It's Too Late" (늦은 거겠지)	2018	Matrimonial Chaos OST Part 2

== Ambassadorship ==
- Public relations ambassador from Soan-myeon (2022)

== Accolades ==
=== Awards and nominations ===
Name of the award ceremony, year presented, category, nominee of the award, and the result of the nomination
Award ceremony	Year	Category	Nominee / Work	Result	Ref.
Screen Actors Guild Awards	2022	Outstanding Performance by an Ensemble in a Drama Series	Squid Game	Nominated	
Baeksang Arts Awards	2019	Best New Actor – Television	Romance Is a Bonus Book	Nominated	
Blue Dragon Film Awards	2018	Best New Actor	Gonjiam: Haunted Asylum	Nominated	
Chunsa Film Art Awards	2018	Best New Actor	Gonjiam: Haunted Asylum	Nominated	
Grand Bell Awards	2018	Best New Actor	Gonjiam: Haunted Asylum	Nominated	
Korea Drama Awards	2018	Best New Actor	Something in the Rain	Nominated	

=== Listicles ===
Name of publisher, year listed, name of listicle, and placement
Publisher	Year	Listicle	Placement	Ref.
Cine21	2021	New Actors that will lead Korean Video Content Industry in 2022	5th (Note: mentioned together with Rowoon, Kim Seon-ho, Song Kang, Byeon Woo-seok, Lee Jun-young)	
Cine21	2021	Actors that will lead Korean Video Content Industry in 2022	6th (Note: mentioned together with Kim Seon-ho, Kim Soo-hyun, Jo Jung-suk, Park Jeong-min, Song Kang-ho, Ma Dong-seok, Ahn Bo-hyun, Ryu Jun-yeol, Choi Woo-shik)	
