= February 29 (film) =

2006 Film directed by Jeong Jong-hoon

- Theatrical release poster
- Directed by: Jeong Jong-hoon
- Written by: Jeong Jong-hoon
- Produced by: Ahn Byeong-ki
- Starring: Park Eun-hye; Im Ho; Lee Myeong-jin; Im Hyeon-kyeong; Kim Jae-man
- Cinematography: Kim Hoon-kwang
- Edited by: Park Se-hui
- Music by: Oh Bong-jun
- Distributed by: CJ Entertainment
- Release date: June 20, 2006
- Running time: 90 minutes
- Country: South Korea
- Language: Korean
- Budget: $1 million

February 29 (Korean: 2월 29일; RR: 2wol 29il) is a 2006 South Korean film and the first installment of the 4 Horror Tales film series. It was followed by Forbidden Floor, Roommates and Dark Forest.

== Plot ==
In this tale Ji-yeon is a tollgate ticket girl who is frightened by the driver of a mysterious black car when he hands her a bloodstained ticket at midnight. Her fear deepens after her colleague, Jong-sook, tells her that 12 years earlier a prisoner transport vehicle caused a traffic accident wherein all the prisoners involved died - and some of the corpses disappeared. Since then, a murder has occurred near the tollgate on February 29, every four years. Calamity soon follows.
