= Min-hee =

- Hangul: 민희
- RR: Minhui
- MR: Minhŭi

Min-hee is a Korean given name.

People with this name include:

- Suk Min-hee (born 1968), South Korean handball player
- Kim Min-hee (actress, born 1972), South Korean actress
- Jeon Min-hee (born 1975), South Korean fantasy writer
- Lee Min-hee (born 1980), South Korean handball player
- Kim Min-hee (actress, born 1982), South Korean actress
- Bae Min-hee (born 1988), South Korean handball player
- Kang Min-hee (born 1991), South Korean singer, member of Miss S

== See also ==
- List of Korean given names
- Kim Min-hee (disambiguation)
