= Kim Min-hee =

- Hangul: 김민희
- RR: Gim Minhui
- MR: Kim Minhŭi

Kim Min-hee (Korean: 김민희) is a Korean name consisting of the family name Kim and the given name Min-hee, and may also refer to:

- Kim Min-hee (actress, born 1972), South Korean actress
- Kim Min-hee (actress, born 1982), South Korean actress
