= Love on a Rooftop (South Korean TV series) =

- Promotional poster
- Also known as: I Love You from Today; Love from Today
- Genre: Romance; Drama; Family
- Written by: Choi Min-ki; Kim Ji-wan
- Directed by: Choi Ji-young
- Starring: Im Se-mi; Park Jin-woo; Kim Se-jung
- Country of origin: South Korea
- Original language: Korean
- No. of episodes: 101

Production
- Running time: 35 minutes
- Production companies: AStory Co., Ltd. Curtain Call Media

Original release
- Network: KBS2
- Release: April 6 – August 28, 2015

Love on a Rooftop (Korean: 오늘부터 사랑해; RR: Oneulbuteo saranghae; lit. 'I Love You from Today') is a 2015 South Korean television drama starring Im Se-mi and Park Jin-woo. It aired on KBS2 on Mondays to Fridays at 19:50 for 101 episodes, beginning April 6, 2015.

== Plot ==
Set in a 450-year-old house named "Dongrakdang" in Bukchon Hanok Village, Yoon Seung-hye and the people around her must deal with the aftermath of her adoption and its dissolution.

== Cast ==
=== Main characters ===
- Im Se-mi as Yoon Seung-hye
- Park Jin-woo as Kang Do-jin
- Ban Se-jung as Jang Se-ryung

=== Supporting characters ===
- Kim Yong-rim as Kim Soon-im (Seung-hye's grandmother)
- Ahn Nae-sang as Yoon Dae-ho (Seung-hye's father)
- Kim Seo-ra as Han Dong-sook (Seung-hye's mother)
- Oh Seung-yoon as Yoon Seung-jae (Seung-hye's younger brother)
- Jo Yun-seo as Yoon Seung-ah (Seung-hye's younger sister)
- Choo So-young as Yoon Dae-shil (Seung-hye's aunt and Gyung-tae's Wife)
- Lee Eung-kyung as Yang Mi-ja (Do-jin's mother)
- Heo Jung-kyu as Bae Sang-man (Mi-ja's secretary)
- Lee Chang-wook as Oh Gyung-tae (Do-jin's best friend and Dae-shil's husband)
- Kim Byung-se as Jang Beom-seok (Se-ryung's father)
- Go Yoon as Jung Yoon-ho
- Jo Eun-sook as Han Sun-sook
- Jo Hee-bong as Byun Joon-bae
- Hahm Eun-jung as Min Chae-won
- Jang Jae-wan as Byun Dong-gu

=== Cameo appearances ===
- Oh Soon-tae
- Jung Sang-hoon
- Yoon Ki-won as Hong Seok-choon

== Ratings ==
- In this table, The blue numbers represent the lowest ratings and the red numbers represent the highest ratings.

Episode #	Original broadcast date	Average audience share			
Episode #	Original broadcast date	TNmS Ratings		AGB Nielsen	
Episode #	Original broadcast date	Nationwide	Seoul National Capital Area	Nationwide	Seoul National Capital Area
1	April 6, 2015	19.0% (2nd)	18.3% (2nd)	18.2% (3rd)	18.8% (3rd)
2	April 7, 2015	17.7% (2nd)	16.2% (3rd)	17.7% (2nd)	17.9% (2nd)
3	April 8, 2015	16.3% (3rd)	14.7% (4th)	14.8% (3rd)	15.1% (3rd)
4	April 9, 2015	15.2% (4th)	14.0% (5th)	14.6% (3rd)	15.1% (3rd)
5	April 10, 2015	15.0% (4th)	14.2% (5th)	13.7% (4th)	13.6% (6th)
6	April 13, 2015	16.7% (4th)	15.4% (5th)	15.1% (3rd)	15.6% (4th)
7	April 14, 2015	17.0% (4th)	15.6% (5th)	14.6% (3rd)	15.5% (3rd)
8	April 15, 2015	14.9% (4th)	12.9% (5th)	13.8% (4th)	13.5% (5th)
9	April 16, 2015	16.0% (4th)	13.8% (5th)	15.6% (3rd)	15.3% (3rd)
10	April 17, 2015	15.0% (4th)	13.5% (6th)	13.8% (4th)	13.4% (4th)
11	April 20, 2015	15.7% (4th)	14.2% (5th)	15.3% (3rd)	15.3% (4th)
12	April 21, 2015	16.1% (3rd)	14.4% (5th)	16.3% (3rd)	16.1% (3rd)
13	April 22, 2015	14.0% (5th)	11.9% (6th)	13.3% (5th)	13.0% (4th)
14	April 23, 2015	14.4% (4th)	13.3% (5th)	13.6% (5th)	14.4% (4th)
15	April 24, 2015	14.0% (4th)	12.9% (6th)	13.7% (5th)	14.0% (4th)
16	April 27, 2015	15.4% (4th)	12.5% (6th)	14.8% (3rd)	15.2% (3rd)
17	April 28, 2015	16.2% (4th)	14.1% (6th)	15.0% (3rd)	14.8% (3rd)
18	April 29, 2015	14.6% (5th)	12.0% (6th)	14.1% (5th)	13.8% (4th)
19	April 30, 2015	14.9% (5th)	14.3% (5th)	14.3% (5th)	14.5% (5th)
20	May 1, 2015	13.3% (6th)	13.3% (7th)	11.8% (7th)	12.0% (6th)
Average		%	%	%	%

== Awards and nominations ==
Year	Award	Category	Recipient	Result
2015	29th KBS Drama Awards	Excellence Award, Actor in a Daily Drama	Ahn Nae-sang	Nominated
2015	29th KBS Drama Awards	Excellence Award, Actress in a Daily Drama	Im Se-mi	Nominated
2015	29th KBS Drama Awards	Best Supporting Actress	Jo Eun-sook	Nominated
2015	29th KBS Drama Awards	Best New Actress	Jo Yun-seo	Nominated
