= Lee Kye-in =

South Korean actor (born 1952)

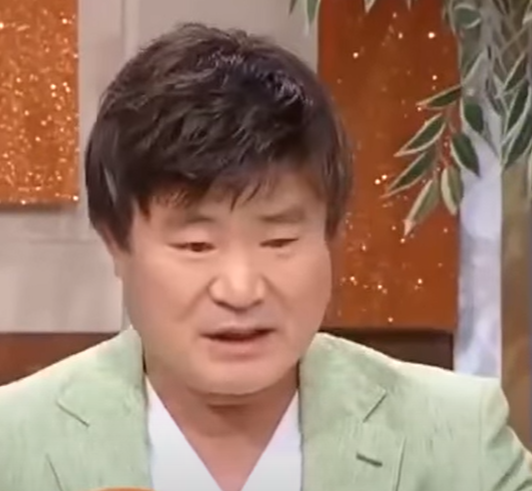
- Lee in 2013
- Born: May 16, 1952 (age 74); Incheon, South Korea
- Education: Incheon City College
- Occupation: Actor
- Years active: 1972–present

Korean name
- Hangul: 이계인
- Hanja: 李桂仁
- RR: I Gyein
- MR: I Kyein

Lee Kye-in (born May 16, 1952) is a South Korean actor. Among his notable television series are Chief Inspector (1972-1989), Country Diaries (1980-2002), Emperor Wang Gun (2000-2002), and Jumong (2006-2007).

== Filmography ==
=== Film ===
Year	Title	Role
1978	Butterfly Maiden	
1978	The Woman I Betrayed	
1978	The Arch of Triumph	
1979	The Rose That Swallowed Thorns	
1979	The Third Han-gang Bridge	
1981	An Embrace in the Dark Night	
1981	Is There a Girl Like Her?	
1982	Wild Horse	
1983	A Forbidden Love	
1984	The Tiger That Doesn't Cry	
1985	Half-eaten Cherry Apple	
1985	The Miss and the Cadet	
1986	Osaka Godfather	
1986	Woman's Wail	
1987	Tango in Seoul	
1987	Hunting Night	
1988	Sunshine at Present	Young man 1
1988	Love's Scribble	Joon-tae
1994	The Man Who Cannot Kiss	Jong-gil
2007	Scout	(cameo)
2008	Black Heart (aka Beyond All Magic)	Mr. Jung
2009	White Tuft, the Little Beaver	(voice, Korean dubbed)
2015	I'm Sorry, I Love You, Thank You	
2017	My Little Baby, Jaya	

=== Television series ===
Year	Title	Role
1972	Chief Inspector	
1979	Ottoki Squad	
1979	Mom Likes Dad	
1980	Daughter	
1980	Country Diaries	Gwi-dong
1983	Cheers	
1987	Love and Ambition	Oh Sung-kyun
1988	500 Years of Joseon: Memoirs of Lady Hyegyeong	Moon Sung-gook
1989	Great Challenge	
1990	500 Years of Joseon: Daewongun	Jang Soon-gyu
1991	The Dictionary of the Language for Happiness	
1993	MBC Best Theater "Love on a Cloudy Day"	
1995	Korea Gate	Heo Sam-su
1995	Kim Gu	Watanabe's son
1996	Hometown of Legends	
1997	Ambition	Yong-pal
1997	Medical Brothers	
1997	Myth of a Hero	Captain Do
1997	Revenge and Passion	Weasel
1998	Three Kim Generation	Choi Hyung-woo
1998	Legendary Ambition	Yong-jae
1998	Hong Gil-dong	Il-won 2
1999	Did We Really Love?	Seo Dal-kwon
1999	You Don't Know My Mind	
1999	Hur Jun	
2000	Cummi, the Fairy	Battalion commander Beo-geu
2000	Taejo Wang Geon	Ae-sul
2000	Mr. Duke	Department head Jo
2001	The Merchant	Bae Soon-tak
2002	Remember	Section chief
2002	Inspector Park Mun-su	Kkae-chil-yi
2003	Fairy and Swindler	
2003	Age of Warriors	
2003	Drama City "Crazy Man, Kang Sung-man"	
2004	The Age of Heroes	Chun Tae-sool
2006	Yeon Gaesomun	Qibi Heli
2006	Jumong	Mo Pal-mo
2007	Medical Gibang Cinema	Husband Jo
2008	Aster	Young-jong
2008	I Am Happy	Lee Chul-gon
2009	The Return of Iljimae	Jeol-chi
2009	Strike Love	Oh Hye-sung's father
2010	Dong Yi	Oh Tae-poong
2011	Warrior Baek Dong-soo	Yeo Cho-sang
2013	Hur Jun, The Original Story	Dol-swe
2013	Shining Romance	Mr. Oh (cameo)

=== Television show ===
Year	Title	Notes/Ref.
2004	Comedy File	
2004	Show! Lucky Train	
2006	Laughter Station	
2006	Sunday Sunday Night	
2007	7 Octave	
2007	Jiwhaza	
2007	Cool Times, Game Song	Cast member
2008	Bokbulbok - Season 1	
2010	셔틀탈출기 내가 용자라니	Cast member
2010	Global Family Lee's In Laws	Cast member
2011	Poker Face - Season 2	Cast member
2012-2013	Reckless Family - Season 2	Cast member
2013	MasterChef Korea Celebrity	Contestant
2014	Taste of Hand	
2015	Again	
2022	The President's People	Cast Member

=== Music video appearances ===
Year	Song title	Artist
2007	"Hiya"	Coolapica

== Awards and nominations ==
Year	Award	Category	Nominated work	Result
1986	MBC Drama Awards	Excellence Award, Actor		Won
2006	MBC Drama Awards	Special Acting Award, Veteran Actor	Jumong	Won
2006	MBC Drama Awards	Popularity Award	Jumong	Nominated
2008	SBS Drama Awards	Best Supporting Actor in a Serial Drama	I Am Happy	Nominated
