= Lee Won-jong =

South Korean actor (born 1966)

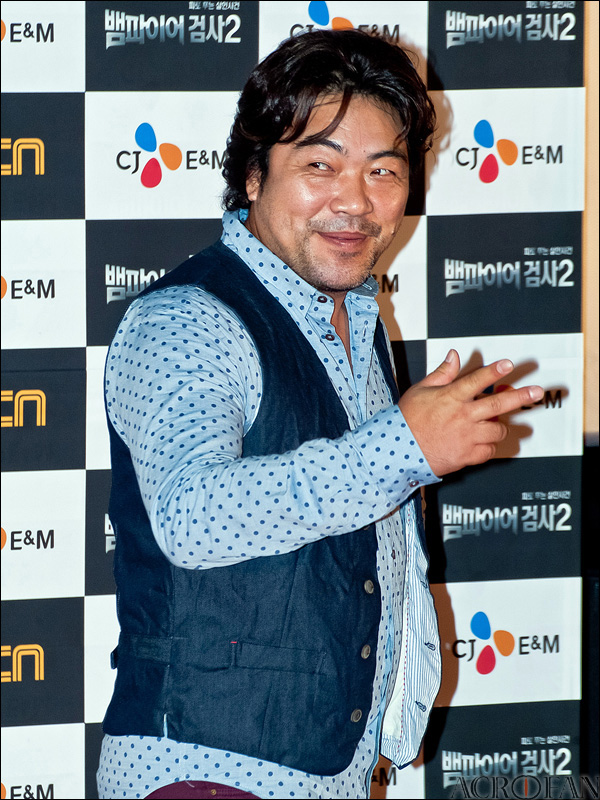
- Lee in September 2012
- Born: January 1, 1966 (age 60); Buyeo County, South Chungcheong, South Korea
- Education: Kyonggi University - Public Administration
- Occupation: Actor
- Years active: 1992–present
- Agent: Allround Entertainment

Korean name
- Hangul: 이원종
- RR: I Wonjong
- MR: I Wŏnjong

Lee Won-jong (Korean: 이원종; born January 1, 1966) is a South Korean actor.

== Filmography ==
=== Film ===
| Year | Film | Role | Notes/Ref. |
|---|---|---|---|
| 1998 | Two Cops 3 | | |
| 1999 | Nowhere to Hide | Detective Park | |
| 1999 | Attack the Gas Station | Policeman | |
| 2000 | The Foul King | Oh Dae-San | |
| 2001 | Kick the Moon | Chun-Soo | |
| 2001 | Hi! Dharma! | Monk Hyeon-Gak | |
| 2002 | Fun Movie | | |
| 2002 | Four Toes | Hae-Tae | |
| 2002 | Break Out | | cameo |
| 2002 | Birth of a Man | | |
| 2002 | Baby Alone | Pung-Ho | |
| 2003 | A Man Who Went to Mars | | cameo |
| 2003 | Oh! Brothers | Mr. Hong | cameo |
| 2003 | My Wife Is a Gangster 2 | Yeo Sa-Rang | cameo |
| 2003 | Once Upon a Time in a Battlefield | Yeon Kae So Moon | cameo |
| 2004 | Hi! Dharma 2: Showdown in Seoul | Monk Hyeon-gak | |
| 2004 | Lovely Rivals | Traffic Police Officer | cameo |
| 2005 | Friendly and Harmonious | Hwa Ki Ae Ae | |
| 2006 | Oh! My God | Doo-Sik | cameo |
| 2006 | Dasepo Naughty Girls | Big Razor Sis | |
| 2006 | 200 Pounds Beauty | Fortune Teller | cameo |
| 2007 | Herb | Police Officer Jang | |
| 2007 | Small Town Rivals | Protester | cameo |
| 2007 | Bunt | President of Real Estate Company | cameo |
| 2008 | Frivolous Wife | Yeon-Soo's Father | |
| 2008 | The Accidental Gangster and the Mistaken Courtesan | Chil-Gab | |
| 2009 | Marine Boy | Detective Kim Gae-Ko | |
| 2009 | The Weird Missing Case of Mr. J | Ma Dong-Po | cameo |
| 2009 | Sky and Sea | CEO | cameo |
| 2010 | Petty Romance | Lee Se-Young | cameo |
| 2011 | Battlefield Heroes | Yeon Gae So Moon | |
| 2011 | I Am a Dad | Organ Trafficking Doctor | cameo |
| 2012 | Pink | Kyeong-Soo | |
| 2012 | Miss Conspirator | Soo-Ro's Psychiatrist | |
| 2013 | How to Use Guys with Secret Tips | Director Yook Bong-Ah | |
| 2014 | Mr. Perfect | Jong-Hee's Father | |
| 2015 | Hot Service: A Cruel Hairdresser | | |
| 2016 | Operation Chromite | Kim Il Sung | Special appearance |
| 2017 | Missing 2 | Song-heon | |
| 2017 | The Age of Blood | Man-seok | |
| 2022 | Transaction Complete | Shinsa | |
| 2024 | Land of Happiness | Jeong Jin-hoo | |

=== Television series ===
| Year | Title | Hangul | Role | Notes/Ref. |
|---|---|---|---|---|
| 1991 | School of Love | | | |
| 1996 | Tears of the Dragon | 용의 눈물 | | |
| 1998 | Legendary Ambition | | | |
| 1998 | The King and the Queen | 왕과 비 | | |
| 1999 | The Clinic for Married Couples: Love and War | 부부클리닉: 사랑과 전쟁 | | |
| 2002 | Rustic Period | 야인시대 | | |
| 2003 | Go Mom Go! | | | |
| 2003 | Bodyguard | 보디가드 | Bang Man-bok | |
| 2003 | My Mother | 달려라 울엄마 | Ko Won-jong | |
| 2004 | Toji, the Land | 토지 | | |
| 2004–2005 | Emperor of the Sea | 해신 | Choi Moo-chang | |
| 2005 | Hanoi Bride | 하노이 신부 | Park Suk-woo | |
| 2006 | Love and Ambition | | | |
| 2006 | Sharp 3 | 성장드라마 반올림 3 | | |
| 2006 | Bad Story | 나쁜소설 | | HDTV Literature |
| 2007 | War of Money | 쩐의 전쟁 | Ma Dong-po | |
| 2008 | The Great King, Sejong | 대왕세종 | Yun Hee | |
| 2008 | Iljimae | 일지매 | Byeon-sik | |
| 2008 | Gourmet | 식객 | Dal-pyung | |
| 2008 | Demon's Story | 전설의 고향 | Angel of Death | Hometown Legends |
| 2008 | Detective Mr. Lee | | | |
| 2009 | Ja Myung Go | 자명고 | Cha Cha-soong | |
| 2009 | Partner | 파트너 | Kim Yong-su | |
| 2009 | Hot Blood | 열혈장사꾼 | | Mae-wang |
| 2010 | The Slave Hunters | | | cameo |
| 2010 | Becoming a Billionaire | 부자의 탄생 | Suk-bong's Math Teacher | cameo |
| 2010 | A Man Called God | 신이라 불리운 사나이 | Park Hong-choon | |
| 2010 | The Scary One, the Ghost and I | | | KBS Drama Special |
| 2010 | Kim Su-ro, The Iron King | 김수로 | Yeom Sa-chi | |
| 2010 | Sungkyunkwan Scandal | 성균관 스캔들 | Shaman Bak-soo | cameo (episode 8) |
| 2010 | Eagle Eagle | | | |
| 2011 | Princess Hwapyung's Weight Loss | | | KBS Drama Special |
| 2011 | Warrior Baek Dong-soo | 무사 백동수 | Hong Dae-joo | |
| 2011 | Scent of a Woman | 여인의 향기 | Pianist Andy Wilson | |
| 2011 | Vampire Prosecutor | 뱀파이어 검사 | Hwang Soon-bom | |
| 2011 | Terminal | | | KBS Drama Special |
| 2012 | Wild Romance | 난폭한 로맨스 | Yoo Young-gil | |
| 2012 | Man from the Equator | 적도의 남자 | Lee Yong-bae | |
| 2012 | Dr. Jin | 닥터진 | Joo-pal | |
| 2012 | Vampire Prosecutor 2 | 뱀파이어 검사 2 | Hwang Soon-bom | |
| 2013 | The Fugitive of Joseon | 천명: 조선판 도망자 이야기 | Geo-chil | |
| 2013 | The Blade and Petal | 칼과 꽃 | Jang-po | |
| 2013 | Unemployed Romance | 실업급여 로맨스 | Insurance Company Employee | cameo (episode 3) |
| 2013 | Empress Ki | 기황후 | Dok-man | |
| 2014 | Secret Door | 비밀의 문 | Bak Mun-su | |
| 2014 | Birth of a Beauty | 미녀의 탄생 | Taxi Driver | cameo |
| 2015 | The Wind Blows to the Hope | | | KBS Drama Special |
| 2015 | The Man in the Mask | 복면검사 | Ji Dong-chan | |
| 2015 | A Girl Who Sees Smells | 냄새를 보는 소녀 | Kang Hyuk | |
| 2015 | Cheo Yong 2 | 처용 2 | Homeless Man | cameo |
| 2015 | Hidden Identity | 신분을 숨겨라 | Choi Tae-pyeong | |
| 2015–2016 | Remember | 리멤버 – 아들의 전쟁 | Suk Joo-il | |
| 2016 | Babysitter | 베이비시터 | Sang-won's Father | |
| 2016 | Goodbye Mr. Black | 굿바이 미스터 블랙 | Go Sung-min | |
| 2016 | Monster | 몬스터 | Na Do-kwang (guest appearance) | |
| 2016 | Uncontrollably Fond | 함부로 애틋하게 | No Jang-soo (No Eul's Father) | |
| 2016 | Pied Piper | 피리부는 사나이 | Lee Chul-yong | |
| 2016 | Dear My Friends | 디어 마이 프렌즈 | Jang Ho-jin | |
| 2017 | Naked Fireman | 맨몸의 소방관 | Jang Gwang-ho | |
| 2018 | Radio Romance | 라디오 로맨스 | Kang Hee-seok | |
| 2018 | Ms. Hammurabi | 미스 함무라비 | Bae Gong-dae | |
| 2018 | Hide and Seek | 숨바꼭질 | Jo Pil-doo | |
| 2018 | The Guest | 손: The Guest | | |
| 2019 | Special Labor Inspector | 특별근로감독관 조장풍 | Ha Ji-man | |
| 2019 | Possessed | 빙의 | Detective Squad Chief Yoo | |
| 2019 | The Great Show | 위대한 쇼 | Jung Jong-chul | |
| 2020 | Lie After Lie | 거짓말의 거짓말 | Yoon Sang-gyu | |
| 2020 | Delayed Justice | 날아라 개천용 | Han Sang-man | |
| 2022 | Money Heist: Korea – Joint Economic Area | 종이의 집 | Moscow | |
| 2022 | Becoming Witch | 마녀는 살아있다 | Natural Person on TV | |
| 2023 | The Bait | 미끼 | | |
| 2023 | Korea–Khitan War | 고려 거란 전쟁 | Gang Jo | |

=== Variety shows ===
| Year | Title | Hangul | Notes/Ref. |
|---|---|---|---|
| 2013-2014 | Beating Hearts | 심장이 뛴다 (텔레비전 프로그램) | |
| 2016 | Actor School | | |
| 2024 | Welcome to Bullo Village | 웰컴투 불로촌 | |

== Theater ==
- Blind (2010)
- The Masked Hut Murder Case (2022) - Nobuhiko

== Awards ==
- 2002 SBS Drama Awards: Best Supporting Actor (Rustic Period)
- 2006 KBS Drama Awards: Best Actor in a One Act Drama/Special (Bad Story)
- 2007 SBS Drama Awards: Best Supporting Actor in a Miniseries (War of Money)
- 2008 KBS Drama Awards: Excellence Award, Actor in a Weekly Drama (The Great King, Sejong)
- 2023 KBS Drama Awards: Best Supporting Actor (Korea–Khitan War)
