= The Worst of Evil =

2023 South Korean television series

- Promotional poster
- Hangul: 최악의 악
- Hanja: 最惡의 惡
- Lit.: Worst Evil
- RR: Choeagui ak
- MR: Ch'oeagŭi ak
- Genre: Crime action; Thriller; Noir
- Created by: Kakao Entertainment
- Written by: Jang Min-suk
- Directed by: Han Dong-wook
- Starring: Ji Chang-wook; Wi Ha-joon; Im Se-mi
- Music by: Hwang Sang-joon
- Country of origin: South Korea
- Original language: Korean
- No. of episodes: 12

Production
- Executive producer: Gang-in
- Producers: Jang Se-jeong; Park Ho-sik; Han Jae-deok; Joo Jae-sang
- Running time: 52–69 minutes
- Production companies: Baram Pictures; Sanai Pictures

Original release
- Network: Disney+
- Release: September 27 – October 25, 2023

The Worst of Evil (Korean: 최악의 악) is a 2023 South Korean crime action thriller noir television series starring Ji Chang-wook, Wi Ha-joon, and Im Se-mi. It was released on Disney+ on September 27, 2023, at 16:00 (KST).

== Plot ==
Set in the 1990s, The Worst of Evil follows undercover police investigators who infiltrate a massive criminal organization responsible for the illegal drug trade between Korea, China and Japan. Park Jun-mo is a senior police officer and homicide detective in the countryside who is constantly belittled by the in-laws for having a lower rank and career prestige than his wife, Yoo Eui-jeong, an elite member of the Security Division of the Seoul Metropolitan police. Despite this, his wife always stands up for him. Sick of being emasculated by his job, he accepts a deal as an undercover cop in the Gangnam organization so he can get a promotion that matches his wife's prestige.

Meanwhile, Jung Gi-cheul, a DJ of a nightclub controlled by the mob called the Gangnam Union, is invited by the boss of the nightclub, Jang Kyung-chul to be his enforcer due to his ability to handle unruly customers. Eventually, Gi-cheul rises up in rank and becomes the manager of the nightclub. After being unable to handle a group of rich and highly influential customers, he suggests to Jang the idea of selling drugs to increase their profits and gain power over influential clients. In response, Jang slams a bucket of water in Gi-cheul's face, rebuffing the suggestion as he does not want to endanger his business by getting involved in narcotics. Having had enough with Jang, Gi-cheul and his friends orchestrate the assassination of both Jang and his followers. However, Gi-cheul's close friend Kwon Tae-ho is killed in the conflict. After the attack, Gi-cheul meets with Song Dong-hyuk, the mob's 'big boss', to gain his blessing to take over the Gangnam territory and promises him 50 million won in profit every month if he allows the trading of narcotics. Song accepts, and Gi-cheul becomes the boss of the Gangnam territory and the drug trade in it.

== Cast ==
=== Main ===
- Ji Chang-wook as Park Jun-mo / Kwon Seung-ho

A senior patrol officer from a countryside police station who was constantly belittled by the in-laws for having lower rank than his wife. He was ordered to infiltrate Gangnam Union, with the promise of promotion and huge bonus which he accepts as he is tired of being looked down. He uses the name Kwon Seung-ho, a fake cousin of the dead Tae-ho, while in Gangnam Union.

- Wi Ha-joon as Jung Gi-cheul
  - Seo Jun as young Jung Gi-cheul

A former DJ and mob enforcer turned leader of Gangnam Union, the key organization and monopoly of the drug trade, after killing his boss.

- Im Se-mi as Yoo Eui-jeong
  - Shin So-hyun as young Yoo Eui-jeong

Jun-mo's wife who is an elite officer in the security division of the Seoul Metropolitan Police Agency. She is also Gi-cheul's first love during high school.

=== Supporting ===
==== Gangnam Union ====
- Lee Shin-ki as Seo Jong-ryeol

A mid-level executive of Gangnam Union. He is a professional killer who wields his knife, assisting Gi-cheul with his brutal skills.

- Jung Jae-kwang as Kwon Tae-ho

Gi-cheul's best friend who was fatally stabbed to death during an attack on Kyung-chul and his men.

- Lim Seong-jae as Choi Jeong-bae

A member of Gangnam Union, and partners with Gi-cheul. He has sharp observation skills, and is rational with strategy to settle issues.

- Cha Rae-hyung as Hong Hee-seong

A member of Gangnam Union. He has a girlfriend who had given birth to a boy.

- Bae Myung-jin as Bae Yong-dae

The youngest member of Gangnam Union. He partners Seung-ho in surveilling the Gangnam district.

==== Gangnam Police Station ====
- Ji Seung-hyun as Seok Do-hyung

The chief detective of the anti-narcotics department. He has been acquaintances with Jun-mo since his high school days, and he was the one who recommended Jun-mo to infiltrate the Gangnam Union.

- Yoon Kyung-ho as Hwang Min-goo

A shady homicide detective from Gangnam Police Station.

- Kim Beom-soo as Detective Go

A homicide detective from Gangnam Police Station, and Min-goo's partner.

==== Others ====
- Kim Hyeong-seo as Lee Hae-ryeon

A Korean-Chinese drug distributor for Dongmu Gang from Changchun. She came to Korea to trade with Gi-cheul.

- Jung Man-sik as Jang Kyung-chul

The leader of another Gangnam organization.

- Lee Jeong-heon as Cho Chang-sik

The chief prosecutor of the Seoul District Prosecutors' Office.

- Dokgo Young-jae as Song Dong-hyuk

The chief of a Busan gang, and the boss of Kyung-chul.

- Ye Soo-jung as Yoon Won-gil

A drug manufacturer, with the nickname Professor Yoon.

- Park Sang-hoon as Sung Ki-soo

The leader of Jaegeon Gang.

- Woo Kang-min as Bok-nam

The vice leader of Jaegeon Gang.

- Gyeol Hwi as Cheol-gon

A member of Jaegeon Gang. He has intended to take advantage of Gi-cheul.

- Keum Kwang-san as Baby

The operations leader of an organization opposite of Gangnam Union.

== Production ==
Principal photography began on August 24, 2022, and wrapped up on April 28, 2023.

== Accolades ==
Name of the award ceremony, year presented, category, nominee of the award, and the result of the nomination
Award ceremony	Year	Category	Nominee / Work	Result	Ref.
Asia Contents Awards & Global OTT Awards	2024	Best Supporting Actress	Kim Hyeong-seo	Nominated	
Baeksang Arts Awards	2024	Best Director	Han Dong-wook	Won	
Baeksang Arts Awards	2024	Best New Actor	Lee Shin-ki	Nominated	
Baeksang Arts Awards	2024	Best New Actress	Kim Hyeong-seo	Nominated	
