= Lee Eung-kyung =

South Korean actress (born 1966)

Lee Eung-Kyeong
- Born: February 3, 1966 (age 60); Seoul, South Korea
- Education: Inha Technical College - Airline Service Management
- Occupation: Actress
- Years active: 1987–present
- Agent(s): T&I Cultures
- Spouses: Choi Gap-soo (m. 1987; div. 2000) Lee Jin-woo (m. 2005)

Korean name
- Hangul: 이응경
- Hanja: 李應敬
- RR: I Eunggyeong
- MR: I Ŭnggyŏng

Lee Eung-kyung (Korean: 이응경; born February 3, 1966) is a South Korean actress. She began her acting career in 1987, and has since appeared in films and television dramas such as Palace of Dreams and Aeja's Older Sister, Minja.

== Filmography ==
=== Film ===
Year	Title	Role
1988	Lee Jang-ho's Alien Baseball Team 2	Eom-ji
1989	My Love, Don Quixote	Je-ha
1989	25 Dollar People	
1990	Man Market	Jae-hee
1990	A Crazy Love Song	Mi-jung
1994	The Young Man	Cha Seung-hye
1996	The Day a Pig Fell into the Well	Bo-kyung
1996	Grown-ups Grill the Herring	Seo Woon-young
1997	He Asked Me If I Knew Zither	Hae-sook
2001	My Wife Is a Gangster	Yu-jin
2004	100 Days with Mr. Arrogant	Kang Ha-yeong's mother
2004	Bunshinsaba	(cameo)
2004	Don't Tell Papa	Elena Kim
2005	Jenny, Juno	Juno's mother
2017	My Little Baby, Jaya	

=== Television series ===
Year	Title	Role	Notes/Ref.
1988	Golden Tower		
1988	The Winter That Year Was Warm	Soo-in	
1989	2nd Republic	Shin Jae-soon	
1990	That Woman		
1991	Another Happiness		
1991	Dictionary of Happiness	Cha Sung-hee	
1991	Dongui Bogam (Mirror of Eastern Medicine)	Da-hee	
1991	Windmills of Love		
1992	Blue Thread Red Thread		
1992	Jealousy	Han Young-ae	
1992	No One Loves Anymore	Lee Hye-in	
1992	Ambitions on Sand	Sung-joo	
1993	I Have To Rise Up		
1993	I'm No Angel	Se-hwa	
1994	Han Myung-hoi	Han Myung-hoi's concubine	
1994	The Lonely Man	Jae-hee	
1994	Close One Eye		
1996	Lady Chunhyang, Newcomer to Hanyang		
1996	Lover	Lee Myung-ae	
1996	MBC Best Theater: "Me, 28 Years Old and Unmarried"		
1997	Palace of Dreams		
1997	Lady	Lady	
1998	Seoul Tango		
1998	Dying Young		
1999	Cello	Jung Myung-hee	
1999	Magic Castle	Mrs. Han	
2000	The Full Sun	Jang Moon-hee	
2000	I Want to Keep Seeing You	Oh Dong-hee	
2001	I Want to See Your Face	Seo Ji-hyun/Yoon Soo-kyung	
2002	Days in the Sun	Lee Seung-hye	
2002	Five Brothers and Sisters	Seo In-soon	
2002	Confession	Lee Jung-hee	
2002	Honest Living	Lee Eung-kyung	
2003	Merry Go Round	Yoo Myung-ja	
2003	Sharp 1	Kim Sung-hee	
2004	KBS TV Novel: "You Are a Star"	Hwang Ae-shim	
2004	Magic	Kim Mi-jung	
2004	Stained Glass	Cha Jin-joo	
2005	Sharp 2	Kim Sung-hee	
2006	I Want to Love	Woo Yeo-jin	
2007	My Mom! Super Mom!	Kim Young-ja	
2007	Belle	Chun Mi-ja	
2007	New Heart	Kim Hye-sook	
2008	Aeja's Older Sister, Minja	Joo Ae-ja	
2008	Wife and Woman	Park Yeon-ha	
2009	Jolly Widows	Na Eun-hye	
2010	Pure Pumpkin Flower	Se-mi	
2011	Oh My God	Lee Eung-kyung	
2012	Operation Proposal	Oh Jung-rim	
2012	Tasty Life	Jo Hye-ran	
2012	I Do, I Do	Doctor	
2013	You Are the Best!	Yoon Soo-jung	
2013	Nine	Kim Yoo-jin (2012)	
2013	Empress Ki	Court lady Noh	
2014	Angel's Revenge	Na Dal-nyeo	
2014	A Witch's Love	Baek Soo-jeong	Cameo (episode 1–2)
2014	Only Love	Lee Young-ran	
2015	Love on a Rooftop	Yang Mi-ja	
2015	Tomorrow Victory	Kong Cho-hee	
2016	I'm Sorry, But I Love You	Jung Sook-ja	
2017	Lovers in Bloom	Oh Kyeong-ah / Oh Choon-rae	
2017	Our Sturdy Neighborhood		
2017	Reverse		
2018	Love to the End	Seo Mi-soon	
2023	My Gold, My Jade	Hwang Chan-ran	

== Awards and nominations ==
Year	Award	Category	Nominated work	Result
1997	33rd Baeksang Arts Awards	Most Popular Actress (TV)	Palace of Dreams	Won
2009	KBS Drama Awards	Excellence Award, Actress in a Daily Drama	Jolly Widows	Nominated
