= R2B: Return to Base =

- Promotional poster for R2B: Return to Base
- Hangul: 알투비: 리턴투베이스
- RR: Altubi: riteon tu beiseu
- MR: Alt'ubi: rit'ŏn t'u peisŭ
- Directed by: Kim Dong-won
- Written by: Kim Dong-won
- Produced by: Jang Tae-gon; Kim Dong-won
- Starring: Rain; Shin Se-kyung; Yoo Jun-sang; Lee Ha-na
- Cinematography: Kim Hyo-jin
- Edited by: Shin Min-kyung
- Music by: Lee Jae-hak
- Production companies: Red Muffler; CJ Entertainment; Zoomoney Entertainment
- Distributed by: CJ Entertainment (international)
- Release date: 15 August 2012
- Running time: 113 minutes
- Country: South Korea
- Language: Korean
- Budget: US$8 million
- Box office: US$7.3 million

R2B: Return to Base (Korean: 알투비: 리턴투베이스) is a 2012 South Korean aviation action drama film loosely based on the 1986 film Top Gun. The film stars Rain, Shin Se-kyung and Yoo Jun-sang in lead roles. It was directed by Kim Dong-won and is also a remake of Shin Sang-ok's 1964 film Red Scarf. It is about a talented, yet troublemaking, elite air force pilot who is demoted to a combat flying unit. It was released on 15 August 2012. The Republic of Korea Air Force was heavily involved in the film's production.

The film was the final acting project for Rain, before he enlisted to serve his mandatory military service in October after filming wrapped in September 2011.

The film is also known under the alternate titles Black Eagle and Soar Into the Sun.

== Plot ==
Captain Jung Tae-yoon (Rain), a Republic of Korea Air Force pilot in the Black Eagles aerobatic team, performs a cocky and dangerous maneuver during an air show and is promptly transferred to the 21st Fighter Wing, a combat unit flying the F-15K strike fighter, led by Brigadier General Choi Byeong-gil (Jo Sung-ha) and Major Park Dae-suh (Kim Sung-soo). There he meets Cheol-hee (Yoo Jun-sang), the unit's own elite pilot. The two quickly come into friction, as Tae-yoon is free-spirited while Cheol-hee is by-the-book.

When a Korean People's Air Force MiG-29 crosses the Korean Demilitarized Zone in an attempt to defect, the 21st sorties to escort it. Suddenly, a second KPAF MiG-29 intercepts the escort, shoots the defector down, and flies toward Seoul. The 21st attempts to engage, but is told that the rules of engagement prohibit engagements over populated areas and is forced to allow it to attack Seoul, causing catastrophic destruction and numerous casualties. Tae-yoon and Dae-suh pursue the MiG as it returns to North Korean airspace, but it attacks and cripples Dae-suh's plane. Noticing civilians below, Dae-suh ejects Ji Seok-hyun, his weapon systems officer, to safety and maneuvers his plane out of the civilians' way, but his ejection seat fails and he crashes into a mountain, killing him. Still unable to engage the MiG, Tae-yoon is forced to turn back, allowing it to escape.

Back at the airbase, the 21st is informed that a North Korean battalion led by General Kang Sang Yeol has gone rogue, seizing a nuclear silo with the intent of firing a ballistic missile at the United States. An American officer with United States Forces Korea informs the ROKAF that they have prepared a B-2 Spirit for a preemptive strike, which would reignite the Korean conflict. Because the U.S. refuses to rescue Seok-hyun, the ROKAF and the Ministry of National Defense secretly launch their own rescue mission, assigning only a T-50 and an F-15K to avoid attention. When the U.S learned of the Operations, they ordered the ROKAF and the Ministry of National Defense to ask their troops to stand down but they rejected.

The mission is launched, and Seok-hyun is rescued by South Korean pararescue troops. After destroying the rogue battalion's base, the 21st is confronted by the MiG-29 from earlier, and they battle. During the dogfight, the MiG-29 stalls, allowing Tae-yoon to shoot it down. The T-50 is lost while trying to evade a SAM, but the pilot survives. The mission is a success, and the B-2 strike is called off. At the end, Tae-yoon gives his respects to his fallen comrade.

== Cast ==
- Rain - Captain Jung Tae-yoon, a former Black Eagles pilot who is reassigned to the 21st Fighter Wing as an F-15K pilot
- Shin Se-kyung - Technical Sergeant Yoo Se-young, a 21st Fighter Wing mechanic and Tae-Yoon's love interest
- Yoo Jun-sang - Major Lee Cheol-hee, an elite pilot of the 21st
- Lee Ha-na - Captain Oh Yoo-jin, Tae-yoon's air force academy classmate and Cheol-hee's weapon systems officer
- Kim Sung-soo - Major Park Dae-suh, Tae-yoon's academy senior and flight leader of the 21st
- Lee Jong-suk - First Lieutenant Ji Seok-hyun, rookie pilot and Tae-yoon's weapon systems officer
- Jung Kyung-ho - Captain Jo Tae-bong, a pilot
- Jung Suk-won - Technical Sergeant Choi Min-ho, a special forces soldier part of the rescue team
- Jo Sung-ha - Brigadier General Choi Byeong-gil, the 21st's commander
- Oh Dal-su - Master Sergeant Min Dong-phil, the 21st's maintenance crew chief

== International release ==
Before the film's release it was reported to have sold to 30 countries including Thailand, Taiwan, India, Indonesia, Malaysia, and other parts of Asia as well as the United Kingdom, France, Germany and Italy. It also screened in 13 cities across North America premiering in Los Angeles on 24 August and continuing in San Diego, Seattle, Dallas, Atlanta, Washington D.C., Philadelphia, New Jersey, New York, Honolulu, Toronto and Vancouver in Canada; closing in Chicago on 31 August.
