= Frivolous Wife =

- Hangul: 날나리 종부전
- RR: Nallari jongbujeon
- MR: Nallari chongbujŏn
- Directed by: Lim Won-kook
- Written by: Park Yeon-seon
- Starring: Park Jung-ah; Park Jin-woo
- Distributed by: Lotte Entertainment
- Release date: May 22, 2008
- Running time: 110 minutes
- Country: South Korea
- Language: Korean
- Box office: US$160,719

Frivolous Wife is a 2008 South Korean romantic comedy film based on William Shakespeare's The Taming of the Shrew.

== Plot ==
Cheon Yeon-soo is a beautiful, hot-headed college girl whose family became millionaires overnight. She was raised by an over-indulgent father and grew up spoiled. Yeon-soo is used to getting any man she wants, but she falls in love with her polar opposite: awkward and polite Lee Jeong-do. Jeong-do is the only grandson of a very traditional family, and Yeon-soo attempts to transform herself into a proper lady so that her future in-laws will accept her. Little does she know that Jeong-do's family actually heads a notorious mob.

== Cast ==
- Park Jung-ah as Cheon Yeon-soo
- Park Jin-woo as Lee Jeong-do
- Jang Min-ho as Grandfather
- Lee Won-jong as Yeon-soo's father
- Jo Sang-gook as Head of the family
- Yang Geum-seok as Aunt-in-law
- Lee Il-hwa as Aunt-in-law
- Lee Il-jae as Na Dae-jin
- Lee Sang-hoon as In-seok
- Kim Tae-ho as Bong-doo
- Son Ji-won as Ji-won
- Choi Yoon-jung as Tyrannical teacher
- Choi Jae-ho as Hypnotist
- Kim Hyeon-ki
- Kim Jong-seok
- Kim Neul-mae
