= My Boss, My Teacher =

- Theatrical poster
- Hangul: 투사부일체
- Hanja: 투師父一體
- RR: Tusabuilche
- MR: T'usabuilch'e
- Directed by: Kim Dong-won
- Written by: Kang Seok-beom; Kim Dong-won; Lee Yun-jin
- Produced by: Kim Du-chan
- Starring: Jung Joon-ho; Jung Woong-in
- Cinematography: Lee Hu-gon
- Edited by: Cho Jae-geun; Jeong Gwang-jin; Eom Jin-ha
- Music by: Kim Si-hwan
- Production company: Cinema Zenith Entertainment
- Distributed by: CJ Entertainment
- Release date: 19 July 2006
- Running time: 124 minutes
- Country: South Korea
- Language: Korean
- Box office: US$30.6 million

My Boss, My Teacher (Korean: 투사부일체) is a 2006 South Korean film and sequel to the 2001 film My Boss, My Hero. It was followed by The Mafia, The Salesman in 2007.

== Plot ==
Gangster Doo-shik has graduated school and is now attending college, though he is allowing his underling Sang-du to take classes on his behalf. For the final semester, all education majors are sent out to work in schools for teacher training. This is one job that Doo-shik must complete himself, and he is sent out to teach in the trouble-laden high school himself.

== Cast ==
- Jung Joon-ho as Gae Doo-shik.
- Jung Woong-in as Sang-du
- Jung Woon-taek as Dae Ga-ri
- Kim Sang-joong as Oh Sang-jung
- Kang Sung-pil
- Lee Soo-hyuk as Student
- Choi Yoon-yeong
- Han Hyo-joo
- Haha

== Release ==
My Boss, My Teacher was released in South Korea on 19 January 2006, and topped the box office on its opening weekend with 1,106,825 admissions. It held the number-one spot for a second consecutive week, and went on to receive a total of 6,105,431 admissions nationwide, making it the fourth best selling film of 2006, and—until surpassed by 200 Pounds Beauty in early 2007—the most successful Korean comedy film of all time. As of 5 February 2006, the film had grossed a total of $30,585,589.
