= Aeja's Older Sister, Minja =

South Korean television series

- Promotional poster
- Also known as: Ae-ja and Min-ja
- Hangul: 애자 언니 민자
- RR: Aeja eonni Minja
- MR: Aeja ŏnni Minja
- Genre: Family; Romance
- Written by: Yoon Jung-gun
- Directed by: Kwak Young-bum
- Starring: Cha Hwa-yeon; Lee Eung-kyung
- Country of origin: South Korea
- Original language: Korean
- No. of episodes: 140

Production
- Production location: South Korea
- Running time: 30 minutes Mondays to Fridays at 19:20 (KST)
- Production companies: Shinyoung E&C Group; Production Yeyeong

Original release
- Network: SBS TV
- Release: April 21 – October 31, 2008

Aeja's Older Sister, Minja (Korean: 애자 언니 민자) is a 2008 South Korean television series starring Cha Hwa-yeon, Lee Eung-kyung, So Yi-hyun and Song Yi-woo. The daily drama aired on SBS from April 21 to October 31, 2008, on Mondays to Fridays at 19:20 (KST) for 140 episodes.

== Cast ==
=== Main ===
- Cha Hwa-yeon as Joo Min-ja
- Lee Eung-kyung as Joo Ae-ja
- So Yi-hyun as Lee Chae-rin, Min-ja's daughter
- Song Yi-woo as Han Se-ah, Ae-ja's daughter

=== Supporting ===
- In Gyo-jin (Note: Credited as Do Yi-sung.) as Park Ha-jin
- Jung Jae-soon as Park Bok-nyeo, Min-ja's mother
- Lee Deok-hwa (Note: Real-life father and daughter Lee Deok-hwa and Lee Ji-hyun both appeared in the series.) as Han Beom-man, Ae-ja's husband
- Lee Kyung-shil as Lee Ki-ja, Min-ja's husband's sister
- Yoo Seung-bong as Go Man-sik, Ki-ja's husband
- Yoon Da-hoon as Lee Dal-geon, Min-ja's husband's younger brother
- Kim Min-hee as Goo Won-ja, Min-ja's sister-in-law
- Lee Ji-woo as Lee Da-rin, Dal-geon's daughter
- Han Jin-hee as Park Jang-hyun, Ha-jin's father
- Ha Mi-hye as Ha Mi-joo, Ha-jin's mother
- Shi On as Park Ji-ae, Ha-jin's younger sister
- Seo Sang-won as Park Dong-jin, Ha-jin's younger brother
- Jo Eun-deok as Choong Joo-daek
- Kim Hyun-jin as Kim Joon-seok, Joo-daek's son
- Im Sung-min as Na Joo-ri
- Lee Ji-hyun as Oh Yang-geum, Chae-rin's friend
- Hong Seok-cheon as Heo Goo-hyung
- Park Ji-yeon as Maeng Na-yeon
- Kim Ha-yoon as Eun-jung
- Kim So-ri as Oh Ji-hyun
- Kim Woo-hyun as Kim Joon-seok
- Jung Ki-sung as Chang-woo
