= Ban Se-jung =

South Korean actress (born 1986)

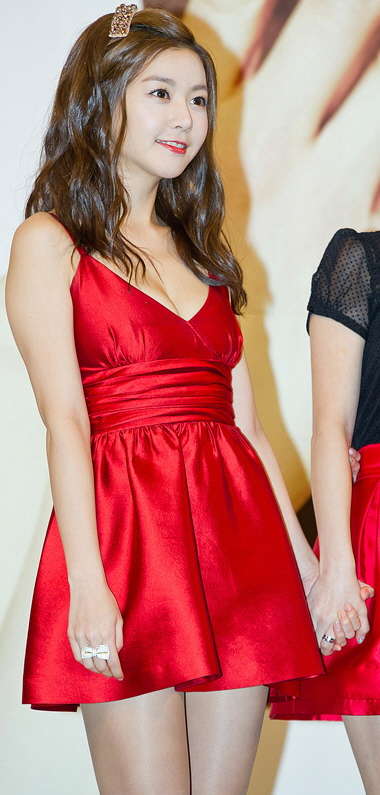
- Ban in 2012
- Born: Kim Se-jung; April 7, 1986 (age 40); South Korea
- Occupation: Actress
- Years active: 2007–present

Korean name
- Hangul: 김세정
- RR: Gim Sejeong
- MR: Kim Sejŏng

Stage name
- Hangul: 반세정
- RR: Ban Sejeong
- MR: Pan Sejŏng

Kim Se-jung (Korean: 김세정; born April 7, 1986), better known by her stage name Ban Se-jung, is a South Korean actress. She is known for her role as Jang Se-ryung on the series Love on a Rooftop.

== Filmography ==
=== Film ===
Year	Title	Role	Note
2007	Incongruity	Jeong-hee	short film
2008	Goose's Dream	Seon-kyung	
2012	The Scent	Soojin 3	
2013	Friend: The Great Legacy	Lovers of Eun-gi	

=== Television ===
Year	Title	Role	Note
2009	Can't Stop Now	Jang So-yeon	
2012	The Wedding Scheme	Yoo Min-jeong	
2014	Inspiring Generation	Sin Chung-ah	
2015	Love on a Rooftop	Jang Se-ryung	
