= Im Se-mi =

South Korean actress (born 1987)

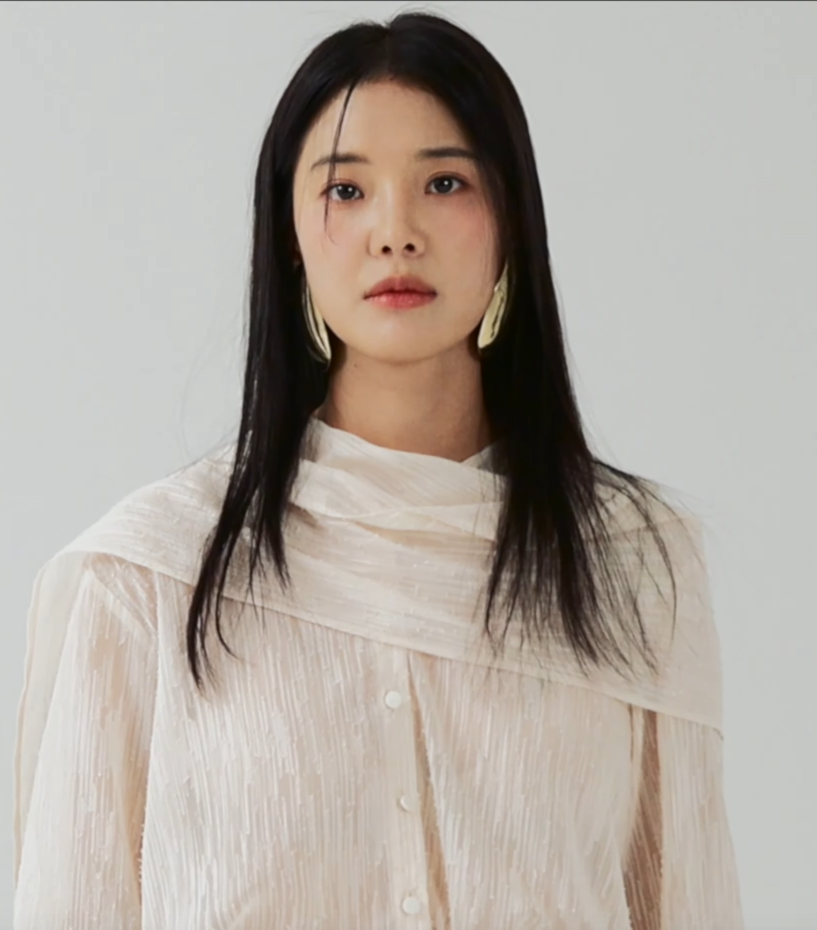
- Im in November 2023
- Born: May 29, 1987 (age 39); Seoul, South Korea
- Education: Dongduk Women's University
- Occupation: Actress
- Years active: 2004–present
- Agent: Noon Company

Korean name
- Hangul: 임세미
- Hanja: 林世美
- RR: Im Semi
- MR: Im Semi

Im Se-mi (Korean: 임세미; born May 29, 1987) is a South Korean actress. She received wider recognition with the web series The Worst of Evil in 2023.

== Career ==
In 2004, Im made her debut as Ssamzie catalog model. In 2006, she made her acting debut with minor role in television drama Sharp 2. In that same year, after graduating from Jinseon Girls' High School, Im enrolled in Departement of Broadcasting Entertainment at Dongduk Women's University.

Im started to get bigger roles after she played the protagonist in two daily soap operas for two consecutive years; Only Love (2014) and Love on a Rooftop (2015).

In January 2019, Im signed with new agency YNK Entertainment.

On February 3, 2022, Im signed an exclusive contract with Noon Company, after her contract with YNK Entertainment has expired.

Im's career has risen steadily after she changed agencies. She was cast in her first miniseries main role with the 2023 crime action web series The Worst of Evil, as a police officer and the wife of the main villain. In 2024, Im portrayed a standout role in another web series The Whirlwind, a political thriller starring acclaimed actors Sul Kyung-gu and Kim Hee-ae.

Im received her first television weekly miniseries leading role in the 2025 SBS sports coming-of-age Try: We Become Miracles.

== Filmography ==
=== Film ===
Year	Title	Role
2007	Highway Star	Chairman Choi's daughter
2019	Money	Ye-ji
2022	Awake	Hyerin
2023	Concerning My Daughter	Geu-rin (the daughter)

=== Television series ===
Year	Title	Role	Notes/Ref.
2005	Sharp 2	Im Se-mi	
2010	Pure Pumpkin Flower	Oh Hyo-sun	
2011	Heartstrings	Cha Bo-woon	
2011	Bravo, My Love!	Kyung-mi	
2013	That Winter, the Wind Blows	Son Mi-ra	
2013	Two Weeks	Oh Mi-sook	
2013	KBS Drama Special	Yoon Ji-wan	Episode: "Yeon-Woo's Summer"
2013	The King's Daughter, Soo Baek-hyang	Queen Eun-hye	
2014	Only Love	Choi Yoo-ri	
2014	Drama Festival	Geum-ji's mother	Episode: "Lump in My Life"
2015	Great Stories: Young-ja's Best Days	Kyung-ah	
2015	Love on a Rooftop	Yoon Seung-hye	
2016	Goodbye Mr. Black	Cha Ji-soo	
2016	Shopping King Louie	Baek Ma-ri	
2017	Ms. Perfect	Jung Na-mi	
2017	Two Cops	Ko Bong-sook	
2018	About Time	Bae Soo-bong	
2018	Mr. Sunshine	Dong mae's mother	Cameo, Episode 3
2018	My Secret Terrius	Yoo Ji-yeon	
2020	When the Weather Is Fine	Kim Bo-young	
2020–21	True Beauty	Im Hee-kyeong	
2022	Desperate Mr. X	Mi-jin	
2022	The Empire	Yoon Eun-mi	
2023	Duty After School	Park Eun-young	Part 1
2023	The Worst of Evil	Yoo Eui-jung	
2024	Wonderful World	Han Yoo-ri	
2024	The Whirlwind	Seo Jeong-yeon	
2025	My Dearest Nemesis	Seo Ha-jin	
2025	The Winning Try	Bae Yi-ji	

=== Variety show ===
Year	Title	Notes/Ref.
2017	King of Mask Singer	Contestant as "Hula Girl" (ep.119)

== Theater ==
List of stage play(s)
Year	Title		Role	Theater	Date	Ref.
Year	English	Korean	Role	Theater	Date	Ref.
2012	Thief's Diary	도둑놈 다이어리	Ma Hee-jin	Sky Theatre 2 (formerly JK Art Hall)	September 12 to December 31	
2013–2014	Thursday Romance	그와 그녀의 목요일	Jung Yeon-ok (young)	Daehakro Cultural Space Feeling 1	November 29 to January 19	
2014	Thursday Romance	그와 그녀의 목요일	Jung Yeon-ok (young)	Suhyeon Theater (DCF Daemyung) Culture Factory 3F	March 1 to May 11	
2021	Perfetti Sconosciuti	완벽한 타인	Bianca	Sejong Centre for the Performing Arts M Theatre	May 18 to Aug 1	
2021	Perfetti Sconosciuti	완벽한 타인	Bianca	GS Caltex Yeulmaru Grand Theatre, Yeosu	August 13 to 14	
2024	Flower, Stars Passing By	꽃, 별이 지나	Ji-won	Seokyung University Performing Arts Center SKON1 Hall	June 8, 2024 – August 18, 2024	

== Awards and nominations ==
Year	Award	Category	Nominated work	Result
2015	29th KBS Drama Awards	Excellence Award, Actress in a Daily Drama	Love on a Rooftop	Nominated
2016	35th MBC Drama Awards	Golden Acting Award, Actress in a Miniseries	Shopping King Louie	Won
2017	36th MBC Drama Awards	Excellence Award, Actress in a Monday-Tuesday Drama	Two Cops	Nominated
2018	37th MBC Drama Awards	Excellence Award, Actress in a Wednesday-Thursday Miniseries	My Secret Terrius	Nominated
2024	43rd MBC Drama Awards	Excellence Award, Actress in a Miniseries	Wonderful World	Nominated
