= Sungkyul University =

University in Anyang, South Korea

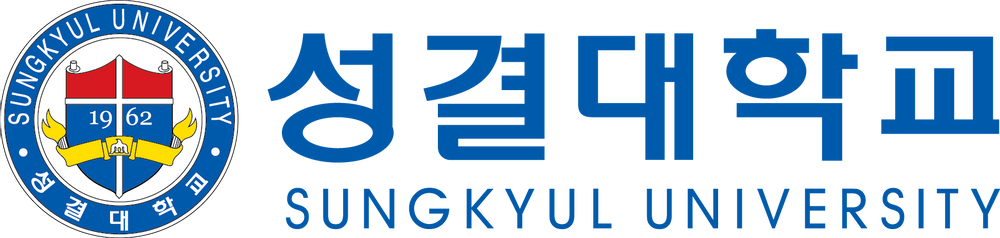
- Type: Private
- Established: September 20, 1962
- Religious affiliation: Korean Holiness Church of Jesus
- President: Kim Sang-sik
- Academic staff: 201 (2017)
- Students: 4,973 (2017)
- Location: 37.3793°N 126.9292°E
- Website: www.sungkyul.ac.kr/skueng/index.do

Korean name
- Hangul: 성결대학교
- Hanja: 聖潔大學校
- RR: Seonggyeol daehakgyo
- MR: Sŏnggyŏl taehakkyo

Sungkyul University (SKU; Korean: 성결대학교) is a private Protestant university in Anyang, South Korea. As of 2021, it operates a total of 30 departments under seven colleges. It is a member of the Korean Council for University Education.

== History ==
On September 20, 1962, Pastor Kim Eung-jo founded the Sungkyul Theological Seminary, which was operated by the Korean Holiness Church of Jesus. It was originally located in Seodaemun District of Seoul, but moved to the Jongno District in November of the following year. In 1966, it was given the status of a four year university. In 1975, it moved to its current location in Anyang, becoming the first general university in the city.

== Notable alumni ==
- Wi Ha-joon, South Korean actor
