= My Little Baby, Jaya =

- Theatrical poster
- Hangul: 지렁이
- Lit.: Earthworm
- RR: Jireongi
- MR: Chirŏngi
- Directed by: Yoon Hak-ryul
- Screenplay by: Kim Yeon-ho; Yoon Hak-ryul
- Produced by: Lee Hyang-cheol
- Release date: April 20, 2017 (South Korea)
- Running time: 102 minutes
- Country: South Korea
- Language: Korean

My Little Baby, Jaya (Korean: 지렁이; lit. 'Earthworm') is a 2017 South Korean drama film directed by Yoon Hak-ryul.

== Plot ==
The story of a 45-year-old man with cerebral palsy whose life is completely shattered when his teenage daughter, a victim of escalating school bullying and sexual violence, commits suicide. Feeling helpless and further let down by society, he decides to take extreme measures to express his grievances.

In the end, he disfigures the girls that bullied his daughter by disfiguring them with acid and murders the boys that gang raped her. However, he then commits suicide as he has nothing left to live for.

== Cast ==
- Kim Jeong-kyoon as Won-sool
- Oh Ye-seol as Jaya
- Hwang Do-won as Min-kyeong
- Kim Saet-byeol as Hye-seon
- Lee Cheol-hee as Yoo-jeong
- Park Se-ah as Bo-ra
- Yoon Ra-yeong as Soon-yeong
- Jung Ooi-cheol as Tae-seong
- Kim Jong-won as Hwi-ram
- Kim Jeong-yoon as Seung-woo
- Yang Hye-kyeong as In-mi
- Lee Ah-yoon as Ye-cheon
- Kim Tae-rin as Yoo-jin
- Kim Sam-han as Mr. Kim
- Song Yoon as Hyeong-soo
- Kim Ji-hong as Convenience store boss
- Yoon Soon-hong as Principal
- Lee Kye-in (special appearance)
- Lee Han-wi (special appearance)
- Jeong Oon-taek (special appearance)
- Kwon Yeong-chan (special appearance)
- Choi Cheol-ho (special appearance)
- Lee Eung-kyung (special appearance)
- Oh Sol-mi (special appearance)
- Park No-shik (special appearance)
- Kim Kwang-sik (special appearance)
- Myeong Seung-kwon (special appearance)

== Awards and nominations ==
Award	Category	Recipient	Result
54th Grand Bell Awards	Best New Actress	Oh Ye-seol	Nominated
