= Midnight (2021 film) =

2021 South Korean thriller film

- Official release poster
- Hangul: 미드나이트
- RR: Mideunaiteu
- MR: Midŭnait'ŭ
- Directed by: Kwon Oh-seung
- Written by: Kwon Oh-seung
- Produced by: Kim Hyun-woo
- Starring: Jin Ki-joo; Wi Ha-joon; Park Hoon; Gil Hae-yeon; Kim Hye-yoon
- Cinematography: Cha Taek-gyun
- Edited by: Lee Gang-hui
- Music by: Hwang Sang-jun
- Production companies: Peppermint & Company; CJ ENM
- Distributed by: CJ Entertainment; TVING
- Release date: June 30, 2021
- Running time: 103 minutes
- Country: South Korea
- Languages: Korean; Korean Sign Language
- Box office: US$814,018

Midnight (Korean: 미드나이트; RR: Mideunaiteu) is a 2021 South Korean psychological thriller film, written and directed by Kwon Oh-seung. The film starring Jin Ki-joo, Wi Ha-joon, Park Hoon, Gil Hae-yeon and Kim Hye-yoon, depicts a life-threatening hide-and-seek scenario between a psychopathic killer and a deaf woman. The film was slated to release in 2020 but its release was postponed due to the resurgence of the COVID-19 pandemic. Finally the film was released simultaneously in theatres and via streaming media TVING on June 30, 2021. Midnight was also made available on iQIYI from 18 September 2021.

== Premise ==
Kyeong-mi is a deaf woman and a sign language counselor at the sign language call center who becomes the target of a serial killer Do-sik after she witnessed him stabbing So-Jung. Jong Tak, So-Jung's brother and a security guard sets out to protect his sister and Kyeong-mi. On the other hand Kyeong-mi's deaf mother also learns about this and helps Jong Tak in protecting them.

== Cast ==
- Jin Ki-joo as Kim Kyung-mi, a deaf person who works as a sign language counselor at a call center
- Wi Ha-joon as Do-shik, a serial killer, who attacks women and men at night
- Park Hoon as Jong-tak, brother of Choi Seo-jung, a former officer in the Marine Corps, currently working at a security company
- Gil Hae-yeon as Kyung-mi's mother
- Kim Hye-yoon as Choi So-jung, Jong-tak's younger sister
- Kang In-seo as male employee 1
- Noh Su-min as couple man
- Na Eun-saem as couple woman
- Lee Jae-seok as employee 5
- Park Ji-hoon
- Song Yoo-hyun as section chief

=== Special appearance ===
- Bae Eun-woo as Police
- Kwon Young-min
- Bae Eun-woo as police 1
- Jung Wo Chang as Police 2

== Production ==
In August 2019, Jin Ki-joo and Wi Ha-joon confirmed their appearance for the film.

Filming began on September 8, 2019.

== Release ==
The film was released simultaneously in theatres and via streaming media TVING on June 30, 2021.

Midnight got an invitation from the Fantasia International Film Festival and the New York Asian Film Festival to screen the film. The three-week festivals were held from August 5 to 25 in Montreal, Canada and from August 6 to 22, 2021 in New York respectively. In the 20th New York Asian Film Festival, the film was screened in the 'Genre Masters' section on August 7, at Lincoln Center and SVA Theatre. In 25th Fantasia International Film Festival, the film was screened in the 'Canadian Premiere' section on August 22, 2021. It was also invited at the 13th UK Grimmfest Film Festival, held from October 7 to October 10, where it won the best feature award.

The film has also been invited to the New Zealand International Film Festival in Wellington edition to be screened on November 12, 2021.

The film entered the new director competition section of the 40th Brussels International Fantastic Film Festival and was screened for Belgian premiere on September 2, 2022.

== Reception ==
=== Box office ===
The film was released on June 30, 2021 on 693 screens. According to the integrated computer network for movie theater admissions by the Korea Film Council (KoFiC), the film was at third place on the Korean box office by collecting 25,566 audience on the opening day. It is at 21st place among all the Korean films released in the year 2021, with gross of US$796,540 and 108,523 admissions, as of December 12, 2021.

=== Critical response ===
On the review aggregator website Rotten Tomatoes, 100% of 17 critics' reviews are positive, with an average rating of 7.6/10.

Seo Jeong-won reviewing for Maeil Business quoted from Gayatri Chakravorty Spivak's, essays Can Subalterns Speak?, to highlight the subjugation of the 'subalterns' (sub-subjects) at the bottom of society, including women and migrants. Jeong-won opined that the way two mute and deaf women fought the serial killer and used their own means to confront the killer made it different. Ending review Jeong-won wrote, "The clear contrast between the stillness and the roar is also common. The more you watch Midnight with your breath, the more you can enjoy the film's gauguin."

Seoul Economic Daily reporter Choi Soo-jin reviewing the film wrote that the fast-paced chase of deaf and mute, in everyday space is the main attraction of the film. Quoting director Oh-seung Kwon, as: "It was made by grinding the cartilage of the actors," the reviewer wrote, "....the movie's charm is the performances of the actors running and running. Runs, slides, rolls and hangs on windows." Praising the performance of Jin Ki-joo Soo-jin wrote, "Jin Ki-joo's passion for acting, who plays Kyung-mi, who is deaf, also stands out." For other actors, Wi Ha-jun Wi and Park Hoon Soo-jin opined, "After the efforts of the two actors, an action scene full of hit was completed."

== Awards and nominations ==
Name of the award ceremony, year presented, category, nominee of the award, and the result of the nomination
| Award ceremony | Year | Category | Nominee / Work | Result | Ref. |
|---|---|---|---|---|---|
| Brussels International Fantastic Film Festival | 2022 | Emerging Raven | Midnight | Nominated | |
| Fantasia International Film Festival | 2021 | Silver Audience Award for Best Asian Film | Midnight | Won | |
| Grimmfest Film Festival | 2021 | Best Feature Award | Midnight | Won | |
