= Cha Hwa-yeon =

South Korean actress (born 1960)

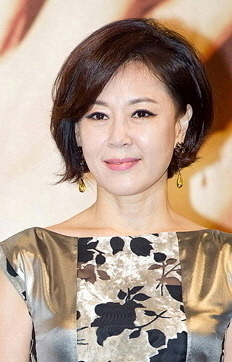
- Cha in March 2012
- Born: Cha Hak-kyung; January 25, 1960 (age 66); South Korea
- Occupation: Actress
- Years active: 1978–present
- Agent: Imagine Asia
- Spouse: Choi Dae-hyun (m. 1988; div. 2008)
- Children: 3

Korean name
- Hangul: 차학경
- RR: Cha Hakgyeong
- MR: Ch'a Hakkyŏng

Stage name
- Hangul: 차화연
- Hanja: 車和娟
- RR: Cha Hwayeon
- MR: Ch'a Hwayŏn

Cha Hwa-yeon (Korean: 차화연; born January 25, 1960), birth name Cha Hak-kyung (차학경), is a South Korean actress.

== Career ==
Cha made her acting debut in 1978, and became best known as the heroine Kim Mi-ja in the 1987 television drama Love and Ambition, a character who became an icon for modern Korean women in that era. She retired a year after getting married in 1988. Cha returned to acting twenty years later in 2008 with Aeja's Older Sister, Minja.

In March 2018, Cha signed with new management agency Imagine Asia.

== Filmography ==
=== Television series ===
| Year | Title | Role |
|---|---|---|
| 1978 | Woman's Face | |
| 1979 | In The Sunset Sky | |
| 1979 | 500 Years of Joseon Dynasty | |
| 1980 | Pilnyeo | |
| 1980 | Ahrong-yi Darong-yi | |
| 1980 | Daldongne (Moon Village) | |
| 1981 | Pursuit | |
| 1981 | Detective | |
| 1981 | TV Literature: "The Road to Sampo" | |
| 1981 | Now Is the Time to Love | |
| 1982 | TV Literature" "Ma" | |
| 1982 | Wind Flower | |
| 1982 | Diary of a Mom | |
| 1982 | Long Live Ttok-soon | |
| 1983 | Thaw | |
| 1983 | Geum-nam's House | |
| 1984 | Impatience | |
| 1985 | Lights and Shadows | |
| 1985 | Sun Rising Over the Hill | |
| 1986 | Her Portrait | Hee-jae |
| 1987 | Love and Ambition | Kim Mi-ja |
| 2008 | Aeja's Older Sister, Minja | Joo Min-ja |
| 2009 | The City Hall | Jo Yong-hee |
| 2009 | Temptation of an Angel | Jo Kyung-hee |
| 2010 | Jejungwon | Im Jo-si, Hwang Jung's mother |
| 2010 | I Am Legend | Mrs. Hong |
| 2010 | Sunday Drama Theater: "Lunch Box" | Park Sook-ja |
| 2011 | My Princess | Fashion designer (cameo) |
| 2011 | The Thorn Birds | Yoon Myung-ja/Lee Ae-rin |
| 2011 | Protect the Boss | Shin Sook-hee |
| 2011 | A Thousand Kisses | Yoo Ji-sun |
| 2011 | Pianissimo | |
| 2011 | You're Here, You're Really Really Here | Jeon Mi-ok |
| 2012 | Man from the Equator | Ma Hee-jung |
| 2012 | The Wedding Scheme | So Doo-ryun |
| 2012 | A Gentleman's Dignity | Seo Yi-soo's mother (cameo, episodes 16 and 19) |
| 2012 | Five Fingers | Na Gye-hwa |
| 2012 | Missing You | Kang Hyun-joo |
| 2013 | A Hundred Year Legacy | Baek Seol-joo |
| 2013 | King of Ambition | Baek Ji-mi |
| 2013 | Flower of Revenge | Min Hwa-young |
| 2013 | A Little Love Never Hurts | Hong Soon-ae |
| 2013 | The King's Daughter, Soo Baek-hyang | Do-rim |
| 2014 | Big Man | Choi Yoon-jung |
| 2014 | Make Your Wish | Shin Hye-ran |
| 2014 | It's Okay, That's Love | Ok-ja |
| 2014 | My Secret Hotel | (cameo) |
| 2014 | Family Secret | Jin Joo-ran |
| 2015 | My Mom | Yoon Jung-ae |
| 2017 | Hospital Ship | Oh Hye-jung, Eun-Jae's mother (Ep. 1-2) |
| 2018 | Secret Mother | Park Sun-ja |
| 2018 | My Only One | Oh Eun-young |
| 2018 | Encounter | Kim Hwa-jin |
| 2019 | The Golden Garden | Jin Nam-hee |
| 2020 | Once Again | Jang Ok-boon |
| 2020 | Run On | Yook Ji-woo |
| 2021 | Young Lady and Gentleman | Wang Dae-ran |
| 2021 | Now, We Are Breaking Up | Min Hye-ok |
| 2023 | Divorce Attorney Shin | Ma Geum-hee |
| 2023 | The Real Has Come! | Lee In-ok |
| 2024 | Beauty and Mr. Romantic | Baek Mi-ja |

=== Film ===
| Year | Title | Role |
|---|---|---|
| 1981 | Thoughts on Capitalism | |
| 1982 | Choi In-ho's Evening Color | |
| 1983 | The Sparrow and the Scarecrow | Ok-boon |
| 1985 | Cicada Singing in the City | |
| 1987 | A Long Journey, A Long Tunnel | (cameo) |
| 2009 | White Night | Seo Hae-yeong |
| 2011 | Sunday Punch | Soon-young |
| 2012 | Never Ending Story | Oh Song-kyung's mother (cameo) |

=== Variety show ===
| Year | Title | Notes |
|---|---|---|
| 1981 | Show Show Show | Host |

== Musical theatre ==
| Year | Title | Role |
|---|---|---|
| 2010–2011 | Really Really Like You | Shin Jang-mi |

== Awards and nominations ==
| Year | Award | Category | Nominated work | Result |
|---|---|---|---|---|
| 1978 | Miss Lotte Pageant | Winner | —N/a | Won |
| 1987 | 23rd Baeksang Arts Awards | Most Popular Actress (TV) | Love and Ambition | Won |
| 1987 | MBC Drama Awards | Top Excellence Award, Actress | Love and Ambition | Won |
| 2009 | SBS Drama Awards | Best Supporting Actress in a Special Planning Drama | Temptation of an Angel | Won |
| 2011 | MBC Drama Awards | Golden Acting Award, Actress in a Serial Drama | A Thousand Kisses | Won |
| 2011 | SBS Drama Awards | Special Acting Award, Actress in a Drama Special | Protect the Boss | Nominated |
| 2012 | KBS Drama Awards | Best Supporting Actress | Man from the Equator | Nominated |
| 2012 | SBS Drama Awards | Special Acting Award, Actress in a Weekend/Daily Drama | Five Fingers | Nominated |
| 2013 | MBC Drama Awards | Golden Acting Award, Actress | A Little Love Never Hurts | Won |
| 2014 | SBS Drama Awards | Special Award, Actress in a Miniseries | It's Okay, That's Love | Nominated |
| 2015 | MBC Drama Awards | Excellence Award, Actress in a Serial Drama | My Mom | Won |
| 2018 | KBS Drama Awards | Top Excellence Award, Actress | My Only One | Won |
| 2018 | KBS Drama Awards | Excellence Award, Actor in a Serial Drama | My Only One | Nominated |
| 2021 | KBS Drama Awards | Excellence Award, Actor in a Serial Drama | Young Lady and Gentleman | Nominated |
