= Siren's Kiss =

2026 South Korean television series

- Promotional poster
- Hangul: 세이렌
- Lit.: Siren
- RR: Seiren
- MR: Seiren
- Genre: Romantic thriller
- Created by: Cho Hyun-kyung
- Based on: Koori no Sekai by Hisashi Nozawa
- Written by: Lee Young
- Directed by: Kim Cheol-kyu
- Starring: Park Min-young; Wi Ha-joon; Kim Jung-hyun
- Music by: Heo Sung-jin
- Opening theme: "Hello" by Minnie
- Ending theme: "Deep" by: Heo Sung-jin; Diory
- Country of origin: South Korea
- Original language: Korean
- No. of episodes: 12

Production
- Running time: 60 minutes
- Production companies: Studio Dragon; Cape E&A

Original release
- Network: tvN
- Release: March 2 – April 7, 2026

Siren's Kiss (Korean: 세이렌) is a 2026 South Korean romantic thriller television series created by Cho Hyun-kyung, written by Lee Young, directed by Kim Cheol-kyu, and starring Park Min-young, Wi Ha-joon, and Kim Jung-hyun. Based on the 1999 Japanese television series Koori no Sekai by Hisashi Nozawa, the series follows an insurance investigator tracking a series of fraud cases involving the deaths of men who loved a mysterious woman, only to find himself dangerously digging into her life as a prime suspect. It aired on tvN from March 2, to April 7, 2026, every Monday and Tuesday at 20:50 (KST). It is also available for streaming on Amazon Prime Video internationally.

== Synopsis ==
Han Seol-ah, a high-profile art auctioneer at Royal Auction, becomes the center of a criminal investigation when a pattern emerges involving the mysterious deaths of her former lovers. Cha Woo-seok, an elite investigator for an insurance company's Special Investigations Unit (SIU) with a reputation for exposing life insurance fraud, is assigned to the case following an anonymous tip. As Woo-seok rigorously pursues Seol-ah as his primary suspect, he becomes increasingly entangled in a psychological tug-of-war with her, forcing him to determine if she is a lethal "Siren" orchestrating these deaths for profit or a victim of a sophisticated conspiracy.

== Cast and characters ==
=== Main ===
- Park Min-young as Han Seol-ah, the senior art auctioneer at Royal Auction
- Wi Ha-joon as Cha Woo-seok, the Deputy General Manager of the Special Investigation Unit at NH Life Insurance
- Kim Jung-hyun as Baek Jun-beom, CEO of IT company Your Home
- Han Joon-woo as Do Eun-hyuk, a photographer
- Kong Seong-ha as Gong Ju-yeong, a detective in the Violent Crimes Team 1 at Seoul Gangha Police Station
- Hong Ki-joon as Pyo Seong-il, the team leader of the Violent Crimes Team 1 at Seoul Gangha Police Station
- Kim Geum-soon as Kim Seon-ae, Chairman of Royal Auction

=== Supporting ===
==== Royal Auction staff ====
- Heo Jae-ho as Song Jae-wook, Executive Managing Director of Royal Auction
- Lee Elijah as Kim Yoon-ji (special appearance), an art auctioneer at Royal Auction
- Jung La-el as Park Na-hee, a Royal Auction staff member
- Kim Si-hyun as Go Sang-mi, a Royal Auction staff member
- Kang Dong-wook as Nam Tae-seok, the youngest Royal Auction staff member

==== Woo-seok's company ====
- Lee Du-jin as Gu Won-il, the team leader of the Special Investigation Unit at NH Life Insurance
- Jung Yong-ju as Ahn Young-soo, an assistant manager of the Special Investigation Unit at NH Life Insurance

==== Others ====
- Song Li-wu as Hwang Sook-ji, the owner of Midnight, a bar across from Royal Auction
- Han Chae-lin as Do Eun-hye, an intern at Royal Auction and the younger sister of Eun-hyuk
- Jung Eui-jae as Ha Eun-gyeom, the Junior Detective in the Violent Crimes Team 1 at Seoul Gangha Police Station
- Jeon Se-hyun as Kwon Soo-yeon, Seong-il's wife
- Jang Se-rim as Cha Woo-hee, a university student
- Park Ji-an as Joo Hyun-soo, an insurance fraud suspect

=== Special appearances ===
- Ha Seok-jin as Yoon Seung-jae, a restaurant CEO from a wealthy background and Han Seol-ah’s most recent boyfriend who separated from her despite prior plans for marriage
- Yoon Jong-hoon as Choi Young-ho, a psychiatrist who first met Seol-ah as her attending physician before the two entered into a relationship
- Kim Dong-jun as Lee Su-ho, an employee of an international relief organization who dated Seol-ah seven years ago until they broke up due to a difference in values

== Production ==
=== Development ===
Screenwriter Park Seung-hye, known for East of Eden (2008–2009) and A Man Called God (2010), was reported to be developing a new project. Initial reports in 2016 suggested that the series was under discussion for broadcast on KBS; however, following a statement from KBS that no decision had been made regarding scheduling, the project was shelved.

The series is an adaptation from the 1999 Fuji TV series Koori no Sekai. It is created by Cho Hyun-kyung, directed by Kim Cheol-kyu, written by Lee Young, and jointly produced by Studio Dragon and Cape E&A.

=== Casting ===
In March 2025, both Park Min-young and Wi Ha-joon were reportedly cast as lead. In August 2025, Kim Jung-hyun was reportedly joining.

=== Music ===
In a July 2025 interview, music director Heo Sung-jin revealed that she began working on the score and OST for Siren's Kiss well in advance of the production schedule. She noted her process involves reviewing the script to compose individual tracks and preparing songs early to facilitate the casting of vocalists for the soundtrack.

== Release ==
tvN announced that Siren's Kiss is scheduled to premiere on March 2, 2026, occupying the channel's Monday-Tuesday slot at 20:50 (KST). Amazon Prime Video confirmed that the series will be available for streaming on their platform excluding South Korea and China.

== Viewership ==
According to Nielsen Korea, the first episode of Siren's Kiss recorded an average audience share of 5.5% and a peak of 7.2% both nationwide and in the Seoul metropolitan area.

Siren's Kiss : South Korea viewers per episode (thousands)

Season	Episode number												Average
Season	1	2	3	4	5	6	7	8	9	10	11	12	Average
1	1330	1068	975	929	1045	989	909	910	1063	1024	971	1002	1018

Source: Audience measurement performed nationwide by Nielsen Korea.

Average TV viewership ratings
Ep.	Original broadcast date	Average audience share (Nielsen Korea)	
Ep.	Original broadcast date	Nationwide	Seoul
1	March 2, 2026	5.504% (1st)	5.499% (1st)
2	March 3, 2026	4.592% (1st)	4.352% (1st)
3	March 9, 2026	4.076% (2nd)	4.000% (2nd)
4	March 10, 2026	4.316% (2nd)	4.273% (2nd)
5	March 16, 2026	4.529% (1st)	4.676% (1st)
6	March 17, 2026	4.368% (1st)	4.220% (1st)
7	March 23, 2026	3.934% (1st)	3.738% (2nd)
8	March 24, 2026	4.024% (1st)	3.596% (1st)
9	March 30, 2026	4.798% (1st)	4.489% (1st)
10	March 31, 2026	4.361% (1st)	4.492% (1st)
11	April 6, 2026	4.277% (1st)	3.797% (1st)
12	April 7, 2026	4.483% (1st)	4.347% (1st)
Average		4.439%	4.290%
In the table above, the blue numbers represent the lowest ratings and the red numbers represent the highest ratings.; This series aired on a cable channel/pay TV which normally has a relatively smaller audience compared to free-to-air TV/public broadcasters (KBS, SBS, MBC, and EBS).
