= City of Damnation =

2009 South Korean film

- Theatrical poster
- Hangul: 유감스러운 도시
- Hanja: 遺憾스러운 都市
- RR: Yugamseureoun dosi
- MR: Yugamsŭrŏun tosi
- Directed by: Kim Dong-won
- Written by: Kim Dong-won
- Based on: Infernal Affairs by Alan Mak & Felix Chong
- Produced by: Choi Ju-seob
- Starring: Jung Joon-ho; Jung Woong-in; Jung Woon-taek
- Cinematography: Kim Hyo-jin
- Edited by: Jeong Gwang-jin
- Music by: Kim Si-hwan
- Distributed by: CJ Entertainment
- Release date: 22 January 2009
- Running time: 121 minutes
- Country: South Korea
- Language: Korean
- Box office: US$7.5 million

City of Damnation (Korean: 유감스러운 도시; RR: Yugamseureoun dosi) is a 2009 South Korean action comedy film directed by Kim Dong-won and is a remake of the 2002 Hong Kong film Infernal Affairs.

== Plot ==
Jang Chun-dong is a traffic officer who aspires to become a homicide detective. After being noticed by his superiors, Chun-dong is assigned to go undercover to infiltrate a gangster network headed by Yang Kwang-seob. Meanwhile, Lee Jung-dae (Jung Woong-in), a member of Kwang-seob's gang, goes undercover himself by joining the police force. Jung-dae tries hard to gain favour with his squad leader and bureau director in an effort to expose Chun-dong's identity, but falls in love with a colleague, Cha Se-rin.

== Cast ==
- Jung Joon-ho as Jang Chun-dong
- Jung Woong-in as Lee Jung-dae
- Jung Un-taek as Moon Dong-sik, a.k.a. Dae Ga-ri
- Park Sang-min as Ssang-kal
- Kim Sang-joong as Gangster boss Yang Kwang-seob
- Han Go-eun as Police lieutenant Cha Se-rin
- Sunwoo Jae-duk as Squad leader Park Jong-gi
- Park Yong-gi as Bureau director Cheon Seong-gi
- Kim Dae-hee as Won Sam-i, a.k.a. Won Sung-i
- Kang Seong-pil as Yang Pal-i
- Kim Young-hoon as Chef camouflage worker

== Release ==
City of Damnation was released in South Korea on 22 January 2009, and was the only Korean film to be released during the Lunar New Year holiday, traditionally a big season for domestic films. On its opening weekend it was ranked third at the box office with 249,720 admissions, and the film's disappointing performance was thought to illustrate a steady decline in the popularity of the gangster comedy genre with local audiences. As of 22 February, City of Damnation had received a total of 1,555,039 admissions nationwide, and as of 1 March had grossed a total of US$7,545,744.

== See also ==
- The Departed
- Infernal Affairs
