= Lee Eun-sung =

South Korean actress (born 1988)

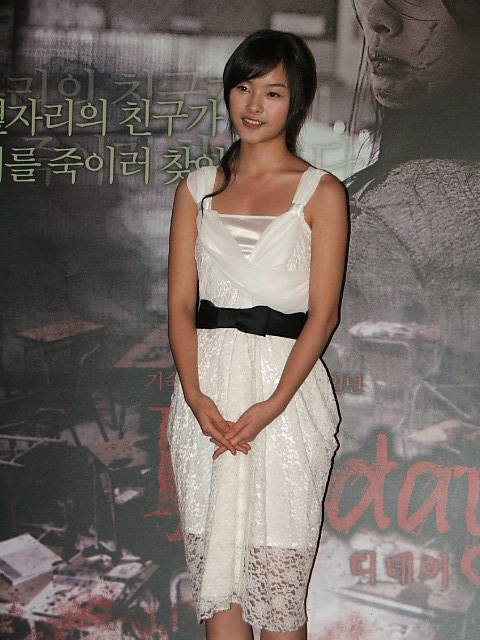
- Lee in 2006
- Born: August 8, 1988 (age 38); Incheon, South Korea
- Other name: Lee Eun-seong
- Occupation: Actress
- Years active: 2003–2009
- Spouse: Seo Taiji (m. 2013)
- Children: 1

Korean name
- Hangul: 이은성
- RR: I Eunseong
- MR: I Ŭnsŏng

Lee Eun-sung (Korean: 이은성; born August 8, 1988) is a South Korean actress. She made her acting debut in the youth drama Sharp, followed by roles in the television series Evasive Inquiry Agency (2007), and the films Dasepo Naughty Girls (2006), Milky Way Liberation Front (2007), and Take Off (2009).

== Personal life ==
Lee married rocker Seo Taiji, who is sixteen years her senior, on June 26, 2013, at Seo's newly built home in an affluent part of Pyeongchang-dong in northern Seoul, with only family members present. They met when Lee appeared in the music video "Bermuda Triangle" for Seo's eighth album in 2008, and the couple began dating in 2009. Their first child, a daughter, was born on August 27, 2014.

== Filmography ==
=== Film ===
Year	Title	Role
2006	Four Horror Tales - Roommates	Kim Bo-ram
2006	Dasepo Naughty Girls	Double Eyes
2007	The Old Garden	Eun-gyeol
2007	Milky Way Liberation Front	Eun-sung
2008	Hellcats	Kang-ae's cosmetics staff (cameo)
2008	The Devil's Game	Joo Eun-ah
2009	Take Off	Bang Soo-yeon

=== Television drama ===
Year	Title	Role	Network
2003	Sharp 1	Seo Jung-min	KBS2
2005	Sharp 2	Seo Jung-min	KBS2
2007	Que Sera Sera	Han Ji-soo	MBC
2007	Evasive Inquiry Agency	Yoo Eun-jae	KBS2
2008	I Am Happy	Park Ae-da	SBS

=== Music video appearances ===
Year	Song title	Artist
2004	"Footprints"	T.O
2007	"Fan"	Epik High
2008	"Drifting Apart"	Sweet Sorrow
2008	"Bermuda Triangle"	Seo Taiji
