= List of 2006 box office number-one films in South Korea =

This is a list of films which have been placed number-one at the South Korean box office during 2006, based on admissions.

== Number-one films ==
†	This implies the highest-grossing movie of the year.

Weekend End Date	Film title	Weekend Admissions	Ref.
1 January	The King and the Clown	752,242	
8 January	The King and the Clown	811,590	
15 January	The King and the Clown	880,685	
22 January	My Boss, My Teacher	1,106,825	
29 January	My Boss, My Teacher	828,704	
5 February	The King and the Clown	556,219	
12 February	Vampire Cop Ricky	492,272	
19 February	Oh! My God	373,861	
26 February	Forbidden Quest	600,715	
5 March	Forbidden Quest	374,291	
12 March	Daisy	411,425	
19 March	Bewitching Attraction	279,759	
26 March	Almost Love	539,307	
2 April	Almost Love	322,262	
9 April	My Scary Girl	407,317	
16 April	My Scary Girl	347,179	
23 April	My Scary Girl	295,752	
30 April	Bloody Tie	469,917	
7 May	Mission: Impossible III	1,062,497	
14 May	Mission: Impossible III	817,363	
21 May	The Da Vinci Code	947,711	
28 May	The Da Vinci Code	494,507	
4 June	Poseidon	526,264	
11 June	Poseidon	340,834	
18 June	X-Men: The Last Stand	582,128	
25 June	X-Men: The Last Stand	316,679	
2 July	Superman Returns	561,771	
9 July	Pirates of the Caribbean: Dead Man's Chest	880,165	
16 July	Hanbando	790,502	
23 July	Hanbando	560,438	
30 July	The Host †	1,612,090	
6 August	The Host †	1,537,545	
13 August	The Host †	913,327	
20 August	The Host †	718,400	
27 August	The Host †	419,043	
3 September	Nihon Chinbotsu	331,360	
10 September	Between Love and Hate	204,058	
17 September	Maundy Thursday	617,867	
24 September	Marrying the Mafia III	690,183	
1 October	Tazza: The High Rollers	767,851	
8 October	Tazza: The High Rollers	1,036,131	
15 October	Tazza: The High Rollers	509,366	
22 October	Righteous Ties	450,134	
29 October	The Devil Wears Prada	266,811	
5 November	The Devil Wears Prada	204,428	
12 November	Love Me Not	190,624	
19 November	How the Lack of Love Affects Two Men	179,489	
26 November	Sunflower	267,065	
3 December	Sunflower	188,462	
10 December	I'm a Cyborg, But That's OK	326,990	
17 December	200 Pounds Beauty	610,083	
24 December	Night at the Museum	731,851	
31 December	Night at the Museum	747,106	

== Highest-grossing films ==
Highest-grossing films of 2006 (by admissions)
Rank	Title	Country	Admissions	Domestic gross
1.	The Host	South Korea	10,917,153	US$58.8 million
2.	King and the Clown	South Korea	9,793,917	US$54.3 million
3.	Tazza: The High Rollers	South Korea	5,685,441	US$31.9 million
4.	Mission: Impossible III	United States	5,127,003	US$28.3 million
5.	My Boss, My Teacher	South Korea	5,074,314	US$28.2 million
6.	Pirates of the Caribbean: Dead Man's Chest	United States	3,911,617	US$21 million
7.	Hanbando	South Korea	3,331,593	US$18.2 million
8.	200 Pounds Beauty	South Korea	3,224,865	US$16.7 million
9.	The Da Vinci Code	United States	3,022,936	US$16.6 million
10.	Marrying the Mafia III	South Korea	2,598,859	US$14.1 million

Highest-grossing domestic films of 2006 (by admissions)
Rank	Title	Admissions	Domestic gross
1.	The Host	10,917,153	US$58.8 million
2.	King and the Clown	9,793,917	US$54.3 million
3.	Tazza: The High Rollers	5,685,441	US$31.9 million
4.	My Boss, My Teacher	5,074,314	US$28.2 million
5.	Hanbando	3,331,593	US$18.2 million
6.	200 Pounds Beauty	3,224,865	US$16.7 million
7.	Marrying the Mafia III	2,598,859	US$14.1 million
8.	Maundy Thursday	2,472,035	US$13.2 million
9.	Forbidden Quest	2,304,365	US$13.2 million
10.	My Scary Girl	2,077,590	US$11.8 million

== See also ==
- Lists of South Korean films
