= Park Jin-woo =

South Korean actor (born 1983)

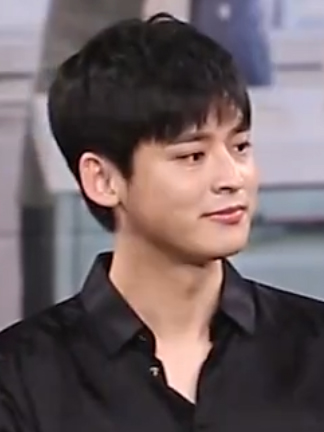
- Park in 2017
- Born: July 31, 1983 (age 43); South Korea
- Education: Dongguk University - Theater and Film
- Occupation: Actor
- Years active: 2004–present
- Agent: Bel Actors Entertainment

Korean name
- Hangul: 박진우
- Hanja: 朴鎭宇
- RR: Bak Jinu
- MR: Pak Chinu

Park Jin-woo (born July 31, 1983) is a South Korean actor. He made his acting debut in 2004 with the romantic comedy My Little Bride and sitcom Nonstop 5. Park has since starred in films and television series such as Dasepo Naughty Girls (2006), Frivolous Wife (2008), I'll Give You Everything (2009), and Love On A Rooftop (2015).

== Filmography ==
=== Film ===
Year	Title	Role
2004	My Little Bride	Lee Jung-woo
2006	Dasepo Naughty Girls	Anthony
2008	Frivolous Wife	Lee Jeong-do

=== Television series ===
Year	Title	Role
2004	Nonstop 5	Park Jin-woo
2005	Ice Girl	young Jung Ha-rok
2006	Bad Family	Ha Tae-kyung
2007	Dear Lover	Kang Chul
2007	Unstoppable Marriage	Goo Jong-jae
2008	Bichunmoo	Namgung Seong
2008	Painter of the Wind	Jang Hyo-won
2009	Empress Cheonchu	Yoo Hyung-gan
2009	I'll Give You Everything	Lee Kang-ho
2012	Glass Mask	Kim Ha-joon
2013	Medical Top Team	Song Beom-joon
2014	Jeong Do-jeon	King Woo
2015	Love on a Rooftop	Kang Do-jin
2017	Man in the Kitchen	Lee So-won
2019	Shady Mom-in-Law	Oh Eun-seok
2020	Memorist	Cameo (Ep. 1)
2021	Spanish Melody	Tae-hoon / audio drama
2022	Two Universes	Bong Soo-seok
