= Kim Dong-won (director, born 1962) =

South Korean filmmaker (born 1962)

- Born: 1962 (age 63–64); South Korea
- Occupations: Film director, screenwriter

Korean name
- Hangul: 김동원
- RR: Gim Dongwon
- MR: Kim Tongwŏn

Kim Dong-won (Korean: 김동원; born 1962) is a South Korean film director and screenwriter. Kim's directorial debut, the comedy film My Boss, My Teacher, was a hit at the box office with more than 6.1 million admissions, making it the fourth best-selling film of 2006.

His third feature R2B: Return to Base (2012), a remake of Shin Sang-ok's 1964 film Red Scarf, is Korea's first-ever aerial action blockbuster which starred Rain.

== Filmography ==
- My Boss, My Teacher (2006) - director, screenwriter
- City of Damnation (2009) - director, screenwriter, original idea, script editor
- R2B: Return to Base (2012) - director, screenwriter, executive producer
