= Dark Forest (film) =

- Theatrical poster
- Hangul: 죽음의 숲
- RR: Jugeumui sup
- MR: Chugŭmŭi sup
- Directed by: Kim Jeong-min
- Written by: Kim Jeong-min
- Produced by: Ahn Byeong-ki
- Starring: So Yi-hyun; Lee Jong-hyuk; Kim Young-joon; Choi Seong-min; Park Choong-seon
- Cinematography: Kim Hoon-kwang
- Edited by: Park Se-hui; Lee Jun-gyu
- Music by: Oh Bong-jun
- Distributed by: CJ Entertainment
- Release date: 17 August 2006
- Running time: 90 minutes
- Country: South Korea
- Language: Korean
- Budget: $1 million

Dark Forest (Korean: 죽음의 숲; RR: Jugeumui sup; lit. 'Forest of Death') is a 2006 South Korean film and the final installment of the 4 Horror Tales film series.

== Cast ==
- So Yi-hyun
- Lee Jong-hyuk
- Kim Young-joon
- Choi Seong-min
- Park Choong-seon
