= Roommates (2006 South Korean film) =

- Theatrical poster
- Hangul: 디데이
- RR: Didei
- MR: Tidei
- Directed by: Kim Eun-kyeong
- Written by: Kim Eun-kyeong
- Produced by: Ahn Byeong-ki
- Starring: Lee Eun-sung; Yoo Joo-hee; Kim Ri-na; Heo Jin-yong; Seo Hye-rin
- Cinematography: Kim Hoon-kwang
- Edited by: Park Se-hui
- Music by: Oh Bong-jun
- Distributed by: CJ Entertainment
- Release date: 3 August 2006
- Running time: 90 minutes
- Country: South Korea
- Language: Korean
- Budget: $1 million

Roommates (Korean: 디데이; lit. 'D-day') is a 2006 South Korean film and the third installment of the 4 Horror Tales film series, all with different directors but with the same producer; Ahn Byeong-ki.

== Plot ==
Roommates Yoo-jin, Eun-soo, Bo-ram, and Da-young are cramming for a college entrance exam. It's difficult for them to adapt to the stifling atmosphere of the all female lodging institute and to get along with each other, due to their differing personalities. Yoo-jin has the most difficulty with the stuffy institute life. She begins to have visions of events that took place at the institute in the past, such as the tragic fire that occurred years ago. Yoo-jin gradually becomes consumed with fear, and the relationship among the four begins to suffer with dangerous results.

== Cast ==
- Jung-in Choi as Assistant Teacher
- Kim Joo-ryoung as Teacher No.2
- Lee Eun-sung as Kim Bo-ram
- Shin Yeong-jin
- Yoon Da-gyeong as Housemother
- Heo Jin-yong
- Kim Young-sun as Park Soon-ok
- Kim Ri-na
- Yoo Ho-rin
