= Soando =

Island in South Jeolla Province, South Korea

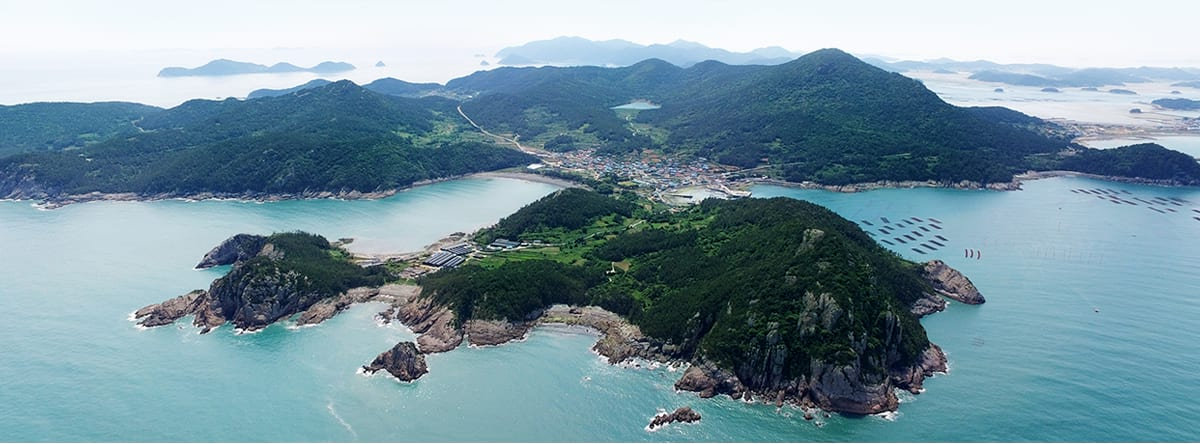
- Aerial view of part of the island (2017)
- Interactive map of Soando

Geography
- Location: Namhae
- Coordinates: 34.146°N 126.652°E
- Area: 23.16 km^{2} (8.94 sq mi)
- Coastline: 42 km (26.1 mi)
- Highest elevation: 359 m (1178 ft)
- Highest point: Gahaksan

Administration
- South Korea
- Province: South Jeolla Province
- County: Wando County

Soando (Korean: 소안도; Hanja: 所安島) is an island in the sea Namhae, in Soan-myeon, Wando County, South Jeolla Province, South Korea.

It has an area of 23.16 km^{2} (8.94 mi^{2}). It is part of the Soan Archipelago (소안군도; 所安群島), along with Nohwado (노화도), Bogildo (보길도), Hwinggando (횡간도), and Dangsado (당사도). It is part of the Dadohaehaesang National Park.

== Description ==
It has an area of 23.16 km^{2} (8.94 mi^{2}) and coastline length of 42 km (26 mi). Its highest point is the peak Gahaksan (가학산), at a height of 359 m (1,178 ft). It also has the mountains Daebongsan (대봉산), Buheungsan (부흥산), and Abusan (아부산).

In 2013, it had a population of 2,862 people in 1,364 households. Of those people, 1,059 were over the age of 65.

== History ==
In the Veritable Records of the Joseon Dynasty, the island was said to be a hiding spot for criminals and escapees. Attacks from Japanese pirates (wokou) were reportedly frequent.

In 1905, the island was seized by the pro-Japanese Korean viscount Yi Kiyong. The island's residents filed a lawsuit against Yi in 1909, and eventually won it in February 1922. In 1909, Japan built a lighthouse on the island.

The island was reportedly active in the Korean independence movement during the 1910–1945 colonial period. The island participated in the 1919 March First Movement, at the spearheading of its resident Song Naeho (송내호).

More than 800 of its 6,000 residents were branded as futeisenjin, a Japanese-language term meaning "suspicious Korean", and subject to heavy monitoring. After the colonial period, the island's role in the movement was reportedly largely forgotten until the 1980s. There are reportedly numerous contemporary newspaper articles now known about this part of the island's history.

There is now a museum dedicated to this period (소안항일운동기념관). Twenty of the island's former residents have been retroactively awarded the South Korean award Order of Merit for National Foundation.
