= Sharp (TV series) =

2003–2007 South Korean television series

- Title card
- Hangul: 반올림
- RR: Banollim
- MR: Panollim
- Genre: Drama
- Created by: KBS Drama Production
- Written by: Hong Ja-ram; Hong Jin-ah; Kwon Gi-kyeong; Lim Eun-ha
- Directed by: Choi Se-kyeong; Ha Tae-seok; Kim Jeong-hwan; Park Gi-hyeon
- Starring: Go Ara; Seo Hyun-seok; Yoo Ah-in; Lee Eun-sung; Kim Ki-bum; Kim Hee-chul
- Country of origin: South Korea
- No. of seasons: 3
- No. of episodes: 163+2

Production
- Running time: 50 minutes

Original release
- Network: KBS2
- Release: November 29, 2003 – February 25, 2007

Sharp (Korean: 반올림) is a Korean drama that aired from November 29, 2003, to February 25, 2007, on KBS2.

== Series overview ==
Series	Episodes	Originally released		Writers
Series	Episodes	First released	Last released	Writers
1	64	29 November 2003	27 February 2005	Hong Jin-ah; Hong Ja-ram; Kwon Ki-kyung
2	50	6 March 2005	26 February 2006	Park Sun-ja; Noh Yoo-kyung; Kwon Ki-kyung
3	51	March 5, 2006	February 25, 2007	Park Sun-ja; Yoon Ji-ryun

== Season 1 ==
- First aired : November 29, 2003
- Last aired : February 27, 2005
- Writers : Hong Jin-ah, Hong Ja-ram, Kwon Ki-kyung

=== Cast ===
- Go Ara as Lee Ok-rim
- Seo Hyun-seok as Jang Wook
- Yoo Ah-in as Yoo Ah-in
- Lee Eun-sung as Seo Jung-min
- Hyun Jung-eun as Lee Yoon-jung
- Kim Si-hoo as Lee Soon-shin
- Kim Jung-min as Park Se-ri
- Joo Bo-bi
- Oh Yeon-seo as Lee Ye-rim (Ok-rim's sister)
- Park Hoon-jung as Lee Ha-rim (Ok-rim's brother)
- Kang Seok-woo as Lee Sang-heum (Ok-rim's father)
- Lee Eung-kyung as Kim Sung-hee (Ok-rim's mother)
- Kwak Ji-min as Kang Dong-hee
- Kim Ha-kyoon as Kim Jung-sik
- Kim Ye-ryeong as Wook's mother
- Kim Hye-ok as Se-ri's mother
- Lee Min-ho as Jin-ho
- Kim Hee-jung as Lee Yu-ri (episode 36–37)
- Oh Soo-min as Jang Mi-yeon (episode 20)
- Heo Yi-jae as young Gong Yeon-hee (episode 42)
- Ryu Deok-hwan as Hwang Tae-min (episode 9)
- Hahm Eun-jung as Ye-rim's friend (episode 5)
- Choo Ja-hyun as Narration

== Season 2 ==
- First aired : March 6, 2005
- Last aired : February 26, 2006
- Writers : Park Sun-ja, Kwon Ki-kyung, Noh Yoo-kyung

=== Cast ===
- Go Ara as Lee Ok-rim
- Kim Ki-bum as Joo Yeo-myeong
- Lee Eun-sung as Seo Jung-min
- Kim Hee-chul as Baek Jin-woo
- Kim Hyun-joo as Lee Eun-young
- Ahn Nae-sang as Choi Jong-beom
- Park Hyung-jae as Ye Seok-doo
- Park Hoon-jung as Lee Ha-rim (Ok-rim's brother)
- Kang Seok-woo as Lee Sang-heum (Ok-rim's father)
- Lee Eung-kyung as Kim Sung-hee (Ok-rim's mother)
- Jung Ji-ahn as Ha Eun-shim

== Season 3 ==
- First aired : March 5, 2006
- Last aired : February 25, 2007
- Writers : Yoon Ji-ryun, Park Sun-ja

=== Cast ===
- Seo Jun-young as Park Yi-joon
- Jung Da-ya as Joo Shi-eun
- Seo Min-woo as Kong Yun
- Jang Ah-young as Jang Ah-young
- Kim Dae-sung as Lee Han-byeol
- Yeo Min-joo as Na Hae-mi
- Bae Geu-rin as Bae Geu-rin
- Jung Eun-woo as Uhm Sung-min
- Ahn Yong-joon as Bae Sung-jun
- Ahn Nae-sang as Choi Sung-beom
- Lee Won-jong as Park Jam-bong (Yi-joon's father)
- Kim Eul-dong as Han Jung-hee
