= Im Ho =

South Korean actor

- Im in 2021
- Born: January 27, 1970 (age 56); Seoul, South Korea
- Occupation: Actor
- Years active: 1993–present
- Agent: RaemongRaein

Korean name
- Hangul: 임호
- Hanja: 林湖
- RR: Im Ho
- MR: Im Ho

Im Ho (Korean: 임호; born January 27, 1970) is a South Korean actor, best known for his roles mostly as an emperor in historical dramas. His notable roles were included in the television series Jang Hui-bin (1995) and Jewel in the Palace (2003).

== Personal life ==
Im graduated from Chung-Ang University with a bachelor's degree in theater and film. Im's father is the late screenwriter Im Chung, who wrote Jang Hui-bin, among other television and film scripts.

== Filmography ==
=== Films ===
- Ghost Taxi as Byeong-su (2000)
- My Sassy Girl as the Blind Date guy
- Don't Tell Papa as Borisu (2004)
- Clementine as O Ji-hun (2004)
- February 29 as Bak Hyeong-sa (2006)
- Secret Love as hairstylist (2010)
- Earth Rep Rolling Series as Elvis (2010)

Source: Korean Movie Database

=== Television ===
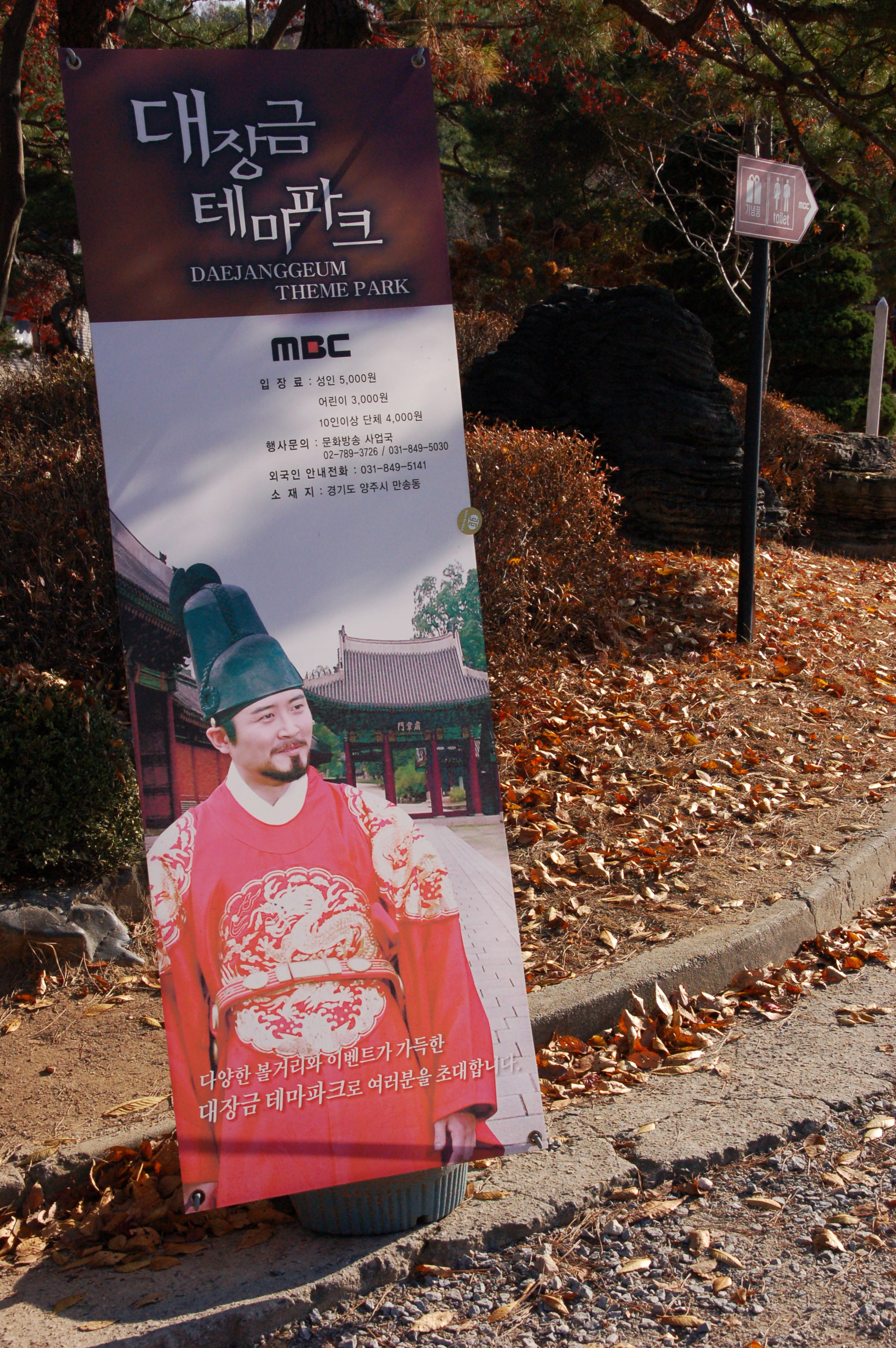
Entrance sign depicting Im Ho as King Jungjong on display at the Dae Jang Geum Theme Park.

- Suji & Uri as Kang Woo-chang (2024)
- Vengeance of the Bride as Yoon Jae-ha (2022, Cameo)
- President Jeong Yak-yong as Han Min-guk (2022, Film television)
- Haechi as Yi Kwang-jwa (2019)
- Blessing of the Sea as Jo Ji-hwan (2019, Cameo)
- Dal Soon's Spring as Han Tae-sung (2017)
- Teacher Oh Soon-nam as Jang Ji-ho (2017, Cameo)
- Night Light as Kang Jae-hyun (2016)
- Flowers of the Prison as Kang Seon-ho (2016)
- Page Turner as Yoon Yoo-seul's doctor (2016)
- The Merchant: Gaekju 2015 as Min Kyom-ho (2015)
- The Stars Are Shining as Seo Dong-pil (2015)
- Splendid Politics as Choi Myung-kil (2015)
- What Happens to My Family? as Judge (2014, Cameo)
- Jeong Do-jeon as Jeong Mong-ju (2014)
- Your Lady as Ra Jin-goo (2013)
- I Love Lee Taly as Geum San (2012)
- Gwanggaeto, The Great Conqueror as Murong Bao (2011)
- You Don't Know Women as Kang Sung-chan (2010)
- Queen Seondeok as Jinji of Silla (2009)
- He Who Can't Marry as Park Kwang-nam (2009)
- Wanted: Son-In-Law as Kim Tae-pyeong (2008)
- My Home (2008)
- Strongest Chil Woo as Crown Prince Sohyeon (2008)
- New Birth of Married Couple as Bong Su (2008)
- Kid Gang as Jo Pyo-gi (2007)
- Barefoot of Love as Hwang Jin-suk (2006)
- Dae Jo-yeong as Yeon Namsaeng (2006)
- Woman Above Flower as Yoon Myung-won (2005)
- Wind Flower as Choi Hyung-joo (2005)
- Not Alone (2004)
- The Woman Who Wants to Marry as Park Sun-woo (2004)
- Lovers (2003)
- Jewel in the Palace as King Jungjong (2003)
- Girls' School as Lee Gyu-won (2002)
- Man of the Sun, Lee Je Ma as Choi Moon-hwan (2002)
- Whenever the Heart Beats as Lee Jun-ho (2002)
- Her House as Nam Hyuk (2001)
- Honey Honey (2001)
- Everyday with You as Choi Dong-ha (2001)
- Rural Diary (2000)
- Due to You, Darling (2000)
- Because of You as Han Young-jun (2000)
- Hur Joon as Lee Jung-myung (1999)
- The Great King’s Road as Crown Prince Sado (1998)
- Fresh Son-Ja’s tactics (1998)
- Sea of Ambition as Jung Min-woo (1997)
- ManGang (Full-Heartedness) (1996)
- Jang Hee Bin as Sukjong of Joseon (1995)
- Due to Your Being (1994)

=== Television show ===
Year	Title	Role	Notes	Ref.
2016	King of Mask Singer	Contestant (Good Luck Examinee)	Episode 85	
2022	Time to change my body	Host	with Seol Soo-hyun	

== Theater ==
Year	English title	Korean title	Role	Ref.
2022	The Disloyal Cry	불효자는 웁니다	Jin Ho	
2022	Love Letter	러브레터	Andy	
