= Dasepo Naughty Girls =

2006 film by Je-yong Lee

- Hangul: 다세포 소녀
- Hanja: 多細胞 少女
- RR: Dasepo sonyeo
- MR: Tasep'o sonyŏ
- Directed by: E J-yong
- Written by: Choi Jin-sung
- Based on: Dasepo Girls by B-rate Dalgung
- Produced by: Ahn Dong-gyu
- Starring: Kim Ok-vin; Park Jin-woo; Lee Kyeon; Lee Eun-sung; Kim Byul; Lee Won-jong
- Cinematography: Chung Chung-hoon
- Edited by: Jeong Jin-wook; Choi Jae-geun
- Music by: Jang Young-gyu; Dalpalan
- Distributed by: Lotte Entertainment; Mirovision
- Release date: August 10, 2006 (South Korea)
- Running time: 99 minutes
- Country: South Korea
- Language: Korean
- Budget: US$3.2 million
- Box office: US$2.9 million

Dasepo Naughty Girls (Korean: 다세포 소녀; lit. 'Dasepo Girl; Multi-cell Girl') is a 2006 South Korean musical comedy film. It is based on the popular webtoon Dasepo Girls by B-rate Dalgung (Chae Jeong-taek), which has also been adapted into a TV series.

== Plot ==
The film takes place at Musseulmo High School (무쓸모고등학교 in Korean, literally "Useless High School"), situated somewhere in South Korea.

One of the students there is named "Poor Girl" (Kim Ok-vin). She walks around with a stuffed doll draped around her back, which she calls "Poverty." As her name implies, she comes from a very poor family. She lives with her mother (Im Ye-jin) in a one-room building. Her mother is chronically ill and buried in debt. To help pay for her mother's bills, Poor Girl has turned to prostitution to support her family. Because of this, she carries a heavy burden of guilt and shame, so much so that she has attempted suicide. Her only friend seems to be her doll, but then she meets and bonds with a new client.

The new client is a cross-dresser (Lee Won-jong), who's looking for a girl to play sisters with. Poor Girl is able to share some of her problems with her new-found friend. In the meantime, she dreams about dating her classmate Anthony (Park Jin-woo).

Anthony comes from a rich background. His adoptive parents are diplomats from Switzerland. Anthony goes through life as a materialistic, shallow person until he meets Double Eyes (Lee Eun-sung).

Double Eyes is the sister of Anthony's classmate Cyclops (Lee Kyeon) who is a social outcast at Museulmo High school. As his name indicates, he has only one eye. He is isolated due to his condition and is a constant target for pranks and jokes. While waiting for his sister Double Eyes at a restaurant, Cyclops is spotted by Anthony and his two friends. One of Anthony's friends asks Cyclops, "Does your sister have a third eye?" Anthony and his friends laugh until they see Cyclops's sister Double Eyes, who is beautiful. Anthony immediately falls in love with her. However, unbeknownst to Anthony, Double Eyes has a secret.

Meanwhile, students at the school begin behaving strangely. Kids who have never shown any interest in their education suddenly become immersed in studying and preparing for their college entrance exams, even giving up activities like dating.

== Cast ==
- Kim Ok-vin as Poor Girl
- Park Jin-woo as Anthony
- Lee Kyeon as Cyclops
- Yoo Gun as Woo-su
- Kim Byul as Bellflower
- Lee Min-hyuk as Te-ri
- Nam Ho-jung as Vice-President girl
- Park Hye-won as Class monitor
- Im Ye-jin as Poor Girl's mother
- Lee Eun-sung as Double Eyes
- Lee Yong-joo as President boy
- Lee Won-jong as Big Razor Sis
- Lee Jae-yong as Teacher
- Park Jae-woong as Soccer captain
- Yoo Ho-rin as some girl / Hare Krishna
- Kim Yoo-bin as noodle boy
- Kim Do-yeon as female gangster / last naive girl
- Lee Byung-joon
- Kim Han-joon as kidnapper
- Kim Ha-kyun
- Moon Won-joo as Gangster
- Kim Soo-mi as cameo
- Han Eun-sun as cameo
- Yong Yi as riverside lover
- Jang Joon-nyung as number 2 / chief guard
- Jo Jung-rin as cameo

== Awards and nominations ==
2006 Blue Dragon Film Awards

- Nomination – Best Art Direction – Lee Hyeong-ju

2007 Baeksang Arts Awards

- Nomination – Best Director – E J-yong
