= Kim Min-hee (actress, born 1972) =

South Korean actress (born 1972)

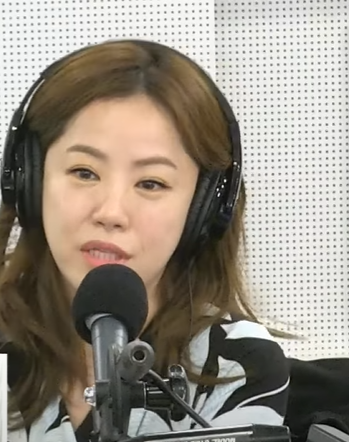
- Kim in April 2019
- Born: Kim Yoon-kyung; August 28, 1972 (age 54); South Korea
- Occupation: Actress
- Years active: 1978–present

Korean name
- Hangul: 김민희
- RR: Gim Minhui
- MR: Kim Minhŭi

Former name
- Hangul: 김윤경
- RR: Gim Yungyeong
- MR: Kim Yun'gyŏng

Kim Min-hee (Korean: 김민희; born August 28, 1972), born Kim Yoon-kyung and also known as Yeomhong, is a South Korean trot singer and actress.

== Filmography ==
=== Television ===
- Dal Soon's Spring (KBS2, 2017)
- Saimdang, Memoir of Colors (SBS, 2017)
- The Three Witches (SBS, 2015)
- Lucid Dream (SBS, 2015)
- Wang's Family (KBS2, 2013) cameo
- The Greatest Thing in the World (MBC, 2013)
- Just You (KBS1, 2011)
- KBS Drama Special: "The Woman from Olle Road" (KBS2, 2011)
- Saving Mrs. Go Bong Shil (TV Chosun, 2011)
- Aeja's Older Sister, Minja (SBS, 2008)
- Belle (KBS1, 2007)
- Thank You Life (KBS2, 2006)
- The Secret Lovers (MBC, 2005)
- Second Proposal (KBS2, 2004)
- Jewel in the Palace (MBC, 2003)
- Remember (MBC, 2002)
- Dad is the Boss (SBS, 1996)
- A Tree in Blossom by the Love (KBS, 1987)
- Long Live Ttok Soon (KBS1, 1982)
- Oddogi Squad (MBC, 1979)
- My Lady An Guk Dong (MBC, 1979)
- Spring Rain (MBC, 1979)

=== Film ===
- Black Republic (1990)
- The Wound of Love (1989)
- My Love 3 (1984)
- My Love 2 (1983)
- My Mother's Wedding (1982)
- The Hero, Pal Bul-chul (1982)
- The One Love (1981)
- Spring Rain in Winter (1981)

== Awards and nominations ==
Year	Award	Category	Nominated work	Result	Ref.
1981	Baeksang Arts Awards	Best New Actress	The One Love	Won	
