= Dolsing Fourmen =

South Korean television program

- Promotional poster
- Also known as: Invitation From Bachelor Agains
- Hangul: 신발 벗고 돌싱포맨
- Lit.: Shoes Off Return to Single Four Men
- RR: Sinbal beotgo dolsingpomaen
- MR: Sinbal pŏtko tolsingp'omaen
- Genre: Talk show; Variety
- Starring: Tak Jae-hoon; Im Won-hee; Lee Sang-min; Kim Jun-ho
- Country of origin: South Korea
- Original language: Korean
- No. of seasons: 1
- No. of episodes: 213

Production
- Running time: 90 minutes

Original release
- Network: SBS
- Release: July 13, 2021 – December 23, 2025

Related
- My Little Old Boy; Reckless but Happy

Dolsing Fourmen (Korean: 신발 벗고 돌싱포맨) is a South Korean television program that currently airs on SBS weekly on Tuesday nights. The first episode was aired on July 13, 2021 at 22:00 (KST). The program ended on December 23, 2025.

== Format ==
Labeled a spin-off of the popular SBS reality show My Little Old Boy, it is a talk and variety show starring four male celebrities averaging more than 50.5 years old in age, had divorced, and are more thirsty for happiness than anyone else. In each episode, the cast members and guests have conversations and share personal stories about career, love, marriage, etc.

== Cast ==
- Tak Jae-hoon
- Im Won-hee
- Lee Sang-min
- Kim Jun-ho

== Episodes (2021) ==
List of episodes in 2021

| Ep. | Broadcast Date | Guests | Ref. |
|---|---|---|---|
| 1 | July 13 | P.O (Block B), Mino (Winner), Seo Jang-hoon | |
| 2 | July 20 | Seo Jang-hoon, Kim In-sook | |
| 3 | August 3 | Choi Soo-jong, Ha Hee-ra | |
| 4 | August 10 | Kim Young-ok, Kim Yong-rim, Kim Soo-mi | |
| 5 | August 17 | Kim Jung-hwan, Gu Bon-gil, Kim Jun-ho, Oh Sang-uk | |
| 6 | September 7 | Jessi, Jun Jin (Shinhwa) | |
| 7 | September 14 | Lee Sang-yoon, Jin Seo-yeon | |
| 8 | September 21 | Kim Jung-hwan, Gu Bon-gil, Kim Jun-ho, Oh Sang-uk | |
| 9 | September 28 | Seo Jang-hoon | |
| 10 | October 5 | Kim Min-jong, Kim Jong-min (Koyote), Kim Min-jeong | |
| 11 | October 12 | Lee Seong-mi, Lee Kyung-sil, Jo Hye-ryun | |
| 12 | October 19 | Choi Si-won (Super Junior), Jung Yong-hwa (CNBLUE) | |
| 13 | October 26 | Hong Joon-pyo, Lee Soon-sam | |
| 14 | November 2 | Bae Do-hwan, Jang Ho-il, Kim Sung-soo (Cool), Yoon Gi-won, Im Hyung-joon, Kim Sang-hyuk | |
| 15 | November 9 | Bae Do-hwan, Jang Ho-il, Kim Sung-soo (Cool), Yoon Gi-won, Im Hyung-joon, Kim Sang-hyuk; Jang Dong-min, Young Tak, Yang Se-hyung | (Note: Young Tak was mostly edited out due to a sajaegi controversy involving his company.) |
| 16 | November 16 | Jang Dong-min, Young Tak, Yang Se-hyung, Yeom Seung-hwan; Jang Yoon-jeong | |
| 17 | November 23 | Cha Tae-hyun, Kim Jong-kook | |
| 18 | November 30 | Lee Kyung-kyu | |
| 19 | December 7 | Lee Kyung-kyu; Bae Do-hwan, Jang Ho-il, Kim Sung-soo (Cool), Yoon Gi-won, Kim Sang-hyuk, Eom Young-su, Kim In-sook | |
| 20 | December 14 | Jo Young-nam, Nam Jin, Sul Woon-do, Jin Sung | |
| 21 | December 21 | Lee So-ra, DinDin | |
| 22 | December 28 | Yoon Gi-won; Park Sun-young | |

== Episodes (2022) ==
List of episodes in 2022

| Ep. | Broadcast Date | Guests | Ref. |
|---|---|---|---|
| 23 | January 4 | Ji Sang-ryeol, Lee Tae-gon | |
| 24 | January 11 | Bae Do-hwan; Lee Bong-won, Park Joon-hyung | |
| 25 | January 18 | Jang Dong-min, Haha | |
| 26 | January 25 | Jee Seok-jin, Hyun Joo-yup | |
| 27 | February 1 | Kim Yeon-ja, Jang Yoon-jeong | |
| 28 | February 8 | Kim Yeon-ja, Jang Yoon-jeong | |
| 29 | February 22 | Choi Jin-cheul, Lee Chun-soo, Baek Ji-hoon | |
| 30 | March 1 | Kwak Yoon-gy, Park Seung-hi, Park Jang-hyuk | |
| 31 | March 8 | Kwak Yoon-gy, Park Seung-hi, Park Jang-hyuk; Choi Jin-cheul, Lee Chun-soo, Baek Ji-hoon | |
| 32 | March 15 | Super Junior (Leeteuk, Shindong, Eunhyuk, Donghae, Siwon) | |
| 33 | March 22 | Jeon Soo-kyeong, Lee Ga-ryeong | |
| 34 | March 29 | Shim Jin-hwa, So Yoo-jin, Hong Hyun-hee | |
| 35 | April 5 | Park Na-rae | |
| 36 | April 12 | Park Na-rae; Winner | |
| 37 | April 19 | Winner; Heo Kyung-hwan, Kim Dong-hyun | |
| 38 | April 26 | Jeong Jun-ha, Heo Kyung-hwan, Kim Dong-hyun | |
| 39 | May 3 | Kim Soo-ro, Sung Hoon | |
| 40 | May 10 | Jung Joon-ho, Choi Dae-chul | |
| 41 | May 17 | Im Chang-jung, Jun Jin (Shinhwa) | |
| 42 | May 24 | Kim Ji-min | |
| 43 | May 31 | Chae Ri-na, JeA (Brown Eyed Girls), Cheetah, Youjoung (Brave Girls), Choi Yoo-jung (Weki Meki) | |
| 44 | June 7 | Lee Dong-jun, Park Jun-gyu, Kim Bo-sung | |
| 45 | June 14 | Choo Sung-hoon, Nam Chang-hee | |
| 46 | June 21 | Noh Sa-yeon, Park Joon-hyung (g.o.d), Shin Gi-ru | |
| 47 | June 28 | Hong Seok-cheon, Jang Do-yeon | |
| 48 | July 5 | Heechul (Super Junior), Hyoyeon (Girls' Generation), Soyou; Kim Yong-myung, Hwang Je-sung, Kang Jae-jun | |
| 49 | July 12 | Kim Yong-myung, Hwang Je-sung, Kang Jae-jun; Park Sun-young, Kim Min-kyung, Lee Hyun-yi, Song Hae-na | |
| 50 | July 19 | Park Sun-young, Kim Min-kyung, Lee Hyun-yi, Song Hae-na, Bae Sung-jae, Jang Ji-hyun | |
| 51 | July 26 | Choi Daniel, Kim Se-jeong, Nam Yoon-su | |
| 52 | August 2 | Lee Eun-hyung, Pungja, Eom Ji-yoon | |
| 53 | August 9 | Pak Se-ri | |
| 54 | August 16 | June Kang, Kang Soo-jung, Gabee | |
| 55 | August 23 | Kim Bok-jun, Lee Hoon, Kim Yong-myung | |
| 56 | August 30 | Koyote | |
| 57 | September 6 | Sam Hammington, Jonathan Yiombi, Patricia Yiombi | |
| 58 | September 13 | Do Kyung-wan, Joo Woo-jae, Jasson | |
| 59 | September 20 | Park Jung-ah, Lee Ji-hyun, Seo In-young | |
| 60 | September 27 | Kim Byeong-ok, Kim Joon-bae, Lee Ho-cheol | |
| 61 | October 4 | Jang Young-ran, Kim Ho-young, Lee Guk-joo | |
| 62 | October 11 | Lee Won-jong, Jo Sung-ha, Kim Yong-myung | |
| 63 | October 18 | Hong Sung-heon, Kim Byung-hyun, Yoo Hee-kwan | |
| 64 | October 25 | Choi Yu-na, Hong Sung-woo, Hwang Hyun-hee | |
| 65 | November 8 | Mamamoo | |
| 66 | November 15 | Kim Tae-woo (g.o.d), K.Will, KCM | |
| 67 | December 13 | Lee Moon-sik, Yoon Shi-yoon | |
| 68 | December 20 | Kim Soo-ro, Kang Sung-jin | |
| 69 | December 27 | Shin Dong-yup, Seo Jang-hoon, Kim Jong-kook, Kim Jong-min, Heo Kyung-hwan | |

== Episodes (2023) ==
List of episodes in 2023

| Ep. | Broadcast Date | Guests | Ref. |
|---|---|---|---|
| 70 | January 3 | Eom Young-su, Bae Do-hwan, Jo Kwan-woo, Kim Sung-soo (Cool), Yoon Gi-won, Kim Sang-hyuk | |
| 71 | January 10 | Hwang Su-kyung, Jo Woo-jong, Mimi (Oh My Girl) | |
| 72 | January 17 | Hong Seo-bum, Ryu Seung-soo, Seo Eun-kwang (BtoB) | |
| 73 | January 24 | Kim Yong-myung, Jang Dong-min | |
| 74 | January 31 | Kim Yong-myung, Jang Dong-min | |
| 75 | February 7 | Kim Yong-myung, Jang Dong-min | |
| 76 | February 14 | Jung Yi-lang, Kim Kyung-wook/Tanaka, Kim Ji-min | |
| 77 | February 21 | Haha, Byul | |
| 78 | February 28 | Sunwoo Eun-sook, Choi Sung-kook, Lee Ahyumi | |
| 79 | March 7 | Lee Han-wi, Park Hwi-soon, Lee Ji-hoon | |
| 80 | March 14 | Choi Min-soo, Park Sung-kwang | |
| 81 | March 21 | In Gyo-jin, Han Chae-ah, Lee Mi-do | |
| 82 | March 28 | Jang Hyun-sung, Song Il-kook, Hong Ji-min | |
| 83 | April 4 | Kang Kyung-hun, Yoo Ji-tae | |
| 84 | April 11 | Uhm Jung-hwa, Kim Byung-chul | |
| 85 | April 18 | Choo Sung-hoon, Jong Tae-se, Yang Hak-seon | |
| 86 | April 25 | Park Hae-mi, Kim Wan-sun, Hwang Seok-jeong, Ha Eun-seom | |
| 87 | May 2 | Kim Jin, Sungjin, Ha Sung-yong | |
| 88 | May 9 | Kim Tae-hyeon, Mija, Jeon Seong-ae | |
| 89 | May 16 | Ahn Jae-wook, Lee Hong-gi (F.T. Island) | |
| 90 | May 23 | Eum Moon-suk, Tae Hang-ho, Gree | |
| 91 | May 30 | Lee Seung-chul | |
| 92 | June 6 | Lee Seung-chul | |
| 93 | June 13 | Jang Yoon-jeong | |
| 94 | June 20 | Kim Min-jun, Heo Kyung-hwan | |
| 95 | June 27 | Choi Yeo-jin, Park Se-mee, Ralral | |
| 96 | July 4 | Im Hyung-joon, Choi Gwi-hwa, Oh Dae-hwan | |
| 97 | July 11 | Lee Hye-jung, Park Joon-geum, Oh Jung-tae | |
| 98 | July 18 | Seo Jang-hoon, Song Hae-na | |
| 99 | July 25 | Yoo Se-yoon, Yang Se-hyung | |
| 100 | August 1 | Kim Ji-min | |
| 101 | August 8 | Pyo Chang-won, Kwon Il-yong, Hong Jin-ho | |
| 102 | August 15 | Park Jung-soo, Sandara Park, Hong Soo-ah | |
| 103 | August 22 | Kim Eung-soo, Kim Seung-soo, Shin Gi-ru | |
| 104 | August 29 | Jang Dong-min, Solbi, Kim Sae-rom | |
| 105 | September 5 | Nancy Lang, Kim Jong-min (Koyote), Park Gwang-jae, Kim Ye-won | |
| 106 | September 12 | Song Ga-in, Hong Ji-yun | |
| 107 | October 3 | Kyuhyun (Super Junior), Shin Kyu-jin, Yerin | |
| 108 | October 10 | Uhm Jung-hwa, Park Ho-san, Song Sae-byeok, Minah (Girl's Day) | |
| 109 | October 17 | Song Ga-in | |
| 110 | October 24 | Kim Dae-hee, Jang Dong-min, Yoo Se-yoon, Hong In-gyu | |
| 111 | October 31 | Jeong Seok-yong, Kim Gwan-woo, Jessi | |
| 112 | November 14 | Kim Hyun-jung, Chae Yeon, Lee Soo-young | |
| 113 | November 28 | Kim Bum-soo, Gummy | |
| 114 | December 5 | Kim Chang-ok | |
| 115 | December 12 | Lee Seung-yoon, Yang Dong-geun, Danielle Dongjoo Suh | |
| 116 | December 19 | Kim Ji-young, Yoo Sun, Jung Sang-hoon | |
| 117 | December 26 | Shin Hyo-bum, Kim Kwang-kyu, Shin Joo-ah | |

== Episodes (2024) ==
List of episodes in 2024

| Ep. | Broadcast Date | Guests | Ref. |
|---|---|---|---|
| 118 | January 2 | Park Ho-san, Min Kyung-hoon (Buzz), Seunghee (Oh My Girl) | |
| 119 | January 9 | Choi Yang-rak, Pang Hyun-sook | |
| 120 | January 16 | Seo Jang-hoon, Shindong (Super Junior), Lee Guk-joo, Na Sun-uk | |
| 121 | January 23 | Oh Ji-ho, Lee Jung-jin, Heo Young-ji (Kara) | |
| 122 | January 30 | Abhishek Gupta/Lucky, Christina Confalonieri, Brian Joo (Fly to the Sky), Kris Johnson | |
| 123 | February 6 | Moon Hee-joon, Eun Ji-won, Park Joon-hyung (g.o.d) | |
| 124 | February 13 | Lee Man-ki, Ahn Sun-young, Oh Min-suk | |
| 125 | February 20 | Seo Hyun-chul, Kim Jung-tae, Hong Yun-hwa | |
| 126 | February 27 | Park Yong-taik, Lee Dae-ho, Kim Sung-eun | |
| 127 | March 5 | Kim Soo-ro, Sung Hoon, Park Eun-seok | |
| 128 | March 12 | Mina, Park Eun-hye, Park Koon | |
| 129 | March 19 | Insooni, Park Mi-kyung, Shin Hyo-bum, Lee Eun-mi | |
| 130 | March 26 | Park Hang-seo, Kim Tae-young, Kim Nam-il | |
| 131 | April 2 | Jeong Bo-seok, Ha Hee-ra, Park Hyuk-kwon, Yoo Sun | |
| 132 | April 9 | Lee Jung, Lee Sang-yeob, Lee Seok-hoon (SG Wannabe) | |
| 133 | April 16 | Koo Jun-yup (Clon), Sayuri Fujita, Kim Sung-kyu (Infinite) | |
| 134 | April 23 | Im Ye-jin, Kim Jun-hyun, Lee Sang-jun | |
| 135 | April 30 | Park Yeong-gyu, Yoon Gi-won, Lee Jin-ho | |
| 136 | May 7 | Kim Won-hee, Choi Eun-kyung | |
| 137 | May 14 | Jang Hyuk, Hong Kyung-min | |
| 138 | May 21 | Yang Jung-a, Ye Ji-won, Woo Hee-jin | |
| 139 | May 28 | Lee Pil-mo, Lee Jong-hyuk, Ku Sung-hwan | |
| 140 | June 4 | Ryu Si-won, Moon Se-yoon | |
| 141 | June 11 | Lee Byung-joon, Han Chae-young, Im Woo-il | |
| 142 | June 18 | Lee Jung-eun, Choi Jin-hyuk, Jung Eun-ji (Apink) | |
| 143 | June 25 | Kim Jong-seo, Kim Kyung-ho, Kwon Hyuk-soo | |
| 144 | July 2 | Kang Kyung-hun, Lee Soo-kyung, Choi Yeo-jin | (Note: The supposed episode, featuring Hong Seok-cheon, Heo Ung and Heo Hoon as guests, was to be aired on this day. However, due to a controversy related to Heo Ung, it was replaced with the current filmed episode. The original episode would also not be belatedly released.) |
| 145 | July 9 | Kang Kyung-hun, Lee Soo-kyung, Choi Yeo-jin, Choi Jin-hyuk | |
| 146 | July 16 | Lee Seung-yeon, Lee Bon, Kim Ye-won | |
| 147 | July 23 | Lee Seung-yoon, Ryu Soo-young, ChoA | |
| 148 | August 13 | Kim E-Z, Lee Hee-jin, Shim Eun-jin, Kan Mi-youn | |
| 149 | August 20 | Suh Jung-hee, Danielle Dongjoo Suh, Choi Yeo-jin | |
| 150 | August 27 | Park Joon-hyung, Kim Ji-hye, Julien Kang, Park Ji-eun (JJ) | |
| 151 | September 3 | Solbi, No Min-woo, Hong Soo-ah | |
| 152 | September 10 | Han Go-eun, Pungja | |
| 153 | September 24 | Kim Wan-sun, Hwasa (Mamamoo), Kwon Eun-bi | |
| 154 | October 1 | Oh Jeong-tae, Heo Kyung-hwan, Kim Kyung-jin | |
| 155 | October 8 | Choi Moo-sung, Choi Won-young, Kim Sae-rom | |
| 156 | October 15 | Sunwoo Yong-nyeo, Lee Ji-hyun, Yoon Ga-i | |
| 157 | October 22 | Hong Seo-bum, Cho Gab-kyung, Han Young, Park Koon | |
| 158 | October 29 | Yoo Jun-sang, Jung Sang-hoon, Kim Gun-woo | |
| 159 | November 5 | Ji Sang-ryeol, Han Da-gam, Jo Hyun-ah (Urban Zakapa) | |
| 160 | November 12 | Noh Sa-yeon, Jung Ji-sun, Hahm Eun-jung (T-ara) | |
| 161 | November 19 | Jang Hee-jin, Solbi, Kim So-eun | |
| 162 | November 26 | Jang Hee-jin, Solbi, Kim So-eun | |
| 163 | December 3 | Sung Hoon, Jang Hee-jin, Solbi, Kim So-eun | |
| 164 | December 10 | Sung Hoon, Jang Hee-jin, Solbi, Kim So-eun | |
| 165 | December 17 | Hong Seok-cheon, Huh Gak, Choi Jin-hyuk | |
| 166 | December 24 | Lyuh Esther, Kim Kyung-ran, Im Woo-il | |

== Episodes (2025) ==
List of episodes in 2025

| Ep. | Broadcast Date | Guests | Ref. |
|---|---|---|---|
| 167 | January 7 | Kim Ji-ho, Lee Mi-do | |
| 168 | January 14 | Jo Hye-ryun, Kim Ji-sun, Kim Hyo-jin, Jeong Ga-eun | |
| 169 | January 21 | Hong Eun-hee, Han Hye-jin, Park Ha-sun | |
| 170 | January 28 | Jin Sung, Hong Jin-young, Yoyomi, Park Ji-hyeon | |
| 171 | February 4 | Uhm Ji-won, Kim Dong-wan (Shinhwa), Yoon Park | |
| 172 | February 11 | Jung Young-ju, Jung Gyu-woon, Kim Yong-jun (SG Wannabe) | |
| 173 | February 18 | Hong Jin-ho, Kim Ji-min, Sung Ji-in, Dasha Taran | |
| 174 | February 25 | Byun Jin-sub, Kim Jung-min, Song Ga-in | |
| 175 | March 4 | Jung Hye-sun, Park Jung-soo, Song Seon-mi, Lee Tae-ran | |
| 176 | March 11 | Lee Jong-hyuk, Yoo Sun, Yoon Hyun-min, Kim Yoon-ji | |
| 177 | March 18 | Yoon Jung-soo, Ji Ye-eun, Jeong Dong-won | |
| 178 | March 25 | Kim Soo-ro, Jo Hye-ryun, Um Ki-joon | |
| 179 | April 1 | Kim Jong-min (Koyote), Super Junior (Shindong, Eunhyuk), Son Dong-pyo | |
| 180 | April 8 | Lee Yo-won | |
| 181 | April 15 | Kim Jin, Park Se-woong, Sung Jin, Ha Sung-yong | |
| 182 | April 22 | Kim Won-hyo, Shim Jin-hwa, Kim Min-gi, Hong Yun-hwa | |
| 183 | April 29 | Orbit, Kim Jae-joong, Ham Soo-hyun | |
| 184 | May 13 | Sayuri Fujita, Cao Lu (Fiestar), Kim Seo-a | |
| 185 | May 20 | Lyn, Cheon Lok-dam, Hwanhee (Fly to the Sky) | |
| 186 | May 27 | Park Sun-zoo, Yoon Hye-jin, Bae Yoon-jung, Park Jenny | |
| 187 | June 10 | Kim Yong-bin, Son Bin-ah, Chun Gil, Choi Jae-myung, Chu Hyuk-jin | |
| 188 | June 17 | Lee Hye-jung, Lee Bong-won, Jo Hyun-ah (Urban Zakapa) | |
| 189 | June 24 | June Kang, Ha Won-mi, Park Joo-ho, Lee Gwan-hee | |
| 190 | July 1 | Han Hye-jin, Kang Eun-bi, Choi Yoon-young, Kang Daniel | |
| 191 | July 8 | Jeong Seok-yong, Kang Ye-won, Jung Ju-ri, Zo Zazz | |
| 192 | July 15 | Kim Young-ok, Jeon Won-ju, Shin Ji (Koyote), Kim Ji-min | |
| 193 | July 22 | Choi Jin-hyuk, Lee Joo-yeon, Shin Kyu-jin, Park Ki-ryang | |
| 194 | July 29 | Park So-hyun, Lee Eun-ji, Lee Mi-joo | |
| 195 | August 5 | Choo Sung-hoon, Park Ji-hyeon, Nam Yoon-su | |
| 196 | August 12 | Kim Jang-hoon, Yoon Jung-soo, Ailee, Kim Ji-you | |
| 197 | August 19 | Bae Jung-nam, Go Woo-ri, Cho Hyun-young, Kim Kyu-won | |
| 198 | August 26 | Kahi, Boom, Aiki | |
| 199 | September 2 | Cha Tae-hyun, Kim Jong-min (Koyote), Kim Ji-min, Leo Ranta | |
| 200 | September 9 | Hyun Young, Choi Hong-man, Lee Hyun-yi, Shim Eu-ddeum | |
| 201 | September 16 | Lee Ji-hye, Son Dam-bi, Kim Ddol-ddol | |
| 202 | September 30 | Kim Yong-rim, Seo Kwon-sun, Lee Gwan-hee | |
| 203 | October 7 | Kim Dong-hyun, Choo Shin-soo, Baekho | |
| 204 | October 14 | Jo Jung-chi, Choi Jung-in, Hong Jin-young, Yoon Ha-jeong | |
| 205 | October 21 | In Gyo-jin, So Yi-hyun, Kim Mi-ryeo, Park Se-mee | |
| 206 | October 28 | KCM, Choi Daniel, Lee Chang-sub (BtoB), Mamamoo (Solar) | |
| 207 | November 4 | Shin Bong-sun, Kim Min-kyoung, Park So-young | |
| 208 | November 11 | Shin Gi-ru, Hong Hyun-hee, Jasson, Paul Kim | |
| 209 | November 18 | Sam Hammington, Choi Hyun-woo, Dayoung (WJSN), San (Ateez) | |
| 210 | November 25 | Bae Sang-hoon, Jang Woo-hyuk, Yoo Tae-yang (Horseking), Hyojung (Oh My Girl) | |
| 211 | December 9 | Hwang Shin-hye, Yoon Da-hoon, Kim Min-woo (Mimiminu) | |
| 212 | December 16 | Shiho Yano, Lee Hye-jung, Park Jenny | |
| 213 | December 23 | Kim Jun-hyun, Brian Joo (Fly to the Sky), Son Tae-jin, Hyoyeon (Girls' Generation) | |

== Ratings ==
- The table below show the highest rating received in red, and the lowest rating in blue each year.

=== 2021 ===
List of ratings in 2021 (episodes 1-22)

| Ep. # | Original Airdate | Nielsen Korea Ratings (Nationwide) |
|---|---|---|
| 1 | July 13 | 5.3% |
| 2 | July 20 | 7.9% |
| 3 | August 3 | 4.9% |
| 4 | August 10 | 8.2% |
| 5 | August 17 | 5.7% |
| 6 | September 7 | 4.2% |
| 7 | September 14 | 4.6% |
| 8 | September 21 | 3.2% |
| 9 | September 28 | 3.9% |
| 10 | October 5 | 4.4% |
| 11 | October 12 | 4.9% |
| 12 | October 19 | 3.1% |
| 13 | October 26 | 4.5% |
| 14 | November 2 | 5.6% |
| 15 | November 9 | 5.3% |
| 16 | November 16 | 5.8% |
| 17 | November 23 | 6.2% |
| 18 | November 30 | 6.2% |
| 19 | December 7 | 3.1% |
| 20 | December 14 | 3.7% |
| 21 | December 21 | 3.6% |
| 22 | December 28 | 3.1% |

=== 2022 ===
List of ratings in 2022 (episodes 23-69)

| Ep. # | Original Airdate | Nielsen Korea Ratings (Nationwide) |
|---|---|---|
| 23 | January 4 | 3.8% |
| 24 | January 11 | 4.8% |
| 25 | January 18 | 4.4% |
| 26 | January 25 | 4.6% |
| 27 | February 1 | 8.2% |
| 28 | February 8 | 5.9% |
| 29 | February 22 | 6.2% |
| 30 | March 1 | 4.4% |
| 31 | March 8 | 3.8% |
| 32 | March 15 | 4.1% |
| 33 | March 22 | 3.6% |
| 34 | March 29 | 4.8% |
| 35 | April 5 | 5.1% |
| 36 | April 12 | 5.5% |
| 37 | April 19 | 4.5% |
| 38 | April 26 | 5.4% |
| 39 | May 3 | 6.4% |
| 40 | May 10 | 4.7% |
| 41 | May 17 | 5.2% |
| 42 | May 24 | 5.6% |
| 43 | May 31 | 3.6% |
| 44 | June 7 | 3.9% |
| 45 | June 14 | 3.7% |
| 46 | June 21 | 4.3% |
| 47 | June 28 | 6.2% |
| 48 | July 5 | 6.4% |
| 49 | July 12 | 5.8% |
| 50 | July 19 | 5.2% |
| 51 | July 26 | 5.3% |
| 52 | August 2 | 5.3% |
| 53 | August 9 | 4.7% |
| 54 | August 16 | 6.8% |
| 55 | August 23 | 6.5% |
| 56 | August 30 | 7.7% |
| 57 | September 6 | 5.9% |
| 58 | September 13 | 5.5% |
| 59 | September 20 | 5.7% |
| 60 | September 27 | 5.6% |
| 61 | October 4 | 4.4% |
| 62 | October 11 | 4.0% |
| 63 | October 18 | 4.5% |
| 64 | October 25 | 3.9% |
| 65 | November 8 | 3.2% |
| 66 | November 15 | 3.7% |
| 67 | December 13 | 3.3% |
| 68 | December 20 | 3.7% |
| 69 | December 27 | 3.2% |

=== 2023 ===
List of ratings in 2023 (episodes 70-117)

| Ep. # | Original Airdate | Nielsen Korea Ratings (Nationwide) |
|---|---|---|
| 70 | January 3 | 2.7% |
| 71 | January 10 | 2.8% |
| 72 | January 17 | 2.5% |
| 73 | January 24 | 3.6% |
| 74 | January 31 | 3.1% |
| 75 | February 7 | 3.2% |
| 76 | February 14 | 3.7% |
| 77 | February 21 | 4.6% |
| 78 | February 28 | 4.8% |
| 79 | March 7 | 4.2% |
| 80 | March 14 | 4.8% |
| 81 | March 21 | 3.8% |
| 82 | March 27 | 4.1% |
| 83 | April 4 | 3.3% |
| 84 | April 11 | 3.3% |
| 85 | April 18 | 3.6% |
| 86 | April 25 | 3.6% |
| 87 | May 2 | 4.5% |
| 88 | May 9 | 3.7% |
| 89 | May 16 | 3.6% |
| 90 | May 23 | 4.3% |
| 91 | May 30 | 5.3% |
| 92 | June 6 | 5.0% |
| 93 | June 13 | 5.1% |
| 94 | June 20 | 5.0% |
| 95 | June 27 | 5.6% |
| 96 | July 4 | 5.5% |
| 97 | July 11 | 6.4% |
| 98 | July 18 | 6.0% |
| 99 | July 25 | 6.0% |
| 100 | August 1 | 6.0% |
| 101 | August 8 | 6.0% |
| 102 | August 15 | 7.0% |
| 103 | August 22 | 6.6% |
| 104 | August 29 | 6.4% |
| 105 | September 5 | 5.3% |
| 106 | September 12 | 5.7% |
| 107 | October 3 | 2.1% |
| 108 | October 10 | 5.7% |
| 109 | October 17 | 4.7% |
| 110 | October 24 | 6.0% |
| 111 | October 31 | 5.9% |
| 112 | November 14 | 4.5% |
| 113 | November 28 | 4.6% |
| 114 | December 5 | 5.5% |
| 115 | December 12 | 4.8% |
| 116 | December 19 | 5.1% |
| 117 | December 26 | 5.4% |

=== 2024 ===
List of ratings in 2024 (episodes 118-166)

| Ep. # | Original Airdate | Nielsen Korea Ratings (Nationwide) |
|---|---|---|
| 118 | January 2 | 5.1% |
| 119 | January 9 | 5.0% |
| 120 | January 16 | 3.9% |
| 121 | January 23 | 5.4% |
| 122 | January 30 | 4.5% |
| 123 | February 6 | 4.9% |
| 124 | February 13 | 5.3% |
| 125 | February 20 | 4.7% |
| 126 | February 27 | 5.1% |
| 127 | March 5 | 4.6% |
| 128 | March 12 | 5.7% |
| 129 | March 19 | 4.7% |
| 130 | March 26 | 3.7% |
| 131 | April 2 | 5.7% |
| 132 | April 9 | 4.8% |
| 133 | April 16 | 6.0% |
| 134 | April 23 | 5.7% |
| 135 | April 30 | 5.8% |
| 136 | May 7 | 6.9% |
| 137 | May 14 | 4.4% |
| 138 | May 21 | 5.6% |
| 139 | May 28 | 4.9% |
| 140 | June 4 | 5.3% |
| 141 | June 11 | 3.5% |
| 142 | June 18 | 5.8% |
| 143 | June 25 | 4.4% |
| 144 | July 2 | 6.2% |
| 145 | July 9 | 6.1% |
| 146 | July 16 | 6.3% |
| 147 | July 23 | 4.8% |
| 148 | August 13 | 5.5% |
| 149 | August 20 | 5.7% |
| 150 | August 27 | 5.1% |
| 151 | September 3 | 5.1% |
| 152 | September 10 | 4.8% |
| 153 | September 24 | 4.9% |
| 154 | October 1 | 6.5% |
| 155 | October 8 | 5.2% |
| 156 | October 15 | 3.1% |
| 157 | October 22 | 6.5% |
| 158 | October 29 | 5.1% |
| 159 | November 5 | 5.9% |
| 160 | November 12 | 5.8% |
| 161 | November 19 | 6.0% |
| 162 | November 26 | 4.8% |
| 163 | December 3 | 4.1% |
| 164 | December 10 | 3.5% |
| 165 | December 17 | 4.2% |
| 166 | December 24 | 4.7% |

=== 2025 ===
List of ratings in 2025 (episodes 167-213)

| Ep. # | Original Airdate | Nielsen Korea Ratings (Nationwide) |
|---|---|---|
| 167 | January 7 | 4.5% |
| 168 | January 14 | 5.1% |
| 169 | January 21 | 5.6% |
| 170 | January 28 | 5.3% |
| 171 | February 4 | 5.1% |
| 172 | February 11 | 4.6% |
| 173 | February 18 | 5.5% |
| 174 | February 25 | 4.3% |
| 175 | March 4 | 5.5% |
| 176 | March 11 | 5.1% |
| 177 | March 18 | 4.9% |
| 178 | March 25 | 3.1% |
| 179 | April 1 | 3.7% |
| 180 | April 8 | 3.7% |
| 181 | April 15 | 4.8% |
| 182 | April 22 | 4.9% |
| 183 | April 29 | 4.5% |
| 184 | May 13 | 3.2% |
| 185 | May 20 | 2.7% |
| 186 | May 27 | 2.1% |
| 187 | June 10 | 2.6% |
| 188 | June 17 | 2.8% |
| 189 | June 24 | 2.9% |
| 190 | July 1 | 3.3% |
| 191 | July 8 | 3.7% |
| 192 | July 15 | 4.0% |
| 193 | July 22 | 3.6% |
| 194 | July 29 | 3.6% |
| 195 | August 5 | 4.0% |
| 196 | August 12 | 3.7% |
| 197 | August 19 | 3.6% |
| 198 | August 26 | 3.8% |
| 199 | September 2 | 3.3% |
| 200 | September 9 | 3.2% |
| 201 | September 16 | 3.2% |
| 202 | September 30 | 2.0% |
| 203 | October 7 | 2.2% |
| 204 | October 14 | 2.4% |
| 205 | October 21 | 2.3% |
| 206 | October 28 | 2.1% |
| 207 | November 4 | 2.7% |
| 208 | November 11 | 2.1% |
| 209 | November 18 | 2.3% |
| 210 | November 25 | 2.3% |
| 211 | December 9 | 2.6% |
| 212 | December 16 | 2.9% |
| 213 | December 23 | 2.3% |
