= List of My Little Old Boy hosts =

My Little Old Boy (a.k.a. Mom's Diary: My Ugly Duckling) is a South Korean television entertainment program, distributed and syndicated by SBS every Sunday at 21:05 (KST).

== Current hosts ==
Name	Episodes
Shin Dong-yup	1–present
Seo Jang-hoon	1–present

== Special hosts ==
Name	Episodes	Ref.
Kim Min-jong	21–22	
Kim Jong-min	23–24	
Cha Tae-hyun	25–26	
Sung Si-kyung	27–28, 241	
Tak Jae-hoon	29–30	
Kim Heung-gook	31	
Ahn Jae-wook	32–33	
You Hee-yeol	34–37	
Joo Sang-wook	38–39	
Park Myeong-su	40–41	
Oh Yeon-soo	42–43	
Yeon Jung-hoon	44–45	
Yoon Sang-hyun	46–47	
Kim Hee-sun	48–50	
Kim Jong-kook	50–51	
Chae Shi-ra	52–53	
Son Ji-chang	54–55	
Ahn Jung-hwan	56–57	
Kim Hyun-joo	58–59	
Son Tae-young	60–61	
Kim Jung-eun	62–63, 219	
Shin Seung-hun	64–65	
Kim Soo-ro	66–67, 69	
Go Joon-hee	68	
Kim So-yeon	70	
Lee Soo-geun	71–72	
Noh Sa-yeon	73, 101	
Kim Yong-man	74	
Jang Hyuk	76–77	
Seungri	77–79	
Song Ji-hyo	79–80	
Lee Da-hae	80–82	
Joo Byung-jin	82–84	
Hong Jin-young	84–85	
Im Won-hee	86	
Jung Ryeo-won	87–88	
Tae Jin-ah	89	
Lee Soo-kyung	90	
Kim Soo-mi	90–92	
Kim Hee-ae	93–94	
Park Joong-hoon	95–96	
Yoo Ho-jeong	97–98	
Shin Hye-sun	99–100	
Lee Seung-gi	102–103	
Im Chang-jung	104–105	
Lee Dong-gun	106–107	
Bae Jung-nam	108	
Jo Yoon-hee	109	
Kim Jun-hyun	110	
Yoon Do-hyun	111	
Lee Moon-sae	112–113	
Lee Min-jung	114–115	
Lee Sun-hee	116	
Park Joo-mi	117, 258	
Lee Beom-soo	118–119	
Shin Ae-ra	120–122	
Jun Jin	122	
Choi Soo-jong	123–124	
Lee Ha-nui	125	
Jung Il-woo	126	
Han Ye-seul	127–128	
Park Hee-soon	129–130	
Yoona (Girls' Generation)	131–132	
Lee Tae-ran	133–134	
Kim Young-kwang	135	
Kim Ji-seok	136	
June Kang	137	
Park Hyung-sik	138	
Kim Won-hee	139–140	
Go Jun	141–142	
Son Dam-bi	143	
Baek Ji-young	144	
Kim Bum-soo	145	
Kim Hee-chul (Super Junior)	146	
Ye Ji-won	147	
Ji Suk-jin	148	
Ha Hee-ra	149–150	
Han Chae-young	151	
Ku Hye-sun	152	
Hur Jae	153	
Cha Ye-ryun	154	
Han Go-eun	155	
Lee Sang-yoon	156	
Pak Se-ri	157	
Lee Sang-yeob	158	
Lee Seung-chul	159	
Lee Jung-hyun	160	
Lee Yeon-bok	161	
Choi Jin-hyuk	162	
Chun Jung-myung	164	
Choi Si-won (Super Junior)	165	
Jang Yoon-jeong	166	
Kang Daniel	167–168	
Park Tae-hwan	168	
Cho Kyu-hyun (Super Junior)	169	
Jung Yong-hwa (CNBlue)	170, 252-253	
Yoo Jun-sang	170–172	
Kim Min-jun	172–173	
Lee Sung-min	173–174	
Song Chang-eui	175	
Song Ga-in	176–177	
Bong Tae-gyu	178	
Jin Sung	179	
Yook Sung-jae (BtoB)	180	
Eun Ji-won	181	
Lee Tae-sung	182	
Yoon Shi-yoon	183	
Kim Sung-ryung	184–185	
Choi Kang-hee	186–187	
Kim Yonja	188	
So Yi-hyun	189	
Yoo In-young	190	
Lee Jong-hyuk	191	
Park Sun-young	192	
Kim Ho-joong	193	
Lee Moo-Saeng	194	
Jang Do-yeon	195	
Lee Jung-jin	196	
Yunho (TVXQ)	197	
Yoon Doo-joon (Highlight)	198	
Haha	199	
Oh Ji-ho	200	
Hwang Kwanghee	201	
Park Sung-woong	202–203	
Kwak Do-won	204–205	
Park Eun-bin	206	
Joo Hyun-mi	207	
Kwak Si-yang	208	
Jessi	209, 234	
Oh Yoon-ah	210	
Um Ki-joon	211	
Eugene (S.E.S)	212	
Lee Sang-hwa	213	
Park Ha-sun	214	
Lee Juck	215	
Kim Seung-woo	216	
BoA	217	
Jung Woo	218	
Kim Kang-woo	220	
Choo Ja-hyun	221	
Rain	222-223	
Yoon Kyun-sang	224, 294	
Minho (Shinee)	225	
Cha In-pyo	226	
Lee Da-hee	227	
Yoon Jong-hoon	228	
Namkoong Min	229	
Park Eun-seok	230	
Kim Hyuna & Dawn	231	
Kim Yoo-mi	232	
Rosé (Blackpink)	233	
Shin Sung-rok	235	
Jin Ki-joo	236	
Lee Je-hoon	237	
Kim Ok-vin	238-239	
Song Min-ho and Kang Seung-yoon (Winner)	240	
Oh Yeon-seo	242	
Seo In-guk	243	
Do Kyung-wan	244	
Kim Tae-gyun	245	
Jo Woo-jin	246	
Jung So-min	247	
Moon Chae-won	248-249	
Lee Seung-yuop	250	
John Park	251	
Lee Kwang-soo	253-254	
On Joo-wan	255	
Kwon Yu-ri (Girls' Generation)	256	
Ahn Hyo-seop	257	
Han Ye-ri	259	
CL	260	
Seungkwan & Vernon (Seventeen)	261	
Sunmi	262	
Gummy	263	
Lee Yeon-hee	264	
Heo Sung-tae	265	
Han Chae-ah	266	
Choo Sung-hoon	267	
Son Seok-koo	268	
Park Yong-woo	269	
Kim Joo-ryoung	270	
Ryu Hyun-jin	271-272	
Jin Seon-kyu	273-274	
Lee Sun-bin	275	
Uee	276	
Onew (Shinee)	277	
Jung Eun-ji (Apink)	278	
Moon Se-yoon	279	
Han Hye-jin	280	
Yeon Woo-jin	281	
Sunye	282	
Park Hae-joon	283-284	
DinDin	284	
Mijoo (Lovelyz)	285	
Son Ho-jun	286-287	
Kim Sang-kyung	288-289	
PSY	290-291	
Jung Joon-ho	292-293	
So Yoo-jin	295	
Shin Dong-wook	296	
Hong Hyun-hee (Comedian)	297	
Seo Young-hee	298	
Lee Se-hee	299	
Ji Hyun Woo	300	
Kim Ji-min	301	
Choi Daniel	302	
Jin Seo-yeon	303	
Chungha	304	
Choi Yeo-jin	305	
Zico (Block B)	306	
Jang Wooyoung (2PM)	307	
Eom Ji-Yoon	308	
Shin Bong-sun	309	
Joo Jong-hyuk	310	
Crush	311	
Jang Hyun-sung	312	
Jang Sung-kyu	313	
Simon Dominic	314	
Oh Na-ra	315	
Bae Sung-jae	316	
Hwasa (Mamamoo)	317	
Han Ga-in	318-319	
Song Eun-i	320	
Kim Bum-soo	321	
Ahn Young-mi	322	
Jay Park	323	
Shin Hyun-joon	324	
Shin Ji	325	
Im Soo-hyang	326	
Jung Sang-hoon	327	
Lee Kyung-kyu	328	
Kim Min-kyung	329	
Park Hyung-sik	330	
Joo Hyun-young	331	
Kim Nam-hee	332	
Lee Yong-jin	333	
Kim Ji-hoon	334	
Shin Ye-eun	335	
Joo Woo-jae	336	
Jang Hang-jun	337	
Kim Gun-woo	338	
Pyo Ye-jin	339	

== Former hosts ==
Name	Episodes
Han Hye-jin	1–20
