= Tiki-taCAR =

2021 South Korean television program

- Promotional poster
- Genre: Talk Show; Music
- Starring: Tak Jae-hoon; Kim Gu-ra; Eum Moon-suk; Kyuhyun (Super Junior)
- Country of origin: South Korea
- Original language: Korean
- No. of seasons: 1
- No. of episodes: 12

Production
- Production location: South Korea
- Running time: 90 minutes

Original release
- Network: SBS
- Release: April 4 – June 19, 2021

Tiki-taCAR (Korean: 티키타카) is a South Korean television program that airs on SBS weekly on Sundays at 23:05 (KST) from April 4, 2021. The first season ended on June 19, 2021.

== Format ==
The name of the program comes from Tiki-taka. The program is a new type of music talk show, where various celebrities who are currently the talks of the city are invited to board the specially designed bus. They engage in talks and sing songs together with the cast members on the bus, as these celebrities are brought to their destinations.

== Cast ==
- Tak Jae-hoon
- Kim Gu-ra
- Eum Moon-suk
- Kyuhyun (Super Junior)

== Episodes ==
Ep.	Broadcast Date	Guests	Song(s) Sung	Ref.
1	April 4	Lee Je-hoon, Esom	Shin Hae-chul - Invitation to Daily Life; Yang Soo-kyung - Love is Like the Rain over the Window; Country Kko Kko - Sad Love; Seo In-guk, Jung Eun-ji (Apink) - All For You	
1	April 4	Hong Hyun-hee, Jaejae	Country Kko Kko - Gimme! Gimme! Jung In - Uphill Road; After School - Diva	
2	April 11	Choi Ye-bin, Jo Soo-min, Kim Hyun-soo	Jodi Benson - Part of Your World; S.E.S. - I'm Your Girl; IU ft. Kim Chang-wan - Your Meaning	
2	April 11	Lee Seung-chul, Kim Se-jeong	Lee Seung-chul - My Love; Country Kko Kko - Gimme! Gimme! Nam Jin, Jang Yoon-jeong - I Like You; Na Hoon-a - At Any Time; Lee Seung-chul - We Were (Prod. by Lee Chan-hyuk (AKMU)); Kim Se-jeong - Warning	
3	April 18	Brave Girls	Brave Girls - Rollin'; Lim Jeong-hee - Tears Wouldn't Fall; Sistar - Alone; Brave Girls - We Ride; Psy - Entertainer	
3	April 18	Jang Hang-jun, Jang Sung-kyu, Jang Do-yeon	Louis Armstrong - What a Wonderful World; Yoon Yeo-gyu - After; Hwang Kyu-young - I Have No Problem	
4	April 25	Gummy, Lee Seung-yoon, Lee Mu-jin	Han Young-ae - Is Anyone There; Park Jin-young - Honey; 4 Non Blondes - What's Up; Sting - Englishman in New York; Brave Girls - Rollin'; Lady Gaga, Bradley Cooper - Shallow; Lee Moon-sae - A Little Girl; Gummy - Childish Adult; Gummy - You Are My Everything	
4	April 25	Jessi	Tones and I - Dance Monkey; Jessi - What Type of X Yoon Mi-rae - Memories; Shim Soo-bong - That Person of That Time	
5	May 2	Kim Hwan, Do Kyung-wan, Cho Jung-sik	Yim Jae-beom - The Flight; Vibe - Love Me Once Again	
5	May 2	Itzy	Twice - Dance the Night Away; Shawn Mendes, Camila Cabello - I Know What You Did Last Summer; Itzy - Mafia in the Morning	
6 (Note: Kyuhyun is absent)	May 9	Hur Jae, Heo Ung, Heo Hoon	Lee Seung-chul - Girl's Generation; Jatanpung - Me to You, You to Me; Park Myung-soo - Prince of the Sea	
6	May 9	Jang Hang-jun, Jang Hyun-sung, Kim Jin-soo	Park Jin-young - Swing Baby; Shin Seung-hun - I Believe; Song Chang-sik - Tobacco Shop Lady; 015B - Goodbye Now	
7	May 16	Baek Ji-young, Sung Si-kyung	Sung Si-kyung - Two People; Baek Ji-young - That Woman; AKMU - How Can I Love The Heartbreak, You're The One I Love; Baek Ji-young - Don't Forget Me; Sung Si-kyung - Every Moment Of You; Whitney Houston - Greatest Love of All; Lee Moon-sae - Farewell Story	
8	May 23	Kim Yeon-ja, Lee Seok-hoon (SG Wannabe)	SG Wannabe - Lalala; Kim Yeon-ja - Bling Bling; Kim Yeon-ja - Mercury Lamp; Cho Hang-jo - Thank You; Lee Hi - Breathe; Yim Jae-beom - For You; The Righteous Brothers - Unchained Melody; Lee Seok-hoon - You Were You	
9	May 30	Kim Jung-min, Jung Hong-il, Lee Hong-gi (F.T. Island)	Kim Jung-min - Sad Promise; The Clovers - Love Potion No. 9 Sinawe - Turn Up the Radio; Yim Jae-beom - Confession; Kim Jung-min - To You; Yoon Jong-shin - Like It	
9	May 30	Kim Seung-woo, Oh Ha-young (Apink)	Rumble Fish - Rain and You; The Blue - Feeling Only You; Lee Moon-sae - I Am A Happy Man; Sechs Kies - Couple	
10	June 5	Bong Tae-gyu. Jo Se-ho	V.One - That May Be So... Shin Sung-woo - Seoshi; Eagles - Desperado g.o.d - Love and Remember	
10	June 5	Mamamoo	Mamamoo - Um Oh Ah Yeh, You're The Best, Décalcomanie, Starry Night, Hip; Beyoncé - Irreplaceable; Pokémon Korean OST; Ariana Grande - Almost Is Never Enough (with Nathan Sykes); Mamamoo - Where Are We Now	
11	June 12	Kim Soo-mi	Nam Jin - Nest; Yim Jae-beom - Confession; Baek Seol-hee - Spring Days Will Be Gone; Cho Yong-pil - Woman of A Mountain Villa	
11	June 12	Lee Sang-woo	Lim Jong-hwan - I Just Walked; Buzz - Don't Know Man	
12	June 19	Eugene	BTS - Boy with Luv; Naomi Scott - Speechless; Eugene - Cha Cha	
12	June 19	Ha Dong-kyun, LYn, Kim Feel	LYn - My Destiny, Back in Time, Want To Be Free; Kim Feel - Someday, The Boy; Kim Feel (ft. Kim Chang-wan) - Youth; Deulgukhwa - That's Only My World; BTS - The Truth Unfold; Lee So-ra - Track 3 Lee So-ra + Park Hyo-shin - It's Gonna Be Rolling	

== Ratings ==
- The table below show the highest rating received in red, and the lowest rating in blue each year.
- The show will be aired in two parts. Only the higher rating of the two parts of each episode will be shown.

=== 2021 ===
Ep. #	Original Airdate	Nielsen Korea Ratings Nationwide
1	April 4	3.9%
2	April 11	3.4%
3	April 18	3.0%
4	April 25	3.4%
5	May 2	3.6%
6	May 9	3.8%
7	May 16	2.8%
8	May 23	4.3%
9	May 30	3.5%
10	June 5	3.0%
11	June 12	3.4%
12	June 19	3.3%
