= Gong Hyung-jin =

South Korean actor (born 1969)

- Born: April 10, 1969 (age 57); Gangbuk-gu, Seoul, South Korea
- Other name: Kong Hyung-jin
- Education: Chung-Ang University - Theater and Film
- Occupation: Actor
- Years active: 1990–present
- Agent: Nest Management (네스트매니지먼트)

Korean name
- Hangul: 공형진
- RR: Gong Hyeongjin
- MR: Kong Hyŏngjin

Gong Hyung-jin (Korean: 공형진; born April 10, 1969) is a South Korean actor. While best known as a supporting actor notably in Taegukgi, Liar, Marrying the Mafia II and Alone in Love, Gong has also played leading roles in North Korean Guys and Life Is Beautiful.

== Filmography ==
=== Film ===
- Well, Let's Look at the Sky Sometimes (1990)
- Life Isn't a Multiple Choice Test (1991)
- I Want to Live Just Until 20 Years Old (1992)
- Goodbye Seoul Shinpa (1993)
- Love in the Rain (1994)
- A Growing Business (1999)
- Peppermint Candy (2000)
- The Legend of Gingko (2000)
- Why Do I Want to Be a Boxing Referee? (short film, 2000)
- Last Present (2001)
- Failan (2001)
- Out of Justice (2001)
- My Beautiful Girl, Mari (2002)
- Oh! Lala Sisters (2002)
- Over the Rainbow (2002) (cameo)
- Surprise Party (2002) (cameo)
- A Perfect Match (2002)
- Wet Dreams (2002) (cameo)
- Blue (2003)
- Star (2003) (cameo)
- Love Impossible (2003)
- Oh! Brothers (2003) (cameo)
- The Greatest Expectation (2003) (cameo)
- My Daddy (short film, 2003)
- North Korean Guys (2003)
- Taegukgi (2004) as Yong-man
- Liar (2004)
- Everybody Has Secrets (2004) (cameo)
- Marrying the Mafia II (2005)
- Mr. Housewife (Quiz King) (2005)
- Barefoot Ki-bong (2006) (cameo)
- Marrying the Mafia III (2006)
- Yobi, the Five Tailed Fox (2007)
- Life Is Beautiful (2008)
- Like You Know It All (2009)
- Good Morning President (2009) (cameo)
- The Servant (2010)
- Couples (2011)
- Roman Holiday (2017)

=== Television series ===
- Queen (SBS, 1991)
- Lovers (MBC, 2001)
- You're Not Alone (SBS, 2004)
- Alone in Love (SBS, 2006)
- Dal-ja's Spring (KBS2, 2007)
- Saranghae (I Love You) (SBS, 2008)
- Star's Lover (SBS, 2008) (cameo, episode 1)
- The Slave Hunters (KBS2, 2010)
- The Fugitive: Plan B (KBS2, 2010)
- The Duo (MBC, 2011)
- My Husband Got a Family (KBS2, 2012) (cameo)
- Totally Her (E-Channel, 2012)
- All About My Romance (SBS, 2013)
- Basketball (tvN, 2013)
- Angel Eyes (SBS, 2014)
- Everybody Say Kimchi (MBC, 2014) (cameo)
- Righteous Love (tvN, 2014) (cameo)
- Let's Eat 2 (tvN 2015) cameo
- Last (jTBC, 2015)
- A Beautiful Mind (KBS2, 2016)

=== Variety/radio show ===
- X-Man (SBS, 2004–2005)
- Cine Town with Gong Hyung-jin (SBS Power FM, 2009–2015)
- King of Mask Singer – "Merchant in Venice" (MBC, 2015)
- Sunday Night – "Enjoy Today" (SBS, 2010–2011)
- Taxi (tvN, 2009–2012)
- Entertainment in TV (TV Chosun, 2011)
- Actor Pop Star (SBS, 2012)
- Appeal (MBC Every 1, 2012)
- Fantasy Girl (tvN, 2013)
- A Celebrity Is Living in Our House (MBC Every 1, 2014)

== Theater ==
- Kleopatra (2009)
- Defending the Caveman (2009–2010)
- Hairspray (2012)

== Discography ==
- "Prosecutor Bong's Proposal", "I Always Miss You 2005" (Gong Hyung-jin; Marrying the Mafia II OST; 2005)
- "We" (Gong Hyung-jin, Kim Seung-woo, Lee Ha-na, Jang Dong-gun, Ji Jin-hee and Hwang Jung-min; single; 2010)
- "Do It For You" (The One feat. Gong Hyung-jin, Suho and Ko Woo-ri; 2011)
- "Our Love Shines" (Kim Joo-hyuk, Lee Si-young, Gong Hyung-jin, Lee Yoon-ji and Oh Jung-se; Couples OST; 2011)

== Awards and nominations ==
| Year | Award | Category | Nominated work | Result |
|---|---|---|---|---|
| 2002 | 3rd Busan Film Critics Awards | Best Supporting Actor | A Perfect Match | Won |
| 2002 | 23rd Blue Dragon Film Awards | Best Supporting Actor | A Perfect Match | Nominated |
| 2004 | 41st Grand Bell Awards | Best Supporting Actor | North Korean Guys | Nominated |
| 2004 | 25th Blue Dragon Film Awards | Best Supporting Actor | Taegukgi | Nominated |
| 2005 | 26th Blue Dragon Film Awards | Best Supporting Actor | Marrying the Mafia II | Nominated |
| 2006 | SBS Drama Awards | Best Supporting Actor in a Miniseries | Alone in Love | Won |
| 2007 | KBS Drama Awards | Best Supporting Actor | Dal-ja's Spring | Nominated |
