= Park Sang-wook (actor) =

South Korean actor

- Born: January 18, 1976 (age 50); South Korea
- Education: Korea University - Newspaper and Broadcasting
- Occupation: Actor
- Years active: 1997–present
- Agent: Namoo Actors

Korean name
- Hangul: 박상욱
- Hanja: 朴相旭
- RR: Bak Sanguk
- MR: Pak Sanguk

Park Sang-wook (born January 18, 1976) is a South Korean actor.

== Filmography ==
=== Film ===
Year	Title	Role
2002	No Comment	Driver killer (segment: "Enemies in Four Directions")
2002	Marrying the Mafia	Jang Kyeong-tae
2003	Mr. Butterfly	Sergeant Choi
2003	North Korean Guys	Detective Park
2005	Another Public Enemy	Kang Suk-shin
2005	The Twins	Hee-man
2006	The Restless	Yeo-wi
2007	Punch Lady	Kwak Joo-chang
2009	Where is Jung Seung-pil	Detective 3
2010	No Mercy	Park Pyung-sik
2012	Return of the Mafia	Jang Kyeong-tae
2013	Running Man	Beard (cameo)
2019	The Bad Guys: Reign of Chaos	Kim Chang-sik

=== Television series ===
Year	Title	Role
1997	Hometown Legends "A Mother Sow"	Geolgwi Pyeon
2001	Like Father, Unlike Son	Gu Sung-chul
2003	Scent of a Man	Deul-jwi
2004	The End of the World and the Last Killer	
2008	Hong Gil-dong	Shim Soo-geun
2008	Love House	Il-doo
2008	The Kingdom of the Winds	Gwi-yoo
2010	Legend of the Patriots	Baek Seung-jin
2012	God of War	Lee Gong-ju
2012	KBS Drama Special: "Do I Look Like a Pushover?"	Lee Chang-ho
2013	Iris II: New Generation	Chinese arms dealer (episodes 1, 17)
2014	Healer	Bae Sang-soo
