= Invincible Baseball Team =

2009–2010 South Korean TV series

- Genre: Variety, sports
- Country of origin: South Korea
- Original language: Korean

Production
- Running time: Approximately 85 minutes

Original release
- Network: KBS2
- Release: 25 April 2009 – 25 December 2010

Invincible Baseball Team

Current uniforms
Home	Away

Invincible Baseball Team (Korean: 천하무적 야구단; Hanja: 天下無敵野球團) is a South Korean TV baseball-variety show that debuted on 25 April 2009 on KBS2. Invincible Baseball Team ended in December 2010.

== Cast ==
=== Players and coaches ===
- Lee Ha-neul
- Kim Sung-soo
- Kim Dong-hee
- Kim Chang-ryeol
- Han Min-kwan
- Oh Ji-ho
- Tak Jae-hoon
- Im Hyung-joon
- Lee Hyun-bae
- Mario
- Shin Dong-ho
- Kim Hyeon-cheol
- Jun Kim
- Jobin
- Lee Kyung-pil (Base running, pitching coach)
- Baek Ji-young (Manager)
- Kim Seong-han (Technical advisor and commentator)
- Kim In-sik (General Director)

=== Supporters ===
- Hong Jin-young
- Soyeon (T-ara)
- Sujeong Lee
- Seungha Lee
- Noarang
- JB
- NS Yoon-ji
- Aurora
- Eunji (Nine Muses)

== Awards and nominations ==
Ceremony	Year	Category	Recipient	Result	Ref.
KBS Entertainment Awards	2009	Best Teamwork	Invincible Baseball Team	Won	
KBS Entertainment Awards	2009	Best Entertainer	Lee Ha-neul	Won	
National Sports Association Competition	2009	Achievement plaque	Invincible Baseball Team	Won	
Korea Baseball Softball Association	2009	Ambassador plaque	Invincible Baseball Team	Won	
