= Marrying the Mafia =

- Poster for Marrying the Mafia
- Hangul: 가문의 영광
- Hanja: 家門의 榮光
- RR: Gamunui yeonggwang
- MR: Kamunŭi yŏnggwang
- Directed by: Jeong Heung-sun
- Written by: Jeong Heung-sun
- Produced by: Chung Tae-won
- Starring: Jung Joon-ho; Kim Jung-eun; Yoo Dong-geun
- Cinematography: Kim Yun-su
- Edited by: Ko Im-pyo
- Music by: Park Jeong-hyeon
- Production company: Taewon Entertainment
- Distributed by: Cinema Service
- Release date: September 13, 2002
- Running time: 113 minutes
- Country: South Korea
- Language: Korean
- Box office: US$28.9 million

Marrying the Mafia (Korean: 가문의 영광; lit. "Family's Honor") is a 2002 South Korean film released on September 13, 2002, and the first installment of the Marrying the Mafia series.

The film sold 5,200,000 tickets, becoming South Korea's 14th highest ticket-selling film. For the year of 2002, it was the highest-attended South Korean film, and the second highest-attended film (including international productions) in South Korea with 5,021,001 admissions nationwide.

== Plot ==
The film is a gangster comedy about a businessman who becomes involved with the gangster underworld through the daughter of a crime boss.

A businessman and a young woman wake up in bed together with no knowledge of how they got there. Next, the businessman is confronted by the young woman's brothers, who are members of the mafias. The brothers demand that the businessman make an honorable woman of their sister.

== Cast ==
- Jung Joon-ho as Park Dae-seo
- Kim Jung-eun as Jang Jin-gyeong
- Yoo Dong-geun as Jang In-tae (Jin-gyeong's brother)
- Sung Ji-ru as Jang Seok-tae (Jin-gyeong's brother)
- Park Sang-wook as Jang Gyeong-tae (Jin-gyeong's brother)
- Park Geun-hyung as Jang Jeong-jong (Jin-gyeong's father)
- Jin Hee-kyung as Won Hye-suk

== English vocal cast ==
- John Gremillion as Park Dae-sun
- Shelley Calene-Black as Jang Jin-gyeong
- Chris Ayres as Jang Jung-jong
- John Swasey as Jang In-tae
- Rob Mungle as Jang Seok-tae
- Mike MacRae as Jang Gyeong-tae
- Jessica Boone as Lee Yoo-jin
- Celeste Roberts as Mi-soon
- Nancy Novotny as Won Hae-sook
- Jason Douglas as Sang-pal
- Andy McAvin as Dae-seo's Father
- Jennie Welch as Dae-seo's Mother
- Illich Guardiola as Manager
- Vic Mignogna as Yeo Min-seok
- Kim Prause as Jin-gyeong's Friend
- Max Issacson as Jang Young-min
- David Born as Lawyer
- Ty Mahany as Dae-seo's Friend A
- Quinton Haag as Dae-seo's Friend B
- Rachel Buchman as School Violence Mother
- Rebekay Dahl as Yoo-jin's Mentor
- Nam as Ty Mahany
- David Born as TV Host Male
- Kim Prause as TV Host Female
- David Born as Security Guard
- Ty Mahany as Radio DJ
- Kim Prause as Hostess A
- Nancy Novotny as Hostess B
- Rebekay Dahl as Hostess C

English language and subtitled versions were presented by ADV Films.

== Reception ==
G. Allen Johnson of the San Francisco Chronicle said that "[the film is] a comedy that tries too hard to be funny, therefore it isn't".

Sean Axmaker of the Seattle Post-Intelligencer said that "[the film's] unusual cultural details add a little color to the usual romantic turbulence, but it's otherwise as rote as its American counterparts".

== See also ==
- Marrying the Mafia II
- Marrying the Mafia III
- Marrying the Mafia IV
- Marrying the Mafia V (Return of the Mafia)

== Sources ==
- Leong, Anthony (2003). "Marrying the Mafia Movie Review". mediacircus.net.
