= Sunday Night (South Korean TV program) =

South Korean television series

- Genre: Variety show
- Starring: King of Mask Singer; Gim Seong-ju
- Country of origin: South Korea
- Original language: Korean
- No. of episodes: 1419

Production
- Running time: 175 minutes

Original release
- Network: MBC
- Release: March 29, 1981 – present

Sunday Night (Korean: 일밤; RR: Ilbam) is the longest-running South Korean television entertainment programme airing on MBC. It runs for 175 minutes, including roughly fifteen minutes of advertising. Previously named Big March of Sunday Night (일요일 밤의 대행진; Iryoil bamui daehaengjin) when it debuted in 1981, and changing its name to Sunday Sunday Night (일요일 일요일 밤에; Iryoil iryoil bame) in 1988, in March 2011, the show has changed its name for the second time in its history in an effort to increase its popularity again at the 5:20PM timeslot, with its rival contenders, KBS2's Happy Sunday and SBS's Good Sunday. As of April 29, 2012, the name was once again changed to its most commonly known abbreviation, Sunday Night (일밤).

== Broadcasting times ==
Big March of Sunday Night

- March 29, 1981 – November 20, 1988 (21:00 – 22:00/22:00-23:00; 1 hour)

Sunday Sunday Night

- November 27, 1988 - Later half of 1999 (18:00 – 19:00; 1 hour)
- Later half of 1999 – 2004 (18:00 – 19:55; 1 hour 55 minutes)
- 2004 – 2006 (17:40 – 19:55; 2 hours 15 minutes)
- 2006 – May 20, 2007 (17:30 – 19:55; 2 hours 25 minutes)
- May 27, 2007 – February 20, 2011 (17:20 – 19:55; 2 hours 35 minutes)
  - May 27, 2007 – February 20, 2011 (17:20 – 18:40; 1 hour 20 minutes; Part 1)
  - May 27, 2007 – February 20, 2011 (18:40 – 19:55; 1 hour 15 minutes; Part 2)

Our Sunday Night

- March 6 – August 21, 2011 (17:20 – 19:55; 2 hours 35 minutes)
- August 28, 2011 – April 22, 2012 (17:10 – 19:55; 2 hours 45 minutes)
  - August 28, 2011 – April 22, 2012 (17:10 – 18:00; 50 minutes; Part 1)
  - August 28, 2011 – April 22, 2012 (18:00 – 19:55; 1 hour 55 minutes; Part 2)

Sunday Night

- April 29, 2012 – October 14, 2012 (17:10 – 19:55; 2 hours 45 minutes)
  - April 29 – October 7, 2012 (17:10 – 18:20; 1 hour 10 minutes; Part 1)
  - April 29 – October 7, 2012 (18:20 – 19:55; 1 hour 35 minutes; Part 2)
- October 21, 2012 – present (17:00 – 19:55; 2 hours 55 minutes)
  - December 2, 2012 – present (17:00 – 18:35; 1 hour 35 minutes; Part 1)
  - December 2, 2012 – present (18:35 – 19:55; 1 hour 20 minutes; Part 2)

== Current segments ==
=== King of Mask Singer ===
- Starring: Various singers

King of Mask Singer (복면가왕) is a mystery music show featuring several celebrities to compete in singing competition while given elaborate masks to wear in order to conceal their identity, thus removing factors such as popularity, career and age that could lead to prejudiced voting. The winners of each pair are selected by the audience and panel of judges through instant live votes. The names of contestants are not revealed unless they have been eliminated. The show debuted on April 5, 2015, replacing Animals.

== Previous segments ==
A few of the many segments shown on Sunday Night.

=== Dunia: Into a New World ===
- Starring: Don Spike, Yunho (TVXQ), Austin Kang, Sam Okyere, Jung Hye-sung, DinDin, Koo Ja-sung, Han Seul, Kwon Hyun-bin, Luda (Cosmic Girls), Joon Park (g.o.d), Mijoo (Lovelyz)

Dunia: Into a New World (Korean: 두니아 처음 만난 세계) replaced Wizard of Nowhere and broadcast from June 3 to September 23, 2018.

=== Wizard of Nowhere ===
- Starring: Kim Tae-won, Kim Soo-ro, Yoon Jung-soo, Um Ki-joon, Choi Min-yong, Kim Jin-woo (WINNER) and guests.

Wizard of Nowhere (오지의 마법사) premiered as pilots on June 5, June 17 – July 1, 2017, then replaced All Broadcasts of the World and officially broadcast from July 30, 2017, to May 27, 2018.

=== All Broadcasts of the World ===
- Starring: Song Hae, Heo Cham, Lee Sang-byuk, Im Baek-cheon, Park Myeong-su, Park Soo-hong

All Broadcasts of the World (세모방: 세상의 모든 방송) replaced Secretly Greatly and broadcast from May 28 to July 23, 2017. Since July 29, 2017, the program was changed the broadcast timeline to Saturday night.

=== Secretly Greatly ===
- Starring: Yoon Jong-shin, Lee Soo-geun, Kim Hee-chul, Lee Guk-joo, John Park

Secretly Greatly (은밀하게 위대하게), also known as Hidden Camera season 3, a new corner related with Hidden Camera starred by Lee Kyung-kyu, a former program to surprise Korean celebrities in various situations, without any notice from the host and its producers. The show debuted on December 4, 2016, replacing Real Men. The last episode was broadcast on May 21, 2017.

=== Real Men ===
- Starring: Kim Soo-ro, Seo Kyung-suk, Sam Hammington, Park Gun-hyung, Chun Jung-myung, K.Will and Henry Lau. Former cast members who have left the show are Mir, Ryu Soo-young, Son Jin-young, Jang Hyuk, and Park Hyung-sik.

Real Men (진짜 사나이) is a reality show featuring seven male celebrities as they experience a week in the army. The show debuted on April 14, 2013, replacing This is Magic. The last episode of season 2 aired on November 27, 2016.

=== Animals ===
- Starring: Park Joon-hyung, Kwon Yuri, Eunhyuk, Seo Jang-hoon, Yoon Do-hyun, Jang Dong-min, Kim Jun-hyun, KangNam, Jo Jae-yoon, Kwak Dong-yeon and Don Spike.

Animals (애니멀즈) is a variety show featuring eleven celebrities living with a variety of animals. The show debuted on January 25, replacing Dad! Where Are We Going? and ended on March 29, 2015.

=== Dad! Where Are We Going? ===
- Starring: Kim Sung-joo (and Kim Min-kook), Sung Dong-il (and Sung Jun), Lee Jong-hyuk (and Lee Joon-soo), Song Chong-gug (and Song Ji-ah), and Vibe member Yoon Min-soo (and Yoon Hoo). Lee Jong-hyuk and Song Chong-gug (and their children) left the show after season 1, and were replaced in season 2 by Ryu Jin (and Im Chan-hyung), Ahn Jung-hwan (and Ahn Ri-hwan), and Kim Jin-pyo (and Kim Gyu-won). Later in the season, Kim Jin-pyo left and was replaced by Jung Woong-in (and Jung Se-yoon).

Dad! Where Are We Going? (아빠! 어디가?) is a reality show featuring five fathers and their children as they travel to rural places. The show debuted on January 6, 2013, and ended on January 18, 2015.

=== This Is Magic ===
- Starring: Park Myung-soo, Jeong Jun-ha, Park Ji-yoon, Choi Hyun-woo
- Executive Producers: Kwon Suk, Kyung Myung-chul, Park Jae-sam
- Production Company: Celltrion Entertainment (formerly Dream E&M)

Magic Concert This is Magic (매직콘서트 이것이 마술이다) is a magic performance show, showcasing world-famous magicians as they compete with Korean magicians. The show debuted on December 2, 2012, and ended on April 7, 2013.

=== I Am a Singer 2 ===
- Starring: Various Singers

I Am a Singer 2 (나는 가수다 2) is a singing competition featuring twelve artists that are judged by an ordinary citizen panel of 500 as well as viewers at home. The singer who places 7th (last) for that month's competition and the first place singer is eliminated from the show, and is replaced by another artist the following competition. The show debuted on April 29 and ended on December 30, 2012.

=== God of Victory ===
- Starring: Kim Yong-man, Tak Jae-hoon, Kim Soo-ro, Noh Hong-chul, Kim Na-young, Lee Jae-yoon, Kim Jae-kyung (Rainbow)

God of Victory (승부의 신) is a spin-off of Infinite Challenge's Ha-ha vs. Hong-chul special, where two celebrities face off in ten rounds of competitions, and viewers must guess who will win all ten rounds to win prizes. The show debuted on August 19 and ended on November 25, 2012.

=== Exploration of Genders ===
- Starring: Oh Man-seok, Kang Dong-ho, Brian, Chun-ji (Teen Top), Jeong Jun-ha, Choi Song-hyun, Yoon Jung-hee, Jung Sun-hee, Shin Bong-sun, Jung Eun-ji

Gender Communication Project Exploration of Genders (남녀소통 프로젝트 남심여심) is a variety show where male and female celebrities switch roles and explore the lives of the opposite gender. The show debuted on March 18 and ended on June 10, 2012.

=== Dreams and Fields ===
- Starring: Ji Sang-ryul, Kim Tae-hyun, Lee Kyung-shil, Jung Ju-ri, Ahn Sun-young, Choi Jung-yoon, Lee Joon

Hometown Variety Dreams and Fields (고향 버라이어티 꿈엔들) is a variety show that goes to rural areas of the country and films a music video promoting them. The show debuted on March 18 and ended on April 15, 2012.

=== I Am a Singer ===
- Starring: Yoon Jong-shin

Survival I Am a Singer (서바이벌 나는 가수다) is a singing competition featuring seven artists that are judged by an ordinary citizen panel of 500. The singer who places 7th (last) for that week's competition is eliminated from the show, and is replaced by another artist the following competition. The show debuted on March 6, 2011, and ended its first season on February 19, 2012.

=== Lulu Lala ===
- Starring: Kim Gun-mo, Kim Yong-man, Ji Sang-ryul, Jung Hyung-don, Cho PD, Kim Shin-young, Park Gyu-ri, G.NA, Bang Yong-guk

Music Variety Lulu Lala (뮤직 버라이어티 룰루랄라) is a music-healing variety show, a second season of Carried By The Wind. The show debuted on December 11, 2011, and ended on February 19, 2012.

=== Carried By The Wind ===
- Starring: Im Jae-bum, Kim Young-ho, Lee Joon-hyuk, Ji Sang-ryul, Nuck Up-shan, Lee Ho-jun, Ha Kwang-hun

Carried By The Wind (바람에 실려) is a road music variety show, with the cast travelling through the United States to showcase and understand music. The show debuted on October 2 and ended on December 4, 2011.

=== New Recruit ===
- Starring: Oh Sang-jin, Moon Ji-ae, Song Jung-eun, Jo Hyung-ki, Jung Hyung-don, Gil, Simon Dominic

New Recruit (신입사원) is an audition program for announcers as part of MBC's 50th anniversary. The show debuted on March 6 and ended on June 26, 2011.

=== Hot Brothers ===
- Starring: Park Myung-su, Kim Gu-ra, Tak Jae-hoon, Simon Dominic, Lee Gi-kwang, Han Sang-jin, Park Hwi-soon, No Yoo-min, Tony An

HOT BROTHERS (Korea: 뜨거운 형제들) debuted on March 28, 2010.

=== Enjoy Today ===
- Starring: Jung Joon-ho, Jung Hyung-don, Kim Hyun-chul, Shin Hyun-joon, Seung-ri, Leeteuk, Gong Hyung-jin, Seo Ji-seok

Enjoy Today (오늘을 즐겨라) was a program about enjoying the little pleasures in life. A book were to be made of how to enjoy life at the end of the run, but the program was cancelled due to extremely low rating.

=== Danbi ===
- Starring: Kim Yong-man, Jung Hyung-don, Kim Hyun-chul, Ahn Young-mi, Yoon Doo-joon

Only One Secret Danbi (단 하나의 비밀 단비) was a reality and variety show about celebrities doing charity work in countries that need help. The show debuted on December 6, 2009.

=== Our Father ===
- Starring: Shin Dong-yup, Kim Gu-ra, Hwang Jung-eum, Jung Ga-eun

Our Father (우리 아버지) was about cheering up fathers who work hard for their family. The show debuted on December 6, 2009.

=== We Got Married ===
We Got Married (우리 결혼했어요) featured various celebrities matched as married couples. The show aired from March 16, 2008, to May 6, 2017.

=== Hunters ===
- Starring: Lee Hwi-jae, Kim Hyun-joong, Shin Jung-hwan, Park Jun-gyu, Kim Tae-woo, Jung Yong-hwa, Chun Myung-hoon, Goo Hara, Wu Seung-min, Shim Gwan-ho

Korean Nature Safeguards Hunters (대한민국 생태구조단 헌터스) was about protecting farms from wild boars and hunting them. The show debuted on December 6, 2009.

=== Oppa Band ===
- Starring: Shin Dong-yup, Tak Jae-hoon, Kim Gu-ra, Yu Young-suk, Lee Sung-min, Kim Jung-mo, Seo In-young, Hong Kyung-min

Oppa Band (오빠밴드) was a reality show about the creation of a band. The show debuted on June 21, 2009, and was cancelled after 18 episodes.

=== Rich Artifacts ===
- Starring: Kim Je-dong, Shin Jung-hwan, Lee Sung-jin, Jae-bum, Jo Hye-ryun, Kim Na-young, Hwangbo, Nicole Jung, Jun Jong-hwan, Choi Min-yong, Kim Tae-hyun

Rich Artifacts (노다지) was about the history and culture of South Korea. The show debuted on August 23, 2009, and was cancelled after 9 episodes due to extremely low ratings.

=== Quiz Prince ===
- Starring: Kim Yong-man, Tak Jae-hoon, Kim Gu-ra, Shin Dong-yup, Shin Jung-hwan, Lee Hyuk-jae

Quiz Prince (퀴즈프린스) was a typical quiz show with the punishment of falling into a pool of bubbles. The show debuted on May 3, 2009, and was cancelled after 6 episodes due to extremely low ratings.

=== Girls' Generation's Horror Movie Production Centre ===
- Starring: Girls' Generation, Jo Hye-ryun, Yoo Se-yoon, Kim Shin-young

Girls' Generation's Horror Movie Production Centre (소녀시대의 공포영화 제작소) debuted on May 3, 2009. The show was cancelled after 6 episodes due to low ratings.

=== Great Hope ===
- Starring: Kim Yong-man, Tak Jae-hoon, Kim Gu-ra, Yoon Son-ha, Shin Jung-hwan, Lee Hyuk-jae

Great Hope (대단한 희망) was a reality show on the lives of MCs. The show debuted on March 29, 2009, and was cancelled after 4 episodes due to extremely low ratings.

=== Quiz to Change the World ===
- Starring: Park Mi-sun, Lee Hwi-jae, Kim Gu-ra

Quiz to Change the World (세상을 바꾸는 퀴즈) combines quizzes and talk shows into a variety show for all ages. The show has been moved to Saturday nights starting April 4, 2009.

=== Hidden Camera ===
- Starring: Lee Kyung-kyu

Hidden Camera (몰래카메라) was a program to surprise Korean celebrities in various situations, without any notice from the host and its producers.

=== Let's Play Economy ===
- Starring: Kim Yong-man, Jo Hyung-ki, Oh Sang-jin

Let's Play Economy (경제야 놀자) was a program that aims for viewers to become more friendly with economics. To do that, they introduce a technical way of finance to boost the assets each week. Moreover, they visit a house of Korean celebrities each week and estimate some of the antiques and supplies of them.

=== Baby Face Club ===
- Starring: Lee Hwi-jae, Park Myung-soo, Jung Hyung-don

Baby Face Club (동안클럽) was a medical quiz show to improve the general knowledge to protect the health condition by solving quizzes. 4 teams (Roughly 10 people) of Korean entertainers invited to challenge for the prize of free health-check voucher to the winning team every week.

== See also ==
- KBS2 Happy Sunday
- SBS Good Sunday
