= Marrying the Mafia IV =

- Film poster
- Hangul: 가문의 영광 4 - 가문의 수난
- Hanja: 家門의 榮光 4 - 家門의 受難
- RR: Gamunui yeonggwang 4 - gamunui sunan
- MR: Kamunŭi yŏnggwang 4 - kamunŭi sunan
- Directed by: Jung Tae-won
- Written by: Kim Young-chan
- Produced by: Jung Jae-hee; Jang Kyung-ik; Kim Jong-hyun; Baek Jin-dong
- Starring: Shin Hyun-joon; Kim Soo-mi; Tak Jae-hoon
- Cinematography: Kim Chun-suk
- Edited by: Kim Chang-ju; Steve M. Choe
- Distributed by: Next Entertainment World
- Release date: September 8, 2011
- Running time: 103 minutes
- Country: South Korea
- Language: Korean

Marrying the Mafia IV (Korean: 가문의 영광 4 - 가문의 수난) is a 2011 South Korean film, and the fourth installment of the Marrying the Mafia series.

== Plot ==
Hong Deok-ja continues to run a kimchi food company and leaves for Japan on a business trip with three sons. However, when bank robbers steals their money, the family is separated from their guide, and a misunderstanding between language barriers makes the White Tiger family think that they are wanted by the cops.

== Cast ==
- Kim Soo-mi as Hong Deok-ja
- Shin Hyun-joon as Jang In-jae
- Tak Jae-hoon as Jang Seok-jae
- Im Hyung-joon as Jang Gyeong-jae
- Jeong Jun-ha as Jong-myeon
- Hyun Young as Hyo-jung
- Kim Ji-woo as Mori
- Jung Woong-in as Hyun-joon
- Jung Man-sik
- Yuko Fueki as Japanese announcer (cameo)

== See also ==
- Marrying the Mafia
- Marrying the Mafia II
- Marrying the Mafia III
- Marrying the Mafia V (Return of the Mafia)
