= Tak Jae-hoon =

South Korean singer, actor and entertainer

- 탁재훈
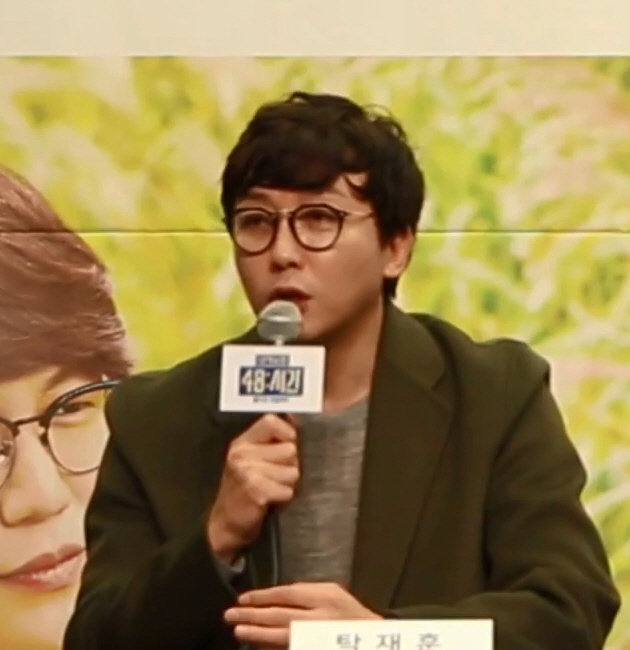
- Tak in December 2016
- Born: Bae Sung-woo; 24 July 1968 (age 58); Seoul, South Korea
- Other name: S.Papa
- Occupations: Singer; actor; television presenter
- Agent: Pan Stars Company
- Musical career
- Genre: Dance pop
- Instruments: Vocals, Guitar
- Years active: 1990–2013, 2016–present

Korean name
- Hangul: 배성우
- Hanja: 裵晟佑
- RR: Bae Seongu
- MR: Pae Sŏngu

Stage name
- Hangul: 탁재훈
- RR: Tak Jaehun
- MR: T'ak Chaehun

Bae Sung-woo (Korean: 배성우; born 24 July 1968), better known by his stage name Tak Jae-hoon (탁재훈), is a South Korean singer, actor and entertainer. He first became known for being part of K-pop group Country Kko Kko. He has since made a career as an entertainer on South Korean variety shows.

== Discography ==
=== Albums ===
Title	Album details
내가 선택한길 (The Path I Chose)	Released: 24 August 1995; Track listing: 1. Prologue (독백); 2. 너에게 나를 To You I Am; 3. 내가 선택한 길 The Path I Chose; 4. 지난 추억 그리고 기다림 Past Memories and Waiting; 5. 천사를 부수고 Break an Angel; 6. 나의 꿈은 My Dream Is; 7. 이별이란 Farewell; 8. 고독 Loneliness
Rebirth	Released: December 1996; Track listing: 1. 알았다 Okay; 2. 돌아와 Come Back; 3. 이ㆍ별ㆍ도ㆍ시 Parting City; 4. 백수의 하루 Day of an Unemployed; 5. 1:2; 6. 보이지 않는 인사 Invisible Greeting; 7. 너를 기다리는 이유 Reason to Wait; 8. 아껴둔 사랑 Precious Love; 9. 페어플레이 Fairplay
Rebeginning Story	Released: 7 December 2004; Track listing: 1. Lady; 2. 참 다행이야 Thank You so Much; 3. My Girl (another ver.); 4. Love Is Wonderful Thing (ft. JK Kim Dong-wook); 5. 애증 Love and Hate; 6. 사랑했다 I Loved You; 7. 마지막 키스 (베사메무쵸) Last Kiss (Besame Mucho); 8. Super Star; 9. 상처 Wound; 10. 착한 사람 Nice Person; 11. 됐어 Done; 12. My Girl; 13. 사랑은... Love Is...

=== Singles ===
Title	Year	Album	Notes
"Mother" (어머니)	2006	Barefoot Ki-bong OST	film soundtrack
"I Need Your Love" (with Kim Jong-min and Nine Muses)	2012	Music and Lyrics - Season 2 OST	collaboration - variety show
"Vaguely" (멍하나)	2014	Vaguely (멍하나)	single album
"The Best Hit" (최고의 한방) (with Kim Soo-mi, Lee Sang-min and Jang Dong-min)	2019	The Best Hit OST	collaboration - variety show

== Filmography ==
=== Film ===
Year	Title	Korean title	Role	Notes/Ref.
1994	The Moon Rises On Its Own	혼자뜨는 달	Cha Gal-chi	
2002	A Perfect Match	좋은 사람 있으면 소개시켜 줘	Hyo-Jin's Senior	
2004	Everybody Has Secrets	누구나 비밀은 있다	Sang-il	
2005	Valiant	발리언트	Rollo	Korean dub
2005	Marrying the Mafia II	가문의 영광 2 - 가문의 위기	Jang Seok-jae	
2006	Barefoot Ki-bong	맨발의 기봉이	Yeo Chang	
2006	Between Love and Hate	연애, 그 참을 수 없는 가벼움	Joon-yong	
2006	Marrying the Mafia III	가문의 영광 3 - 가문의 부활	Jang Seok-jae	
2006	Three Kims	김관장 대 김관장 대 김관장	K1 Director Kim	
2006	Mr. Steel	강철선생	Gang Cheol	
2007	The Worst Man Of My Life	내 생애 최악의 남자	Seong Tae	
2008	Little Prince	어린왕자	Han Jong-cheol	
2008	While You Were Sleeping	당신이 잠든 사이에	Cheol jin	
2011	Marrying the Mafia IV	가문의 영광 4 - 가문의 수난	Jang Seok-jae	
2018	Too Hot to Die	배반의 장미	201st Guy	Cameo
2023	Marrying the Mafia	가문의 영광: 리턴즈	Jang Seok-jae	

=== Television series ===
Year	Title	Korean title	Role	Notes/Ref.
1993	Police	경찰청 사람들	Yoon Dong-ho	
1998	Soonpoong Clinic	순풍산부인과		Cameo
2004	Match Made in Heaven	천생연분	Yoon Dong-ho	Cameo
2009	The City Hall	시티홀	Dr. Tak	Cameo
2009	The Queen Returns	공주가 돌아왔다	Na Bong-hui	
2012	Salamander Guru and The Shadows	도롱뇽도사와 그림자 조작단	Seung-hoon	Cameo
2016	Ugly Miss Young-ae] 15	막돼먹은 영애씨 15		Cameo
2020	Backstreet Rookie	편의점 샛별이	Adult webtoon PD	Cameo
2021	Dark Hole	다크홀	Restaurant Owner	Cameo
2023	The Heavenly Idol	성스러운 아이돌	Sun Woo-shil	

=== Television shows ===
Year	Title	Korean title	Role	Notes/Ref.
2004–2010	Imagination Plus	상상더하기	Panel	
2006	Bungee Song King/S-MATCH	번지 노래왕/에스-메치		
2006	Roundly Roundly	둥글게 둥글게	Host	
2007–2009	Immortal Songs	불후의 명곡	Host	
2008	Kko Kko Tours Single♥Single	꼬꼬관광 싱글싱글	Host	
2009	Oppa Band	오빠밴드	Cast	
2009	Quiz Prince	퀴즈프린스	Cast	
2009	Great Hope	대망	Cast	
2009–2010	Invincible Baseball Team	천하무적 야구단	Cast	
2010	Hot Brothers	뜨거운 형제들	Cast	
2011–2013	Win Win	김승우의 승승장구	Host	Episodes 133-146
2012	God of Victory	승부의 신	Cast	
2012–2013	Beatles Code	비틀즈 코드	Moderator	Season 2
2013	Moonlight Prince	달빛프린스	Cast	
2016	Girl Spirit	걸스피릿	Gurus	
2016	The God of Music 2	음악의 신 2	Cast	
2016–2017	Life Bar	인생술집	Host	Season 1
2017	Project S Devil's Talent Donation	프로젝트 S: 악마의 재능기부	Cast	
2017	Oppa Thinking	오빠생각	Cast	Leader of Team 1
2018–present	My Little Old Boy	미운 우리 새끼	cast	Episodes 69-present
2019	Hit the Top	최고의 한방	Cast	
2021	Tiki-taCAR	티키타카	Cast	
2021	Honeymoon Tavern	우도주막	Cast	
2021–present	Dolsing Fourmen	신발 벗고 돌싱포맨	Host	
2022	Golf Battle: Birdie Buddies	편먹고 공치리4	Contestant	Season 4
2023	Show King Night	쇼킹나이트	Judge	
2025	Nae Muttaero	내 멋대로	Himself / panelist	

=== Web show ===
Year	Title	Role	Notes	Ref.
2021	The Godfather	Host	with Kai and Kim Jong-min	

=== Hosting ===
Year	Title	Notes	Ref.
2022	2022 SBS Entertainment Awards	with Jang Do-yeon and Lee Hyun-yi	

== Awards and nominations ==
Year	Award	Category	Nominated work	Result	Ref.
2004	MBC Entertainment Awards	Best Dresser Award	—N/a	Won	
2005	KBS Entertainment Awards	Top Excellence Award - Variety	Sang Sang Plus, Happy Together Friends	Won	
2005	26th Blue Dragon Film Awards	Best New Actor	Marrying the Mafia II	Nominated	
2006	43rd Grand Bell Awards	Best New Actor	Marrying the Mafia II	Nominated	
2007	KBS Entertainment Awards	Grand Prize (Daesang)	Happy Sunday: Immortal Songs	Won	
2019	13th SBS Entertainment Awards	Best Couple Award	Tak Jae-hoon (with Lee Sang-min); My Little Old Boy	Won	
2020	14th SBS Entertainment Awards	Special Award: Scene Stealer Award	My Little Old Boy	Won	
2021	15th SBS Entertainment Awards	Grand Prize (Daesang) (Note: (with Shin Dong-yup, Seo Jang-hoon, Cho Hye-seon, Kim Sun-ja, Park Young-hye, Lee Sang-min, Tak Jae-hoon, Im Won-hee, Kim Joon-ho, Kim Jong-kook, Kim Hee-chul, Lee Tae-sung, Oh Min-suk, Park Goon, Choi Jin-hyuk))	My Little Old Boy	Won	
2021	15th SBS Entertainment Awards	Top Excellence Award in Reality Category	My Little Old Boy, Dolsing Fourmen, Tiki-taCAR	Won	
2021	15th SBS Entertainment Awards	Entertainer of the Year Award	My Little Old Boy, Dolsing Fourmen	Won	
2022	16th SBS Entertainment Awards	Grand Prize (Daesang)	Tak Jae-hoon	Nominated	
2022	16th SBS Entertainment Awards	Producer Award	My Little Old Boy, Dolsing Fourmen	Won	
2023	17th SBS Entertainment Awards	Golden Solo Award	Tak Jae-hoon (with Im Won-hee, Lee Sang-min, and Kim Joon-ho); Dolsing Fourmen	Won	
2023	17th SBS Entertainment Awards	Grand Prize (Daesang)	My Little Old Boy, Dolsing Fourmen	Won	
2024	60th Baeksang Arts Awards	Best Male Variety Performer	Tak Jae-hoon	Nominated	
2025	19th SBS Entertainment Awards	Scene Stealer Award	My Turn	Won	
