= Ohlala Couple =

2012 South Korean TV series

- Promotional poster for Ohlala Couple
- Also known as: Oohlala Spouses
- Hangul: 울랄라 부부
- Hanja: 울랄라 夫婦
- RR: Ullalla bubu
- MR: Ullalla pubu
- Genre: Romance, Comedy
- Written by: Choi Soon-shik
- Directed by: Lee Jung-sub; Jeon Woo-sung
- Starring: Kim Jung-eun; Shin Hyun-joon; Han Jae-suk; Han Chae-ah
- Composer: Lee Pil-ho
- Country of origin: South Korea
- Original language: Korean
- No. of episodes: 18

Production
- Executive producers: Choi Kwan-yong; Hwang Eui-kyung
- Producers: Jeon Chang-geun; Yoon Jae-hyuk
- Production location: Korea
- Cinematography: Kim Si-hyung
- Running time: 60 minutes on Mondays and Tuesdays at 21:55 (KST)
- Production company: Content K

Original release
- Network: Korean Broadcasting System
- Release: 1 October – 27 November 2012

Related
- Please Come Back, Soon-ae

Ohlala Couple (Korean: 울랄라 부부; RR: Ullalla bubu) is a 2012 South Korean romantic comedy gender bender television series starring Kim Jung-eun, Shin Hyun-joon, Han Jae-suk and Han Chae-ah. It aired on KBS2 from October 1 to November 27, 2012 on Mondays and Tuesdays at 21:55 for 18 episodes.

== Plot ==
Yeo-ok and Soo-nam's marriage is on the rocks after Yeo-ok catches her hotelier husband cheating on her with another woman. One day, they find that their souls have swapped bodies, and begin to understand each other by experiencing each other's lives.

== Cast ==
- Kim Jung-eun as Na Yeo-ok
  - Bang Joon-seo as young Yeo-ok
- Shin Hyun-joon as Go Soo-na
- Han Jae-suk as Jang Hyun-woo
  - Kim Ji-hoon as young Hyun-woo
- Han Chae-ah as Victoria Kim
- Byun Hee-bong as old man Wolha, matchmaker of fate
- Narsha as Moosan, goddess
- Jung Jae-soon as Park Bong-sook
- Hyun Jyu-ni as Go Il-ran
- Uhm Do-hyun as Go Ki-chan
- Kim Myung-guk as Han Man-soo
- Song Young-kyu as Kang Jin-goo
- Choi Sung-kook as Lee Baek-ho
- Ryu Shi-hyun as Na Ae-sook
- Robert Harley as John
- Lee Deok-hee as Yeo-ok's mother
- Kim Bo-mi as Victoria's mother
- Nam Gyu-ri as Bae Jung-ah (cameo, ep 1)
- Eugene as Min-young, Soo-nam's ex-girlfriend (cameo, ep 2)
- Kim Byung-man as expert who specializes in catching cheating spouses (cameo, ep 2)
- Kim Chang-ryul as Go Il-ran's blind date (cameo, ep 4)
- Nam Hee-suk as man in traffic accident (cameo)
- Wang Bit-na as Jin-sook (cameo)
- Park Sang-myun as trainer (cameo)
- Kim Soo-mi as Samshin grandmother (cameo)
