= Im Hyung-joon =

South Korean actor

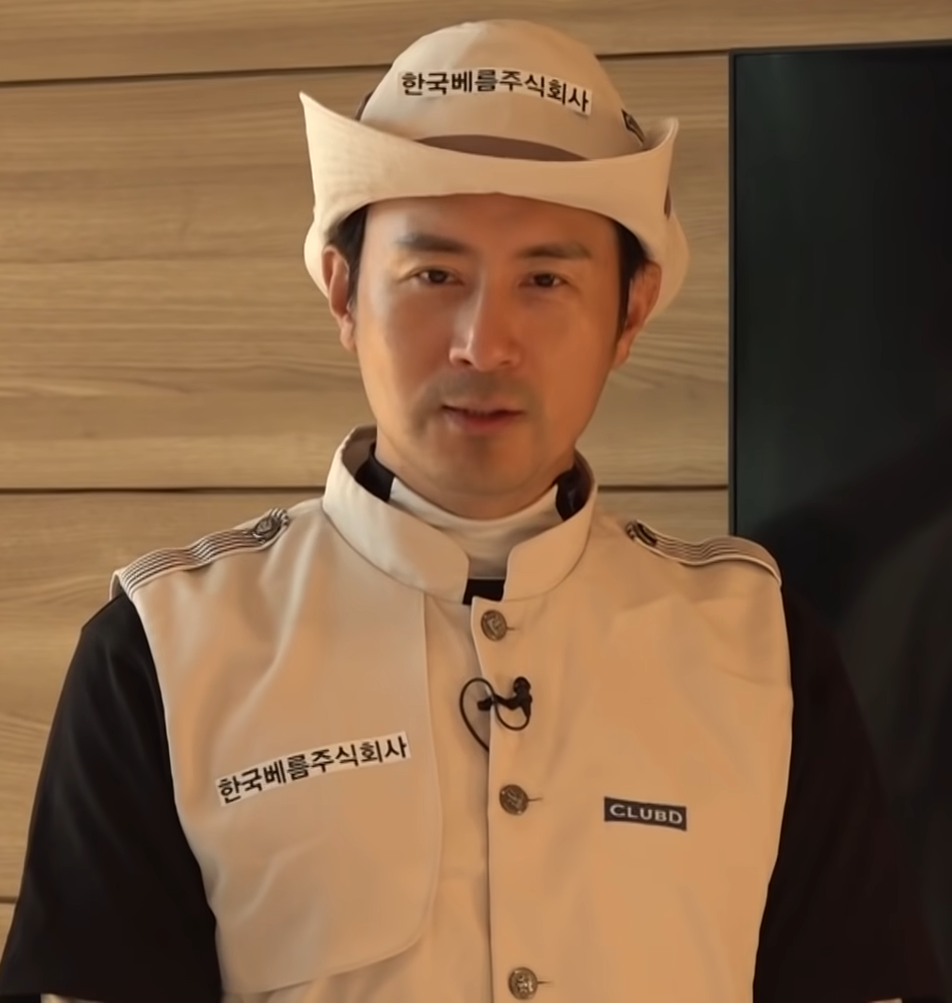
- Im in 2021
- Born: May 10, 1974 (age 52); Seoul, South Korea
- Education: Seoul Institute of the Arts – Theater
- Occupation: Actor
- Years active: 1998–present
- Agent: Genstars
- Spouses: Park Soo-jin (m. 2012; div. 2018); Ha Se-mi (하세미) (m. 2022)
- Children: 2

Korean name
- Hangul: 임형준
- Hanja: 林炯俊
- RR: Im Hyeongjun
- MR: Im Hyŏngjun

Im Hyung-joon (Korean: 임형준, born May 10, 1974) is a South Korean actor.

== Personal life ==
On January 2, 2012, Im married his non-celebrity girlfriend, who is ten years younger than him, at Gimpo Mayfield Hotel. They gave birth to the first child, a son, on August 24, 2012. The couple divorced in 2018.

On July 7, 2023, it was reported that Im had registered his marriage to his girlfriend after two years of dating in 2022 and that their daughter was born in April 2023.

== Filmography ==
=== Film ===
Year	Title	Role	Ref.
1998	Shiri	OP Commando	
2002	Fun Movie	Crew 2	
2002	Break Out	Elementary school alumni	
2003	Once Upon a Time in a Battlefield	Buyeo Tae	
2003	Taegukgi	Young man at political group	
2004	Doll Master	Jeong-gi	
2005	A Bold Family	Assistant director	
2005	Marrying the Mafia II	Jang Kyung-jae	
2006	Barefoot Ki-bong	Taxi driver	
2006	Marrying the Mafia III	Jang Kyung-jae	
2006	Who Slept with Her?	Sex shop boss	
2007	Swindler in My Mom's House	Sung-chil	
2008	Once Upon a Time	Deok-sool	
2009	Closer to Heaven	Bae Seok-won	
2010	A Better Tomorrow	Detective Lee	
2011	Marrying the Mafia IV	Jang Kyung-jae	
2012	I Am the King	Jang Yeong-sil	
2012	Gaiji Keisatsu	Kim Jeong-soo / Okuda Masahide	
2013	Blood and Ties	Shim Joon-young	
2015	Circle of Atonement	Shin Ji-cheol	
2015	Speed	Teacher Park	
2017	The Star Next Door	Kim Soon-deok / Reporter Kim	
2017	The Outlaws	Do Seung-woo	
2018	On Your Wedding Day	Mr. Bae (cameo)	
2022	Men of Plastic		
2025	Run to the West	Seok Tae	

=== Television series ===
Year	Title	Role	Notes	Ref.
2007	Urban Legends Déjà Vu	Kim Sung-ho		
2008	Don't Ask Me About the Past	Dong-geun		
2008	Robber	Joong-sik		
2009	Iris	Jin Sa-woo's subordinate		
2012	The Third Hospital	Min Joo-an		
2012	My Kids Give Me a Headache	Clothing store customer	Cameo (episode 10)	
2013	Dating Agency: Cyrano	Jin Joon-hyuk	Cameo (episode 1–3)	
2014	Inspiring Generation	Koichi		
2014	You Are My Destiny	Mr. Choi, Mi-ja's husband		
2014	Drama Festival – Old Goodbye	CEO Go		
2015	Angry Mom	Oh Jin-sang		
2015	The Merchant: Gaekju 2015	Oh Deok-gae		
2017	Criminal Minds	Seo Jin-hwan		
2021	Be My Dream Family	Geum Sang-goo		

=== Web series ===
Year	Title	Role	Ref.
2022	Big Bet	Jo Yoon-ki	

=== Television show ===
Year	Title	Role	Notes	Ref.
2006	Roundly Roundly	Cast member		
2009–2010	Invincible Baseball Team	Cast member		
2010	Portrait of a Beauty	MC		
2014–2015	Real Men	Cast member	Season 1	
2016–2017	Singing Battle	Contestant	Pilot, Episodes 1–3, 14–15	

== Musical/Theater ==
Year	Title	Role	Ref.
1999	Subway Line 1		
2011	200 Pounds Beauty	Lee Gong-hak	
2012	Le Passe-Muraille	Police 2 / Lawyer	

== Awards and nominations ==
Year	Award	Category	Nominated work	Result	Ref.
2014	34th Golden Film Festival	Best Supporting Actor	Blood and Ties	Won	
2014	MBC Entertainment Awards	New Star of the Year	Real Men	Won	
