= Marrying the Mafia II =

- Theatrical release poster
- Hangul: 가문의 위기
- Hanja: 家門의 危機
- RR: Gamunui wigi
- MR: Kamunŭi wigi
- Directed by: Jeong Yong-ki
- Written by: Jeong Tae-won
- Produced by: Jeong Tae-won
- Starring: Shin Hyun-joon; Kim Won-hee; Kim Soo-mi; Tak Jae-hoon; Gong Hyung-jin; Jeong Jun-ha; Im Hyung-joon
- Cinematography: Moon Yong-shik
- Edited by: Kim Sun-min
- Music by: Kim Woo-chul
- Distributed by: Showbox
- Release date: September 7, 2005
- Running time: 115 minutes
- Country: South Korea
- Language: Korean
- Box office: US$26.3 million

Marrying the Mafia II is a 2005 South Korean comedy film, and the second installment of the Marrying the Mafia series. It was the most successful comedy film in South Korea the year of its release; its over 5 million tickets sold represented more than 10% of the population and contributed to the third straight year that more tickets were sold for local than for Hollywood films.

== Plot ==
The oldest son of the White Tiger Gang is pressured by his family to settle down and get married; but when he finds the perfect girl, she turns out to be a state prosecutor for crimes of violence, specifically gangster related. The district attorney is a lookalike of the gangster's former fiancée who died getting hit by a truck. Their feelings develop for each other but her co-worker turns out to like her as well. She does not like him so the latter turns to the darker side of the law, by conspiring with the rival Axe Gang. Unfortunately for him, the mafia son has more than a few tricks up his sleeve and gets support from his dim-witted brothers and henchman.

== Cast ==
- Shin Hyun-joon as Jang In-jae
- Kim Won-hee as Kim Jin-gyeong/Jin-sook
- Kim Soo-mi as Hong Duk-ja
- Tak Jae-hoon as Jang Suk-jae
- Gong Hyung-jin as Prosecutor Bong
- Jeong Jun-ha - Jong-myeon
- Im Hyung-joon as Jang Gyeong-jae
- Shin Yi as Soon-Nam
- Kim Hae-gon - Yoon Do-sik
- Jung Joon-ho - Dae-seo
- Kim Tae-hwan - Hammer
- Baek Il-seob - Jin-gyeong's father

== Release ==
The film was released on DVD in South Korea and Vietnam.

== See also ==
- Marrying the Mafia
- Marrying the Mafia III
- Marrying the Mafia IV
- Marrying the Mafia V (Return of the Mafia)
