= Marrying the Mafia III =

- Poster for Marrying the Mafia III (2006)
- Hangul: 가문의 부활 - 가문의 영광 3
- Hanja: 家門의 復活 - 家門의 榮光 3
- RR: Gamunui buhwal - gamunui yeonggwang 3
- MR: Kamunŭi puhwal - kamunŭi yŏnggwang 3
- Directed by: Jeong Yong-ki
- Written by: Kim Yeong-chan
- Produced by: Chung Tae-won
- Starring: Shin Hyun-joon; Tak Jae-hoon
- Cinematography: Mun Yong-sik
- Edited by: Nam Na-yeong
- Music by: Kim U-cheol
- Distributed by: Showbox
- Release date: September 21, 2006
- Running time: 128 minutes
- Country: South Korea
- Language: Korean
- Box office: US$14.7 million

Marrying the Mafia III (Korean: 가문의 부활 - 가문의 영광 3) is a 2006 South Korean film, and the third installment of the Marrying the Mafia series.

== Plot ==
This gangster comedy chronicles the White Tiger Family of Jeolla Province. Hong Deok-ja, head of the crime family, quits the syndicate to open a kimchi business after her son marries a prosecutor. She is pulled back into the crime family when the familiar member of the rival Axe Gang is released from prison and seeks revenge upon the White Tiger Family.

== Cast ==
- Shin Hyun-joon as Jang In-jae
- Tak Jae-hoon as Jang Seok-jae
- Kim Soo-mi as Hong Deok-ja
- Kim Won-hee as Kim Jin-gyeong / Park Jin-sook
- Gong Hyung-jin as Bong Myeong-pil
- Shin Yi as Oh Soon-nam
- Park Hee-jin as Doctor
- Im Hyung-joon as Jang Kyeong-jae
- Jeong Jun-ha as Jong-myeon
- Kim Yong-gun as Jang Jeong-jong
- Kim Do-yeon as Blind date woman
- Kim Hae-gon as Yun Do-shik

== See also ==
- Marrying the Mafia
- Marrying the Mafia II
- Marrying the Mafia IV
- Marrying the Mafia V (Return of the Mafia)
