= North Korean Guys =

- Theatrical poster
- Hangul: 동해물과 백두산이
- Hanja: 東海물과 白頭山이
- RR: Donghaemulgwa Baekdusani
- MR: Tonghaemulgwa Paektusani
- Directed by: Ahn Jin-woo
- Written by: Kim Dong-hyun; Ahn Jin-woo; Kim Kyung-se; Kim Seong-hoon
- Produced by: Kimg Dong-hyun
- Starring: Jung Joon-ho; Gong Hyung-jin; Ryu Hyun-kyung
- Cinematography: Kim Yoon-soo
- Edited by: Park Gok-ji; Jeong Jin-hee
- Music by: Park Ho-joon; Kang Hoon
- Production company: Studio Sam
- Distributed by: Showbox
- Release date: December 31, 2003
- Running time: 97 minutes
- Country: South Korea
- Language: Korean

North Korean Guys (Korean: 동해물과 백두산이; RR: Donghaemulgwa Baekdusani; lit. 'East Sea's Waters and Paektu Mountain'), also released as Lost in the South Mission: Going Home, is a 2003 South Korean comedy film directed by Ahn Jin-woo. The film depicts a pair of North Korean sailors who find themselves in South Korea and their subsequent attempts to return home.

== Plot ==
Hard-nosed North Korean navy officer Baek-doo Choi (Jung Joon-ho) and his light-hearted sergeant Dong-hae Lim (Gong Hyung-jin), go on a fishing trip in the Sea of Japan. The pair fall asleep in their boat and are violently awoken by a squall. Clinging to their tiny craft, they struggle to survive the storm. By the time the storm passes, they have been washed deep into South Korean borders. Realizing their plight, they conceal their boat and explore their surroundings.

They are continually shocked by the culture of South Korea, but eventually recover their bearings and befriend a girl, Han Nara (Ryu Hyun-kyung). Unfortunately for the sailors trapped in enemy territory, Nara is a runaway and her father is a police chief, which only makes it more difficult for them to blend in. After their repeated attempts to escape fail, they enter a talent contest in order to win the first place prize: a trip to Mount Kumgang, North Korea.

== See also ==
- The Russians Are Coming, the Russians Are Coming
