= Shin Hyun-joon (actor) =

South Korean actor (born 1968)

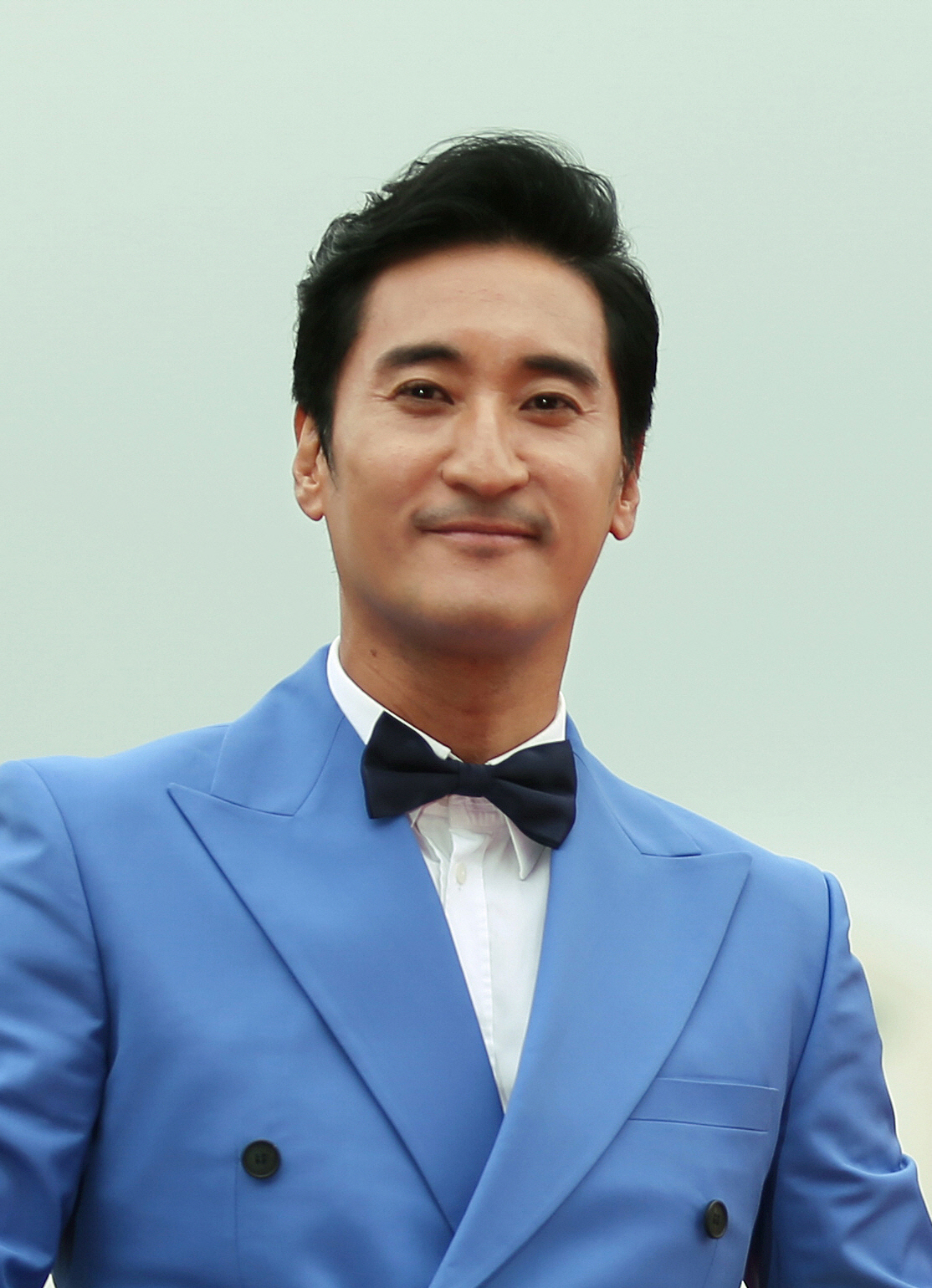
- Shin in 2014
- Born: October 28, 1968 (age 58); Seoul, South Korea
- Education: Yonsei University – Athletics; Yonsei University Graduate School of Journalism and Mass Communication – 최고위과정 (Honors)
- Occupation: Actor
- Years active: 1990–present
- Spouse: Kim Kyung-mi (m. 2013)
- Children: 3

Korean name
- Hangul: 신현준
- Hanja: 申鉉濬
- RR: Sin Hyeonjun
- MR: Sin Hyŏnjun

Shin Hyun-joon (Korean: 신현준; born October 28, 1968) is a South Korean actor. He is best known for his roles in the films Bichunmoo (2000), Guns & Talks (2001), Marrying the Mafia II (2005) and its sequel, Barefoot Ki-bong (2006), as well as the television series Stairway to Heaven (2003–2004). He is also known as the photographer in the popular music video "Because I'm A Girl" by KISS. In the Korean press, he is nicknamed the "Arab Prince" due to his foreign look and long eyelashes.

== Career ==
Shin was an athletics major at Yonsei University before starting a career in modeling and acting in 1989. His film debut came in director Im Kwon-taek's Son of a General series, set during Japanese occupation in the 1920s. He continued working with Im until the mid '90s and also acted in Hwa-Om-Kyung, Jang Sun-woo's award-winning film based on the Avatamsaka Sutra.

In recent years Shin has turned more towards popular cinema, finding his greatest success in fantasy/sci-fi works such as The Gingko Bed, The Soul Guardians, and the Korean-Chinese co-production Bichunmoo, as well as gangster comedies Marrying the Mafia II and Guns & Talks. In one of his most iconic roles, Shin played a 40-year-old marathon runner with the mental faculties of an 8-year-old boy in Barefoot Ki-bong.

A devout Christian, he published a photo-essay book Shin Hyun-joon's Confessions in 2008, which documented his personal insights into life and faith. The first printing sold out in two days, and the book was also released in China and Japan. Confessions contained a foreword from Hong Kong star Jackie Chan as well as religious testimonies from other Korean celebrities such as Choi Ji-woo, Kim Won-hee and Nam Hee-seok. He is also known for his missionary work, volunteer work, and charitable endeavors.

In addition to his work as an actor, Shin currently hosts the entertainment news program Entertainment Weekly on KBS2, the KBS Nine O'Clock News segment KBS Entertainment 925 on KBS1, and the Channel A talk show Show King. He has written two children's books: Aladdin and the Magic Lamp (2012) and Clown with Smiles and Tears (2013). He has also been an acting professor at Induk University since March 2010.

Shin established the production company HJ Film and is the CEO of 3J Cosmetics.

== Personal life ==
Shin married Kim Kyung-mi (Linda Kim), a Korean American woman 12 years his junior, at the Grand Hyatt Seoul on May 26, 2013. His wife studied for a doctorate in music in the U.S., and Shin said on his show Entertainment Weekly that he bumped into her in the doorway of a building and fell in love with her at first sight.

The couple has three children.

== Filmography ==
=== Film ===
- Ghost Police (2025)
- George and Bong-shik (TBA)
- The Assassin (2023) as Lee Nan
- Handsome (2022) as Mi-nam
- Bad Guys Always Die (2015)
- Marrying the Mafia IV (2011)
- Sin of a Family (2011)
- Kill Me (2009)
- His Last Gift (2008)
- The Worst Guy Ever (2007)
- Master Kims (2007)
- Hot for Teacher (2006)
- Marrying the Mafia III (2006)
- Barefoot Ki-bong (2006)
- Shadowless Sword (2005)
- Marrying the Mafia II (2005)
- Hi! Dharma 2: Showdown in Seoul (2004)
- Face (2004)
- Blue (2003)
- Once Upon a Time in a Battlefield (2003)
- Guns & Talks (2001)
- Siren (2000)
- Bichunmoo (2000)
- The Soul Guardians (1998)
- The Story of a Man (1998)
- KK Family List (1997)
- Maria and the Inn (1997)
- Lament (1997)
- The Gingko Bed (1996)
- Channel 69 (1996)
- Hong Gil-dong (animated, 1995)
- The Taebaek Mountains (1994)
- Love is Oh Yeah! (1993)
- Hwa-Om-Kyung (1993)
- General's Son III (1992)
- General's Son II (1991)
- Portrait of the Days of Youth (1991)
- General's Son (1990)

=== Television series ===
- Iron Family (KBS2, 2024)
- From Now On, Showtime! (MBC, 2022) – Special appearance
- Moorim School: Saga of the Brave (KBS2, 2016)
- Butterfly (MTV, 2013)
- Ohlala Couple (KBS2, 2012)
- Bridal Mask (KBS2, 2012)
- Dummy Mommy (SBS, 2012)
- Road No. 1 (MBC, 2010) – cameo
- Cain and Abel (SBS, 2009)
- Star's Lover (SBS, 2008) – cameo
- Rondo (TBS, 2006)
- Stairway to Heaven (SBS, 2003)
- I Love You! I Love You! (SBS, 1998)
- White Nights 3.98 (SBS, 1998)
- Wedding Dress (KBS2, 1997)
- The Brothers' River (SBS, 1996)
- 1.5 (MBC, 1996)
- Sons of the Wind (KBS2, 1995)

=== Variety shows ===
- Great Guide (2023, Tour customers)
- God of Lawyer' (2022, Host)
- Bangka Road (2021–2023) – Season 1–2
- KBS Entertainment 925 (2013–2019) – Anchor
- Show King (2011–present) – MC
- Entertainment Weekly (2010–2019) – MC
- Enjoy Today (2010-2011) – MC
- The Dreaming Sea (KBS2, 2013) – Member
- Rural Police (2017–2018) – Member, seasons 1-4
- Family Outing
- My Daughter's Men

=== Music video appearances ===
- Zi-A – "Choked With Grief" (2008)
- Zi-A – "I'm Happy" (2008)
- Zi-A – "I Love You, I'm Sorry" (2008)
- Zi-A – "Guardian Angel" (2007)
- Zi-A – "Together with a Star in My Heart" (2007)
- Zi-A – "Absentmindedly" (2007)
- KISS – "Because I'm a Girl" (2001)
- Lee Soo-young – "Never Again" (2001)
- Jo Sung-mo – "For Your Soul" (1999)
- Lee Seung-chul – 말리꽃 (1999)
- Bobby Kim – "Remember Last Christmas" (1998)

== Bibliography ==
- Clown with Smiles and Tears (2013)
- Aladdin and the Magic Lamp (2012)
- 배우 연기를 훔쳐라 (2012)
- Shin Hyun-joon's Confessions (2008)

== Ambassadorship ==
- 2022: Anti-phishing voice ambassador for Korea National Police Agency
- 2010: Goodwill Ambassador for Korea National Red Cross
- 2010: Goodwill Ambassador for Grain Welfare Foundation
- 2010: Goodwill Ambassador for World No Tobacco Day
- 2010: Goodwill Ambassador for the 1004 Marathon Relay for Disabled People
- 2010: Goodwill Ambassador for the 2010 Bible EXPO
- 2008: Goodwill Ambassador for South Korea's World Refugee Day
- 2007: Goodwill Ambassador for the 7th World Paralympic Games

== Awards ==
- 2012 KBS Drama Awards– Excellence Award, Actor in a Miniseries (Ohlala Couple)
- 2012 KBS Entertainment Awards – Top Entertainer Award (Entertainment Weekly)
- 2011 12th Korea Visual Arts Festival – Photogenic Award, Movie Actor category
- 2011 18th Han Il Culture Awards – Grand Prize, Cultural Diplomacy category
- 2010 MBC Entertainment Awards – Special Award in Show/Variety (Enjoy Today)
- 2008 16th Chunsa Film Art Awards – Hallyu Cultural Award
- 2006 26th Hawaii International Film Festival – Asian Star Award
- 2006 27th Blue Dragon Film Awards – Popular Star Award (Barefoot Ki-bong)
- 2006 4th Korea Fashion World Awards – Best Dressed Award
- 2001 Best Dresser Swan Awards – Best Dressed, Movie Actor category
- 1999 Golden Disk Awards: Popular Music Video Award (Jo Sung-mo's For Your Soul)
- 1992 30th Grand Bell Awards – Best New Actor
