= Jeong Jun-ha =

South Korean entertainer (born 1971)

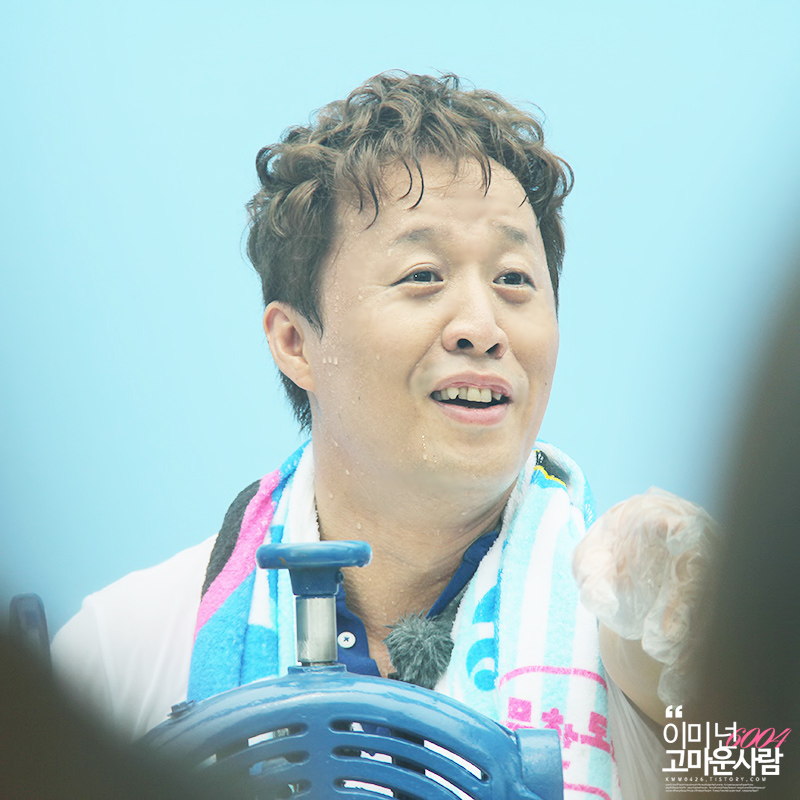
- Jeong in 2013
- Born: Jeong Jun Ha; March 18, 1971 (age 55); Daebang-dong, Dongjak District, Seoul, South Korea
- Notable work: Member of Infinite Challenge; Actor in High Kick! Member of Hangout with Yoo
- Spouse: Nina Yagi (m. 2012)
- Children: 1

Comedy career
- Years active: 1995–present
- Medium: Stand-up, television
- Genres: Comedy, Entertainment, Stage, Music

Korean name
- Hangul: 정준하
- RR: Jeong Junha
- MR: Chŏng Chunha

Jeong Jun-ha (Korean: 정준하; born March 18, 1971) is a South Korean comedian, entertainer and television personality. Outside of South Korea, Jeong is most well-known as a longtime member of the variety show Infinite Challenge, which ran from 2005 to 2018.

== Career ==
After graduating from Gangseo Senior High School, Jeong entered directly into the Korean entertainment industry. While working as an official manager of comedian Lee Hwi-jae, Jeong followed Lee onto the set of the MBC programme "Theme Theater" in 1994, where he was offered a bit part and appeared on screen. Although initially intended to be a one-off cameo, the positive audience reception led to him being cast as a regular performer.

After coping with a depression of his career, he appeared in a segment of the brand-new comedy programme "Comedy House - No-brain Survival" (MBC, 2003–2005). This segment was a parody of the segment "Brain Survivor" from Sunday Sunday Night,

In his later career, he has become a top Korean comedian. He has appeared in a wide range of programmes in the entertainment industry. During the winter season of 2006–2007, he was a cast member of The Full Monty (as Dave). He has also taken part in several Korean sitcoms and movies, including the top-rated High Kick! (as Lee Jun-ha) and the movie Marrying the Mafia II (as Jong-myeon).

=== Infinite Challenge ===
Towards the end of 2005, Jeong was persuaded by Yoo Jae-suk to join the cast of Infinite Challenge, then a segment of a larger variety show known as "Saturday's Big Surprise." He had previously appeared on the show as a guest in Season 1 earlier that year, garnering significant attention from viewers after he finished a bowl of noodles in less than five seconds. Although initially struggling to adapt to the show's style and atmosphere, Jeong's tenure lasted from his debut until the show's final broadcast in 2018, being as one of the longest-serving cast members on the show.

== Personal life ==
As of September 2010, he operates a Japanese restaurant at Gangnam District, which is located near his home. After four years of dating, he married his girlfriend, Nina Yagi on May 20, 2012. The couple welcomed their first child, a son named Ryouha, on March 22, 2013.

== Filmography ==
=== Music video appearances ===
- PSY "Gentleman" (젠틀맨) (2013)

=== Recent programmes ===
- Y-Star's God of Eating's Road (식신로드) (since 2010)
- Channel IHQ A Leader's Day (2021)
- Youtube HahaPD Bottom Duo (2021)

=== Former programmes ===
- SBS's Banjun Drama (대결! 반전드라마) (2004)
- MBC's High Kick! (거침없이 하이킥)
- MBC Drama's God of Eating Expedition (식신원정대) (2008–2010)
- MBC's Sunday Night - Gender Communication: Project Exploration of Genders (남녀소통 프로젝트 남심여심) (2012)
- MBC's Sunday Night - Magic Concert (매직콘서트 이것이 마술이다) (2012–2013)
- MBC's Infinite Challenge (무한도전) (2006–2018)
- Mnet's Show Me the Money 5 (쇼미더머니 5)
- MBC's King of Mask Singer (미스터리 음악쇼 복면가왕) (2019)
- JTBC's Meat Party Talk (육자회담) (2020)
- MBC's Hangout with Yoo (놀면 뭐하니) (2021–2023)

=== Radio shows ===
Year	Title	Notes	Ref.
2021–2022	Single Show	DJ with Shin Ji	

=== Film ===
Year	Title	Role	Ref.
2023	Marrying the Mafia	Jong-myeon	
2022	DC League of Super-Pets	Lead role; Korean dub voice-over as Krypto / Bark Kent / Superdog	
2012	Wreck-It Ralph (Wreck-It Ralph, Korean version)		
2011	Marrying the Mafia IV	Jong-myeon	
2011	Honor of Family	Jong Mun	
2006	Marrying the Mafia III	Jong-myeon	
2006	The Legend of Seven Cutter	Koh Min Shi	
2005	Marrying the Mafia II	Jong-myeon	
2004	Everybody Has Little Secret	Heo Ji-neun	

=== Television series ===
Year	Title	Role	Notes	Ref.
2022	Tomorrow	Chief Jeong	Cameo (episode 1–2)	
2023	Kokdu: Season of Deity	employee	Cameo (episode 3)	

=== Web series ===
Year	Title	Role	Notes	Ref.
2021	Floor	Park Kang-hyeon	Audio drama	

== Awards and nominations ==
Year	Award	Category	Result
2003	3rd MBC Entertainment Awards	Comedy TV Prize	Won
2003	3rd MBC Entertainment Awards	Popularity Award	Won
2007	Intellectual Property Protection Association	Nationwide Citizen Ambassador	Won
2007	7th MBC Entertainment Awards	Daesang (Grand Prize) (with Lee Soon-jae, Infinite Challenge team and co-won)	Won
2009	9th MBC Entertainment Awards	Best Male Variety Daesang	Won
2009	9th MBC Entertainment Awards	PD Award (Infinite Challenge team and co-won)	Won
2010	11th Korean National Assembly Award	Award For Best TV Programme of the Year (TEO PD with entire directing members of Infinite Challenge)	Won
2010	22nd Korean Producers Grandprix	Award For Best TV Entertainment Programme (Co winner, with entire directing members of Infinite Challenge)	Won
2011	11th MBC Entertainment Awards	"Best Couple" Awards with Park Myeong-su	Won
2014	14th MBC Entertainment Awards	High Excellence Award	Won
2016	16th MBC Entertainment Awards	Daesang (Grand Prize)	Nominated
2016	16th MBC Entertainment Awards	Top Male Excellence Award in Variety Show	Won
2021	2021 MBC Entertainment Awards	Rookie of the Year in Radio / Jung Jun-ha and Shinji's Single Smile Show	Won

== See also ==
- Infinite Challenge
- Munhwa Broadcasting Corporation
