= Barefoot Ki-bong =

- Theatrical release poster
- Hangul: 맨발의 기봉이
- RR: Maenbarui Gibongi
- MR: Maenbarŭi Kibongi
- Directed by: Kwon Soo-kyung
- Written by: Kwon Soo-kyung; Kwon Soon-won
- Produced by: Chung Tae-won; Choe Hyeon-muk; Jo Hyeon-gil
- Starring: Shin Hyun-joon; Kim Soo-mi; Im Ha-ryong; Tak Jae-hoon; Kim Hyo-jin
- Cinematography: Kim Yong-cheol
- Edited by: Kim Sun-min
- Music by: Kim U-cheol; Park Kyeong-jin
- Distributed by: Showbox
- Release date: 26 April 2006
- Running time: 100 minutes
- Country: South Korea
- Language: Korean
- Box office: $11,968,478

Barefoot Ki-bong (Korean: 맨발의 기봉이) is a 2006 South Korean comedy drama film written and directed by Kwon Soo-kyung, starring Shin Hyun-joon, Kim Soo-mi, Im Ha-ryong, Tak Jae-hoon, and Kim Hyo-jin. It was released theatrically on April 26, 2006.

== Plot ==
Ki-bong is a mentally challenged forty-year-old man who lives in a rural village with his aging mother. After accidentally winning a local race, Ki-bong finds himself training for the National Amateur Half Marathon so that he can buy his mother some false teeth with the prize money. Despite being coached by the head of the village, Mr. Baek, the villagers remain skeptical about his chances of winning, all except for the girl who works in the local photo shop.

== Cast ==
- Shin Hyun-joon as Um Ki-bong, an old bachelor in a rural village who suffered from a fever at the age of 4 and lost his intelligence at the age of 8, but loves his mother more than anyone else.
- Kim Soo-mi as Kim Dong-soon, Ki-bong's mother.
- Im Ha-ryong as Baek Yi-jang, the mayor who served 20 consecutive years in the village.
- Tak Jae-hoon as Baek Yeo-chang, Yi-jang's immature son.
- Kim Hyo-jin as Jeong-won, a kind-hearted woman who runs a photography shop.
- Ji Dae-han
- Jo Deok-hyeon
- Yoo Min-seok
- Do Ji-won

== Production ==
The film based its story on the real person Um Ki Bong, a disabled person who gained attention through a documentary that locally aired in the country for his filial piety and running capabilities. The film was filmed in Namhae.

== Release ==
Barefoot Ki-bong was released in South Korea on 26 April 2006, and on its opening weekend was ranked second at the box office with 362,023 admissions. It went on to receive a total of 2,347,311 admissions nationwide, making it the ninth biggest selling Korean film of 2006, and grossing (as of 28 May 2006) $11,968,478.
