= Jung Joon-ho =

South Korean actor (born 1970)

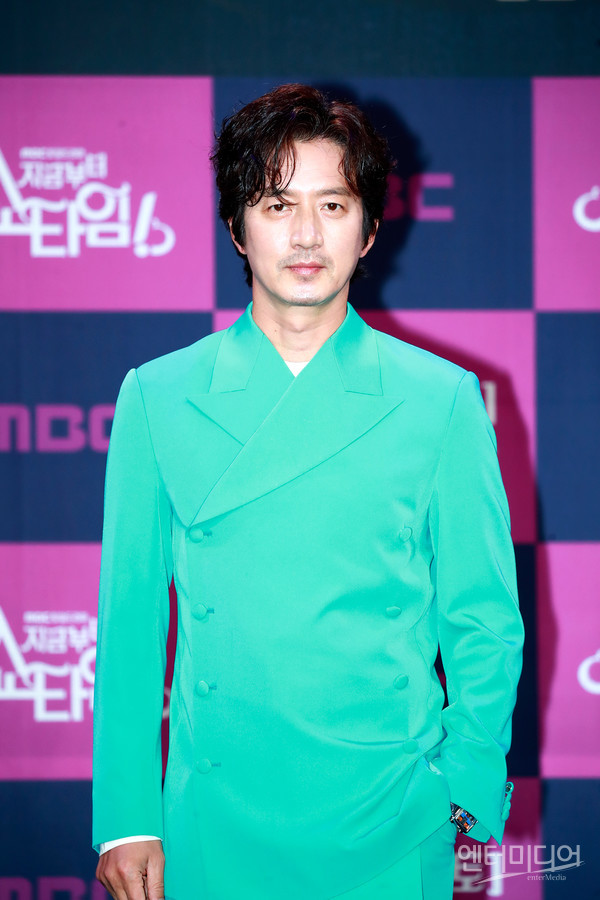
- Jung in April 2022
- Born: November 9, 1969 (age 56); Yesan County, South Chungcheong Province, South Korea
- Education: Kyung Hee University – B.A. in Theater and Film; Kyung Hee University – Masters in Media Studies
- Occupation: Actor
- Years active: 1995–present
- Agent: Hunus Entertainment
- Spouse: Lee Ha-jung (m. 2011)
- Children: 2

Korean name
- Hangul: 정준호
- Hanja: 鄭俊鎬
- RR: Jeong Junho
- MR: Chŏng Chunho

Jung Joon-ho (Korean: 정준호; born November 9, 1969) is a South Korean actor. He first gained fame in the television series Women Like You (2000). He is best known for the films My Boss, My Hero (2001) and its 2006 sequel, Marrying the Mafia (2002), Another Public Enemy (2005), as well as the hit television series Iris (2009) and Sky Castle (2018–2019).

== Career ==
Jung started his acting career in 1995. He never thought of entering the entertainment industry and becoming an actor. He admitted that when he was a kid, he was shy and would cry when his teacher placed him in front of the class to sing. After enlisting in the military, he often hosted events. He began to realize his talent - acting. He joined MBC station training class at 1995. Although he worked with many famous stars like Lee Young-ae during the first few years of his acting career, the movies and series he made in the first few years did not lend him much limelight; he remained in obscurity. Feeling discouraged, he had thoughts of retiring from the entertainment industry. After all, he considered himself as an introvert. His personality might not be suitable as an actor.

In 2000, he landed a role in television series, Women Like You (왕추). The series propelled him to stardom. At the same year, he was cast in My Boss, My Hero. To his surprise, the movie not only received high box office record but also solidified his star power. Due to his success with his comedic role in My Boss, My Hero, he was cast in many more comedic roles in series and movies between 2002 and 2006. All of them were pretty successful. His comedic image was deeply engraved in fans' mind. However, he felt typecast and hoped for a change of image and a breakthrough in his career. He questioned himself which career route he wished to head down and which new image he wanted to develop.

In 2005, a director suggested him to play a villain in Another Public Enemy. His performance stunned his fans and the media. They never knew that Jung Jun-ho could play a villainous side. The positive remarks he received from his fans and media boosted his confidence in his acting. In 2008 and 2009, he gave outstanding performances in Last Scandal and Iris. He hopes to take on more exotic roles in his upcoming series and movies that will give audiences a fresh feeling every time they see him onscreen.

== Personal life ==
Jung Jun-ho has an older sister and two younger brothers.

On March 25, 2011, he married MBC announcer Lee Ha-jung. They met in November 2010 when she interviewed him on the set of his drama Queen of Reversals. They have 2 children: son Si-wook (born 2014) and daughter (born 2019).

== Filmography ==
=== Television ===
- From Now On, Showtime! (MBC, 2022)
- True Beauty (tvN, 2020–2021)
- The Tale of Nokdu (KBS2, 2019)
- Sky Castle (jTBC, 2018–19)
- Flowers of the Prison (MBC, 2016)
- Sweet, Savage Family (MBC, 2015)
- Mama (MBC, 2014)
- Your Neighbor's Wife (jTBC, 2013)
- Queen of Reversals (MBC, 2010)
- IRIS (KBS2, 2009)
- Last Scandal (MBC, 2008)
- Perhaps Love (Mnet, 2007)
- Princess Lulu (SBS, 2005)
- Hotelier (MBC, 2001) (cameo)
- Air Force (MBC, 2000)
- Women Like You (MBC, 2000)
- Mr. Duke (MBC, 2000) (cameo)
- Goodbye My Love (MBC, 1999)
- Love (MBC, 1998)
- Sunflower (MBC, 1998)
- Condition of Love (MBC, 1997)
- Cinderella (MBC, 1997)
- The Fourth Republic (MBC, 1995)

=== Film ===
- Hitman 2 (2025)
- Ghost Police (2025)
- Smoking Tigers (2023)
- The Fisherman as Jong-beom (2022)
- Hitman: Agent Jun (2020)
- Operation Chromite (2016)
- Return of the Mafia (2012)
- George and Bong-sik (2010, unreleased)
- Love, In Between (2010)
- More Than Blue (2009) (cameo)
- City of Damnation (2009)
- Swindler in My Mom's House (2007)
- West 32nd (2007) (cameo)
- Righteous Ties (2006)
- My Boss, My Teacher (2005)
- The Twins (2005)
- Another Public Enemy (2005)
- Marrying the Mafia II (2005) (cameo)
- A Wacky Switch (2004)
- North Korean Guys (2003)
- The Legend of the Evil Lake (2003)
- Unborn But Forgotten (2002)
- Marrying the Mafia (2002)
- A Perfect Match (2002)
- My Boss, My Hero (2001)
- The Last Witness (2001)
- The Siren (2000)
- Anarchists (2000)
- 1818 (1997)

=== Television shows ===
- Wife's Taste (2018–2021) – Regular member, (episode 1–144)
- Long live and work (2020) – MC, (episode 1–12)
- Star Golf Big League (2021) – Cast member
- Oh Eun-young Game (2023) – Judge

== Ambassadorship ==
- Anti-Fraud Ambassador Charter (2022)

== Accolades ==
=== Awards ===
- 2014 34th Golden Cinema Festival: Most Popular Actor (Return of the Mafia)
- 2010 MBC Drama Awards: Top Excellence Award, Actor (Queen of Reversals)
- 2009 17th Chunsa Film Art Awards: Korean Cultural Award
- 2009 KBS Drama Awards: Excellence Award, Actor in a Mid-length Drama (IRIS)
- 2008 MBC Drama Awards: Top Excellence Award, Actor (Last Scandal)
- 2007 Kyung Hee University: Achievement Award
- 2005 28th Hwanggeum Film Awards: Best Actor
- 2002 23rd Blue Dragon Film Awards: Popular Star Award (Marrying the Mafia)
- 1996 MBC Drama Awards: Best New Actor

=== State honors ===
Name of country, year given, and name of honor
| Country | Year | Honor | Ref. |
|---|---|---|---|
| South Korea (Note: Honors are given at the Korean Popular Culture and Arts Awards, arranged by the Korea Creative Content Agency and hosted by the Ministry of Culture, Sports and Tourism. They are awarded to those who have contributed to the arts and South Korea's pop culture.) | 2010 | Minister of Culture, Sports and Tourism Commendation | |
