= Kim Soo-mi =

South Korean actress (1949–2024)

- 김수미
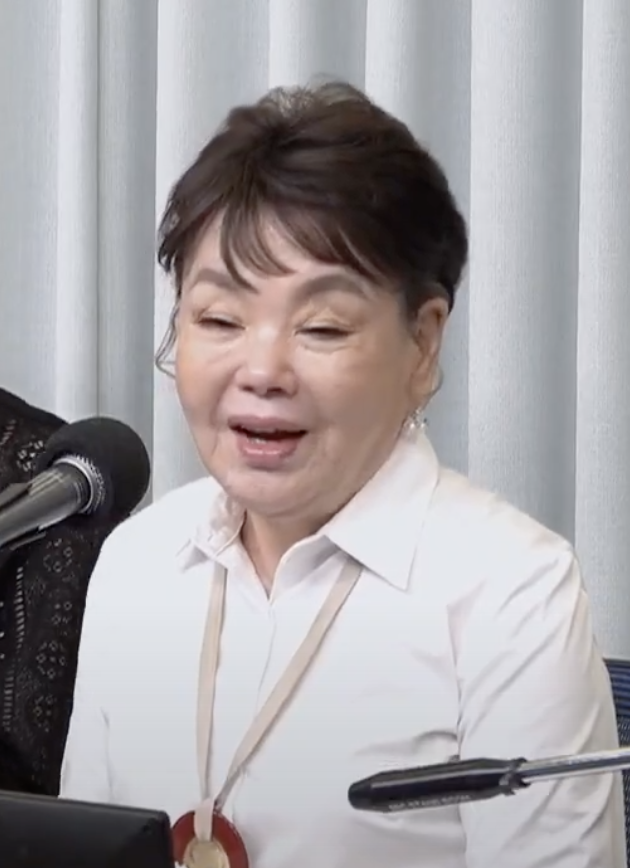
- Kim in 2023
- Born: Kim Young-ok; October 24, 1949; Gunsan, North Jeolla Province, South Korea
- Died: October 25, 2024 (aged 75); Seoul, South Korea
- Education: Korea University Graduate School of Media
- Occupation: Actress
- Years active: 1970–2024
- Relatives: Seo Hyo-rim (daughter-in-law)

Korean name
- Hangul: 김영옥
- RR: Gim Yeongok
- MR: Kim Yŏngok

Stage name
- Hangul: 김수미
- Hanja: 金守美
- RR: Gim Sumi
- MR: Kim Sumi

Kim Soo-mi (Korean: 김수미; born Kim Young-ok (김영옥); October 24, 1949 – October 25, 2024) was a South Korean actress who had a prolific career in film and television.

== Career ==
She debuted in a talent contest in 1970, then shot to fame in Country Diaries. The landmark TV series aired for almost 20 years, making her one of the most popular Korean actresses of the 1980s.

In 2003 she made a memorable cameo as a profanity-spouting ajumma in the Jang Na-ra comedy Oh! Happy Day. It successfully revamped her image and rejuvenated her fading career. She quickly became known in the Korean entertainment industry as the "Queen of Ad-lib," with her comic talent showcased in many of her succeeding projects, notably Mapado, Twilight Gangsters, Granny's Got Talent (2015), and the Marrying the Mafia sequels.

Kim also gained attention for her turns in more serious fare, such as 2006's Barefoot Ki-bong, a heartwarming pic about a developmentally disabled man. Her 2011 film Late Blossom is a romance between two elderly couples, a topic rarely explored in Korean cinema. The low-budget indie became a sleeper hit, and for her portrayal of an Alzheimer's-afflicted woman, she won Best Supporting Actress at the Blue Dragon Film Awards.

== Personal life ==
In 1998, Kim's chauffeur-driven BMW shot backward, killing her mother-in-law. She filed a ₩1 billion lawsuit against BMW, alleging that the sudden unintended acceleration had been a car defect. The Seoul District Court ruled in BMW's favor in 2003, as it was unclear whether the accident was caused by driver error or a sudden start. She appealed to the Seoul High Court.

Kim headed publicity for the 1999 Hanam International Environment Expo. From 2003 until her death in 2024, she chaired of the Department of Theater and Film at Soongsil University's College of Social Sciences.

== Illness and death ==
In May and July 2024, Kim suffered health issues due to fatigue. On October 25, her son discovered her in an unconscious state and rushed her to Seoul St. Mary's Hospital's emergency department, where she died of a cardiac arrest from hyperglycemic shock, at the age of 75. Her wake and funeral were held at Hanyang University Hospital in Seongdong District, Seoul. Her remains were cremated on October 27.

== Filmography ==
=== Film ===
- Ghost Police (2025)
- Marrying the Mafia (2023)
- Mr. Zoo: The Missing VIP (2020)
- Enemies In-Law (2015, cameo)
- Granny's Got Talent (2015)
- Born to Sing (2013)
- Woosoossi (2012, cameo)
- Marrying the Mafia IV: Unstoppable Family (2011)
- Hoodwinked Too! Hood vs. Evil (2011, Korean dubbing)
- The Suicide Forecast (2011, cameo)
- Meet the In-Laws (2011)
- Shotgun Love (2011)
- Late Blossom (2011)
- Twilight Gangsters aka Pistol Bandit Band (2010)
- Fortune Salon (2009)
- Black Heart aka Delivering Love aka Beyond All Magic (2008)
- Underground Rendezvous (2007)
- Unstoppable Marriage (2007)
- Mapado 2: Back to the Island (2007, cameo)
- Marrying the Mafia III: Family Hustle (2006)
- Dasepo Naughty Girls (2006)
- Detective Mr. Gong aka Detective ODD (2006)
- Barefoot Ki-bong (2006)
- Now and Forever (2006)
- Hoodwinked! (2006, Korean dubbing)
- Oh! My God (2006)
- Ssunday Seoul (2006)
- Mapado (2005)
- Mr. Housewife (Quiz King) (2005)
- Marrying the Mafia II: Enemy-in-law (2005)
- A Bold Family (2005)
- Mr. Gam's Victory aka Superstar Mr. Gam (2004)
- The Greatest Expectation (2003)
- Oh! Happy Day (2003, cameo)
- Downfall (1997)
- Boss (1996)
- Brave Trio (1988)
- Blitz of Ureme from Outer Space (1987)
- Ureme 4: Thunder V Operation (1987)
- Milky Way in Blue Sky (1984)
- Hwa-sun (1982)
- Cuckoo's Dolls (1976)

=== Television series ===
- Behind Every Star (2022)
- Man in the Kitchen (2017)
- Band of Sisters (2017)
- 4 Legendary Witches (2014)
- The Eldest (2013)
- Incarnation of Money (2013)
- Ohlala Couple (2012)
- Vampire Idol (2011)
- Bravo, My Love! (2011)
- Daring Women (2010)
- Unstoppable Marriage (2007)
- The King and I (2007)
- Love Needs a Miracle (2005)
- Hello Franceska 3 (2005)
- Beating Heart (2005)
- Cute or Crazy (2005)
- Something Happened in Bali (2004)
- MBC Best Theater – "My Daughter Sorani" (2003)
- See You in the Morning (2001)
- Meeting (1999)
- Mr. Nurungji and Seven Potatoes (1999)
- You're One-of-a-Kind (1999)
- The King's Path (1998)
- Beautiful Lady (1997)
- A Bluebird Has It (1997)
- Illusion (1996)
- Salted Mackerel (1996)
- Their Embrace (1996)
- Asphalt Man (1995)
- Our Sunny Days of Youth (1995)
- Professor Oh's Family (1993)
- Mapo Rainbow (1992)
- Middle Class in Words (1991)
- That Woman (1990)
- House With Deep Yard (1990)
- Legacy (1989)
- Your Toast (1989)
- The Face of a City (1987)
- The Season of Men (1985)
- Father & Son (1983)
- Park Soon-kyeong (1982)
- Sae-ah (1981)
- Angry Eyes (1981)
- Country Diaries (1980–2002)
- I Like Mom and Dad (1979)
- You (1977)
- Samiingok (1976)
- 100 Hundred Years (1973)
- Adada (1972)

=== Television show ===
- The President's People (2022)
- Ghost worm (2021)
- Soo Mi's Mountain Cabin (2021)
- Soomi's Side Dishes(2018)
- A Look at Myself (2015)
- Mamado (2013)
- Show King (Global Korean Talk Show King) (2011–2012)
- Soo-mi Ok (2011)
- Sunday Sunday Night: Age of Charm (2005)
- Kim Soo-mi's Cooking of the Day (1982–1985)

=== Radio program ===
- The Pursuit of Happiness with Kim Soo-mi and Kang Nam-gil (KBS, 1995)
- Hello, This is Kim Hong-shin and Kim Soo-mi (MBC, 1993–1995)

=== Music video appearances ===
- "Countryside Life" - T-ara N4 (2013)
- "Your Sister, Instead of You" - EZ-Life (2005)

== Theater ==
- My Mother (2023) - Bongran
- My Mother (2010–2013)
- A Midsummer Night's Dream (2005)
- 너를 보면 살고 싶다 (1998)

== Bibliography ==
- 얘들아, 힘들면 연락해! (2009)
- 맘놓고 먹어도 살 안 쪄요 (2003)
- 그해 봄, 나는 중이 되고 싶었다 (2003)
- Kim Soo-mi's Jeolla Food Stories (1998)
- I'm Sorry, I Love You (1997)
- 나는 가끔 도망가 버리고 싶다 (1993)
- 그리운 것은 말하지 않겠다 (1991)
- 너를 보면 살고 싶다 (1990)

== Ambassadorship ==
- Ambassador for Island Day (2022)
- Ambassador for Gwangju World Kimchi Festival (2022)
- Jeonbuk's Honorary Ambassador (2022)

== Awards ==
- 2013 SBS Drama Awards: Achievement Award (Incarnation of Money)
- 2011 32nd Blue Dragon Film Awards: Best Supporting Actress (Late Blossom)
- 2007 1st Korean Movie Star Awards: Best Actress Who Made Us Laugh Award (Marrying the Mafia III)
- 2006 3rd Max Movie Awards: Best Supporting Actress
- 2006 14th Chunsa Film Art Awards: Best Supporting Actress (Barefoot Ki-bong)
- 2005 26th Blue Dragon Film Awards: Popular Star Award (Mapado, Marrying the Mafia II)
- 1986 22nd Baeksang Arts Awards: Most Popular Actress, TV category (Country Diaries)
- 1986 MBC Drama Awards: Grand Prize (Daesang) (Note: A Daesang (Korean: 대상), which translates to "Grand Prize", is the highest honor given out at South Korean award ceremonies.) (Country Diaries, The Season of Men)
- 1985 MBC Drama Awards: Top Excellence Award, Actress (Country Diaries)
- 1982 Our Star Awards: Recipient
- 1981 MBC Drama Awards: Excellence Award, Actress (Country Diaries)
- 1978 MBC Drama Awards: Top Excellence Award, Actress
- 1975 MBC Drama Awards: Excellence Award, Actress
- 1972 MBC Drama Awards: Best New Actress (Adada)
