= 2006 MBC Drama Awards =

25th edition of award ceremony

- Date: December 30, 2006
- Hosted by: Yoo Jae-suk; Han Ye-seul

Highlights
- Grand Prize (Daesang): Song Il-kook

Television coverage
- Network: MBC

The 2006 MBC Drama Awards (Korean: MBC 연기대상) is a ceremony honoring the outstanding achievement in television on the Munhwa Broadcasting Corporation (MBC) network for the year of 2006. It was held on December 30, 2006, and hosted by Yoo Jae-suk and Han Ye-seul.

== Nominations and winners ==
(Winners denoted in bold)

Grand Prize (Daesang)
**Song Il-kook** – **Jumong**
Top Excellence Award, Actor	Top Excellence Award, Actress
**Song Il-kook** – **Jumong**; **Jun Kwang-ryul** – **Jumong**; Kim Rae-won – Which Star Are You From; Son Chang-min – Shin Don	**Han Hye-jin** – **Jumong**; **Ha Hee-ra** – **Love Me When You Can**; Go Hyun-jung – What's Up Fox; Oh Yeon-soo - Jumong
Excellence Award, Actor	Excellence Award, Actress
**Kim Yoon-seok** – **Love Me When You Can**; **Kim Seung-soo** – **Jumong**; Gong Yoo - One Fine Day; Oh Ji-ho – Fantasy Couple; Chun Jung-myung – What's Up Fox	**Ji Soo-won** – **Love Me When You Can**; **Han Ye-seul** – **Fantasy Couple**; Sung Yu-ri - One Fine Day; Song Yoon-ah - My Beloved Sister; Yoo Ho-jeong - Desperate Woman
Popularity Award, Actor	Popularity Award, Actress
**Oh Ji-ho** – **Fantasy Couple**; Ju Ji-hoon – Goong; Gong Yoo - One Fine Day; Kim Rae-won – Which Star Are You From; Song Il-kook – Jumong; Chun Jung-myung – What's Up Fox	**Han Ye-seul** – **Fantasy Couple**; Yoon Eun-hye – Goong; Sung Yu-ri - One Fine Day; Han Hye-jin – Jumong; Ha Hee-ra – Love Me When You Can; Go Hyun-jung – What's Up Fox
Best New Actor	Best New Actress
**Ju Ji-hoon** – **Goong**; **Won Ki-joon** – **Jumong**; Kim Ji-hoon - How Much Love?; Lee Ki-woo - Outrageous Woman; Hong Kyung-min - Love Can't Wait	**Yoon Eun-hye** – **Goong**; **Nam Sang-mi** - **Sweet Spy**; Kim Ok-vin – Over the Rainbow; Kim Eun-joo – What's Up Fox; Lee Young-ah - Love Can't Wait
Best Couple Award
**Oh Ji-ho and Han Ye-seul** – **Fantasy Couple**; Ju Ji-hoon and Yoon Eun-hye – Goong; Gong Yoo and Sung Yu-ri – One Fine Day; Kim Sung-soo and Song Yoon-ah – My Beloved Sister; Kim Ji-hoon and Cho Yeo-jeong - How Much Love?; Song Il-kook and Han Hye-jin – Jumong; Kim Rae-won and Jung Ryeo-won – Which Star Are You From; Chun Jung-myung and Go Hyun-jung – What's Up Fox
