= Birth of a Beauty =

2014 South Korean television series

- Promotional poster
- Genre: Melodrama; Romance; Comedy; Revenge
- Written by: Yoon Young-mi
- Directed by: Lee Chang-min; Park Sun-ho
- Starring: Joo Sang-wook; Han Ye-seul; Jung Gyu-woon; Wang Ji-hye
- Country of origin: South Korea
- Original language: Korean
- No. of episodes: 21

Production
- Executive producer: Son Jung-hyun
- Producer: Lee Sung-hoon
- Production company: SBS

Original release
- Network: SBS TV
- Release: November 1, 2014 – January 11, 2015

Birth of a Beauty (Korean: 미녀의 탄생; RR: Minyeoui tansaeng) is a 2014 South Korean television series starring Joo Sang-wook, Han Ye-seul, Jung Gyu-woon and Wang Ji-hye. It aired on SBS TV from November 1, 2014 to January 11, 2015 for 21 episodes.

== Plot ==
Sa Geum-ran (Ha Jae-sook), an overweight, kind-hearted woman, married into a wealthy family, but her husband Lee Kang-joon (Jung Gyu-woon) has spent the past seven years in the United States on business, leaving her to live with her in-laws, who mistreat her. She discovers that Kang-joon has secretly returned to Korea and is having an affair with broadcast announcer Gyo Chae-yeon (Wang Ji-hye), and he asks her for a divorce. Distraught, Geum-ran is involved in a car accident in which her car goes off a cliff. She is presumed dead, and secretly watches her own funeral.

Seeking revenge, Geum-ran asks Han Tae-hee (Joo Sang-wook), whom she believes to be the plastic surgeon of the makeover television show Change, to transform her; he reluctantly agrees for his own reasons. After weight loss and surgery, she emerges as a beautiful woman and takes the name Sara (Han Ye-seul), though she keeps her blunt, middle-aged personality. With Tae-hee as her coach, she plots to ruin Kang-joon and Chae-yeon's wedding, set to take place in three weeks. As she meets Kang-joon again, her old feelings resurface and she considers winning him back, until she learns that Kang-joon and Chae-yeon conspired to cause her death. Meanwhile, she and Tae-hee grow closer.

== Cast ==
=== Main characters ===
- Joo Sang-wook as Han Tae-hee
- Han Ye-seul as Sara/Sa Geum-ran/Kim Duk-sun
- Jung Gyu-woon as Lee Kang-joon
- Wang Ji-hye as Gyo Chae-yeon

=== Supporting characters ===
- Ha Jae-sook as Sa Geum-ran
- Han Sang-jin as Han Min-hyeok
- In Gyo-jin as Gyo Ji-hoon
- Han Jin-hee as Lee Jung-sik
- Kim Young-ae as Go Soon-dong
- Kang Kyung-hun as Lee Jin-young
- Jin Ye-sol as Lee Min-young
- Kwon Hwa-woon as Team leader Choi
- Kim Yong-rim as Mrs. Park
- Shim Yi-young as Eun Kyung-joo
- Kim Chung as Son Ji-sook
- Lee Jong-nam as Shim Yeo-ok
- Kim Young-ok as Shin Hui-ja, Kang-joon's grandmother
- Kim Byeong-ok as fortune teller

== Production ==
The series was Han Ye-seul's first television role in three years, following her 2011 walkout from the set of the drama Spy Myung-wol.

== Awards and nominations ==
Year	Award	Category	Recipient	Result
2014	SBS Drama Awards	Excellence Award, Actor in a Drama Special	Joo Sang-wook	Nominated
2014	SBS Drama Awards	Excellence Award, Actress in a Drama Special	Han Ye-seul	Won
2014	SBS Drama Awards	Special Award, Actor in a Drama Special	Han Sang-jin	Nominated
2014	SBS Drama Awards	Top 10 Stars	Han Ye-seul	Won
2014	SBS Drama Awards	Top 10 Stars	Joo Sang-wook	Won
2014	SBS Drama Awards	Netizen Popularity Award	Han Ye-seul	Nominated
2014	SBS Drama Awards	Netizen Popularity Award	Joo Sang-wook	Nominated
2014	SBS Drama Awards	Best Couple Award	Joo Sang-wook and Han Ye-seul	Won
2015	15th Huading Awards	Best Global Actress	Han Ye-seul	Won
