= Penny pincher =

Penny pincher or Penny Pinchers may refer to:

- a miser
- Penny Pinchers, 2011 South Korean film
- Penny Pincher!, English title of French film Radin!

== See also ==
- Frugality
