= Get Karl! Oh Soo-jung =

- Promotional poster
- Also known as: Oh Su-jung vs. Karl
- Hangul: 칼잡이 오수정
- RR: Kaljabi O Sujeong
- MR: K'aljabi O Sujŏng
- Genre: Romantic, Comedy
- Written by: Park Hye-ryun; Park Ji-eun
- Directed by: Park Hyung-ki; Jin Hyuk; Kwon Hyuk-chan
- Starring: Uhm Jung-hwa; Oh Ji-ho; Kang Sung-jin; Park Da-an
- Country of origin: South Korea
- No. of episodes: 16

Production
- Executive producers: Lee Ju-young; Kim Hyun-suk
- Producer: Shin In-soo
- Camera setup: Multi-camera
- Production companies: SEGO Entertainment; DRM Media

Original release
- Network: Seoul Broadcasting System
- Release: July 28 – September 16, 2007

Get Karl! Oh Soo-jung (Korean: 칼잡이 오수정) is a 2007 South Korean romantic comedy television series starring Uhm Jung-hwa and Oh Ji-ho. It aired on SBS from July 28 to September 16, 2007 on Saturdays and Sundays at 21:45 for 16 episodes.

The series is based on the real-life love story of Lee Ju-young, the CEO of the drama's production company who reunited with her current husband ten years after breaking up with him. Moreover, Go Man-soo is the actual name of Lee's pro-golfer husband who incidentally instructed Oh Ji-ho on his golf swings in preparation for the role.

== Plot ==
Throughout her school days, Oh Soo-jung (Uhm Jung-hwa) was the girl every boy wanted to date, and every girl wanted to be. But having watched her poor family disintegrate after her mother abandoned her incompetent father, Soo-jung naturally becomes cynical and demanding when it comes to picking her choice of man. She dates Go Man-soo (Oh Ji-ho), an Ivy League law student, despite the lack of physical attraction (he is overweight and nerdy). But the moment she finds out that he has failed his bar exam, poor Man-soo gets dumped. Eight years later, the tables are turned. Soo-jung, now in her thirties, is no longer in demand. The former "it girl" has since fallen from grace. She manages a jewelry store owned by a less attractive schoolmate who married a lawyer, and now barks at Soo-jung every chance she gets.

Man-soo returns from the States a changed man; he has transformed into famous, rich, hunky pro-golfer Karl Go. He hires Jung Woo-tak (Kang Sung-jin) to play a wealthy bachelor, and once Soo-jung falls in love with him, he's to jilt her at the altar in the same way she jilted Man-soo. Meanwhile, Karl pretends to be the debt-ridden boyfriend of Soo-jung's boarder, Yook Dae-soon (Park Da-an). But his revenge plans go awry when he and Soo-jung fall in love with each other again. On her wedding day to Woo-tak, Soo-jung runs away and chooses Karl despite believing he's poor. Bitter that Karl chose a girdle-clad "old maid" over her, Dae-soon not only steals her creative ideas for jewelry design, but reveals to Soo-jung that Karl has been making a fool of her all this time. In the end, Soo-jung triumphs over Dae-soon professionally, then proposes to Karl, and they finally get married.

== Cast ==
=== Main characters ===
- Oh Ji-ho as Go Man-soo / Karl Go
- Uhm Jung-hwa as Oh Soo-jung
- Kang Sung-jin as Jung Woo-tak
- Park Da-an as Yook Dae-soon

=== Supporting characters ===
- Ahn Sun-young as Lee Young-ae, Soo-jung's friend
- Yoo Hye-jung as Kim Pil-sook, Soo-jung's friend
- Sung Dong-il as Jung Seung-gyu, Karl's manager/friend
- Ahn Yong-joon as Choi Soo-hyuk, Soo-jung's younger brother
- Kim Kap-soo as Oh Byung-jik, Soo-jung's father
- Yu Ji-in as Shim Wol-do, Soo-jung's mother
- Kim Dong-kyun as Yoon Dong-kwan, Young-ae's husband
- Jeong Min-jin as Daniel
- Seo Hee-seung as Man-soo's father
- Han Bok-hee as Man-soo's mother

== Episode ratings ==
Date	Episode	Nationwide	Seoul
July 28, 2007	1	12.4 (9th)	12.9 (9th)
July 29, 2007	2	14.8 (6th)	16.2 (5th)
August 4, 2007	3	12.1 (8th)	12.6 (9th)
August 5, 2007	4	15.5 (5th)	16.3 (4th)
August 11, 2007	5	12.8 (7th)	13.8 (7th)
August 12, 2007	6	14.3 (10th)	15.1 (9th)
August 18, 2007	7	11.8 (9th)	12.4 (7th)
August 19, 2007	8	14.5 (6th)	15.4 (5th)
August 25, 2007	9	13.5 (7th)	14.4 (6th)
August 26, 2007	10	13.9 (8th)	14.9 (6th)
September 1, 2007	11	15.5 (5th)	16.4 (5th)
September 2, 2007	12	14.1 (6th)	15.1 (5th)
September 8, 2007	13	13.2 (6th)	13.8 (5th)
September 9, 2007	14	11.6 (8th)	12.1 (8th)
September 15, 2007	15	14.2 (6th)	14.8 (5th)
September 16, 2007	16	14.7 (9th)	15.8 (7th)
Average		13.7%	14.5%

== Soundtrack ==
1. 성공시대 - Sun
2. Man To Man (Inst.)
3. I Love Diamond (Inst.)
4. Love Line (Inst.)
5. Sentimental (Inst.)
6. Grey Shoes (Inst.)
7. Gloomy Day (Inst.)
8. Choice Of Love (Inst.)
9. Warning! (Inst.)
10. Putting On Make-Up (Inst.)
11. Regret (Inst.)
12. Step By Step (Inst.)
13. Lovely Woman (Inst.)
14. Sad Movies (Inst.)
15. Wanted! (Inst.)
16. Yellow Card (Inst.)
17. Show Me The Way (Inst.)

== International broadcast ==
- It aired in Vietnam on HTV3 from October 13, 2008, under the title Sự trả thù ngọt ngào.

== See also ==
- List of South Korean dramas
