= Big Issue (TV series) =

2019 South Korean television series

- Promotional poster
- Hangul: 빅이슈
- RR: Bigisyu
- MR: Pigisyu
- Written by: Jang Hyeok-rin
- Directed by: Lee Dong-hun
- Starring: Joo Jin-mo; Han Ye-seul; Shin So-yul
- Country of origin: South Korea
- Original language: Korean
- No. of episodes: 32 (Note: Originally scheduled to air for 36 episodes, the series was reduced by four episodes due to technical issues.) (Note: In order to circumvent Korean laws that prevent commercial breaks in the middle of an episode, what would previously have been aired as single 70 minute episodes are now being repackaged as two 35 minute episodes, with two episodes being shown each night with a commercial break between the two.)

Production
- Executive producer: Moon Bo-mi
- Camera setup: Single-camera
- Running time: 35 minutes
- Production company: HB Entertainment

Original release
- Network: SBS TV
- Release: March 6 – May 2, 2019

Big Issue (Korean: 빅이슈; RR: Bigisyu) is a 2019 South Korean television series starring Joo Jin-mo, Han Ye-seul and Shin So-yul. It aired from March 6 to May 2, 2019 on SBS TV.

== Synopsis ==
The series follows a former photojournalist who, after losing his job and family and falling into alcoholism, returns to work as a paparazzo to pay for his daughter's medical treatment. He becomes embroiled in a cutthroat rivalry involving the editor-in-chief of Sunday Tongsin, the country's most notorious celebrity scandal tabloid.

== Cast ==
=== Main ===
- Joo Jin-mo as Han Seok-joo, an elite photo journalist who loses his job and family due to an incident, and becomes alcoholic. He then gets hired to become a paparazzo.
- Han Ye-seul as Ji Soo-hyun, a notorious editor-in-chief.
- Shin So-yul as Jang Hye-jung, a news reporter team leader.

=== Supporting ===
- Kim Dong-kyun as Bong Seol-cheol
- Kim Kyu-sun as Lee Myeong-ja
- Heo Hyung-gyu as Choi Kyung-sik
- Yang Hye-ji as Moon Bo-young
- Park Han-sol as Jang Mi-rae
- Park Seon Im as Seo Young Mi
- Ahn Se-ha as a photo journalist
- Cha Soon-bae as Cha Woo-jin, deputy chief prosecutor.
- Park Jun-hee
- Choi Song-hyun as Bae Min-jung, Seok-joo's ex-wife.
- Seo Yi-soo as Han Se-eun
- Park Sin-ah as Choi Seo-hee
- Jo Hye-joo as a female assistant manager
- Park Ji-bin as Baek Eun-ho, an actor. (Ep. 9–12)

=== Special appearance ===
- Park Sang-nam as a journalist (Ep. 3)

== Production ==
- The lead roles were first offered to actors Soo Ae and Park Shin-yang, but both declined.
- The first script reading of the cast was held on December 17, 2018; and filming began in the same month.
- Big Issue was rated 19 for episodes 1, 2, 13 to 16 by the Korea Communications Commission. All other episodes were rated 15.

== Controversy ==
On March 21, 2019, the broadcast of episodes 11 and 12 was peppered with incomplete computer graphics (CG) editing and visible production notes such as "Darken windows more" and "Erase all frame outlets". In one instance, color bars were also shown in between two of the scenes. SBS later apologized to viewers, acknowledging that the episodes had aired before the CG work was completed, and also apologized to the show's cast and crew. The oversight highlighted the tight filming schedules in the South Korean broadcasting industry, and followed a similar incident in tvN's A Korean Odyssey where there were delays in removing the stunt actors' wires and processing the computer graphics.

== Ratings ==
Ep.	Broadcast date	Average audience share		
Ep.	Broadcast date	Nielsen Korea		TNmS
Ep.	Broadcast date	Nationwide	Seoul	Nationwide
1	March 6, 2019	4.1%	4.5%	3.7%
2	March 6, 2019	4.8%	5.0%	4.3%
3	March 7, 2019	3.7%	3.8%	3.5%
4	March 7, 2019	4.1%	4.3%	3.7%
5	March 13, 2019	3.7%	3.9%	N/A
6	March 13, 2019	4.5%	4.9%	N/A
7	March 14, 2019	3.7%	4.0%	N/A
8	March 14, 2019	4.0%	4.3%	N/A
9	March 20, 2019	4.3%	4.4%	3.3%
10	March 20, 2019	4.6%	4.9%	3.6%
11	March 21, 2019	3.7%	N/A	4.3%
12	March 21, 2019	4.1%	N/A	4.1%
13	March 27, 2019	3.0%	3.4%	2.8%
14	March 27, 2019	3.7%	4.0%	3.3%
15	March 28, 2019	3.3%	N/A	3.6%
16	March 28, 2019	3.6%	N/A	3.6%
17	April 10, 2019 (Note: Episodes 17 to 20, which were supposed to air on April 3 and 4, 2019 respectively, were pushed back a week to give time for the production team to work on the CG. A recap of the earlier episodes were shown in lieu of the suspension.)	2.6%	N/A	2.6%
18	April 10, 2019	2.9%	N/A	2.8%
19	April 11, 2019	2.4%	N/A	N/A
20	April 11, 2019	3.3%	N/A	N/A
21	April 17, 2019	2.5%	N/A	2.9%
22	April 17, 2019	2.8%	N/A	3.1%
23	April 18, 2019	2.6%	N/A	N/A
24	April 18, 2019	2.8%	N/A	N/A
25	April 24, 2019	2.9%	N/A	N/A
26	April 24, 2019	3.6%	N/A	N/A
27	April 25, 2019	3.0%	N/A	N/A
28	April 25, 2019	3.3%	N/A	N/A
29	May 1, 2019	2.1%	N/A	N/A
30	May 1, 2019	2.8%	N/A	N/A
31	May 2, 2019	2.9%	N/A	N/A
32	May 2, 2019	3.7%	N/A	N/A
Average		3.4%	— (Note: Due to some unpublished ratings, the exact average rating is unknown.)	—
In the table above, the blue numbers represent the lowest ratings and the red numbers represent the highest ratings.; N/A denotes that the rating is not known.
