= Look Back in Anger (TV series) =

- Also known as: Turn Your Angry Face; Youth in an Angry Face
- Genre: Action; Drama
- Written by: Kim Young-chan
- Directed by: Lee Min-hong; Lee Won-ik
- Starring: Joo Jin-mo; Park Jin-hee; Lee Min-woo
- Country of origin: South Korea
- Original language: Korean
- No. of episodes: 18

Production
- Production location: Korea
- Running time: Mondays and Tuesdays at 21:50 (KST)

Original release
- Network: Korean Broadcasting System
- Release: 28 February – 18 April 2000

Look Back in Anger (Korean: 성난 얼굴로 돌아보라; RR: Seongnan eolgullo dorabora) is a 2000 South Korean television series about two brothers' love for two women that aired on KBS2. Starring Joo Jin-mo, Lee Min-woo, Park Jin-hee and Bae Doona, the cast also includes the following actors pre-stardom: Kim Myung-min, Uhm Tae-woong, Kim Min-hee and Lee Eun-ju.

== Cast ==
- Joo Jin-mo as Lee Dong-hoon
- Park Jin-hee as Shin Jung-hee
- Kim Young-ae as Dong-hoon's mother
- Bae Doona as Lee Mi-na
- Lee Min-woo as Detective Lee Dong-jin
- Lee Eun-ju as Jung Soo-jin
- Kim Myung-min as Kim Suk-gyu
- Kil Yong-woo as Shin Sung-chul (Jung-hee's father)
- Kang Seok-woo as Hwang Byung-ki
- Oh Wook-chul as Detective Jo
- Park Nam-hyun as Detective Go
- Myung Kye-nam as Detective Lieutenant
- Jung Dong-hwan as Detective Subsection Chief
- Jeon Moo-song as Police Chief
- Kim Min-hee as Lee Hye-jung
- Park Jae-hoon as Bong Pil-doo
- Yoon Yong-hyun as Han Sang-tae
