= The Queen of Office =

2013 South Korean television series

- Promotional poster
- Also known as: Queen of the Office; Goddess of the Workplace
- Hangul: 직장의 신
- Hanja: 職場의神
- RR: Jikjangui sin
- MR: Chikchangŭi sin
- Genre: Romance; Comedy; Drama
- Written by: Yoon Nan-joong
- Directed by: Jeon Chang-geun; Noh Sang-hoon
- Starring: Kim Hye-soo; Oh Ji-ho; Jung Yu-mi; Lee Hee-joon; Jeon Hye-bin; Jo Kwon
- Composer: Kang Dong-yoon
- Country of origin: South Korea
- Original language: Korean
- No. of episodes: 16

Production
- Executive producer: Hwang Eui-kyung
- Producers: Ham Young-hoon; Park Woo-ram
- Production location: Korea
- Cinematography: Kwon Hyuk-kyun; Kim Yong-soo
- Editor: Kim Young-joo
- Running time: 60 minutes on Mondays and Tuesdays at 22:00 (KST)
- Production companies: KBS Media; MI Media; Queen of the Office SPC

Original release
- Network: Korean Broadcasting System
- Release: April 1 – May 21, 2013

Related
- Haken no Hinkaku

The Queen of Office (Korean: 직장의 신; lit. 'God of the Workplace') is a 2013 South Korean television series starring Kim Hye-soo, Oh Ji-ho, Jung Yu-mi, Lee Hee-joon, Jeon Hye-bin, and Jo Kwon. It aired on KBS2 from April 1 to May 21, 2013, on Mondays and Tuesdays at 22:00 for 16 episodes. Kim later won the Daesang (or "Grand Prize"), the highest honor at the 2013 KBS Drama Awards.

Based on the 2007 Japanese drama The Pride of the Temp (ハケンの品格, Haken no Hinkaku), the comedy/drama series uses the modern Korean workplace culture as a backdrop and revolves around charismatic perfect employee Miss Kim, who's good at everything that even her bosses are a little afraid of her. But her life is shrouded in mystery and she always disappears after her three-month temp contract is up.

The early working title was Come Back, Miss Kim (돌아와요 미스김; Dorawayo Miseu Gim).

== Cast ==
=== Main characters ===
- Kim Hye-soo as Miss Kim
Always wearing a neutral-colored business suit and with her hair firmly in place, Miss Kim is a non-regular worker. She holds 124 skill certifications in all sorts of fields, executes work with perfection, and speaks a bunch of languages including Russian. She traverses the jungle of office buildings and suddenly disappears after her three-month work contract ends. Her very name inspires awe in her colleagues, and even her superiors are afraid of her. Miss Kim goes to work at 9 a.m., and leaves at 6 p.m., unwilling to spend a microsecond more. She refuses to do work outside of her job description, never misses her lunch break, and the company wouldn't dare ask her to come in on weekends. Miss Kim says that if the company doesn't approve of her actions, it should hire three more regular employees since she does three people's work in a limited period of time. Her life outside work is shrouded in mystery: No one knows her first name, her age, or her background. Miss Kim's confidence about her ability, and also the frustration from her contract situation, allows her to be protective about her private life and blatantly reject after-work drinking sessions and other oppressive traditions of the macho corporate culture. She avoids all personal interactions, and instead chooses to live her life in her own way.

- Oh Ji-ho as Jang Gyu-jik
Jang Gyu-jik works in the upper management of Y-Jang Food Company (his name is a pun on jung gyu-jik, the Korean phrase for permanent employee). He finished his MBA in the United States, then returned to Korea. Upbeat and energetic and armed with professionalism and good work ethics, Gyu-jik is strongly devoted to his company, and puts everything on the line for his work. But he treats temps dismissively, thinking they only exist to assist regular employees with menial chores. Hot-headed and with a rather childish mentality, Gyu-jik keeps attempting to humiliate Miss Kim, but he is frequently stymied by her unexpected reactions. Gyu-jik and Miss Kim engage in numerous conflicts and confrontations, but gradually feelings of respect and love grow between them, two seemingly incompatible people.

- Jung Yu-mi as Jung Joo-ri
Jung Joo-ri has failed countless job interviews because she came from a third-rate university and has a less-than-stellar resume. Thus, she gets hired at Y-Jang Food Company only as a temp. She tries her hardest at everything but keeps making mistakes, and she lapses into saturi (or regional/rural dialect) during stressful moments. Joo-ri has a crush on her boss Jang Gyu-jik.

- Lee Hee-joon as Mu Jeong-han
He entered the company at the same time as his friend and colleague, Jang Gyu-jik. But as Gyu-jik moved up the ranks, Jeong-han kept getting left behind. Jeong-han is cold and serious (his name literally means "heartless" in Korean), and different from Gyu-jik in every way, from attitude, nature, to personal values.

- Jeon Hye-bin as Geum Bit-na
Geum Bit-na (her name means "shines like gold") was hired at the same time as Jung Joo-ri. But unlike Joo-ri, she has all the right qualifications and a first-rate education, and gets hired as a regular employee. She also happens to be the ex-girlfriend of Jang Gyu-jik.

- Jo Kwon as Kye Kyung-woo
A very polite and upright new hire.

=== Supporting characters ===
Marketing and Sales Division

- Kim Eung-soo as Hwang Gab-deuk
- Lee Ji-hoon as Gu Young-shik
- Na Seung-ho as Shin Min-goo
- Lee Mi-do as Park Bong-hee
- Song Ji-in as Oh Ji-rang
- Lee So-yoon as Yeon Na-ra
- Kim Gi-cheon as Go Jung-do

Product Development Division

- Kim Na-woon as Yeo Jang-mi
- Kim Ki-yeon as Hong Min-ah
- Chae Ji-won as the youngest staff member

BAR Machu Picchu

- Kim Bo-mi as Jo Ho-boon
- Lee Hyun-jae as Julisesa

Dispatch's Quality Job Manager

- Oh Yong as Ahn Jong-chul

Y-Jang employees

- Park Jin-wook as Ahn Tae-soo
- Lee In-chul as Park Bon-jwa
- Min Sung-ok as Maeng In-sa

Home Mart

- Kim Kwang-kyu as manager Han
- Kim Hae-gon as mart director

Super Home Shopping

- Go Soo-hee as Choi Da-sung
- Lee Jun-hyeok as Han Jung-soo

Dae Han Bank

- Lee Deok-hee as Jin Mi-ja
- Kang Shin-chul as Won Joo-hwan
- Kim Jong-gu as Geum Bae-jib

Ong Ja Yeom

- Kwon Sung-deok as Ong Ah-jib
- Han Seung-hyun as Ong So-shin
- Lee Ah-ra as daughter in-law

Extended cast

- Kim Mi-kyung as Kim Sook-ja, Jung Joo-ri's mother
- Lee Ji-ha as Show host
- Tatina as Sara Siva
- Oh Chang-hoon as Park Seung-oh
- Gong Sang-ah as Son Bo-ra
- Choi In-kyung as Kang Dong-hee

=== Cameos ===
- Yang Sang-gook as car wash part-timer 1 (ep 1)
- Kim Ki-yeol as car wash part-timer 2 (ep 1)
- Heo Kyung-hwan as Chinese restaurant deliveryman (ep 1)
- Kim Joon-hyun as construction worker (ep 1)
- Kim Gi-ri as bouncer (ep 1)
- Jung Il-woo as Cha Chi-soo, Chasung Group soy sauce model (ep 3)
- Kim Byung-man as seasoned raw crab master (ep 3)
- Jung Won-joong as Jang Dae-han
- Myung Gye-nam as owner of Mother's Hand Restaurant

== Ratings ==
Episode #	Original broadcast date	Average audience share			
Episode #	Original broadcast date	TNmS Ratings		AGB Nielsen	
Episode #	Original broadcast date	Nationwide	Seoul National Capital Area	Nationwide	Seoul National Capital Area
1	1 April 2013	9.4%	9.8%	8.2%	8.9%
2	2 April 2013	9.3%	9.9%	8.6%	9.0%
3	8 April 2013	10.6%	11.8%	12.3%	12.1%
4	9 April 2013	12.2%	13.5%	12.1%	12.1%
5	15 April 2013	12.0%	12.6%	13.4%	12.5%
6	16 April 2013	13.3%	13.4%	14.2%	14.6%
7	22 April 2013	13.6%	14.9%	14.0%	14.1%
8	23 April 2013	13.2%	14.6%	14.6%	13.9%
9	29 April 2013	12.6%	13.5%	13.5%	13.2%
10	30 April 2013	13.3%	14.3%	14.5%	14.8%
11	6 May 2013	12.2%	12.8%	13.6%	13.8%
12	7 May 2013	12.8%	13.4%	14.0%	13.9%
13	13 May 2013	11.6%	11.9%	13.1%	13.8%
14	14 May 2013	11.8%	13.0%	12.8%	13.2%
15	20 May 2013	11.8%	12.8%	14.4%	16.2%
16	21 May 2013	12.8%	13.6%	14.2%	14.9%
Average		12.0%	12.9%	13.0%	13.2%

== Awards and nominations ==
Year	Award	Category	Recipient	Result
2013	6th Korea Drama Awards	Grand Prize (Daesang)	Kim Hye-soo	Nominated
2013	6th Korea Drama Awards	Best Drama	Queen of the Office	Nominated
2013	6th Korea Drama Awards	Best Production Director	Jeon Chang-geun	Nominated
2013	6th Korea Drama Awards	Excellence Award, Actor	Kim Kwang-kyu	Nominated
2013	2nd APAN Star Awards	Top Excellence Award, Actress	Kim Hye-soo	Nominated
2013	21st Korean Culture and Entertainment Awards	Grand Prize (Daesang)	Kim Hye-soo	Won
2013	21st Korean Culture and Entertainment Awards	Excellence Award, Actor in Drama	Oh Ji-ho	Won
2013	KBS Drama Awards	Grand Prize (Daesang)	Kim Hye-soo	Won
2013	KBS Drama Awards	Top Excellence Award, Actor	Oh Ji-ho	Nominated
2013	KBS Drama Awards	Top Excellence Award, Actress	Kim Hye-soo	Nominated
2013	KBS Drama Awards	Excellence Award, Actor in a Miniseries	Oh Ji-ho	Won
2013	KBS Drama Awards	Excellence Award, Actress in a Miniseries	Kim Hye-soo	Nominated
2013	KBS Drama Awards	Excellence Award, Actress in a Miniseries	Jung Yu-mi	Nominated
2013	KBS Drama Awards	Best Supporting Actor	Lee Hee-joon	Nominated
2013	KBS Drama Awards	Best Couple Award	Oh Ji-ho and Kim Hye-soo	Won
2014	7th WorldFest-Houston International Film Festival	Platinum Remi Award for Comedy TV Series	Queen of the Office	Won
2014	50th Baeksang Arts Awards	Best Actress	Kim Hye-soo	Nominated

== International broadcast ==
- It aired in Japan on cable channel KNTV from April 1 to May 21, 2013.
- It aired in Thailand on Workpoint TV from December 16, 2015, to January 16, 2016, on Tuesdays to Saturdays at 04:00-5:00 a.m.
