= Strangers 6 =

2012 Japanese-South Korean-Chinese television show

- Genre: Action; Suspense
- Starring: Toshiaki Karasawa; Oh Ji-ho; Kim Hyo-jin; Masaya Kikawada; Bowie Lam; Liu Xuan
- Theme music composer: Tomoyasu Hotei
- Countries of origin: Japan; South Korea; China
- Original languages: Japanese; Korean; Cantonese; Mandarin; English
- No. of episodes: 15

Production
- Production locations: Japan; South Korea; China
- Camera setup: Multi-camera
- Running time: 55–57 minutes

Original release
- Release: January 27 – May 4, 2012

Strangers 6 (Japanese: ストレンジャーズ6; Korean: 스트레인저 6; Chinese: 六個陌生人), is a 2012 Japanese-South Korean-Chinese co-production television series. With a budget of 1 billion yen, filming portion in Japan began on July 1, 2011. The first episode premiered in Japan on Wowow on January 27, 2012.

== Cast ==
- Toshiaki Karasawa
- Oh Ji-ho
- Kim Hyo-jin
- Masaya Kikawada
- Bowie Lam
- Liu Xuan
- Kazuki Kitamura
- Misuzu Kanno
- Suzuka Morita
- Shinzo Hotta
- Gregory Wong
- Lorena Kotô
- Terence Yin
- Kim In-seo
- Tony Ho
- Philip Keung
- Noel Leung
- Ng Chi-hung
