= Puzzle (2006 film) =

- Hangul: 두뇌유희 프로젝트, 퍼즐
- Hanja: 頭腦遊戲 프로젝트, 퍼즐
- RR: Dunoeyuhui peurojekteu, peojeul
- MR: Tunoeyuhŭi p'ŭrojekt'ŭ, p'ŏjŭl
- Directed by: Kim Tae-kyung
- Written by: Kim Tae-kyung; Yun Yeo-su
- Produced by: Choi Nak-kwon
- Starring: Joo Jin-mo; Moon Sung-keun; Hong Seok-cheon
- Cinematography: Kim Tae-seong
- Edited by: Kyung Min-ho
- Music by: Woody Kim
- Production company: Noon Entertainment
- Distributed by: Cinema Service
- Release date: September 14, 2006
- Running time: 91 minutes
- Country: South Korea
- Language: Korean
- Box office: US$1,385,630

Puzzle (Korean: 두뇌유희 프로젝트, 퍼즐) is a 2006 South Korean neo-noir crime film, the feature directorial debut of Kim Tae-kyung. A group of crooks are summoned together by an unknown master planner to carry out a bank robbery, but then it goes fatefully wrong.

== Plot ==
The film opens with an image of a man being burned alive on the floor of a warehouse. A figure, shrouded in darkness, walks away from this burning body in the down pouring rain.

Suddenly, the film cuts to two men in the middle of a bank heist who, coolly and efficiently, partake stacks of bonds from a safety deposit box. The two men with two more accomplices, along with a hostage in their trunk, drive towards some unknown location away from the city, soon to be revealed as the very warehouse in which the man was previously seen being burned alive. Upon their arrival, one of the criminals, whose name is Ryu, enters the warehouse to discover, to his horror, that the man in which they were supposed to pass the bonds off to now is a charcoaled corpse lying in the middle of the floor. The other three criminals enter as well and are shocked as well at the sight.

Questions begin to arise: what is their next plan of action? Do they wait until the mysterious man who hired them arrives, whom none of the criminals have met? Do they simply split the bonds and make a run for it? But soon the questions give way to accusations as the criminals begin to turn on one another, suspecting that one of them may, in fact, be the very man who hired them, and who must have set ablaze the now smoldering corpse.

The rest of the film is told in a series of flashbacks that explain events that led up to the bank heist, which are intercut with scenes in the present as the criminals begin to probe one another for answers to this confusing puzzle...

== Cast ==
- Joo Jin-mo - Ryu
- Moon Sung-keun - Hwan
- Hong Seok-cheon - Noh
- Kim Hyun-sung - Jung
- Park Jun-seok - Kyu
- Kim Dae-myung

== Production ==
The film crew started and completed the shooting of the film without a single word written about it, with no mention on TV or elsewhere, keeping the plot under wraps and eschewing any kind of publicity. This unconventional approach to distribution wasn't a success as it failed to generate enough viewer interest to increase its box office intake.

CJ Entertainment sold its package of Four Horror Tales and Puzzle to Blitz Entertainment for rights in Indonesia and Malaysia.

== See also ==
- Cinema of Korea
