= Love Clinic =

- Theatrical poster
- Directed by: Aaron Kim
- Written by: Lee Sang-eon; Moon Jeong-won; Yoon Pil-joon
- Produced by: Kim Dong-gyun; Lee Sang-jin
- Starring: Oh Ji-ho; Kang Ye-won
- Cinematography: Lee Hee-seob
- Edited by: Moon In-dae
- Music by: Lee Jong-soo
- Production companies: Chung Woo Film; WAW Pictures
- Distributed by: Showbox/Mediaplex
- Release date: May 7, 2015
- Running time: 101 minutes
- Country: South Korea
- Language: Korean
- Box office: US$1.5 million

Love Clinic (Korean: 연애의 맛; RR: Yeonaeui mat; lit. 'The Taste of Love') is a 2015 South Korean romantic comedy film directed by Aaron Kim, starring Oh Ji-ho and Kang Ye-won.

== Plot ==
Wang Seong-ki is a male obstetrician/gynecologist and Gil Sin-seol is a female urologist. Handsome Seong-ki is loved by all his female patients, but he secretly struggles with impotence after he fails to deliver a baby via Caesarean section. Meanwhile, the equally attractive Sin-seol is an expert on men's bodies, but is actually a virgin with an abysmal dating history. When Seong-ki opens his clinic on the same floor in the same building as Sin-seol's clinic, the two romantically challenged doctors begin to constantly bump into each other and bicker.

== Cast ==
- Oh Ji-ho as Wang Seong-ki
- Kang Ye-won as Gil Sin-seol
- Ha Joo-hee as Maeng In-young
- Kim Min-kyo as Photographer
- Hong Seok-cheon as Psychiatrist
- Kim Chang-ryul as Man on blind date
- Oh Min-suk as Owner of foreign car
- Hong Yi-joo as Ahn Gong-joo
- Lee Hyo-jung as Sin-seol's father
- Hong Yeo-jin as Sin-seol's mother
- Han Seong-sik as Kim Young-chul
- Ji Yoon-ho as Ahn Gong-joo's high school student

== Reception ==
Love Clinic was released on May 7, 2015, and opened in fourth place at the South Korean box office. By its third week, it has grossed ₩1.65 billion (US$1.52 million) from 204,000 admissions.
