= Madame Antoine: The Love Therapist =

2016 South Korean TV series

- Promotional poster
- Genre: Romance; Comedy
- Written by: Hong Jin-ah
- Directed by: Kim Yun-cheol
- Starring: Han Ye-seul; Sung Joon; Jeong Jin-woon; Lee Joo-hyung; Hwang Seung-eon; Chang Mi-hee
- Country of origin: South Korea
- Original language: Korean
- No. of episodes: 16 episodes

Production
- Executive producer: Oh Sung-min
- Production company: GnG Productions

Original release
- Network: JTBC
- Release: January 22 – March 12, 2016

Madame Antoine: The Love Therapist (Korean: 마담 앙트완; RR: Madam Angteuwan; lit. Madame Antoine) is a 2016 South Korean television series starring Han Ye-seul, Sung Joon and Jeong Jin-woon. The series was originally scheduled to air on JTBC on November 27, 2015 but was delayed and premiered on January 22, 2016.

== Synopsis ==
Go Hye-rim (Han Ye-seul) is a fortune teller and café owner who goes by the name of Madame Antoine. She claims her fortune-telling abilities are based on a spiritual connection with the famous French queen Marie Antoinette. By her own admission, she has no such royal connection, but she is skilled at reader and has a knack for following up on hunches and picking up on detail.

Choi Soo-hyun (Sung Joon) is a psychotherapist specializing in women's psychology and is known as the 'Soul Doctor' to Hollywood stars. Although his Stanford professorship and good looks make him a highly eligible bachelor, his past research and life experience have left him skeptical that true love actually does exist. Choi Soo-hyun moves into the space above Go Hye-rim's café and sets up practice, where he designs an experiment intending to prove his hypothesis about the nature of true love. His decision to name his practice Madame Antoine leads to a disagreement with Go Hye-rim, whom he then tricks into taking part in his experiment.

== Cast ==
- Han Ye-seul as Go Hye-rim

Go Hye-rim is a con-artist and fortune-teller in her early 30s. She runs a cafe called "Madame Antoine", where she makes people believe that she has special connections with the ghost of Marie Antoinette. She cons people so that she can pay for daughter's tuition. She despises Soo-hyun for opening a psychological center above her cafe, coincidentally named "Madame Antoine". She believes people will misunderstand between her cafe & fortune telling place and Soo-hyun psychology center. Even though her job is just deceiving people, she has a good talent on observing things.

- Sung Joon as Choi Soo-hyun
  - Choi Seung-hoon as young Soo-hyun

Choi Soo-hyun is a man in his 30s and a psychology professor from Stanford University. He has a cold personality and doesn't believe in love. He opens a psychology center on the 2nd floor above Go Hye-rim's cafe. He decides to secretly use her in his experiment (also called Madame Antoine) on how women truly feel about love. Although, the experiment is about a woman falling in love with one of the 3 suitors (including Soo-hyun) he eagerly wants Hye-rim to fall in love with him in revenge for her being rude towards him. He plays the rich man in his 30s for the experiment.

- Jeong Jin-woon as Choi Seung-chan

Seung-chan is a former rookie rising baseball star and the younger half-brother of Choi Soo-hyun. After he quits playing baseball, he decides to move in with his older brother after hearing Soo-hyun came back from America. Initially, his brother rejects him from staying with him, but then agrees to let him in if Seung-chan takes part in his experiment "Madame Antoine" while competing with Soo-hyun and Ji-ho in return. He plays the role of a man with an athlete vibe in his 20s for the experiment.

- Lee Joo-hyung as Won Ji-ho

Won Ji-ho is a genius that has an IQ of 210. Because of his lack in communication and understanding to people, he decides to go to psychology field and become Soo-hyun's student. He is a very innocent guy, also behaves stiff and childlike. He was ordered by Soo-hyun to become a part of the experiment "Madame Antoine" where he competes with Soo-hyun and Seung-chan for Hye-rim's heart. He ends up liking Go Yoo-rim. He plays the role of the flower-boy in his 20s for the experiment.

- Hwang Seung-eon as Go Yoo-rim

Go Yoo-rim is Hye-rim's little sister who works as a camera lady and also helps at her sister's cafe. At first, she helps Ji-ho into getting her older sister fall in with him but ends up falling for him herself. Thus, she becomes jealous of Hye-rim. She takes advantage of Ji-ho's innocence and childlike behavior, by "teaching him how to ..."

- Chang Mi-hee as Bae Mi-ran

She is psychologist in her old age. After her plan of retiring from jobs, she decided to work on 'Madame Antoine' center after she met Seung-chan when she pays a visit to the center as Soo-hyun supervisor. A feeling of being youth comes back again after she met Seung-chan and cheering her up.

- Byun Hee-bong as President Kim

He is a successful CEO of a big cosmetics company, he is also the owner of the building Hye-rim and Soo-hyun work in. Hye-rim thought President Kim is just an average old landlord but find out that he's a rich man. He seems amused by Hye-rim talent at observing on things and her job as a fortune teller. He is very nice to Hye-rim and helps her whenever she needs him.

- Shin Hyun-been as Claire

=== Special appearances ===
- Kim Jae-kyung as Jyu-ni

She is A singer who happens to be dependent people's attention, she gets jealous of Hye-rim because she gets to enjoy herself with 3 good looking guys in 'Madame Antoine' center.

- Lee Sun-bin as Ma-ri

She is the South Korea representative as a gymnastic athlete. She almost lost her ability to see after she received many hates from the anti-fans.

- Go Joo-won as Hye-rim's ex-husband

He divorced Hye-rim because he didn't feel happy with her anymore and already found a new woman. Now, he lives with his new wife and Hye-rim's daughter in America.

- Tae In-ho as Kang Tae-hwa (ep. 11-12)
- Lee Jin-kwon as Cameo

== Ratings ==
In this table, the blue numbers represent the lowest ratings and the red numbers represent the highest ratings.

Ep.	Original broadcast date	Average audience share	
Ep.	Original broadcast date	AGB Nielsen	TNmS
Ep.	Original broadcast date	Nationwide	Nationwide
1	January 22, 2016	0.880%	0.6%
2	January 23, 2016	0.886%	0.6%
3	January 29, 2016	1.053%	0.6%
4	January 30, 2016	0.730%	0.6%
5	February 5, 2016	1.058%	0.6%
6	February 6, 2016	0.657%	0.5%
7	February 12, 2016	0.991%	0.7%
8	February 13, 2016	0.548%	0.5%
9	February 19, 2016	0.60%	0.6%
10	February 20, 2016	0.516%	0.5%
11	February 26, 2016	0.614%	0.7%
12	February 27, 2016	0.663%	0.3%
13	March 4, 2016	0.743%	0.6%
14	March 5, 2016	0.475%	0.3%
15	March 11, 2016	0.483%	0.5%
16	March 12, 2016	0.503%	0.5%
Average		0.713%	0.5%

- This drama airs on a cable channel/pay TV which normally has a relatively smaller audience compared to free-to-air TV/public broadcasters (KBS, SBS, MBC and EBS).

== Awards and nominations ==
Year	Award	Category	Nominee	Result
2016	9th Korea Drama Awards	Excellence Award, Actress	Han Ye-seul	Nominated
