= Overboard (1987 film) =

1987 film by Garry Marshall

- Theatrical release poster
- Directed by: Garry Marshall
- Written by: Leslie Dixon
- Produced by: Anthea Sylbert; Alexandra Rose
- Starring: Goldie Hawn; Kurt Russell; Edward Herrmann; Katherine Helmond; Roddy McDowall
- Cinematography: John A. Alonzo
- Edited by: Dov Hoenig; Sonny Baskin
- Music by: Alan Silvestri
- Production companies: Metro-Goldwyn-Mayer; Star Partners Ltd.
- Distributed by: MGM/UA Distribution Co.
- Release date: December 16, 1987
- Running time: 112 minutes
- Country: United States
- Language: English
- Budget: $22 million
- Box office: $26.7 million

Overboard is a 1987 American romantic comedy film directed by Garry Marshall, written by Leslie Dixon, starring Goldie Hawn and Kurt Russell, and executive produced by Roddy McDowall, who also co-stars alongside Edward Herrmann and Katherine Helmond. The film follows a spoiled, wealthy socialite who develops amnesia after falling from her yacht while vacationing on the Oregon Coast, only to be taken in by the working-class carpenter whom she mistreated.

The film's soundtrack was composed by Alan Silvestri while the Wright Brothers music used in the film was produced by Gary S. Paxton in Nashville, TN. Although it opened to mixed reviews, it was a box office success. Overboard is considered a classic by some, and has been remade several times. In 1992, it was adapted in the Indian film Ek Ladka Ek Ladki, in 2006, it was adapted into the South Korean television series Couple or Trouble, and in 2018, it was remade with Anna Faris and Eugenio Derbez in reversed roles. The plot of the 1997 Malayalam film Mayaponman is loosely based on this film.

== Plot ==
Joanna Mintz Stayton is a snobbish socialite accustomed to a life of luxury alongside her henpecked husband Grant Stayton III. While waiting for her yacht to be repaired in the fictional fishing village of Elk Cove, Tillamook County, Oregon, Joanna hires carpenter Dean Proffitt, a widower with four sons, to remodel her closet. Dean produces quality work, which she dismisses because he used oak instead of cedar, although she never specifically requested this.

Dean agrees to redo the closet if he is paid for the work he has already done, but Joanna refuses to pay him. The two have an argument, resulting in Joanna angrily throwing Dean and his tool kit overboard. Upon arriving home, he is met by his sons' principal, who threatens to involve social services, as his sons are undisciplined and struggle in school. Dean, however, is more interested in having fun with his friends than being an attentive parent.

That night, as the yacht sails away, Joanna goes on deck to retrieve her wedding ring, but loses her balance and falls overboard. She is later fished out of the water by a garbage scow. Joanna is taken to the local hospital, suffering from temporary amnesia, although her vindictive, selfish personality remains unchanged.

Grant eventually learns what happened. Intending to have her fortune to himself, and wanting to get rid of her, he claims he doesn't recognize Joanna, and abandons her in the hospital so that he can party on the yacht with younger women.

After seeing Joanna's story on the news, Dean seeks revenge by having her work off her unpaid bill. He goes to the hospital and claims that she is his wife and the mother of his sons. She reluctantly goes home with him and is appalled by the family's ramshackle residence. Joanna initially has difficulty dealing with Dean's rebellious sons and the household chores, but soon adapts. As she masters her responsibilities, she learns about the boys' school and family issues, and that Dean is secretly working two jobs to make ends meet. She streamlines the money problems with more efficient budgeting and persuades Dean to be a more responsible father.

Joanna makes Dean's dream come true by helping him design a miniature golf course. He, however, does not disclose her real identity, fearing that she will leave.

Two months later, Joanna's mother Edith grows suspicious of her daughter's disappearance and threatens to have Grant hunted down. He is forced to return to retrieve Joanna, whose memory is restored upon seeing him.

Realizing that she was manipulated, a distraught Joanna returns with Grant to her yacht, which heads for New York, though she is appalled by how rudely Grant and Edith treat the staff. She apologizes to her butler Andrew and the crew for her spiteful treatment towards them, and soon realizes how happy she was with Dean and his sons, prompting her to turn the yacht back towards Elk Cove.

The next morning, Grant discovers that Joanna has changed course, and after she tells him she does not love him, he takes charge of the boat.

Dean and the boys arrive on a Coast Guard cutter to rescue Joanna, but are called away due to a sighting of salmon poachers. He runs to the back of the boat and calls out to Joanna. He then jumps into the water to swim to her, and she does the same. Grant furiously takes aim at Joanna with a bow and arrow, only to be booted overboard by Andrew. Joanna reveals to Dean that the yacht and money are hers and not Grant's.

Joanna and Dean are then brought on board the Coast Guard boat, and Dean's sons start making out their Christmas lists. Dean asks Joanna what he could possibly give her that she does not already have. She answers, "A little girl", and they kiss.

== Cast ==
- Goldie Hawn as Joanna Stayton / Annie Proffitt
- Kurt Russell as Dean Proffitt, Annie's fake husband whom she eventually falls in love with.
- Edward Herrmann as Grant Stayton III, Joanna (Annie's) real husband who abandons her.
- Katherine Helmond as Edith Mintz, Joanna's mother
- Michael Hagerty as Billy Pratt, Dean's best friend
- Roddy McDowall as Andrew, Joanna's butler
- Jared Rushton as Charlie Proffitt, Dean's middle second son and Greg's fraternal twin brother
- Jeffrey Wiseman as Joey Proffitt, Dean's youngest fourth son
- Brian Price as Travis Proffitt, Dean's oldest first son
- Jamie Wild as Greg Proffitt, Dean's middle third son and Charlie's fraternal twin brother
- Frank Campanella as Captain Karl
- Frank Buxton as Wilbur Budd
- Ray Combs as the cop at the hospital
- Wright Brothers Band as themselves
- Héctor Elizondo as garbage scow skipper (uncredited)
- Sven-Ole Thorsen as Olaf (uncredited)
- Garry Marshall as drummer (uncredited)

Russell and Hawn's infant son Wyatt makes his debut as a baby in a golf course.

== Production ==
Principal photography of Overboard largely took place at Raleigh Studios in Los Angeles, as well as Fort Bragg and Mendocino, California, with additional photography in Newport, Oregon.

== Release ==
=== Box office ===
The film made $1.9 million in its first weekend, $2.9 million in its second (+34%), and $3.9 million in its third (+54%), totaling $26.7 million by the end of its run.

=== Critical response ===
On the review aggregator website Rotten Tomatoes, the film holds an approval rating of 46% based on 35 reviews, with an average rating of 5.2/10. The website's critics consensus reads, "Goldie Hawn and Kurt Russell's comedic chops elevate waterlogged material, but not even their buoyant chemistry can keep Overboard's creepy concept afloat." On Metacritic, which assigns a weighted average score out of 100 to reviews from mainstream critics, the film received an average score of 53, based on 13 critics, indicating "mixed or average" reviews. Audiences polled by CinemaScore gave the film an average grade of "A−" on an A+ to F scale.

Variety praised Hawn's performance, but called the film "an uninspiring, unsophisticated attempt at an updated screwball comedy that is brought down by plodding script and a handful of too broadly drawn characters." Rita Kempley of The Washington Post called it "a deeply banal farce" with "one-dimensional characters, a good long look at her buttocks and lots of pathetic sex jokes." Roger Ebert rated the film three out of four stars; while calling it predictable, he wrote: "the things that make it special, however, are the genuine charm, wit and warm energy generated by the entire cast and director Garry Marshall." Michael Wilmington of the Los Angeles Times' wrote: "The film tries to mix the two 1930s movie comedy strains: screwball romance and populist fable. But there's something nerveless and thin about it. Hawn and Russell are good, but their scenes together have a calculated spontaneity—overcute, obvious."

The film is considered a classic by some.

=== Home media ===
CBS/Fox Video released Overboard on VHS in North America in 1988. In Canada, it was among the top 10 video rentals in the country in July of that year. MGM Home Entertainment first released a DVD edition of the film in 1999. A Blu-ray was released by MGM in 2009.

In 2021, Severin Films reissued the film on DVD and Blu-ray from a new 2K master.

== Remakes ==
A reimagined film of the same name, starring Anna Faris and Eugenio Derbez, was released on May 4, 2018. The main roles are reversed from the 1987 original. Derbez portrays a wealthy man who falls off of his yacht and is found by Faris' character, a single mother who convinces him that he is her husband.

It has been loosely adaptated in India into the 1992 Hindi film Ek Ladka Ek Ladki, directed by Vijay Sadanah and starring Salman Khan and Neelam Kothari and the 1997 Malayalam film Mayaponman.

The 2006 South Korean television show Couple or Trouble, starring Han Ye-seul and Oh Ji-ho and directed by Kim Sang Ho, is also a loose adaptation of the film.

The 2012 Swiss film Liebe und Andere Unfälle is another loose adaptation of the film. The 2013 Russian miniseries Wife Rented (Zhena naprokat, Жена напрокат) is also a loose adaptation of the film.

There's also an Egyptian uncredited remake titled Mecanica (ميكانيكا) starring Nelli and Youcef Mansour.

== See also ==
- Mithya
- Swept Away (1974 film)
