= Miss Gold Digger =

- Theatrical poster
- Hangul: 용의주도 미스 신
- Hanja: 用意周到 미스 신
- RR: Yonguijudo miseu Sin
- MR: Yongŭijudo misŭ Sin
- Directed by: Park Yong-jip
- Written by: Park Eun-yeong
- Produced by: Cha Seung-jae; Kim Mi-hee; Choi Sun-joong; Im Choong-ryul; Yoon Sang-oh
- Starring: Han Ye-seul; Lee Jong-hyuk
- Cinematography: Kim Hak-soo
- Edited by: Park Gok-ji
- Music by: Jo Yeong-wook
- Distributed by: Sidus FNH; Road Pictures
- Release date: December 18, 2007
- Running time: 108 minutes
- Country: South Korea
- Language: Korean
- Box office: US$3,948,507

Miss Gold Digger (Korean: 용의주도 미스 신; lit. 'Prudent Miss Shin') is a 2007 South Korean romantic comedy film.

== Plot ==
Shin Mi-soo is juggling relationships with four different men, adopting a different persona for each one. But her love life becomes increasingly tangled, and the men show their true colors when they find out how they've been manipulated.

== Cast ==
- Han Ye-seul as Shin Mi-soo
- Lee Jong-hyuk as Dong-min
- Kwon Oh-joong as Joon-seo
- Kim In-kwon as Yoon-cheol
- Son Ho-young as Hyeon-joon
- Jeong Gyoo-soo as Mr. Choi
- Yoo Eun-jeong as Yeong-mi
- Oh Seo-won as Hye-jeong
- Jo Hye-jin as Mi-soo's friend
- Park Hyeon-jin as Yoo-jin
- Jeong Da-yeong as Dong-hee
- Jeong Hae-soo as Yeong-mi's husband
- Lee Won-jae as Vice manager
- Yoo Soon-cheol as Monk
- Park Joon-mook as Kid at apartment
- Ban Hye-ra as Woman at apartment
- Lee Jeong-hak as Squad leader
- Kang Rae-yeon as Yang Dae-ri (cameo)
- Lee Jae-hoon as Drunken man (cameo)
- Im Ye-jin as Mi-soo's mother (cameo)
- Chun Ho-jin as Mi-soo's father (cameo)
- Yoon Joo-sang as Dong-min's father (cameo)
- Hong Yeo-jin as Dong-min's mother (cameo)
