= Joo Jin-mo (actor, born 1974) =

South Korean actor

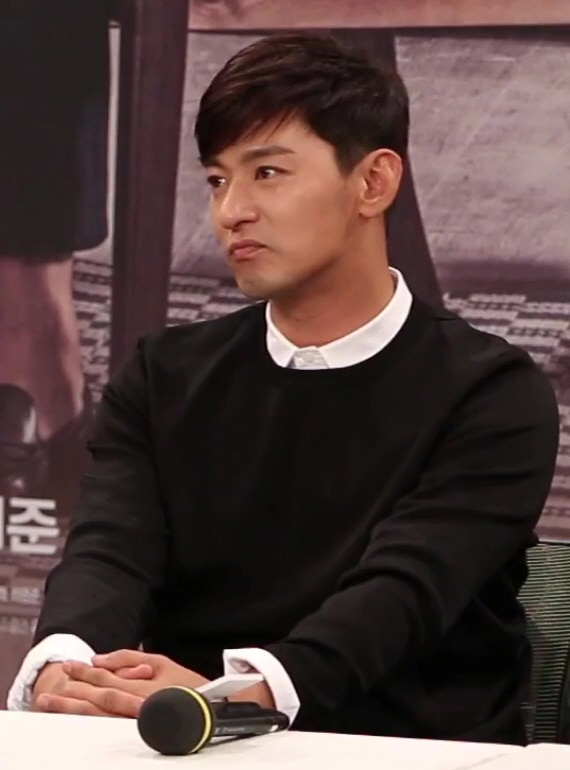
- Joo in 2016
- Born: Park Jin-tae; 11 August 1974 (age 52); Seoul, South Korea
- Occupation: Actor
- Years active: 1999–2019
- Agent: intimeent
- Spouse: Min Hye-yeon (m. 2019)

Korean name
- Hangul: 박진태
- RR: Bak Jintae
- MR: Pak Chint'ae

Stage name
- Hangul: 주진모
- RR: Ju Jinmo
- MR: Chu Chinmo

Joo Jin-mo (born Park Jin-tae on 11 August 1974), is a South Korean actor. He is best known for his leading roles in the films Happy End (1999) in which he won Grand Bell Awards for Best Supporting Actor, 200 Pounds Beauty (2006), and A Frozen Flower (2008) in which he won Baeksang Arts Awards for Best Actor, as well as the television series Empress Ki (2013).

== Background ==
Born in Seoul, South Korea as Park Jin-tae, he borrowed his manager's name "Joo Jin-mo" for his stage name when he began his acting career.

== Career ==
After appearing in TV dramas and some minor roles in film, Joo was first cast as a lead in Dance Dance in 1999, for which he underwent extensive dance training. Although the film itself did not perform well, it gave Joo some publicity before he broke through with the box-office and critical hit Happy End. His role as a spurned lover in this psycho-drama attracted considerable notice in Korea, and the film itself also traveled to Hong Kong.

After taking the lead in Kim Ki-duk's mildly experimental Real Fiction (which was shot in 3.5 hours without any retakes), Joo took a major role in the much-hyped Musa, set in 14th-century China and starring Zhang Ziyi from Crouching Tiger, Hidden Dragon. He also acted in Wanee & Junah, a melodrama about a screenwriter and an animator opposite Kim Hee-sun.

After some films he had been cast in were cancelled due to lack of financing, Joo did the 2003 boxing drama Punch with Shin Min-ah, then returned to the big screen in 2004, in the comedy Liar based on the play Run for Your Wife by Ray Cooney.

From 2004 to early 2005, Joo filmed the epic wuxia historical drama Bichunmoo ("Dance in the Sky"), but due to copyright issues with Korean broadcasters, it aired first in China and Taiwan in 2006. It was finally shown on Korean television in 2008, though SBS edited down the original 33 episodes into 14.

Meanwhile, Joo and Lee Yo-won's 2005 TV series Fashion 70's received good ratings of 30%. In 2006 he starred in Puzzle about a bank robbery gone wrong, and opposite Kim Ah-joong in the hugely popular romantic comedy 200 Pounds Beauty. The Kwak Kyung-taek gangster romance A Love co-starring Park Si-yeon followed in 2007.

A Frozen Flower, Yoo Ha's controversial 2008 film which revolved around the love triangle between a homosexual Goryeo king (Joo), his queen (Song Ji-hyo), and the royal guard (Jo In-sung) they're both in love with, won Joo his first Best Actor trophy at the 45th Baeksang Arts Awards.

He played a sports agent to a K-1 fighter in the 2009 TV series Dream, but it received low ratings for sharing the same timeslot as Queen Seondeok. The year after, Joo and Hallyu star Song Seung-heon appeared in A Better Tomorrow, the 2010 Korean remake of John Woo's classic Hong Kong noir film. Joo was ranked fourth in CNNGo's "South Korea's Top 20 Hottest Male Celebs."

Joo first sang "Like Rain, Like Music" by late singer Kim Hyun-sik during his first fan meeting in Japan at the Nakano Sun Plaza in Tokyo. He later released his cover of "Like Rain, Like Music" as a digital single in September 2011. Joo also starred in the accompanying music video with Go Joon-hee.

In 2012's Gabi (the antiquated local term for "coffee"), Joo played a late 19th-century international con man who becomes embroiled in the espionage and political conspiracy surrounding King Gojong. In making the role his own, Joo said he enjoyed the depth of his participation in the creative process with director Chang Yoon-hyun. He said he is still waiting for a new role, a complete departure from the brooding masculinity he has come to be equated with. "All male actors dream of playing macho men at one point or another, but they also dream of playing emotionally complex roles. I'm the same," Joo said at a press conference.

Joo and Ruby Lin starred in the 42-episode Chinese TV drama Flowers in Fog based on the novel by Qiong Yao (the title 花非花雾非雾 literally translates to "Flower is Not Flower, Fog is Not Fog"). It was shot in France, and aired on Hunan TV in 2013. He then returned to the Goryeo era to play a fictional character based on King Chunghye in Empress Ki, a historical drama with Ha Ji-won in the title role.

On the big screen, Joo reunited with director Kwak Kyung-taek for Friend: The Great Legacy, the sequel to the 2001 hit film. Joo plays a gangster in 1963, the father of Yoo Oh-sung's character in the original movie.

Jo made his theater debut in a 2015 staging of the musical Gone with the Wind, adapted from Margaret Mitchell's novel. Joo said, "Rhett Butler is a character every actor would dream to play." This was followed by melodrama series This is My Love with Kim Sa-rang (actress) on cable channel jTBC.

In November 2016, Joo signed with new management agency Huayi Brothers. He next played in the series Woman with a Suitcase, followed by Bad Guys 2 in 2017, and Big Issue in 2019.

On 3 January 2022, it was reported that Joo had terminated his contract with Studio Santa Claus Entertainment.

== Personal life ==
Joo married doctor Min Hye-yeon on 1 June 2019, in Jeju Island. Min is a Seoul National University graduate who specializes in family medicine. She has appeared on various health-related TV programs, in which she gained popularity and often dubbed as "Kim Tae-hee of the medical world."

=== Legal case ===
In January 2020, Joo revealed that he was a victim of phone hacking and was being blackmailed after several personal messages shared between Joo and his close actor friend appeared on an online community board on 10 January 2020. The messages allegedly included pictures of women and vulgar comments made by the two men about the women in the pictures. Joo's agency has reported the case to authorities. Investigation is ongoing. He also apologized to the women mentioned in the messages.

== Filmography ==
=== Film ===
Year	Title	Role
1999	Dance Dance	Jun-young
1999	Happy End	Kim Il-beom
2000	Real Fiction	Kim Han-sik
2001	Musa: The Warrior	Choi Jung
2001	Wanee & Junah	Jun-ha
2004	Liar	Jeong Man-cheol
2006	Puzzle	Ryu
2006	200 Pounds Beauty	Han Sang-jun
2007	A Love	Chae In-ho
2008	A Frozen Flower	King Gongmin
2010	A Better Tomorrow	Kim Hyuk
2012	Gabi	Ilyich
2013	Friend: The Great Legacy	Lee Chul-joo

=== Television series ===
Year	Title	Role	Notes	Ref.
1999	Sad Temptation	Shin Joon-young		
2000	Look Back in Anger	Lee Dong-hoon		
2003	Punch	Lee Han-sae		
2005	Fashion 70s	Kim Dong-young		
2006	Queen of the Game	Lee Shin-jeon / Chase		
2006	Bicheonmu	Liu Zhen He (Yoo Jin-ha)		
2009	Dream	Nam Je-il		
2013	Flowers in Fog	Qi Yuan	Chinese television drama	
2013	Empress Ki	Wang Yoo		
2015	This is My Love	Ji Eun-ho / Park Hyun-soo		
2016	Woman with a Suitcase	Ham Bok-geo		
2017	Bad Guys 2	Heo Il-hoo		
2019	Big Issue	Han Seok-joo		

== Theater ==
Year	Title	Role
1997	Taxi Driver	
2015	Gone with the Wind	Rhett Butler

== Discography ==
Album information	Track listing
Like Rain, Like Music: Single; Released: 9 September 2011; Label: CJ E&M	Track listing: 1. 비처럼 음악처럼 (Like Rain, Like Music); 2. 비처럼 음악처럼 (Like Rain, Like Music) (Inst.)

== Awards and nominations ==
Year	Award	Category	Nominated work	Result
2000	36th Baeksang Arts Awards	Best New Actor (TV)	Sad Temptation	Nominated
2000	37th Grand Bell Awards	Best Supporting Actor	Happy End	Won
2000	37th Grand Bell Awards	Best New Actor	Happy End	Nominated
2000	KBS Drama Awards	Best New Actor	Look Back in Anger	Won
2003	SBS Drama Awards	Excellence Award, Actor in a Drama Special	Punch	Won
2005	SBS Drama Awards	Excellence Award, Actor in a Special Planning Drama	Fashion 70's	Nominated
2005	SBS Drama Awards	Top 10 Stars	Fashion 70's	Won
2007	28th Blue Dragon Film Awards	Best Actor	A Love	Nominated
2007	28th Blue Dragon Film Awards	Popular Star Award	A Love	Won
2007	6th Korean Film Awards	Best Actor	A Love	Nominated
2009	45th Baeksang Arts Awards	Best Actor (Film)	A Frozen Flower	Won
2010	3rd Style Icon Awards	Style Icon Award, Movie Actor	A Better Tomorrow	Won
2013	MBC Drama Awards	Excellence Award, Actor in a Special Project Drama	Empress Ki	Won
2013	MBC Drama Awards	Netizen Popularity Award	Empress Ki	Nominated
2013	MBC Drama Awards	Best Couple Award with Ha Ji-won	Empress Ki	Nominated
2014	3rd APAN Star Awards	Top Excellence Award, Actor in a Serial Drama	Empress Ki	Nominated
2016	MBC Drama Awards	Top Excellence Award, Actor in a Special Project Drama	Woman with a Suitcase	Nominated
2019	SBS Drama Awards	Top Excellence Award, Actor in a Miniseries	Big Issue	Nominated
