= Dream (TV series) =

South Korean television series

- Genre: Romance; Sports
- Written by: Jung Hyung-soo
- Directed by: Baek Soo-chan
- Starring: Joo Jin-mo; Kim Bum
- Ending theme: "Countdown" by SHINee
- Country of origin: South Korea
- No. of episodes: 20

Production
- Running time: Mondays and Tuesdays at 21:55 (KST)

Original release
- Network: Seoul Broadcasting System
- Release: 27 July – 29 September 2009

Dream (Korean: 드림) is a 2009 South Korean television series that follows the lives of a sports agent and K-1 fighters. Starring Joo Jin-mo, Kim Bum, and Son Dam-bi in her acting debut, it aired on SBS from July 27 to September 29, 2009 on Mondays and Tuesdays at 21:55 for 20 episodes.

== Plot ==
Nam Jae-il is a successful sports agent with some famous clients, but when one of his baseball stars gets involved in a drug case, he loses everything. But when the miserable Nam befriends former pickpocket and aspiring K-1 fighter Lee Jang-seok, and tomboyish taebo instructor Park So-yeon, he decides to regain his glory by making Lee a star.

== Cast ==
- Joo Jin-mo as Nam Jae-il
- Kim Bum as Lee Jang-seok
- Son Dam-bi as Park So-yeon
- Park Sang-won as Kang Kyung-taek
- Choi Yeo-jin as Jang Soo-jin
- Oh Dal-su as Lee Young-chul
- Lee Ah-hyun as Jung Geum-ja
- Lee Ki-young as Park Byung-sam
- Lee Hoon as Park Jung-chul
- Yoo Hye-jung as Kim Sam-soon
- Yoo Yeon-seok as Noh Chul-joong
- Park Nam-hyun as Go Kwang-pal
- Kim Woong as Maeng Do-pil
- Ko Chang-seok as "Straw"
- Lee So-jung as Jae-shi
- Hong Ah-reum as Song Yu-ri
- Chung Lim as "Achilles"
- Marco as "Apollo"
- Hyun Woo as "Narcissus"
- Julien Kang as "David"
- Bae Jung-nam as "Poseidon"
- Jo Jae-yoon as Gal-chi

== Soundtrack ==
Dream OST

Soundtrack album by various artists
- Released: August 3, 2009
- Genres: K-pop, Soundtrack
- Language: Korean
- Labels: Forest Media/kt music KTMCD-0030

Singles from Dream
- 1. "Countdown" Released: July 31, 2009

1. Countdown – Shinee
2. 죽기 아니면 살기 (Live Or Die) – Bobby Kim
3. Love Is Crying - Seo Young-eun
4. Always – Someday
5. Moonlight – Yoon Hwa Jae In
6. Run – Lee Hyun-wook
7. 눈물을 삼켜 (Tears and Swallow) – Kan Jong-wook
8. And Now - PSW
9. Take Me - J.Y
10. Lonely Dream - Oh Joon-sung
11. Force The Game - Choi Wan-hee
12. Breakdown – Choi Wan-hee
13. White Dream - Choi Wan-hee
14. Jerry's Theme - Choi Wan-hee
15. Distorted Face - Ha Geun-young
