= Han Ye-seul =

South Korean actress (born 1981)

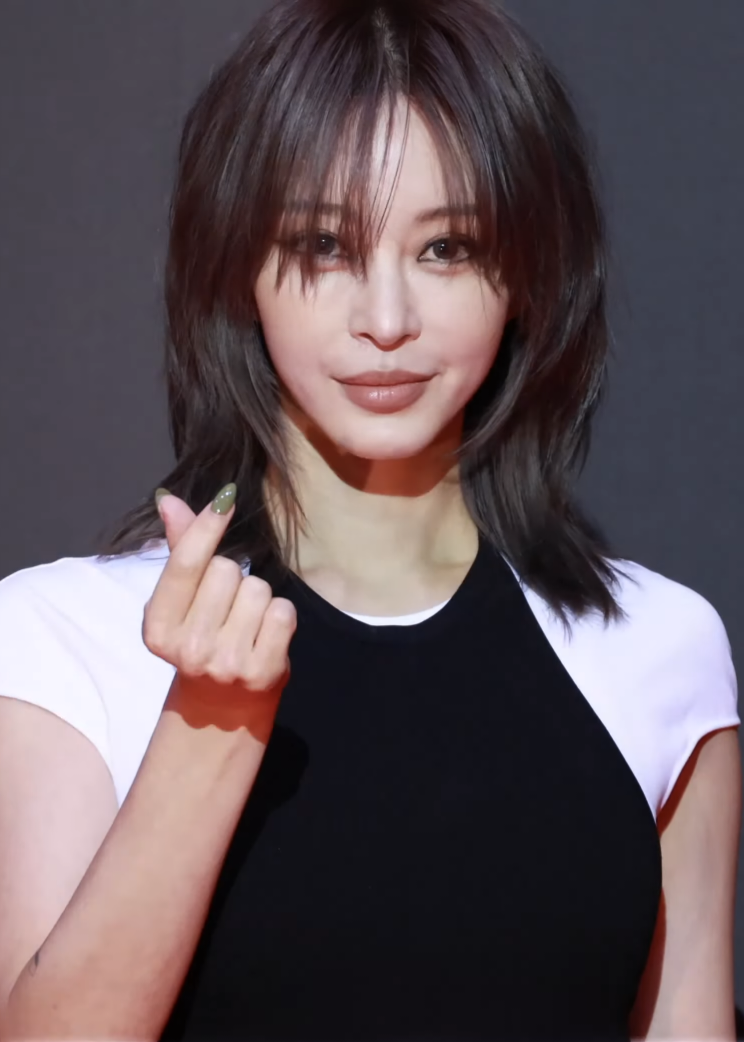
- Han in February 2024
- Born: Leslie Kim; September 18, 1981 (age 45); Los Angeles, California, U.S.
- Citizenship: South Korea; United States (until 2004)
- Occupation: Actress
- Years active: 2001–present
- Agent: High Entertainment
- Spouse: Ryu Sung-jae (m. 2024)

Korean name
- Hangul: 한예슬
- RR: Han Yeseul
- MR: Han Yesŭl

Han Ye-seul (Korean: 한예슬; born Leslie Kim, September 18, 1981) is a South Korean actress. She made her acting debut in the sitcom Nonstop 4 (2003), and has since played leading roles in television dramas such as Couple or Trouble (2006), Tazza (2008), and Birth of a Beauty (2014), as well as the films Miss Gold Digger (2007) and Penny Pinchers (2011).

== Early life ==
Leslie Kim was born and raised in Los Angeles, California. She attended Cerritos High School and graduated from Cerritos College with an associate degree in Computer Graphics. She is fluent in both English and Korean.

== Career ==
=== Acting debut ===
She began her modeling career in South Korea after winning the SBS Supermodel Contest in 2001. Under the stage name Han Ye-seul, she made her acting debut in the popular sitcom Nonstop 4 in 2003. Han quickly rose to fame, and she renounced her U.S. citizenship in 2004 and became a naturalized South Korean citizen to continue establishing herself in Korean entertainment. Her performances in Forbidden Love (2004) and That Summer's Typhoon (2005) received poor reviews, with critics dismissing her as primarily a commercial model and not a real actress.

=== Breakthrough ===
Han proved her detractors wrong with Couple or Trouble (also known as Fantasy Couple, 2006), a remake of Overboard written by the Hong sisters. Playing a spoiled heiress who becomes an amnesiac after a yacht accident, Han was praised for her comic timing and the series was a hit.

She further embraced the screwball comedy genre with her first film Miss Gold Digger (2007). Despite the film's lackluster box office, Han's portrayal of an advertising executive who juggles four different men in order to catch the ideal husband won her several Best New Actress accolades from local award-giving bodies, including the prestigious Grand Bell Awards and Blue Dragon Film Awards.

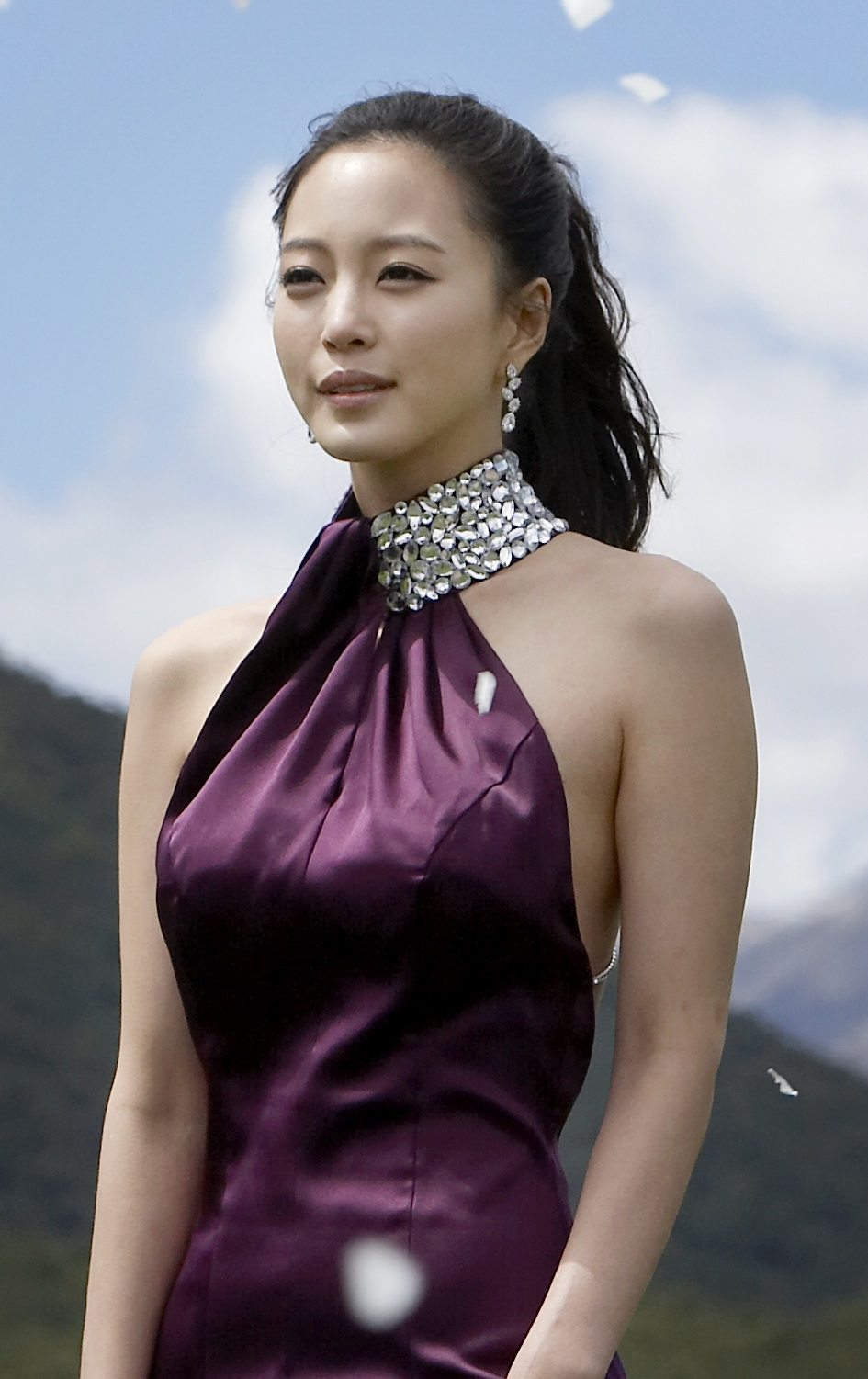
Han in 2008

Han next starred in Tazza (2008), a TV adaptation of Huh Young-man's manhwa of the same name about gamblers and card sharks. This was followed up with the Lee Kyung-hee-penned Will It Snow for Christmas?, a melodrama about childhood sweethearts who reunite as adults in 2009.

=== Spy Myung-wol controversy ===
In 2011, Han was cast as the titular character in Spy Myung-wol, as a North Korean agent on a mission to kidnap a top South Korean Hallyu star, who ends up falling for him. The series gained notoriety when Han failed to show up for her scheduled filming on August 14–15 and instead flew to Los Angeles on August 16; it was the first instance of a leading actor abruptly leaving in the middle of a Korean drama shoot. Her then-agency SidusHQ cited conflicts with television director Hwang In-hyuk over her hectic working conditions, and that exhaustion had compromised her judgment. Han's absence effectively halted production, and the KBS network lambasted her actions as "unilateral, irresponsible and will not be tolerated," while the drama's production company Victory Contents (then known as Victory Productions) threatened legal action. After extensive press coverage, Han returned to Korea and continued filming Spy Myung-wol on August 18. Upon arrival at Incheon International Airport, she apologized but maintained that her demands had been legitimate, stating "I want to believe that I did the right thing." Han drew harsh criticism from TV industry professionals and viewers, but some fans defended her, saying the stressful Korean drama live-shoot system was at fault.

Romantic comedy film Penny Pinchers was released two months after Spy Myung-wol finished airing. In it, Han shed her glamorous image to play an extremely frugal woman who considers love a frivolous expense and teaches an unemployed playboy the art of penny pinching.

=== Comeback ===
After the Spy Myung-wol fiasco, public backlash forced Han to go on a three-year hiatus from acting.

In late 2014, she made a successful comeback in Birth of a Beauty, where Han played a warm-hearted ajumma who overcomes her husband's infidelity by undergoing a head-to-toe makeover involving plastic surgery and weight loss. This was followed with leading roles in romantic comedies Madame Antoine: The Love Therapist (2016) where she plays a fake fortune teller, and 20th Century Boy and Girl (2017).

In 2019, Han starred in SBS drama Big Issue, playing a paparazzi journalist who chases after celebrity scandals.

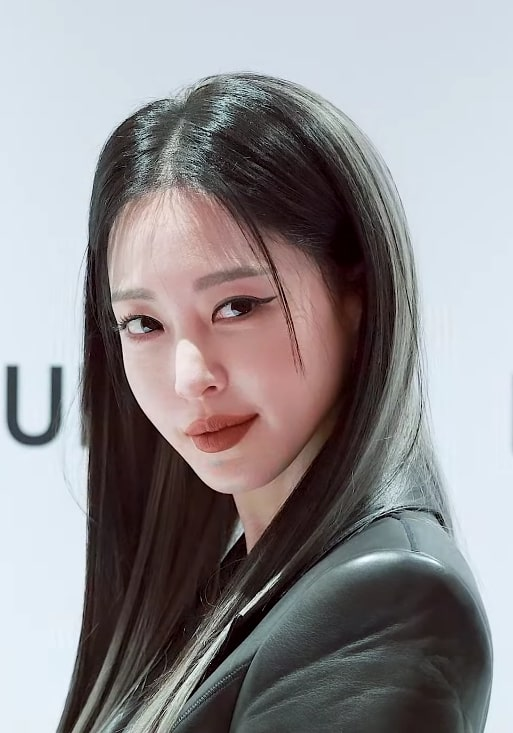
Han in October 2020

In June 2021, Han signed with new agency High Entertainment.

== Personal life ==
On May 2, 2011, Han hit a man surnamed Do on the hip with the wing mirror of her Porsche while driving into the parking lot of her home in an apartment building in Samseong-dong. Do sustained minor injuries and Han's lawyers offered him ₩5 million in compensation, but Do claimed that she had fled the scene. Her then-agency SidusHQ denied this, saying she had apologized and checked if he was okay, but did not step out of her vehicle. After an investigation, police cleared Han of the hit-and-run allegations.

Han began dating YG Entertainment record producer Teddy Park in May 2013. The two were reported to have broken up on October 24, 2016.

In January 2015, the FSS included Han in a list of people who were found to have violated the foreign currency-related law by failing to report their asset acquisition, such as real estate overseas, to relevant authorities. This referred to a commercial building in Koreatown, Los Angeles that Han had bought in 2011, but her then-agency KeyEast issued a statement that the omission had been a technical mistake, because Han had transferred the building's ownership to a company in which she was the major shareholder and was unaware that she should report it.

On May 13, 2021, Han revealed through an update from her Instagram that she is currently dating theatrical actor Ryu Sung-jae, who is 10 years younger than her. On May 7, 2024, Han announced that she had registered her marriage with her boyfriend.

== Filmography ==
=== Film ===
Year	Title	Role	Notes	Ref.
2007	Miss Gold Digger	Shin Mi-soo		
2009	Monsters vs. Aliens	Susan Murphy/Ginormica	Voice role; Korean dubbing	
2011	Penny Pinchers	Gu Hong-sil		

=== Television series ===
Year	Title	Role	Notes	Ref.
2003	Nonstop 4	Han Ye-seul		
2004	Forbidden Love	Chae-yi		
2004	Nonstop 5	Han Ye-seul	Cameo	
2005	That Summer's Typhoon	Han Eun-bi		
2006	Couple or Trouble	Anna Jo / Na Sang-shil		
2008	Tazza	Lee Nan-sook / Mi-na		
2009	Will It Snow for Christmas?	Han Ji-wan		
2011	Spy Myung-wol	Han Myung-wol		
2014	Birth of a Beauty	Sara / Sa Geum-ran		
2016	Madame Antoine: The Love Therapist	Go Hye-rim		
2017	Children of the 20th Century	Sa Jin-jin		
2019	Big Issue	Ji Soo-hyun		
TBA	The Queen Lives in Seoul	Nam Da-la		

=== Television shows ===
Year	Title	Role	Notes	Ref.
2001	Midnight TV Entertainment	Host		
2004–2005	Section TV	Host		
2007	She's Olive: Han Ye-seul in L.A.	Cast		

=== Hosting ===
Year	Title	Notes	Ref.
2004–2005	Inkigayo	With Kim Dong-wan	

=== Music video appearances ===
Year	Title	Artist	Ref.
2003	"With Me"	Wheesung	
2010	"Love Song"	Rain	

== Discography ==
=== Singles ===
Year	Title	Artist	Notes
2004	"You Are Different"	Han Ye-seul	Track 6 on Nonstop 4 OST
2004	"Say It"	Shinhwa feat. Han Ye-seul	Track 11 on Winter Story 2004–2005
2005	"Memory"	Han Ye-seul	Track 2 on That Summer's Typhoon OST
2007	"Make Me Shine"	Han Ye-seul	Track 1 on Miss Gold Digger OST
2009	"Love Class"	Mighty Mouth feat. Han Ye-seul	Track 2 on Love Class EP

== Awards and nominations ==
Name of the award ceremony, year presented, category, nominee of the award, and the result of the nomination
Award ceremony	Year	Category	Nominee / Work	Result	Ref.
Asia Model Awards	2008	Model Star Award	Han Ye-seul	Won	
Asian Festival of First Films	2008	Best Actress	Miss Gold Digger	Nominated	
Baeksang Arts Awards	2007	Best Actress – Television	Couple or Trouble	Nominated	
Baeksang Arts Awards	2007	Most Popular Actress – Television	Couple or Trouble	Won	
Baeksang Arts Awards	2008	Best New Actress – Film	Miss Gold Digger	Won	
Baeksang Arts Awards	2009	Best Actress – Television	Tazza	Nominated	
Blue Dragon Film Awards	2008	Best New Actress	Miss Gold Digger	Won	
Golden Cinematography Awards	2008	Best New Actress	Miss Gold Digger	Won	
Grand Bell Awards	2008	Best New Actress	Miss Gold Digger	Won	
Grand Bell Awards	2008	BMW Popularity Award, Actress	Miss Gold Digger	Won	
Huading Awards	2015	Best Global Actress in a TV series	Birth of a Beauty	Won	
Korea Drama Awards	2016	Excellence Award, Actress	Madame Antoine	Nominated	
Korean Film Awards	2008	Best New Actress	Miss Gold Digger	Nominated	
MBC Drama Awards	2006	Best Couple Award	Han Ye-seul (with Oh Ji-ho); Couple or Trouble	Won	
MBC Drama Awards	2006	Excellence Award, Actress	Couple or Trouble	Won	
MBC Drama Awards	2006	Popularity Award, Actress	Couple or Trouble	Won	
MBC Drama Awards	2017	Top Excellence Award, Actress in a Monday-Tuesday Drama	20th Century Boy and Girl	Nominated	
MBC Entertainment Awards	2004	Top Excellence Award, Actress in a Sitcom/Comedy	Nonstop 4	Won	
Mnet Asian Music Awards	2004	Best OST	"You Are Different"	Nominated	
SBS Drama Awards	2008	Excellence Award, Actress in a Special Planning Drama	Tazza	Won	
SBS Drama Awards	2008	Top 10 Stars	Tazza	Won	
SBS Drama Awards	2014	Best Couple Award	Han Ye-seul (with Joo Sang-wook); Birth of a Beauty	Won	
SBS Drama Awards	2014	Excellence Award, Actress in a Drama Special	Birth of a Beauty	Won	
SBS Drama Awards	2014	Top 10 Stars	Birth of a Beauty	Won	
SBS Supermodel Contest	2001	Juliet Award	Han Ye-seul	Won	
