= The Third Hospital =

- Promotional poster
- Also known as: The 3rd Hospital; Third Ward
- Genre: Medical drama Romance
- Created by: Park Ji-young; Studio Dragon -tvN
- Written by: Seong Jean-mea
- Directed by: Kim Young-jun; Kim Sol-mae
- Starring: Kim Seung-woo; Oh Ji-ho; Kim Min-jung; Choi Soo-young
- Composer: Kim Woo-cheol
- Country of origin: South Korea
- Original language: Korean
- No. of episodes: 20

Production
- Executive producer: Chanho Lee
- Producer: Kim Ryun-hee
- Cinematography: Sebastian Kim
- Production company: Taewon Entertainment

Original release
- Network: tvN
- Release: September 5 – November 8, 2012

The Third Hospital (Korean: 제3병원; RR: Je3byeongwon; lit. '3rd Hospital') is a 2012 South Korean medical drama, starring Kim Seung-woo, Oh Ji-ho, Kim Min-jung and Choi Soo-young. It centers on the conflicts between Western and Eastern medicine and the rivalry between two brothers who espouse them. It aired on cable channel tvN from September 5 to November 8, 2012 on Wednesdays and Thursdays at 21:55 for 20 episodes.

== Plot ==
The show is set in a hospital that houses both Western and Eastern medicine traditions. Seung-hyun and Doo-hyun are brothers and geniuses—Doo-hyun is a neurosurgeon, while Seung-hyun is the Oriental medicine specialist. The two, along with each their own friends and teams, will compete ferociously with each other because of their different views on medicine, but also come together to help save patients' lives.

== Cast ==
- Kim Seung-woo as Kim Doo-hyun
  - Ahn Do-gyu as child Doo-hyun
- Oh Ji-ho as Kim Seung-hyun
- Kim Min-jung as Jin Hye-in
- Choi Soo-young as Lee Eui-jin
- Choi Yoon-so as Jung Seung-hee
- Park Geun-hyung as Kim Ha-yoon (Doo-hyun's and Seung-hyun's father)
- Im Ha-ryong as Chae In-gook
- Im Hyung-joon as Min Joo-ahn
- Yoo Tae-woong as Chief Park
- Kim Jong-goo as Yang Hyan-goo
- Lee Tae-kyum as Ahn Hyung-joon
- Nam Moon-chul as Jo Sung-wook
- Lee Jung-hun as Lee Dong-sung
- Do Ye-sung as Hyun Sang-wook
- Nam Ji-hyun (Note: Credited as Son Ji-hyun.) as female singer (cameo)
- Choi Soo-jin as Jeong Eui-jin (cameo)
- So Hee-jung
- Park Dae-kyu

== See also ==
- Brain
- Behind the White Tower
