= A Better Tomorrow (2010 film) =

2010 film by Song Hae-sung

- Promotion poster for A Better Tomorrow
- Hangul: 무적자
- Hanja: 無敵者
- Lit.: Invincible
- RR: Mujeokja
- MR: Mujŏkcha
- Directed by: Song Hae-sung
- Screenplay by: Kim Hyo-seok; Lee Taek-gyeong; Choi Geun-mo; Kim Hae-gon; John Woo
- Story by: Jo Chang-ho
- Produced by: Park Hyung-jun
- Starring: Joo Jin-mo; Song Seung-heon; Kim Kang-woo; Jo Han-sun
- Cinematography: Kang Seung-ki
- Edited by: Park Gok-ji
- Music by: Lee Jae-jin
- Production company: Fingerprint Pictures
- Distributed by: CJ Entertainment
- Release date: 16 September 2010
- Running time: 124 minutes
- Country: South Korea
- Language: Korean
- Budget: USD8,700,000
- Box office: US$10,751,422

A Better Tomorrow (Korean: 무적자; RR: Mujeokja; lit. 'Invincible') is a 2010 South Korean neo-noir action drama film starring Joo Jin-mo, Song Seung-heon, Kim Kang-woo and Jo Han-sun. It is an official remake of the 1986 Hong Kong film A Better Tomorrow. It was directed by Song Hae-sung and produced by Fingerprint Pictures. John Woo, who directed the original 1986 version, acted as executive producer and co-writer.

The film premiered as part of Special Events at the 67th Venice International Film Festival on September 2, 2010, where it was introduced by John Woo, as having "its own character and own soul, and many new elements." It was released in theaters on September 16, 2010.

== Plot ==
Kim Hyuk (Joo Jin-mo) is a detective in the South Korean National Police Agency, having escaped from North Korea as a teenager. Unbeknownst to his superiors, he also moonlights as an illegal arms smuggler with his best friend and partner in crime, Lee Young-choon (Song Seung-heon), who also defected from the North. Hyuk has a younger brother, Chul (Kim Kang-woo), whom he was forced to leave behind (along with their mother) during his escape. Guilt-ridden over leaving his brother behind, Hyuk has spent the past few years searching for his brother. Eventually, he finds Chul in an internment camp for Northern defectors, but Chul resents Hyuk for leaving them behind. It is then revealed that their mother was killed by North Korean authorities as retribution for Hyuk's escape.

Hyuk goes to Thailand to complete an arms deal, accompanied by an ambitious gangster named Jung Tae-min (Jo Han-sun). However, the deal turns out to be a set-up by Jung, who leaves Hyuk to be killed by the Thai gangsters. He survives but gets arrested and sentenced to three years in prison. After reading about Hyuk's capture in the newspaper, Lee finds the Thai gangster in a massage parlor and kills him and his henchmen. However, in the ensuing gunfight, he is shot in the knee and crippled. Hyuk is released from prison. Remorseful and determined to start a new life, he finds work as a taxi driver. Meanwhile, Chul has become an officer in the National Police and Jung has become the leader of the arms smuggling operation, while Lee, cut out of the arms operation by Jung, does odd jobs to survive.

During an emotional reunion, Lee asks Hyuk to return to the underworld and take revenge on Jung, but Hyuk refuses. He seeks Chul out, hoping for a reconciliation, but Chul rebuffs him, seeing Hyuk as nothing but a criminal and still resentful that Hyuk left the family in North Korea. Jung finds Hyuk and presses him to rejoin the organization, even offering to give Lee his old job back, but Hyuk refuses. Meanwhile, Chul becomes obsessed with arresting Jung. After Jung has Lee beaten and threatens to harm Chul, Hyuk decides to join his old friend in taking revenge on Jung. Hyuk and Lee steal incriminating evidence from the smuggling business, and Hyuk secretly sends it to the police while tricking Lee into paying him a large ransom. Using Jung as a hostage, Hyuk and Young-choon take the money to a pier, intending to escape by boat. Meanwhile, having followed his brother, Chul arrives on the scene but is captured by Jung's men. Even though he is free to escape, Hyuk decides to return to save Chul and asks Lee to leave with the money.

Hyuk returns and offers to exchange Jung for Chul, but the trade explodes into a wild shootout. Hyuk and Chul are wounded and pinned down, but Lee suddenly appears and saves them. After killing many of Jung's men, Lee berates Chul, telling him that he should be grateful to have a brother like Hyuk. He is then shot in the back and killed by Jung's men. The police arrive, but Jung flees into a nearby steelyard. Hyuk and Chul chase after him, but Hyuk is shot and killed when he shields Chul from Jung's gunfire. Jung mocks Chul and prepares to surrender to the surrounding police. Despite warnings from the police to drop his weapon, Chul shoots and kills Jung. As the police advance, Chul cradles his brother's body in his arms and tearfully laments that he missed him. He aims his gun to his head and the scene cuts to black as a single gunshot is heard.

== Cast ==
- Joo Jin-mo – Kim Hyuk
- Song Seung-heon – Lee Young-choon
- Kim Kang-woo – Kim Chul
- Jo Han-sun – Jung Tae-min
- Lee Geung-young – Park Kyung-wi
- Kim Ji-young – aunt
- Kim Hae-gon – Boss Jung
- Im Hyung-joon – Detective Lee
- Lee Ki-hyuk as Combat police
- Seo Tae-hwa – Public Prosecutor Jo
- Jeong Gi-seop – Detective Park
- Moon Kyung-min
- Lee Sin-seong

== Differences between remake and original ==
- The protagonists are arms traffickers as opposed to counterfeiters.
- Kim Hyuk is a police officer who moonlights as an illegal arms trafficker, whereas his counterpart in the original, Sung Chi-ho was not involved in law enforcement.
- Chul is hostile and resentful towards Hyuk for his perceived abandonment as a teenager whereas Ho and Kit have a close fraternal relationship until Ho's arrest.
- Young-choon is shown to be suspicious of Jung's motives, and Hyuk witnesses Jung's betrayal during the deal. In the original, Shing's duplicity is not revealed until much later in the film.
- Unlike Kit, Chul does not have a girlfriend, hence no female roles.
- It is implied that Young-choon works for himself (doing odd jobs) after being crippled whereas Mark is shown to work for Shing in the original.
- Young-choon is shot and killed by a multitude of Jung's men whereas Mark was killed by Shing (and his right-hand man) directly.
- Hyuk and Chul die in the remake whereas Ho and Kit both survive the final showdown and successfully reconcile in the original.

== Reception ==
In South Korea, the film ranked second and grossed over ₩2.8 billion in its first week of release. By 21 September, it had grossed US$2.5 million, beating Cyrano Agency at the box office. After six weeks of screening, the film grossed a total of ₩11 billion. The film sold a total of 1,546,420 tickets nationwide. In Japan it ranked #11 and grossed over ¥19 million in its one week of release on 103 screens.

Film Business Asia gave the film a five out of ten rating, opining that "there's plenty of South Korean machismo (with none of the lightness and humour of its Hong Kong equivalent) and a much darker emotional core, with some intense male bonding ... making this an oppressively all-male affair, heightened by the saturated photography and in-your-face action."
