= Hong Seok-cheon =

South Korean actor, television personality, restaurateur

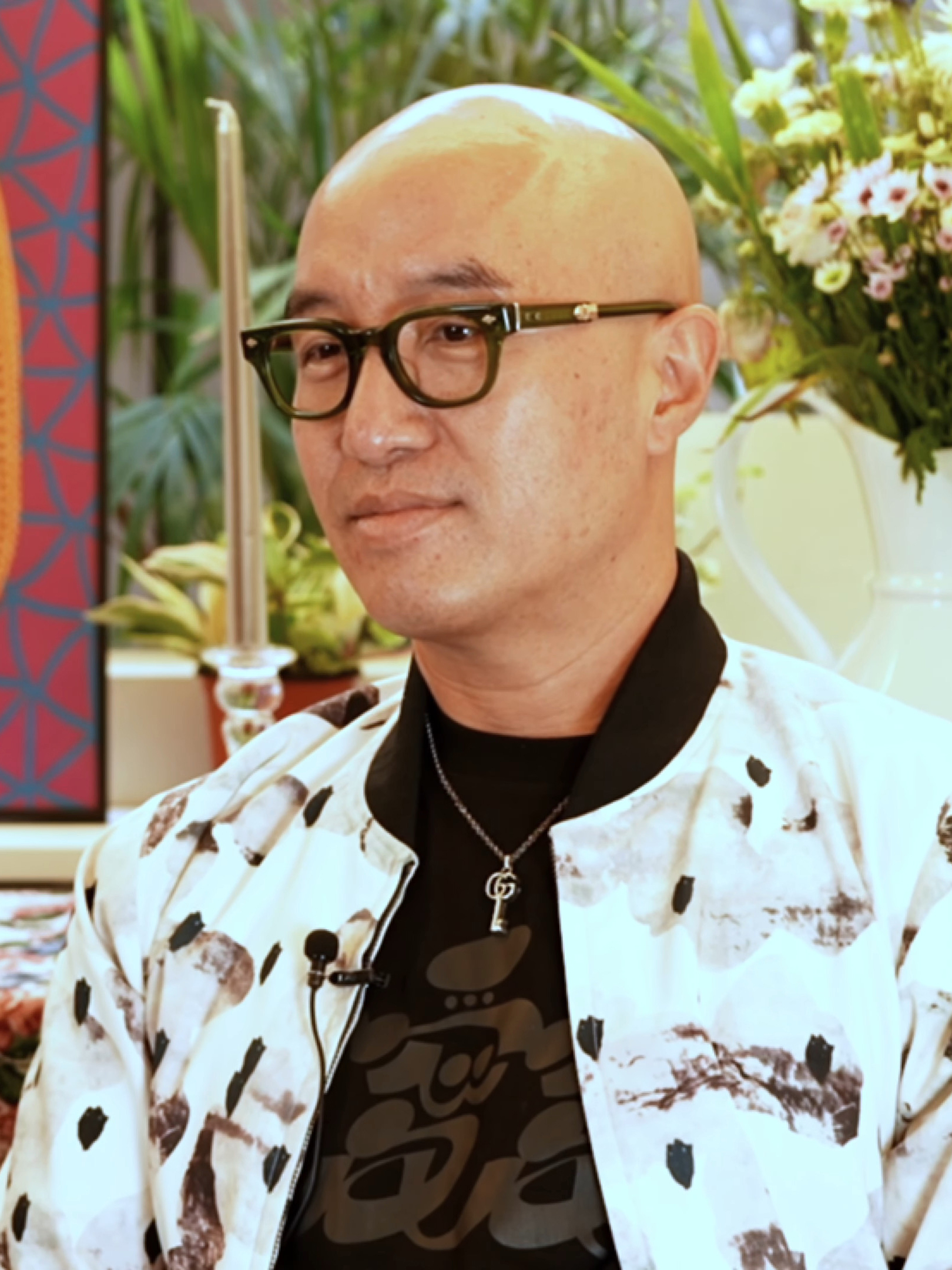
- Hong in 2025
- Born: 3 February 1971 (age 55); Cheongyang County, South Chungcheong Province, South Korea
- Education: Hanyang University – Theater and Film (1989)
- Occupations: Actor; television personality; restaurateur
- Years active: 1994–present
- Agent: Foresta Company
- Children: 2 (adopted)

Korean name
- Hangul: 홍석천
- Hanja: 洪錫天
- RR: Hong Seokcheon
- MR: Hong Sŏkch'ŏn

Hong Seok-cheon (born February 3, 1971) is a South Korean actor, television personality, restaurateur and member of the dissolved Democratic Labor Party. He caused considerable controversy in his home country when he came out as gay in 2000, and remains the most prominent openly gay celebrity in Korea.

== Career ==
Hong Seok-cheon was born in Cheongyang County in South Chungcheong Province. He began his entertainment career as a male model, and made his screen debut in 1994 as a reporter for Live TV Information Center. In 1995, he won the bronze prize at the KBS Comedian Festival for university students. Due to his versatility and comic timing, Hong had a prolific career on South Korean television, appearing in children's programs and variety shows, as well as sitcoms and dramas.

On a variety show in 2000, Hong was asked a question regarding his sexuality and he chose to answer honestly that he was gay. Though the show's producers initially edited out the exchange, a journalist learned about the story and pressed Hong to confirm his admission. After Hong revealed his sexuality, he was fired from his network television programs and advertisements amidst public uproar, and no longer landed any major acting roles. He faced massive stigma after becoming the country's first openly gay celebrity, and later said he experienced such shunning, verbal abuse and discrimination that he rarely stepped out of his social circle. He then wrote his memoir My Heart Still Throbs for Forgotten Love, in which he recounted a failed romance with a Dutch man named Tony.

Forced out of the entertainment business, Hong wanted to leave the country to study in New York, but said he decided to stay in Korea to prove to his detractors that he could be a success. He started his first restaurant, Our Place, in 2002, two years after he came out. As of 2013, he owns and runs nine high-end restaurants in Itaewon, home to a large expat community in Seoul. Hong's restaurants are all characterized by the prefix "My": My Hong, My Chi chi*s, My Thai, My Thai China, My X, My Chelsea, My Noodle, and My Suji.

In 2004, Hong joined the Democratic Labor Party and was selected by Time magazine as the year's Asian Hero. Hong also continued appearing regularly on talk shows, notably Yeo Yoo Man Man, on which he appreared with his parents and discussed his life since coming out. As an actor, Hong starred in the thriller Puzzle (2006) and a 2009 performance of the stage play A Midsummer Night's Dream. He also founded the internet shopping mall Ne2Nom in 2007. He became a professor at Korea National University of Arts, teaching Broadcast Content Production in 2010 and Fashion Arts in 2011.

After his sister's divorce, Hong adopted her two children and changed their last names to his. In 2008, he hosted his own talk show, Coming Out, which featured gay issues. Despite conservatism in South Korean society, Hong overcame initial public disapproval and gradually gained more mainstream acceptance, especially among the younger generation, in part because of his activism in fighting for LGBT rights.

In 2015, Hong announced that he planned to run for district head of the Yongsan District Office in the 2018 local elections. Having lived in Yongsan District for ten years, he said he aimed to promote cultural spaces for young artists and small businesses, while providing welfare for sexual minorities. In 2016, he participated in the program Law of the Jungle.

In 2018, he stated that he is third cousins with Taeyong of NCT.

== Filmography ==
=== Film ===
Year	Title	Role	Notes	Ref.
1997	Do the Right Thing	Henchman		
1997	No. 3	Adulterous man		
1997	Man with Flowers	Lee Joo-il		
1998	Rub Love	Stop Bar bartender		
1998	Tie a Yellow Ribbon	Dong-gyu		
1999	Ghost in Love	Subway passenger		
2001	Last Present	Cheong-chun		
2001	A Tearful Story		Cameo	
2001	Hera Purple	Min-seok		
2003	Dying or Live	Charlie Choi		
2005	The Art of Seduction	DJ		
2006	Good Luck	Skinhead Hong		
2006	Puzzle	Noh		
2008	The Accidental Gangster and the Mistaken Courtesan	Tailor shop owner	Cameo	
2009	Sky and Sea	Hair designer	Cameo	
2011	Dream the Good Dream	Russian mafia Kalashnikov	Short film	
2012	Runway Cop	Show director		
2014	Fashion King	MC Seok-cheon	Cameo	
2015	Love Forecast	My Thai China restaurant owner	Cameo	
2015	Mongolian Princess	Movie actor	Cameo	
2015	Love Clinic	Psychiatrist	Cameo	

=== Television series ===
Year	Title	Role	Notes	Ref.
1995	LA Arirang			
1996	Three Guys and Three Girls	Hong Seok-cheon		
2000	Paradise			
2001	Why Can't We Stop Them			
2003	Perfect Love	Hong Seung-jo		
2005	Sad Love Story	Charlie		
2005	18 vs. 29			
2005	Fashion 70s			
2006	Hyena			
2007	Kid Gang			
2007	Golden Bride			
2008	Life Special Investigation Team			
2008	Aeja's Older Sister, Minja	Heo Goo-hyung		
2008	The Secret of Coocoo Island	Professor of Korean language and literature		
2009	Can't Stop Now			
2009	The Accidental Couple	Movie director	Cameo	
2009	Swallow the Sun	Jimmy		
2009	Assorted Gems	Director Hong		
2009	Joseon Mystery Detective Jeong Yak-yong	Cheol-du		
2011	Baby Faced Beauty			
2011	Bravo, My Love!	Julien	Cameo	
2011	Ojakgyo Family			
2011	Saving Mrs. Go Bong-shil	Seok-cheon		
2012	Dummy Mommy	Hairdresser	Cameo	
2012	Vampire Prosecutor 2	Gabriel Jang	Cameo; episode 6	
2013	Blue Tower	Platoon first lieutenant Hong		
2013	A Tale of Two Sisters		Cameo	
2013	Reply 1994	ROTC cadet	Cameo; episode 2	
2014	Triangle	Man-kang		
2014	Everybody Say Kimchi	Wedding dress shop owner	Cameo	
2014	My Secret Hotel	Chef Andre Hong		
2015	The Man in the Mask	Pi Sung-ho		
2015	Sense8	Referee		
2015	The Time We Were Not in Love	Airplane passenger	Cameo; episode 1	
2015	Yumi's Room			
2016	My Horrible Boss	Photographer	Cameo	
2017	Saimdang, Memoir of Colors			
2017	Suspicious Partner	Monk		
2018	Player		Cameo	
2018	Lovely Horribly	Kang Hyun-seok		
2019	My Absolute Boyfriend			
2020	Touch	Kim Dong-min		
2020	Itaewon Class	Himself	Cameo; episodes 2, 4, 9 & 16	
2020	Missing: The Other Side	Mr. Hong	Cameo; episode 9	
2021	Dali & Cocky Prince	Chef Hong Seok-cheon	Cameo; episode 1	
2021	Young Lady and Gentleman	Real estate president	Cameo; episode 2	
2022	The Driver		Cameo	
2022	Jinxed at First	Hong President		
2023	Perfect Marriage Revenge	Clothing store owner	Cameo; episode 5	

=== Web series ===
Year	Title	Role	Ref.
2022	Free		
2022	Fantasy Spot	Shim	

=== Television shows ===
Year	Title	Role	Notes	Ref.
1994	Live TV Information Center	Reporter		
1999	Laughter Festival			
1999	Music Champ			
1999	Sisa Touch! Comedy File			
1999	Field Experience of Life			
2000	Ppo Ppo Ppo (Kiss Kiss Kiss)			
2000	TV Star Festival			
2001	Challenge, Ajumma Goes	Host		
2008	Coming Out	Host		
2009	We Got Married			
2009	Immutable Law of Loving Bad Boys – Season 7			
2011–2012	Rebirth Variety: Havana			
2012	Queen of Beauty – Season 2			
2012	Talk Show Shocking			
2012	XY Her			
2013	Golden Fishery			
2013	Chef's Midnight Snacks	Host		
2013	Splash			
2013	Millionaire Game: My Turn			
2013	I Live Alone	Guest		
2013	Witch Hunt	Cast member		
2014	Shopper Man	Host		
2014	Cook King Korea	Host		
2014	Roommate – Season 2	Guest		
2014	Running Man	Guest		
2014	Flying Fox in New York			
2015	Saturday Night Live Korea – Season 6	Cast member		
2015	King of Mask Singer	Contestant (Hardware Store Boss Kim)	Episode 7	
2015	Please Take Care of My Refrigerator	Cast member		
2015	A Meal's Dignity			
2015	Hello Counselor	Guest		
2016	Vocal War: God's Voice	Panelist	Pilot episode, episodes 1–2, 9–10	
2016	Battle Trip	Contestant	with Bong Man-dae; episodes 5-6	
2016	Law of the Jungle: New Caledonia	Cast member		
2016	Golden Tambourine	Guest		
2017	Battle Trip	Contestant	with Yoon Park; episodes 54-55	
2018	4 Wheeled Restaurant	Cast member		
2020	Radio Star	Guest MC		
2022	Restaurant Forgotten 2	Cast Member		
2022	Angel Island	Regular Member	with Park Jin-hee	

=== Web shows ===
Year	Title	Role	Notes	Ref.
2021	Berry Store	Mentor		
2022	Mary Queer	Host		
2022	If you like it, it will ring!	Host		
2024– 2025	Hong Seok-Cheon's Jewel Box	Host		

== Stage ==
=== Theatre ===
Year	Title	Role	Notes	Ref.
1994	Save the Last Dance for Me			
1995; 2009	A Midsummer Night's Dream	Francis Flute		
1999	A Chorus Line			
2002	Godspell			
2006	Footloose	Willard Hewitt		
2010	The Rocky Horror Show	Narrator		
2013–2014	Nunsense A-Men	Sister Mary Leo		

== Bibliography ==
Year	Title	Publisher	ISBN
2000	My Heart Still Throbs for Forgotten Love	J-pub	ISBN 9788983755315
2008	Design Your Own Restaurant	M-Books	ISBN 9788996048459

== Awards and nominations ==
Name of the award ceremony, year presented, category, nominee of the award, and the result of the nomination
Award ceremony	Year	Category	Nominee / Work	Result	Ref.
Blue Dragon Series Awards	2023	Best Male Entertainer	Merry Queer	Nominated	
