= Oh Ji-ho =

South Korean actor (born 1976)

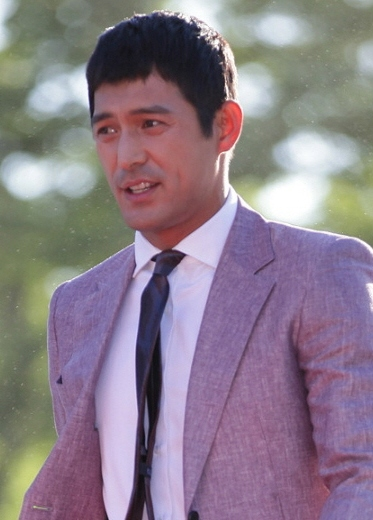
- Oh in July 2015
- Born: April 14, 1976 (age 50); Mokpo, South Jeolla Province, South Korea
- Occupation: Actor
- Years active: 1998–present
- Agent: EL Park
- Spouse: Eun Bo-ah (m. 2014)
- Children: 2

Korean name
- Hangul: 오지호
- Hanja: 吳智昊
- RR: O Jiho
- MR: O Chiho

Oh Ji-ho (Korean: 오지호; born April 14, 1976) is a South Korean actor. He is best known for the television dramas Couple or Trouble (2006), The Slave Hunters (2010), The Queen of Office (2013) and My Fair Lady (2016).

== Career ==
Oh was born and raised in Mokpo, South Jeolla Province. He dropped out of his e-Business Management course at Anyang Industrial Technical School and at the age of 22, moved to Seoul on his own to pursue a career in acting. He first found work as a commercial model, then made his acting debut in 1998 with a minor role in the film Kka (Naked Being).

Despite starring in a few movies (notably the erotic two-hander La Belle in 2000), Oh would become better known for his work in television. He soon earned heartthrob status among fans for his handsome face and well-defined muscles, but critics initially dismissed him as just another model-turned-actor with attractive looks but little talent. In 2004, Oh established his acting credentials in A Second Proposal, about a divorcee getting another chance at love; he won Best Supporting Actor at the KBS Drama Awards. He next starred in Couple or Trouble (2006), a Hong sisters-penned romantic comedy series inspired by Overboard about a handyman who gets his petty revenge on an amnesiac heiress by lying to her that she's his live-in girlfriend so that she'll help take care of his three nephews. Couple or Trouble received high ratings and praise for its stars' acting, and Oh took home two popularity prizes at the MBC Drama Awards.

This was followed by more leading roles in Autumn Shower (2005) as a man who falls for the best friend of his comatose wife, Get Karl! Oh Soo-jung (2007) as a pro-golfer who wants to get back at the ex-girlfriend who dumped him when he was overweight and unsuccessful, and Single Dad in Love (2008) as a mixed martial arts fighter whose young son has been diagnosed with a brain tumor; but these series drew lackluster ratings.

In 2009, he played a smart yet socially inept underperformer whose wife will do anything to help him climb the corporate ladder in Queen of Housewives; despite being outshined by his other costars, Oh proved his willingness to look foolish in the service of comedy (similar to his turn in the 2005 series Super Rookie). Oh then reunited with Single Dad in Love television director Kwak Jung-hwan in his most high-profile, critically acclaimed series yet: historical drama The Slave Hunters (2010). Using his physicality to great effect, Oh portrayed a Joseon military general who becomes a runaway slave and his performance garnered him an Excellence Award at the 2010 KBS Drama Awards.

In 2011, Oh was cast in a supporting role in Sector 7, a 3D action film about a creature lurking on an oil rig, then appeared in the Korea-China-Japan co-production Strangers 6 and medical drama The Third Hospital (both in 2012). He also played ousted guard Baek Dong-soo in The Grand Heist, a Joseon-set comedy heist film about the theft of ice blocks from the royal storage.

Oh next starred in The Queen of Office (2013), a workplace dramedy adapted from Japanese television drama Haken no Hinkaku that addresses the plight of temps, followed by paranormal police procedural Cheo Yong (2014) as the titular ghost-seeing detective, and period drama More Than a Maid (2015) where he played a mysterious slave on an undercover assignment. He then played an obstetrician/gynecologist with impotence problems in the adult romantic comedy film Love Clinic (2015).

== Personal life ==
On January 9, 2007, Oh's ex-girlfriend, a bar hostess identified only by her surname Lim and bar name "Anna," killed herself shortly after they broke up. Oh said although he loved her, Lim was the one who ended their two year relationship because she didn't want to get in the way of his career. Lim's bereaved family and friends, however, insisted that Oh broke up with her on January 3, and the hurt drove her to suicide. A TV program later interviewed Lim's relatives and with their permission, entered her bedroom, and some of Oh's personal items were shown on camera, such as his screenplay and photos. After the show was aired, the TV station was severely criticized by the public for compromising the privacy of the people involved.

Oh married Eun Bo-ah on April 12, 2014, at the Shilla Hotel. Eun works in the fashion industry. They welcomed their first child, a daughter named Oh Seo-heun (nicknamed "Jibong"), on December 30, 2015. Both he and his daughter have been cast members of reality program The Return of Superman since 2016. They welcomed their second child, a son, on August 18, 2018.

== Filmography ==
=== Film ===
Year	Title	Role	Notes
1998	Kka (Naked Being)	Trainee 2	
2000	La Belle	Man	
2001	I Love You	Ji-hoo	
2003	Silver Knife	Joo-hak	
2004	Love Trilogy	Song Zi Ming	Hong Kong-Chinese film
2006	My Wife Is a Gangster 3	Kkongchi	
2011	Sector 7	Kim Dong-soo	
2012	The Grand Heist	Baek Dong-soo	
2013	Help		short film
2014	Man on High Heels	Lee Seok (cameo)	
2015	Island	K	
2015	Love Clinic	Wang Seong-ki	
2016	Duel: Final Round	Han Jae-hee	
2017	Coffee Mate	Hee-soo	
2019	A History of Jealousy	Won-ho	
2019	Rainbow Playground	Tae-seong	
2020	The Nightmare	Yun-woo	
2020	The Prisoner	Shin Se-do	
2020	The Therapist: Fist of Tae-baek	Sung-joon	
2020	The Fisherman Bar	Lee Jong-bum	
2020	Dragon Inn Part 1: The City of Sadness		
2021	Dragon Inn Part 2: The Night of the Gods	Father Kim	
2022	The Legendary Tazza's Tap	Taek-dong	
2023	In Dream	Jae-in	

=== Television series ===
Year	Title	Role
2001	Cool	
2002	Confession	Kim Myung-woo
2002	MBC Best Theater "Beguiling Romance"	
2002	MBC Best Theater "Fly Daughters"	
2002	Open Drama Man and Woman "To Mr. Martial Arts"	
2003	Detective	
2004	Drama City "Waving a Handkerchief"	Chan-ki
2004	A Second Proposal	Nam Kyung-soo
2005	MBC Best Theater "My Beautiful Barbershop"	
2005	Super Rookie	Lee Bong-sam
2005	Autumn Shower	Choi Yoon-jae
2006	Thanks Life	Yoon Jin-soo
2006	Couple or Trouble	Jang Chul-soo
2007	Get Karl! Oh Soo-jung	Go Man-soo/Karl Go
2008	Single Dad in Love	Kang Poong-ho
2008	My Precious You	Himself (ep 7, 9, 10)
2009	Queen of Housewives	Ohn Dal-soo
2010	The Slave Hunters	Song Tae-ha
2010	The Fugitive: Plan B	Kevin Jung (cameo)
2012	Strangers 6	Park Tae-hyun
2012	The Third Hospital	Kim Seung-hyun
2013	The Queen of Office	Jang Gyu-jik
2013	Basketball	Gambling basketball star (cameo)
2014	Cheo Yong	Yoon Cheo-yong
2015	More Than a Maid	Mumyeong ("Nameless")/Lee Bi
2015	Late Night Restaurant	Sung-kyun (guest, episode 7)
2015	Cheo Yong 2	Yoon Cheo-yong
2016	My Little Baby	Cha Jung-han
2016	What's Your Blood Type?	Type A
2016	My Fair Lady	Mo Hwi-chul
2018	Should We Kiss First?	Eun Kyung-soo
2019	Liver or Die	Lee Jin-sang
2019	Hotel del Luna	Chan-seong's father (Cameo, ep. 1 & 16)
2019	Never Twice	Gam Poong-gi
2023	Queen of Masks	Choi Kang-hoo
2025	Heo's Diner	Assassin / Detective Kang

=== Variety shows ===
Year	Title	Notes/Ref.
2002	Beautiful Sunday: "Unification Sea Route Group"	
2009-2010	Invincible Baseball Team	Cast member
2011-2012	Storytelling Magic Show	
2012	Saturday Night Live Korea	Host, episode 9
2012	I'm Real: Oh Ji-ho in Canada	
2016	The Return of Superman	Cast, with daughter Oh Seo-heun
2018	Real Man 300	Cast member
2021	Star Golf Big League	Cast Member
2021	Cooking: The Birth of a Cooking King	Contestant
2022	Perfect Life	Host

=== Music video appearances ===
Year	Song title	Artist
1999	"Sad Love"	Park Eun-shin
1999	"Go Away"	Park Ji-yoon
2000	"Lieblich"	Boohwal
2000	"8318"	J
2000	"Love You for All Time"	Jessica feat. Kim Min-jong
2001	"Walk"	Park Ki-young
2002	"Memories"	Jo Kwan-woo
2005	"Time Limited Life"	V.O.S
	"I Now"	Choi Hyun-joon feat. Lee Jin-sung (Monday Kiz)
	"Confession"	Lee Seung-chul
2010	"Words That I Can Say"	T-Max
2011	"Ordinary"	Baek Ji-young

== Discography ==
Year	Song title	Notes
2008	"It Will Be Fine (Act ver.)"	track from Single Dad in Love OST
2011	"The First Poem"	single
2012	"I Am a Man"	track from Strangers 6 OST

== Awards and nominations ==
Year presented, name of the award ceremony, category, nominated work and the result of the nomination
Year	Award	Category	Nominated work	Result
2000	21st Blue Dragon Film Awards	Best New Actor	La Belle	Nominated
2004	KBS Drama Awards	Best Supporting Actor	A Second Proposal	Won
2005	MBC Drama Awards	Excellence Award, Actor	Super Rookie	Nominated
2006	MBC Drama Awards	Excellence Award, Actor	Couple or Trouble	Nominated
2006	MBC Drama Awards	Popularity Award	Couple or Trouble	Won
2006	MBC Drama Awards	Best Couple Award with Han Ye-seul	Couple or Trouble	Won
2007	SBS Drama Awards	Excellence Award, Actor in a Miniseries	Get Karl! Oh Soo-jung	Nominated
2007	SBS Drama Awards	Top 10 Stars	Get Karl! Oh Soo-jung	Won
2009	4th Asia Model Awards	Model Star Award	—N/a	Won
2010	KBS Drama Awards	Excellence Award, Actor in a Mid-length Drama	The Slave Hunters	Won
2013	7th Mnet 20's Choice Awards	20's Drama Star - Male	The Queen of Office	Nominated
2013	21st Korean Culture and Entertainment Awards	Excellence Award, Actor (TV)	The Queen of Office	Won
2013	KBS Drama Awards	Top Excellence Award, Actor	The Queen of Office	Nominated
2013	KBS Drama Awards	Excellence Award, Actor in a Miniseries	The Queen of Office	Won
2013	KBS Drama Awards	Best Couple Award with Kim Hye-soo	The Queen of Office	Won
2016	KBS Drama Awards	Excellence Award, Actor in a Miniseries	My Fair Lady	Nominated
2016	KBS Drama Awards	Best Couple Award with Heo Jung-eun	My Fair Lady	Won
2018	SBS Drama Awards	Excellence Award, Actor in a Monday-Tuesday Drama	Should We Kiss First	Nominated
2019	MBC Drama Awards	Top Excellence Award, Actor in a Weekend/Daily Drama	Never Twice	Nominated
2020	14th SBS Entertainment Awards	Best Teamwork Award	Same Bed, Different Dreams 2: You Are My Destiny	Won
2021	7th APAN Star Awards	Top Excellence Award, Actor in a Serial Drama	Never Twice	Nominated
