= Spy Myung-wol =

2011 South Korean television series

- Promotional poster
- Also known as: Myung-wol the Spy
- Hangul: 스파이 명월
- Hanja: 스파이 明月
- RR: Seupai Myeongwol
- MR: Sŭp'ai Myŏngwŏl
- Genre: Romance; Drama; Action
- Created by: Kwak Ki-won (KBS)
- Written by: Kim Eun-young
- Directed by: Hwang In-hyuk; Kim Young-kyun
- Starring: Han Ye-seul; Eric Mun; Lee Jin-wook
- Composer: Cho Yoon-jung
- Country of origin: South Korea
- Original language: Korean
- No. of episodes: 18

Production
- Executive producers: Jeong Seonghyo (KBS); Choi Moon Suk; Cho Yoon-jung
- Producers: Im Kyu-yong; Kim Jin-woo
- Production locations: South Korea, Singapore
- Production company: Victory Contents

Original release
- Network: KBS2
- Release: 11 July – 6 September 2011

Spy Myung-wol (Korean: 스파이 명월) is a 2011 South Korean television series starring Han Ye-seul, Eric Mun, and Lee Jin-wook. It aired on KBS2 from July 11 to September 6, 2011 on Mondays and Tuesdays at 21:55 for 18 episodes.

== Plot ==
Han Myung-wol is a North Korean spy who infiltrates the South under orders to kidnap popular hallyu actor Kang Woo, only to end up falling in love with him.

== Cast ==
- Han Ye-seul as Han Myung-wol
- Eric Mun as Kang Woo
  - Son Woo-hyeon as teenage Kang Woo
- Lee Jin-wook as Choi Ryu
- Jang Hee-jin as Joo In-ah
- Lee Deok-hwa as Chairman Joo
- Jo Hyung-ki as Han Hee-bok
- Yu Ji-in as Rhee Ok-soon
- Lee Kyun as Lee Dae-kang
- Park Hyun-sook as Kyung Jae-in
- Shin Seung-hwan as Bang Geuk-bong
- Son Eun-seo as Yoo Da-hae
- Lee Byung-joon as Yoo Jung-shik
- Lee Ji-hoon as Kwak Ji-tae
- Cha Seung-joon as Jang Han-soo
- Kim Ha-kyun as Kim Young-tak
- Jung Da-hye as Kim Eun-joo
- Kim Ga-young as Joo Kyung-joo
- Kim Sung-oh as actor in action movie (cameo, ep 1)
- Shin Bo-ra as participants in audition (cameo, ep 9 )
- X-5 as trainees (cameo, ep 9-10)

== Ratings ==
Date	Episode	Nationwide	Seoul
2011-07-11	01	9.6% (18th)	10.6% (13th)
2011-07-12	02	7.6%	7.8% (19th)
2011-07-18	03	5.9%	7.7%
2011-07-19	04	6.4%	6.5%
2011-07-25	05	8.3% (16th)	10.0% (11th)
2011-07-26	06	7.6%	8.7% (17th)
2011-08-01	07	7.3% (20th)	8.4% (14th)
2011-08-02	08	7.3%	7.3% (20th)
2011-08-08	09	6.8%	8.8%
2011-08-09	10	8.1% (20th)	10.1% (11th)
2011-08-15	Special	5.6%	9.1%
2011-08-16	11	5.9%	9.2%
2011-08-22	12	5.8%	7.7% (19th)
2011-08-23	13	6.6%	7.8% (19th)
2011-08-29	14	5.3%	8.8%
2011-08-30	15	6.3%	8.1%
2011-09-05	16	5.6%	7.6%
2011-09-06	17	9.1%	7.6%
2011-09-06	18	6.0%	7.6%
Average		7.1%	-

Source: TNmS Media Korea

== Soundtrack ==
1. 사랑이 무서워 (Afraid of Love) (Title) – Bobby Kim
2. 세상 그 누구보다 (More Than Anyone in the World) – Lena Park
3. 더 사랑한다면 (If You Love Me More) – Ryeowook
4. 사랑 할 수 있을 때 – Bobby Kim and Gilme
5. I LOVE YOU – Narsha feat. Miryo
6. 이 느낌
7. 스파이 명월
8. 하루
9. I LOVE YOU (Inst.)
10. 사랑 할 수 있을 때 (Inst.)
11. 더 사랑한다면 (Inst.)
12. 세상 그 누구보다 (Inst.)
13. 사랑이 무서워 (Inst.)

== Controversy ==
Following a dispute with director Hwang In-hyuk over her working conditions, Han Ye-seul failed to show up for her scheduled filming on August 14–15, 2011, then flew to Los Angeles on August 16. Her agency, SidusHQ, attributed her absence to conflicts with the director over her working conditions, saying that exhaustion had affected her judgment. Due to her absence, an episode was cancelled and instead a special featuring highlights of the series was aired. Korean media described it as the first instance of a lead actor abruptly leaving in the middle of a drama shoot. After extensive press coverage and threats of legal action, Han returned to the set on August 18 and apologized to her fans.

== International broadcast ==
Country	Network(s)/Station(s)	Series premiere	Title
Thailand	Channel 7	January 30, 2014	สายลับหน้าใส พิชิตใจซูเปอร์สตาร์ (Sailab Nasai Pichitjai Superstar; literally: "Baby Faced Spy")
Malaysia	TV2	April 23, 2016	Spy Myung-Wol
