= Penny Pinchers =

2011 South Korean romantic comedy film

- Theatrical poster
- Directed by: Kim Jung-hwan
- Written by: Kim Jung-hwan
- Produced by: Stanley Kwak; Jung Hoon-tak
- Starring: Han Ye-seul; Song Joong-ki
- Cinematography: Hong Seong-hyuk
- Edited by: Kim Sun-min
- Music by: Lee Byung-hoon
- Production companies: Indiestory iHQ
- Distributed by: Filament Pictures
- Release date: November 10, 2011
- Running time: 114 minutes
- Country: South Korea
- Language: Korean
- Box office: US$2.7 million

Penny Pinchers (Korean: 티끌모아 로맨스; RR: Tikkeulmoa romaenseu; lit. 'Penny-Pinching Romance') is a 2011 South Korean romantic comedy film written and directed Kim Jung-hwan, starring Han Ye-seul and Song Joong-ki.

Kim received a Best New Director nomination at the 48th Baeksang Arts Awards in 2012.

== Plot ==
Chun Ji-woong is an unemployed college graduate who continually fails job interviews and lives off an allowance from his mother, who runs a small restaurant in the countryside. Ji-woong is an eternal optimist, but having no money is cramping his dating life when he can't even afford to buy a pack of condoms. Yet despite living in a tiny, dingy apartment in a low-income neighborhood, he's about to get evicted when his mother abruptly cuts him off and he can't pay the rent.

Gu Hong-sil lives in the apartment opposite Ji-woong's. Hong-sil is extremely frugal; she collects then sells recyclables, rummages through abandoned homes, steals sugar from coffee shops, and will walk anywhere within 10 kilometers (6.2 miles) to save on bus fare. She denounces all activities that involve wasting money, such as going to church and the hospital, and even dating. Romance is the last thing on Hong-sil's mind, she considers it a luxury and an unnecessary frivolity.

Hong-sil's favorite hobby is depositing her savings at the bank, but her plans are brought to a screeching halt when she learns that she needs a separate bank account under someone else's name to reach her goal of ₩200 million (US$200 000). So she tells Ji-woong that she'll teach him the art of penny-pinching and include him in a short-term moneymaking scheme if he follows whatever she tells him to do for the next two months.

== Cast ==
- Han Ye-seul as Gu Hong-sil
- Song Joong-ki as Chun Ji-woong
- Shin So-yul as Ha Kyung-joo
- Lee Sang-yeob as Yang Gwan-woo
- Lee Jae-won as Tae-woo
- Lee Yong-joo as Chang-geun
- Kim Dong-hyun as Hong-sil's father
- Moon Se-yoon as Sysop
- Ra Mi-ran as Ji-woong's landlady

== Release ==
Penny Pinchers was released in theaters on November 10, 2011. It was not a big commercial success, grossing US$2,707,761 on 424,002 admissions.

It also screened at the 4th Okinawa International Movie Festival in 2012.
