= Couple or Trouble =

2006 South Korean television series

- (from left) Oh Ji-ho, Han Ye-seul and Kim Sung-min
- Also known as: Fantasy Couple; Couple of Fantasy; Fantastic Couple
- Genre: Romantic comedy
- Based on: Overboard (1987 film) by Leslie Dixon
- Written by: Hong Jung-eun Hong Mi-ran
- Directed by: Kim Sang-ho
- Starring: Han Ye-seul; Oh Ji-ho
- Music by: Kim Hyun-jeong
- Country of origin: South Korea
- Original language: Korean
- No. of episodes: 16

Production
- Running time: 60 minutes
- Production company: Creative Leaders Group 8

Original release
- Network: MBC TV
- Release: October 14 – December 3, 2006

Couple or Trouble (Korean: 환상의 커플; RR: Hwansangui keopeul; lit. 'Fantasy Couple') is a 2006 South Korean television series loosely based on the 1987 Hollywood film Overboard. Starring Han Ye-seul and Oh Ji-ho, it aired on MBC from October 14 to December 3, 2006, on Saturdays and Sundays at 21:40 for 16 episodes. The series' ratings rose steadily during its run, with the final episode recording a series high of 21.4% according to AGB Nielsen, and it received recognition at the MBC Drama Awards.

== Plot ==
Anna Jo (Han Ye-seul) is a rude, spoiled heiress raised in the United States who treats her husband, Billy Park (Kim Sung-min), with contempt. While her yacht is docked for repairs, she hires local handyman Jang Chul-soo (Oh Ji-ho) to fix her shower; after a dispute over his work and her refusal to pay, she pushes him overboard along with his tools. Later, after a quarrel with Billy, Anna herself falls overboard while drunk and loses her memory.

In the hospital, she ends up beside Chul-soo, who is recovering after diving for his lost tools. Chul-soo, who is raising his three orphaned nephews and needs help at home, takes advantage of her amnesia by convincing her that she is his live-in girlfriend, Na Sang-shil. Over time, Anna's selfishness gives way to compassion, and the two fall in love. When she eventually regains her memory, Anna prepares to leave for the United States, but chooses to stay with Chul-soo.

== Production ==
The series was Han Ye-seul's first drama in about a year, following That Summer's Typhoon (2005). After reading the script, Han personally visited the production company, Group Eight, to ask for the role of Anna; director Kim Sang-ho later said that no other actress could have played the part better.

== Cast ==
=== Main characters ===
- Han Ye-seul as Anna Jo / Na Sang-shil
- Oh Ji-ho as Jang Chul-soo
- Kim Sung-min as Billy Park
- Park Han-byul as Oh Yoo-kyung

=== Supporting characters ===
- Kim Kwang-kyu as Department head Gong
- Kim Jung-wook as Ha Deok-gu
- Lee Mi-young as Oh Kye-joo
- Jung Soo-young as Kang-ja
- Lee Suk-min as Jang Joon-seok
- Kim Tae-yoon as Jang Yoon-seok
- Park Joon-mok as Jang Geun-seok
- Lee Sang-yi as Shim Hyo-jung

== Reception ==
The series grew in popularity during its second half, with several of Anna's lines becoming popular catchphrases among viewers. Han's performance was also praised by critics who had previously dismissed her acting.

== Awards and nominations ==
2006 MBC Drama Awards

- Drama of the Year
- Excellence Award, Actress: Han Ye-seul
- Popularity Award, Actress: Han Ye-seul
- Popularity Award, Actor: Oh Ji-ho
- Best Couple: Oh Ji-ho and Han Ye-seul
- Nomination - Excellence Award, Actor: Oh Ji-ho

2007 43rd Baeksang Arts Awards

- Popularity Award (TV): Han Ye-seul
- Nomination - Best Actress (TV): Han Ye-seul
- Nomination - Best New Director (TV): Kim Sang-ho
- Nomination - Best Screenplay (TV): Hong Jung-eun, Hong Mi-ran

== Ratings ==
Episode	Original broadcast date	Nielsen	TNS
1	2006-10-14	10.4%	11.1%
2	2006-10-15	9.9%	10.9%
3	2006-10-21	11.0%	12.5%
4	2006-10-22	11.7%	13.6%
5	2006-10-28	14.6%	16.6%
6	2006-10-29	11.8%	15.1%
7	2006-11-04	11.4%	11.7%
8	2006-11-05	11.4%	13.7%
9	2006-11-11	12.9%	13.5%
10	2006-11-12	13.2%	13.7%
11	2006-11-18	-	14.9%
12	2006-11-19	15.8%	16.1%
13	2006-11-25	14.1%	16.4%
14	2006-11-26	16.7%	17.7%
15	2006-12-02	18.6%	22.1%
16	2006-12-03	21.4%	22.7%

The series averaged 13.6% according to AGB Nielsen.
