= Lord of Shanghai (TV series) =

2015 Hong Kong TV series

- Official poster
- Also known as: The Hero
- 梟雄
- Genre: Period drama, Crime, Politics
- Created by: Hong Kong Television Broadcasts Limited
- Written by: Cheng Sing-mo, Au Yuk-han, Tsang Han, So Jat-kit, Cheung Kai-wing, Cheung Chung-yan, Shum Lap-keung
- Starring: Anthony Wong; Kent Tong; Wayne Lai; Kenneth Ma; Myolie Wu; Louisa So; Ron Ng; Alice Chan; Eddie Kwan; Raymond Cho; Mat Yeung; Ngo Ka-nin; Natalie Tong; Lau Kong; KK Cheung; Jade Leung
- Opening theme: "Black Rain" (黑雨)
- Ending theme: "Regretless" (歲月無悔) by Alfred Hui
- Composer: Alan Cheung
- Country of origin: Hong Kong
- Original language: Cantonese
- No. of episodes: 32

Production
- Executive producer: Catherine Tsang
- Producer: Amy Wong
- Production locations: Hong Kong; Shanghai
- Editor: Ng Siu-tung
- Running time: 45 minutes
- Production company: TVB

Original release
- Network: TVB Jade, HD Jade
- Release: 26 October – 29 November 2015

Lord of Shanghai
- Traditional Chinese: 梟雄
Transcriptions
Standard Mandarin
- Hanyu Pinyin: Xiāo Xióng
Yue: Cantonese
- Yale Romanization: Hīu Hùhng
- Jyutping: Hiu1 Hung4

Lord of Shanghai (Chinese: 梟雄) is a 2015 Hong Kong television pre-modern period drama produced by Amy Wong for TVB. It premiered on TVB Jade and HD Jade on 26 October 2015 airing every Monday through Sunday during its 9:30–10:30 pm timeslot with a total of 32 episodes.

The drama is the last of TVB's four 2015 grand anniversary dramas to be broadcast.

The drama, set in the 1930s Shanghai tells the story of three powerful business tycoons portrayed by Anthony Wong, Kent Tong, and Wayne Lai. It is based on a true story about three gangsters in the 1930s Shanghai whose names were Du Yuesheng (Kiu Ngo Tin), Huang Jinrong (Chak Kam Tong) and Zhang Xiaolin (Kung Siu San).

== Synopsis ==
In a time when Shanghai was controlled by the merciless warlords, sworn brothers Kiu Ngo Tin (Anthony Wong) and Kung Siu San (Wayne Lai) have to rely on each other. Together, the ruthless Siu San and the cunning Ngo Tin create a world of their own, but in order to stay on top, Ngo Tin has no choice but to leave his past behind completely, including his confidant and true love Ku Siu Lau (Myolie Wu), a Peking opera apprentice.

Ngo Tin gets the attention of casino boss Yiu Gwai Sang (Alice Chan), who recommends him to her husband Kam Tong (Kent Tong), Shanghai's most powerful tycoon. Along with Siu San, Ngo Tin and Kam Tong become legendary figures in Shanghai, dominating all lands of The Bund.

But a single city cannot accommodate three leaders; Siu San (Wayne Lai) and Kam Tong (Kent Tong) enter a battle for power, creating havoc in Shanghai. Ngo Tin (Anthony Wong) uses this opportunity to suppress both of them, becoming the sole leader of China's largest port city, controlling the police and the underground triads on both fronts.

Amidst the glitz and the glamour, Shanghai enters a period of chaos when the Japanese Empire starts making moves to attack the city. To protect his people and the country, Ngo Tin (Anthony Wong) donates his wealth and time to deflect the Japanese. But Siu San (Wayne Lai), in an attempt to save himself, becomes a traitor and works for the Japanese army. For his people, Ngo Tin (Anthony Wong) has no choice but to forsake his family loyalty, and destroy everyone in his way.

== Cast ==
=== Main cast ===
Cast	Role	Description
Anthony Wong	Kiu Ngo Tin (喬傲天)	One of the three Shanghai tycoons Unlike the other two tycoons, he is a righteous man and has a sense of justice Ku Siu Lau's love interest Killed Siu San because of his crimes as a traitor during the Japanese Occupation; Left Shanghai and was forced to stay in Hong Kong after being betrayed by Siu Kwong; Younger version portrayed by Kenneth Ma; The character is based on the Shanghai gangster Du Yuesheng
Wayne Lai	Kung Siu San (龔嘯山)	Main Villain; One of the three Shanghai tycoons Nicknamed Mad Dog (癲狗). Although he doesn't fool around with women, remaining faithful to his wife, he stops at nothing when it comes to evil He would do anything to achieve his goals, even by killing but he would not kill his wife, whom he only loves, and his son. He betrays the other two tycoons in collaborating with the Japanese in the later parts of the drama. He was killed by Ngo-tin in episode 31; The character is based on the Shanghai gangster Zhang Xiaolin
Kent Tong	Chak Kam Tong (翟金棠)	One of the three Shanghai tycoons A domineering person who would do anything to get on top He is extremely flirtatious, getting caught by his wife Gwai Sang flirting with his lover and his maid He holds strong grudges against Siu San; He dies at the hands of the Japanese, which is caused by Siu San, to protect his wife and people The character is based on the Shanghai gangster Huang Jinrong

=== Supporting cast ===
Cast	Role	Description
Ron Ng	Lai Siu Kwong (黎兆匡)	Villain at the end of the drama A lawyer He helps Ngo-tin build his empire and helps him solve many cases, but betrays Ngo-tin after the War; Chu Ting Ting's boyfriend He is Ngo-tin's closest disciple Married Chu Ting Ting after the war with the Japanese but divorced in episode 32 when she founds out his evil deeds Responsible for the death of Hon Lei in episode 32; The character is based on the vice-mayor of Shanghai Wu Shaoshu
Myolie Wu	Ku Siu Lau (顧小樓)	Peking opera apprentice Ngo Tin's confidant Ngo Tin's first love ever since he was young but failed to chase her She helps Ngo Tin to fight with the Japanese but was killed when one of the soldiers shot her The character is based on a historical figure named Meng Xiaodong
Kenneth Ma	Kiu Ngo Tin (喬傲天)	Kenneth portraying as young Kiu Ngo Tin, one of the three main tycoons in Shanghai on the flashback scenes. The character is later portrayed by Anthony Wong; The character is based on the Shanghai gangster Du Yuesheng
Louisa So	Cho Yuet Lan (曹月蘭)	Ngo Tin's Wife who trusts him every time, even when the world turn against Ngo Tin; She looks up to Ngo Tin and cares for him unconditionally
Jade Leung	Lau Mei Kam (劉美琴)	Siu San's Wife; He cares for Siu San and his son unconditionally and does not like it when Siu San works with the Japanese
Alice Chan	Yiu Kwai Sang (姚桂生)	Kam Tong's wife but later divorced An affectionate and righteous triad boss lady She died during the war with the Japanese as mentioned by Siu Kwong in episode 31
Eddie Kwan	Hon Lei (韓立)	A political party member's right-handed man who helps Ngo-Tin to fight with the Japanese; Died in a car accident indirectly caused by Siu Kwong; The character is based on a historical figure Dai Li
Jess Sum	Chuk Yee Hong (祝綺紅)	Cabaret singer, Kam Tong's mistress
Natalie Tong	Lee Tsz Ching (李芷晶)	A maid who experiences many ups and downs.
Grace Wong	Chor Ting Ting (楚婷婷)	A righteous reporter who hopes to expose the darkness of society Siu Kwong's girlfriend Married Siu Kwong after the war with the Japanese but later divorced in episode 32 when she found out Siu Kwong's bad deeds
Derek Wong	Luk King Chuen (陸敬泉)	Ngo-tin's student He is a deputy editor in chief on the surface, but he is actually Ngo-tin's informant He is Chu Ting Ting's senior.
Pierre Ngo	Mo Kwun Chiu (毛冠潮)	A union's leader who is very patriotic He helps Ngo-tin and the country fight the Japanese but is later shot dead by the Japanese soldiers The character is based on a historical figure Wang Yaqiao
Tracy Ip	Ching Siu Dip (楚志文)	An actress, revealed to be a government spy who uncovered files on Japanese biological weapons facility Unit 1644.
Yeung Chiu Hoi	Chor Chi Man (楚志文)	

== Development and production ==
n August 2013, a press conference was held by TVB announcing future drama collaborations with veteran Hong Kong actor Anthony Wong in order to boost sagging ratings and appease viewers complaints of poorly produced dramas.

Anthony Wong was confirmed to star as the lead for a future drama to be produced by Amy Wong in January 2014. Wong specifically chose to star in an Amy Wong production because during Wong's early years as a struggle actor producer Amy Wong gave him his big break when she helped him get signed to TVB.

Aimee Chan was the first TVB artiste announced to be starring with Wong in an upcoming TVB drama in mid January 2014. However Chan later turned down the role when she became pregnant with her second child. Myolie Wu was later re-cast in the role.

In May 2014, veteran former TVB actor Kent Tong was announced with Wayne Lai, Ron Ng and Pierre Ngo to be part of the main cast. The drama would be Tong's first TVB drama in 30 years.

The rest of the main cast (Myolie Wu, Louisa So, Kenneth Ma, and Natalie Tong) were introduced during a press conference held on 3 June 2014.

The costume fitting ceremony was held on 19 June 2014 at Tseung Kwan O TVB City Studio One Common Room at 12:30 pm.

The blessing ceremony took place on 29 July 2014 at 3:30 pm Tseung Kwan O TVB City Studio One.

Filming took place from June till November 2014 on location in Hong Kong and Shanghai, China.

Filming on location in Shanghai began in mid-September till end of November 2014. Wong had initially refused to film when in Shanghai due to poor living conditions TVB provided and refusing to provide separate living quarters for his female assistant. After TVB discussed the issue with Wong's management company Emperor Entertainment Group, his management company agreed to pay the cost difference of upping Wong to a better hotel and paying travel expenses for his assistant.

Lord of Shanghai is Myolie Wu and Ron Ng's last collaboration with TVB as Wu choose not to renew her contract with TVB in order to prepare for her upcoming marriage to boyfriend Phillip Lee and Ng's contract was not renewed and still in discussion when it expired due to Ng's father's death.

A promo image of Lord of Shanghai was featured in TVB's 2015 calendar for the month of November, released in October 2014.

In March 2015, Lord of Shanghai was one of ten TVB dramas previewed at FILMART 2015.

During the time when Kenneth Ma was portraying the younger version of Kiu Ngo Tin his voice was dubbed by Maxwell Hui to make his voice sound more like the voice of Anthony Wong.

== Viewership ratings ==
Timeslot (HKT)	#	Day(s)	Week	Episode(s)	Average points	Peaking points
Mon – Sun (9:30–10:30 pm); 21:30–22:30	1	Mon – Fri	26 – 30 October 2015	1–5	25	27
Mon – Sun (9:30–10:30 pm); 21:30–22:30	1	Sat	31 Oct 2015	6	18	–
Mon – Sun (9:30–10:30 pm); 21:30–22:30	2	Mon – Fri	2 – 6 November 2015	7–11	26	28
Mon – Sun (9:30–10:30 pm); 21:30–22:30	2	Sat	7 Nov 2015	12	19	–
Mon – Sun (9:30–10:30 pm); 21:30–22:30	2	Sun	8 Nov 2015	13	22	–
Mon – Sun (9:30–10:30 pm); 21:30–22:30	3	Mon – Fri	9 – 13 November 2015	14–18	25	27
Mon – Sun (9:30–10:30 pm); 21:30–22:30	3	Sat	14 Nov 2015	19	18	–
Mon – Sun (9:30–10:30 pm); 21:30–22:30	3	Sun	15 Nov 2015	20	24	–
Mon – Sun (9:30–10:30 pm); 21:30–22:30	4	Mon – Fri	16 – 20 November 2015	21–25	25	29
Mon – Sun (9:30–10:30 pm); 21:30–22:30	4	Sun	22 Nov 2015	26	23	–
Mon – Sun (9:30–10:30 pm); 21:30–22:30	5	Mon – Fri	23 – 27 November 2015	27–30	26	32
Mon – Sun (9:30–10:30 pm); 21:30–22:30	5	Sat	28 Nov 2015	31	24	–
Mon – Sun (9:30–10:30 pm); 21:30–22:30	5	Sun	29 Nov 2015	32	29	–
Total average					25	32

== International broadcast ==
Network	Country	Airing Date	Timeslot
Astro On Demand	Malaysia	26 October 2015	Monday – Sunday 9:30 – 10:15 pm
NTV7	Malaysia	9 May 2017	Monday – Wednesday 11:00 pm – 12:00 am
TVBJ	Australia	27 October 2015	Monday – Sunday 12:30 – 1:30 am
Starhub TV	Singapore	4 February 2016	Monday – Sunday 9:00 – 10:00 pm
5 HD1	Thailand	17 January 2018	Every Wednesday and Thursday 20:20 – 21:20

== Awards and nominations ==
Year	Ceremony	Category	Nominee	Result
2015	TVB Star Awards Malaysia	My Favourite TVB Drama Series	Lord of Shanghai	Nominated
2015	TVB Star Awards Malaysia	My Favourite TVB Actor in a Leading Role	Anthony Wong	Nominated
2015	TVB Star Awards Malaysia	My Favourite TVB Actor in a Leading Role	Kent Tong	Nominated
2015	TVB Star Awards Malaysia	My Favourite TVB Actor in a Leading Role	Wayne Lai	Nominated
2015	TVB Star Awards Malaysia	My Favourite TVB Actress in a Supporting Role	Natalie Tong	Nominated
2015	TVB Star Awards Malaysia	My Favourite TVB Drama Theme Song	Regretless (歲月無悔) by Alfred Hui	Nominated
2015	TVB Star Awards Malaysia	Astro MY FM's Special Pick for TVB Drama Theme Song	Regretless (歲月無悔) by Alfred Hui	Won
2015	TVB Star Awards Malaysia	My Favourite Top 16 TVB Drama Characters	Wayne Lai	Won
2015	TVB Anniversary Awards	TVB Anniversary Award for Best Drama	Lord of Shanghai	Won
2015	TVB Anniversary Awards	TVB Anniversary Award for Best Actor	Anthony Wong	Won
2015	TVB Anniversary Awards	TVB Anniversary Award for Best Actor	Kent Tong	Nominated
2015	TVB Anniversary Awards	TVB Anniversary Award for Best Actor	Wayne Lai	Nominated
2015	TVB Anniversary Awards	TVB Anniversary Award for Best Actor	Kenneth Ma	Nominated
2015	TVB Anniversary Awards	TVB Anniversary Award for Best Actress	Louisa So	Nominated
2015	TVB Anniversary Awards	TVB Anniversary Award for Best Actress	Alice Chan	Nominated
2015	TVB Anniversary Awards	TVB Anniversary Award for Best Supporting Actor	Willie Wai	Won
2015	TVB Anniversary Awards	TVB Anniversary Award for Best Supporting Actress	Jade Leung	Nominated
2015	TVB Anniversary Awards	TVB Anniversary Award for Most Popular Male Character	Anthony Wong	Nominated
2015	TVB Anniversary Awards	TVB Anniversary Award for Most Popular Male Character	Kent Tong	Nominated
2015	TVB Anniversary Awards	TVB Anniversary Award for Most Popular Male Character	Wayne Lai	Nominated
2015	TVB Anniversary Awards	TVB Anniversary Award for Most Popular Male Character	Kenneth Ma	Nominated
2015	TVB Anniversary Awards	TVB Anniversary Award for Most Popular Female Character	Louisa So	Nominated
2015	TVB Anniversary Awards	TVB Anniversary Award for Most Popular Female Character	Alice Chan	Nominated
2015	TVB Anniversary Awards	TVB Anniversary Award for Most Popular Female Character	Jade Leung	Nominated
2015	TVB Anniversary Awards	TVB Anniversary Award for Favourite Drama Song	Regretless (歲月無悔) by Alfred Hui	Nominated
2016	StarHub TVB Awards	My Favourite TVB Drama	Lord of Shanghai	Nominated
2016	StarHub TVB Awards	My Favourite TVB Actress	Alice Chan	Nominated
2016	StarHub TVB Awards	My Favourite TVB Male TV Character	Kenneth Ma	Won
2016	StarHub TVB Awards	My Favourite TVB Female TV Character	Alice Chan	Won
2016	StarHub TVB Awards	TVB Anniversary Award for Favourite Drama Song	Regretless (歲月無悔) by Alfred Hui	Nominated
