= The Axe Gang =

Fictional Chinese gang

- Founded: 1921
- Founding location: China
- Territory: Shanghai, China
- Ethnicity: Chinese
- Leader: Wang Yaqiao
- Activities: Assault, burglary, extortion, fraud, murder
- Rivals: Triads

The Axe Gang (Simplified Chinese: 斧头帮; traditional Chinese: 斧頭幫; pinyin: fǔ tóu bāng; Zhuyin Fuhao: ㄈㄨˇ ㄊㄡˊ ㄅㄤˉ) is a reference to a gang founded in 1921, but is currently used for show in cinema. It has appeared in Hong Kong martial arts films.

The fictional version of the Axe Gang is based on a real-life Axe Gang in Shanghai around Japanese Occupation with a leader named Wang Yaqiao.

== Background ==
The Axe Gang had control over Shanghai and used axes as a weapon of choice, usually dressed in black suits and sometimes top hats. Boxer From Shantung is perhaps the gang's earliest appearance, though they are not formally called Axe Gang within the film. The gang also appears in Project A Part II, Drunken Master II, Marrying the Mafia II, Kung Fu Hustle, Shanghai Affairs, and Ip Man: Kung Fu Master. A Hatchet Gang was depicted in Netflix's Iron Fist.

== In Kung Fu Hustle ==
In the martial-arts film Kung Fu Hustle, the Axe Gang is run in a way very similar to the Italian crime mafia families or the major Chinese Triads. The Axe Gang is led by Brother Sum. Two crossed axes forming an "X" can be seen as their recognizable logo in Kung Fu Hustle, which many if not all members have tattooed on their bodies somewhere, visible or otherwise. The gang is shown doing dance moves in Kung Fu Hustle reminiscent of 1950s musicals.

== Films ==
- Boxer From Shantung (1972)
- Queen Boxer (1972)
- Project A Part II (1987)
- Drunken Master II (1994)
- A Chinese Odyssey (1995)
- Fist of Fury (1995)
- Hero (1997)
- Shanghai Affairs (1998)
- Kung Fu Hustle (2004)
- Marrying the Mafia II (2005)
- Ip Man (2008)
- Warrior (2019)

== See also ==
- Hatchet man
