= The Last Tycoon (2012 film) =

2012 Hong Kong film by Wong Jing

- Film poster

Chinese name
- Traditional Chinese: 大上海
- Simplified Chinese: 大上海
Transcriptions
Standard Mandarin
- Hanyu Pinyin: Dà Shànghǎi
Yue: Cantonese
- Jyutping: Daai6 Soeng5-hoi2
- Directed by: Wong Jing
- Screenplay by: Wong Jing; Phillip Lui; Manfred Wong
- Produced by: Andrew Lau
- Starring: Chow Yun-fat; Sammo Hung; Francis Ng; Huang Xiaoming
- Cinematography: Andrew Lau; Jason Kwan
- Edited by: Azrael Chung
- Music by: Chan Kwong-wing; Chen Zhiyi
- Production companies: Mega Vision Pictures; Beijing Enlight Pictures; Bona Film Group
- Distributed by: Distribution Workshop
- Release dates: 22 December 2012 (China); 3 January 2013 (Hong Kong)
- Running time: 118 minutes (Worldwide); 107 minutes (China)
- Country: Hong Kong
- Language: Cantonese
- Box office: ¥126 million (China)

The Last Tycoon (Chinese: 大上海) is a 2012 Hong Kong period drama film directed by Wong Jing, starring Chow Yun-fat, Sammo Hung, Francis Ng and Huang Xiaoming. The film was released in mainland China on 22 December 2012, and in Hong Kong on 3 January 2013. The story is loosely inspired by the life of Du Yuesheng, a prominent mob boss in Shanghai in the 1920s and 1930s.

== Plot ==
The story begins in the 1910s in Republican China. Cheng Daqi, a fruit vendor from Chuansha, is arrested and imprisoned after being framed for murder. After he is saved by a military officer Mao Zai, he travels to Shanghai in search of a new life. In Shanghai, he meets mob boss Hong Shouting and becomes one of Hong's protégés. He also falls in love with Bao, a singer whom he eventually marries. His true love, however, is Ye Zhiqiu, an opera actress from his hometown. When Hong unknowingly offends the son of the warlord General Lu and gets captured by the general's men, Cheng negotiates with General Lu and manages to persuade him to release Hong and invest in Hong's bank. A grateful Hong becomes sworn brothers with Cheng, putting Cheng in a more powerful position in Shanghai's underworld.

20 years later, a middle-aged Cheng has become one of Shanghai's most influential tycoons; amongst his entourage are his childhood friend Xiaopang and rival-turned-bodyguard Lin Huai. He maintains close ties with Hong and Hong's wife, Ling Husheng. At the same time, he has a shaky relationship with Mao Zai, now a general in the National Revolutionary Army. He meets his old flame, Ye Zhiqiu, when she visits Shanghai, but she is already married to Cheng Zhaimei, an anti-government activist. They are caught up in the events of the Second Sino-Japanese War, which breaks out in 1937. After surviving an air raid and an abduction attempt by the Japanese, Cheng gets Mao to help him arrange for him, Ye and her husband to escape to Hong Kong. However, he is forced to leave Bao behind as a hostage. After the fall of Shanghai, Mao defects to the Japanese and becomes a provincial governor. The Japanese general Nishino wants to make Cheng the puppet mayor of Shanghai, so Mao suggests that he keeps Cheng's loved ones alive and use them to lure Cheng back to Shanghai. Meanwhile in Hong Kong, Cheng and Ye learn that Hong, Ling and others have been captured, tortured and humiliated by the Japanese.

Cheng and Ye return to Shanghai and reluctantly cooperate with the Japanese. They secretly plan to save their loved ones and assassinate Nishino. One evening, while Nishino and Mao Zai are distracted by an opera performance by Ye and her troupe in a theatre, Cheng, rejoined by Lin Huai, Xiaopang and his mob, leads a raid on the Japanese military base where Hong, Ling and the others are held. They manage to free the prisoners but are too late to save Ling and Hong. Lin Huai sacrifices himself to stop the pursuing Japanese soldiers, while Cheng, Ye and their companions launch an attack on the theatre, killing Nishino and several Japanese officers and collaborators. Mao flees backstage, where he holds Ye at gunpoint and threatens to kill her if Cheng does not surrender. Just then, Bao shows up and sacrifices herself to save Ye from Mao. Upon witnessing Bao's death, Cheng breaks down and kills Mao, riddling his body with bullets. Cheng then walks out of the theatre with Bao in his arms but finds the place surrounded by Japanese soldiers. Together with Bao and Xiaopang, he takes shelter in a car and they all die when the soldiers open fire at them.

== Cast ==
- Chow Yun-fat as Cheng Daqi, a character inspired by Shanghai-based mob boss Du Yuesheng.
  - Huang Xiaoming as Cheng Daqi (younger)
- Sammo Hung as Hong Shouting, a character based on mob boss Huang Jinrong.
- Francis Ng as Mao Zai, a character based on spymaster Dai Li and mob boss Zhang Xiaolin.
- Yuan Quan as Ye Zhiqiu, a character based on opera actress Meng Xiaodong.
  - Feng Wenjuan as Ye Zhiqiu (younger)
- Monica Mok as Bao
  - Kimmy Tong as Bao (younger)
- Yuan Li as Ling Husheng, a character based on Huang Jinrong's wife Lin Jiasheng.
- Gao Hu as Lin Huai, a character based on Zhang Xiaolin's bodyguard Lin Huaibu.
- Xin Baiqing as Cheng Zhaimei
- Yasuaki Kurata as Major-General Nishino
- Han Zhi as General Lu, a character based on warlord Lu Yongxiang.
- Qi Ji as Lu Xiaojia, a character based on Lu Yongxiang's son Lu Xiaojia.
- Zheng Yitong as Xiaolanchun, a character based on opera actress Lulanchun.
- Yang Dapeng as Xiaopang

== Release ==
The film was shown at the 2013 Hong Kong International Film Festival.

== Music ==
The film's music was composed by Chan Kwong-wing. The theme song, Ding Feng Bo (定風波), was composed by Leon Ko and sung in Mandarin by Jacky Cheung, with its lyrics written by Chris Shum. Ding Feng Bo won the Best Original Song at the 32nd Hong Kong Film Awards.

Yi Sheng Shou Hou (一生守候), another song from the film, was performed by Joanna Wang.

== Reception ==
The Last Tycoon earned HK$5,787,307 at the Hong Kong box office and has grossed ¥126 million in mainland China as of 6 January 2013.

== Awards and nominations ==
32nd Hong Kong Film Awards

- Nominated Best Cinematography (Andrew Lau and Jason Kwan)
- Nominated Best Original Film Score (Chan Kwong-wing and Yu Peng)
- Nominated Best New Performer (Feng Wenjuan)
- Won Best Art Direction (Yee Chung-Man and Eric Lam)
- Won Best Original Film Song (Ding Feng Bo; Leon Ko, Chris Shum and Jacky Cheung)

7th Asian Film Awards

- Nominated Best Production Designer (Yee Chung-Man and Eric Lam)
- Nominated Best Costume Designer (Dai Mei-ling and Chan Chi-man)
