= Guilin Park =

Park in Shanghai, China

- 桂林公园
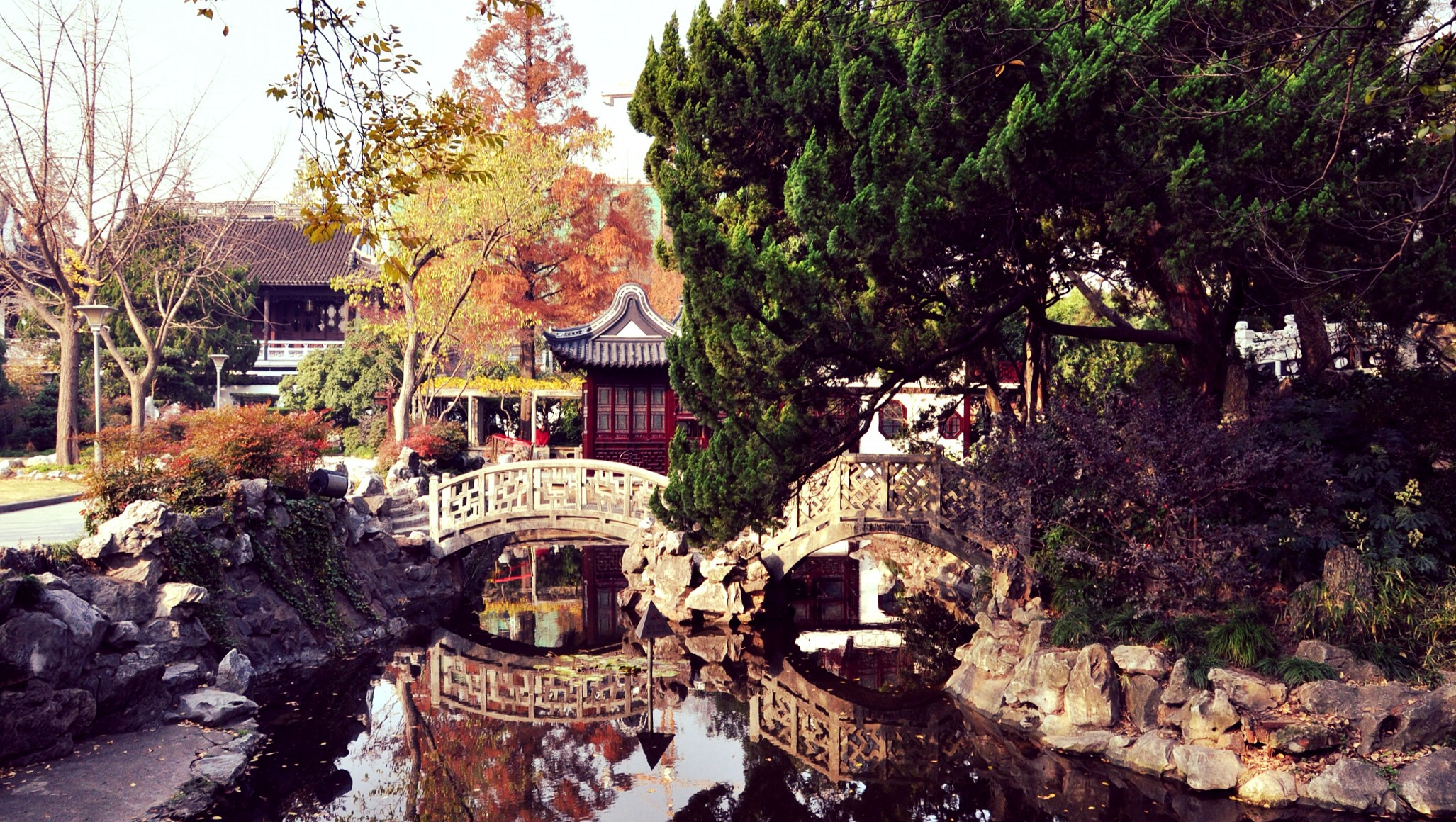
- Interactive map of Guilin Park
- Type: Urban park
- Location: Xuhui District, Shanghai, China
- Coordinates: 31.167644°N 121.413292°E
- Created: 1929
- Status: Open all year

Guilin Park (Chinese: 桂林公园; pinyin: Guìlín Gōngyuán) is a public park in Shanghai, China. It is located at the homonymous metro station on line 12 and line 15.

== History ==
Established in 1929 as a private residence of Huang Jinrong, the park covers a total area of 35,500 square meters. Huang died in 1953. In 1958 it became a public park maintained by the Shanghai Garden Management Office and it received the name Guilin Park due to the garden's osmanthus trees.

The park was damaged during the Cultural Revolution when the group of sculptures "Eight Immortals crossing the Sea" was destroyed.

== Sights ==
Just like ancient Chinese gardens, it is densely decorated and planted with a vast variety of trees, including more than 1000 osmanthus trees. This is one of the few parks in Shanghai that kept most of the aspects of traditional Chinese garden design, featuring gates, lakes, grottoes, rocks, curved paths, animal-shaped stones, stele and pavilions. Although its area is relatively small, the architecture of different parts varies, as if it were made to showcase a historical Chinese garden. When the weather allows, nearby residents come here to play Go and Mahjong, sing or play music, do exercises, or relax lying on the meadow.

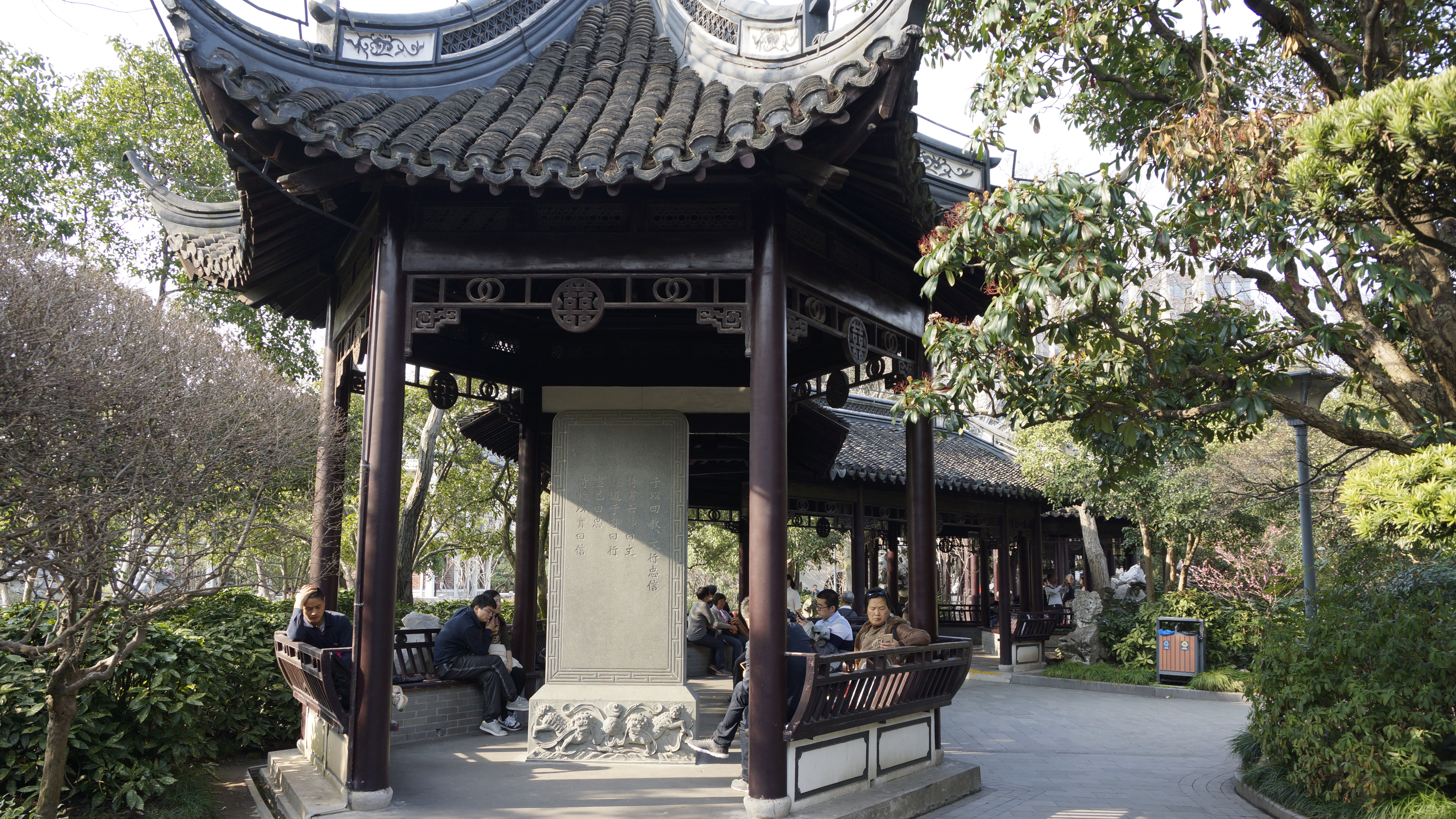
Stele in Guilin Park

The surrounding wall separates the park from the streets and creek, making it possible to close it for the late afternoon and night. Entrance fee is 2 yuan.

Just across the street there is the larger and more modern Kangjian Park.
