= Wang Yaqiao =

Chinese gangster

- 王亚樵
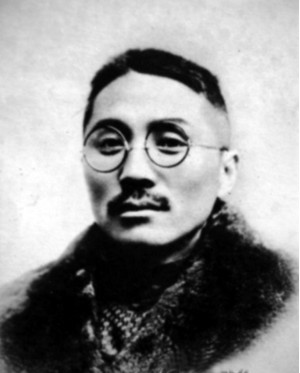
- Born: 2 September 1886; Hefei, Anhui Province
- Died: 20 September 1936 (aged 50); Wuzhou, Guangxi Province
- Cause of death: Assassination (gunshot wounds)
- Citizenship: Republic of China
- Occupations: Underworld leader, assassin, gangster
- Employer(s): Regional warlords, KMT government
- Organization: Anhui clique

Wang Yaqiao (Chinese: 王亚樵; 2 September 1887 – 20 September 1936) was a Chinese gangster and assassin leader.

== Biography ==
Wang was born Hefei, Anhui Province, to a country doctor.

After the Xinhai Revolution, he joined the Tongmenghui, who put him in a leadership position in organising a government in his hometown. However, Wang clashed with a rival Tongmenghui leader, Sun Pincan, over Sun's preferential treatment of the upper-class landed gentry and scholar-officials. After several of Wang's comrades were killed, he fled Anhui and attempted to gain support from his idol Sun Yat-sen by suggesting he kill Beiyang government leader Duan Qirui in a targeted bombing. Following the rejection of this plan, Wang switched to the Chinese Socialist Party and fled to Shanghai with his followers in 1913. In Shanghai, he began working with Zhang Renkui, a prominent leader of the Green Gang, best known as the mentor of fellow mobster Du Yuesheng. For a time, Wang mentored Dai Li, who would later become Chiang Kai-shek's secret police chief.

In 1920, Wang created the "Anhui Labor Union Federation" (安徽劳工总会), a labour union to protect the interests of Anhui migrant workers. The following year, Wang took leadership of the "Anhui Compatriots Association in Shanghai" (安徽旅沪同乡会) and merging the two organisations, the resultant union counted 100,000 members at its peak. At the time, merchants in Shanghai often used the services of criminal gangs for protection and Wang Yaqiao drew on this by arming members with axes. The union came to prominence after they stormed the compound of a local businessman who had injured several union workers during a wage dispute. Through the incident, Wang's group became known as the "Axe Gang" (斧头帮). The gang was responsible for several assassinations, both for criminal and political purposes. The Axe Gang's first assassination, that of Songhu Police Department Chief Xu Guoliang, served both ends, as it allowed criminal elements to exert increasing control over police, but also gained Wang favour with Zhejiang military governor and Anhui clique warlord Lu Yongxiang, as Xu was a confidante of Jiangsu military governor and Zhili clique warlord Qi Xieyuan.

In 1924, Lu Yongxiang's forces were defeated by Qi Xieyuan and from then on Wang's Anhui Gang was often employed by the New Guangxi clique. During the 1930s, Wang became notorious as "the king of assassins" for masterminding the killing of numerous Japanese servicemen and figures associated with China's puppet Nationalist government during Japanese occupation. He was linked to assassination attempts on T. V. Soong in 1931 and Wang Jingwei in 1935.

Wang eventually became one of China's most wanted criminals. For a time, he evaded the police in Hong Kong, but later escaped to Wuzhou. On 21 November 1936, he was assassinated in Wuzhou, though it remains unclear whether his killers were agents of the Nationalist government or members of the New Guangxi clique who wanted to cut ties with him.

== Bibliography ==
- Wakeman, Frederic (2003). Spymaster : Dai Li and the Chinese secret service. Berkeley, California: University of California Press.
