= Kung Fu Hustle =

2004 film by Stephen Chow

- Theatrical release poster
- Chinese: 功夫
- Hanyu Pinyin: Gōng Fū
- Jyutping: Gung1 Fu1
- Directed by: Stephen Chow
- Written by: Stephen Chow; Tsang Kan Cheung; Lola Huo; Chan Man Keung
- Produced by: Stephen Chow; Yang Bu Ting; Wang Zhong Jun; Chui Po Chu; Jeff Lau; Han San Ping; Wang Zhong Lei
- Starring: Stephen Chow; Danny Chan; Yuen Wah; Yuen Qiu; Eva Huang; Leung Siu-lung
- Cinematography: Poon Hang-sang
- Edited by: Angie Lam
- Music by: Raymond Wong
- Production companies: Columbia Pictures Film Production Asia; Huayi Brothers; Taihe Film Investment; Beijing Film Studio; China Film Group; Star Overseas
- Distributed by: Huayi Brothers (China); Columbia TriStar Film Distributors International (International)
- Release dates: 14 September 2004 (TIFF); 23 December 2004 (Hong Kong)
- Running time: 98 minutes
- Country: China
- Languages: Cantonese; Mandarin
- Budget: $20 million
- Box office: $104.9 million

Kung Fu Hustle (Chinese: 功夫; pinyin: Gōng Fū; lit. 'Kung Fu') is a 2004 martial arts action comedy film directed, produced and co-written by Stephen Chow, who also stars in the leading role, alongside Huang Shengyi, Yuen Wah, Yuen Qiu, Danny Chan Kwok-kwan and Leung Siu-lung in prominent roles. The story revolves around a murderous neighbourhood gang, a poor village with unlikely heroes and an aspiring gangster's fierce journey to find his true self. The martial arts choreography is supervised by Yuen Woo-ping. Film scholar Christina Klein describes Kung Fu Hustle as a transnational Chinese-language film whose mode of production is closely connected to its visual and narrative style.

The film was a co-production between Hong Kong and Mainland Chinese companies, filmed in Shanghai. After the commercial success of Shaolin Soccer, its production company, Star Overseas, began to develop the film with Columbia Pictures Film Production Asia in 2002. It features a number of retired actors famous for 1970s Hong Kong action cinema and has been compared to contemporary and influential wuxia films such as Crouching Tiger, Hidden Dragon and Hero. The cartoon special effects in the film, accompanied by traditional Chinese music, are often cited as its most striking feature.

Kung Fu Hustle premiered at the Toronto International Film Festival on September 14, 2004, and released on 23 December 2004 in China and on 25 January 2005 in the United States. The film received positive reviews and grossed US$17 million in North America and US$84 million in other regions. It was tenth on the list of highest-grossing foreign-language films in the United States as well as the highest-grossing foreign-language film in the country in 2005. Kung Fu Hustle won numerous awards, including six Hong Kong Film Awards and five Golden Horse Awards. The film was re-released in 3D in October 2014 across Asia and North America, marking the tenth anniversary of the film.

== Plot ==
In 1940s Shanghai, the Crocodile gang is easily and brutally defeated by a much more powerful gang known as the Axe Gang, led by a young killer named Brother Sum and an unnamed vice general. Only Shanghai's poorest villages and slums are not affected by the Axe gang's killings. One such slum is Pigsty Alley. Two thieves named Sing and Bone visit the village to extort the residents by pretending to be Axe gang members, though Sing and Bone are revealed to be very weak and terrible at fighting. Sing eventually attracts the attention of some real gang members and their vice general after throwing a firecracker onto the vice general's head. Just as the vice general is about to kill one of the residents, an unknown force blows him 50 feet back while also breaking his back, causing him to summon the full gang. Three of the slum's tenants: Coolie (who revealed himself to be the one who killed the vice general), Tailor, and Donut, are revealed to actually be kung fu masters, and the three of them team up to defend the slum and defeat the gang. Fearing the gang's retaliation, the slum's landlady evicts the trio after Brother Sum orders the gang's retreat.

The gang captures Sing and Bone, and Brother Sum tries to kill them for posing as gang members. However, Sing and Bone narrowly escape using their lock picking skills, impressing Brother Sum, who offers to let them join the Axe Gang, on the condition that they kill someone. Sing recalls his childhood to Bone when he was tricked by a vagrant into buying a martial arts pamphlet with his meager savings. After practicing the pamphlet's Buddhist Palm technique, Sing attempted to save a non-verbal girl named Fong from bullies, but instead he was beaten and urinated on. Sing became adamant that heroes never win, and he resolved to be a villain.

Sing and Bone return to Pigsty Alley to kill the landlady by throwing knives at her, but they fail ridiculously and Sing is stabbed several times and bitten by venomous snakes. They are chased off the premises by the landlady. Sing retreats to a traffic pulpit where his injuries mysteriously heal. Meanwhile, Brother Sum, intent on vengeance against Pigsty Alley, hires two harpists that use a magical guzheng as their weapon. On the same night, they successfully eliminate all three masters, but they are destroyed by the landlady and her husband the landlord, who reveal themselves to also be extremely skilled fighters.

The next morning, Sing attempts to rob an ice cream vendor, but discovers that she is actually Fong. When she recognizes him and offers him a lollipop, which reminds him of the day he tried to save her, he smashes it and leaves. When Sing returns to the gang's casino, Brother Sum offers him immediate gang membership if he uses his lock-picking skills to free The Beast, a legendary and extremely powerful assassin, from a mental asylum. Sing succeeds and brings The Beast back to the Axe Gang's headquarters.

Brother Sum is initially skeptical of The Beast due to his flippant attitude and sloppy appearance, but quickly changes his mind when The Beast stops a bullet in mid-air. The Beast meets the landlady and landlord at the casino next door, engaging them in a fierce fight that ends in a stalemate, despite the Beast showing much better fighting skills and clever trickery. Sing, realizing the error of his ways, attacks Brother Sum and The Beast, who angrily retaliates but accidentally unlocks the Ren and Du channels in Sing. The landlady and landlord grab the unconscious Sing and flee. The Beast kills an angry Brother Sum and takes over as leader of the Axe gang.

The landlady and landlord treat Sing at Pigsty Alley and are surprised by his quick recovery. The landlady deduces Sing is, in fact, a natural-born kung fu genius. With his new-found powers, Sing effortlessly dispatches hundreds of Axes before fighting The Beast. Sing uses the Buddhist Palm technique to neutralize the Beast, who concedes defeat.

Sing and Bone open a candy store with Fong's lollipop as their logo. Fong visits Sing at his store, and the pair hold each other's hands as they appear to be younger version of themselves. The vagrant who sold the pamphlet to Sing can be seen outside selling other pamphlets.

== Cast ==
- Stephen Chow as Sing, a loser in life who joins the Axe Gang but soon finds a higher calling. He specialises in the Fut Gar Buddhist Palm technique. After the Beast beats Sing to the brink of death, Sing "resets his qi flow", releasing the natural-born kung fu master within.
- Danny Chan Kwok-kwan as Brother Sum, the ambitious leader of the Axe Gang. Under his leadership, the Axe Gang wipes out all the other gangs of China.
- Yuen Qiu as the Landlady of Pigsty Alley. She is a master of the Lama Pai Lion's Roar technique. She has a sonic scream that can pierce through anything. The character is an allusion to Xiaolongnü, one of the two "fated lovers" from the classic wuxia novel The Return of the Condor Heroes.
- Yuen Wah as the Landlord of Pigsty Alley. He is a master of kung fu specializing in Tai Chi. He is flexible and able to hover in midair. The character is an allusion to Yang Guo, one of the two "fated lovers" from the classic wuxia novel The Return of the Condor Heroes.
- Leung Siu-lung as the Beast, an old but incredibly strong kung fu master. He is rumoured to be the most dangerous person alive, though his skill is disguised by his unkempt appearance. He is a master of the Toad Style from the Kwan Lun School. He can act as a toad including super-leaps and headbutt a person with immense force.
- Xing Yu as Coolie, a Kung Fu specialist of the Tan Tui Twelve Kicks technique from the Tam School. He has incredibly fast legs and can sense when an opponent is approaching.
- Chiu Chi-ling as the Tailor of Pigsty Alley. He specialises in the Hung Ga Iron Wire Fist technique and fights with iron rings on his arms.
- Dong Zhihua as Donut, a baker in Pigsty Alley. He specialises in the Eight Trigram Staff. He is a master of using staves and spears in battle.
- Lam Chi-chung as Bone, Sing's obese, clumsy sidekick who tends to follow Sing around.
- Huang Shengyi as Fong, Sing's mute love interest and childhood acquaintance. Sing saved her from bullies when she was young.
- Tin Kai-man as Brother Sum's adviser. He takes over as the head of the Axe Gang after Brother Sum is killed by Beast.
- Gar Hong-hay and Fung Hak-on as the Harpists, two assassins hired by the Axe Gang who kill their victims with a magical guzheng, or "Chinese harp".
- Lam Suet and Liang Hsiao as high-ranking members of the Axe Gang.
- Yuen Cheung-yan as the Beggar, the man who sold Sing the Buddha's Palm manual. He is a fraud who tricks kids to make money for himself. Yuen is the brother of Yuen Woo-ping, the film's fight choreographer.
- Feng Xiaogang as the leader of the Crocodile Gang. He is killed by the Axe Gang at the start of the film. He was the last gang leader to be killed by Brother Sum.

== Production ==
=== Development ===
An early sketch of the Pigsty Alley

Kung Fu Hustle was a co-production of the Beijing Film Studio and Hong Kong's Star Overseas. After the success of his 2001 film, Shaolin Soccer, Chow was approached in 2002 by Columbia Pictures Film Production Asia, offering to collaborate with him on a project. Chow accepted the offer, and the project eventually became Kung Fu Hustle. Columbia Pictures Film Production Asia’s involvement also connected the film to international production and distribution strategies for Chinese-language cinema. Kung Fu Hustle was produced with a budget of US$20 million. This partnership granted Chow unprecedented production scale while requiring adaptation to Hollywood's producer-driven system - Columbia executives insisted on extensive script development, with Chow noting the process was "very laborious" as he refined four successive drafts to meet studio standards. Klein argues that the film’s production brought together Hong Kong, mainland Chinese, and Hollywood film industries, making it an example of transnational Chinese-language cinema in the 2000s.

Chow was inspired to create the film by the martial arts films he watched as a child and by his childhood ambition to become a martial artist.

=== Setting ===
Chow's first priority was to design the main location of the film, "Pigsty Alley". Later in an interview Chow remarked that he had created the location from his childhood, basing the design on the crowded apartment complexes of Hong Kong where he had lived. The 1973 Shaw Brothers Studio film, The House of 72 Tenants, was another inspiration for Pigsty Alley. Designing the Alley began in January 2003 and took four months to complete. Many of the props and furniture in the apartments were antiques from all over China. Xiaoyu Chen argues that Pig Sty Alley functions as a cinematic space that connects Shanghai and Hong Kong through nostalgia, local memory, and the visual representation of a lower-class neighborhood.

=== Casting ===
Kung Fu Hustle features several prolific Hong Kong action cinema actors from the 1970s. Yuen Wah, a former student of the China Drama Academy Peking Opera School who appeared in over a hundred Hong Kong films and was a stunt double for Bruce Lee, played the Landlord of Pigsty Alley. Wah considered starring in Kung Fu Hustle to be the peak of his career. In spite of the film's success, he worried that nowadays fewer people practice martial arts.

Auditions for the role of the Landlady began in March 2003. Yuen Qiu, who did not audition, was spotted during her friend's screen test smoking a cigarette with a sarcastic expression on her face, which won her the part. Qiu, a student of Yu Jim-yuen, sifu of the China Drama Academy, had appeared in the 1974 James Bond film The Man with the Golden Gun at the age of 18. After a number of other small roles, she retired from films in the 1980s. Kung Fu Hustle was her first role in nineteen years. Qiu, in order to fulfill Chow's vision for the role, gained weight for the role by eating midnight snacks every day.

Bruce Leung, who played the Beast, was Stephen Chow's childhood martial arts hero. Leung Siu Lung was a famous action film director and actor in the 1970s and 1980s, known as the "Third Dragon" after Bruce Lee and Jackie Chan. After becoming unpopular in the Taiwanese film market in the late 1980s following a visit to China, he switched to a career in business. Kung Fu Hustle was his return to the film industry after a fifteen-year hiatus. He regarded Chow as a flexible director with high standards, and was particularly impressed by the first scene involving the Beast, which had to be reshot 28 times.

In addition to famous martial artists, Kung Fu Hustle features legends of Chinese cinema. Two famous Chinese directors appear in the film: Zhang Yibai, who plays Inspector Chan at the beginning of the film, and Feng Xiaogang, who plays the boss of the Crocodile Gang.

In casting Sing's love interest Fong, Chow stated that he wanted an innocent looking girl for the role. Television actress Eva Huang, in her film debut, was chosen from over 8,000 women. When asked about his decision in casting her, Chow said that he "just had a feeling about her" and that he enjoyed working with new actors. She chose to have no dialogue in the film so that she could stand out only with her body gestures.

=== Filming ===
CGI construction of the Buddhist Palm

Filming took place in Shanghai from June 2003 to November 2003. Two-thirds of the time was spent shooting the fight sequences. Those scenes were initially choreographed by Sammo Hung, who quit after two months due to illness, tough outdoor conditions, interest in another project and arguments with the production crew. Hung was replaced by Yuen Woo-ping, an action choreographer with experience ranging from 1960s Hong Kong action cinema to more recent films like Crouching Tiger, Hidden Dragon and The Matrix. Yuen promptly accepted the offer. Yuen drew on seemingly outdated wuxia fighting styles like the Deadly Melody and Buddhist Palm. He remarked that despite the comedic nature of the film, the shooting process was a serious matter due to the tight schedule.

Most of the special effects in the film, created by Hong Kong computer graphics company Centro Digital Pictures Limited, which had previously worked on films such as Shaolin Soccer and Kill Bill, included a combination of computer-generated imagery and wire work. Centro Digital performed extensive tests on CGI scenes before filming started, and treatment of the preliminary shots began immediately afterwards. The CGI crew edited out wire effects and applied special effects in high resolution. Legendary martial arts mentioned in wuxia novels were depicted and exaggerated through CGI, but actual people were used for the final fight between Chow's character and hundreds of axe-wielding gangsters. After a final calibration of colour, data of the processed scenes was sent to the US for the production of the final version. A group of six people followed the production crew throughout the shooting.

=== Music ===
The majority of the film's original score was composed by Raymond Wong and performed by the Hong Kong Chinese Orchestra. The score imitates traditional Chinese music used in 1940s swordplay films. One of Wong's works, Nothing Ventured, Nothing Gained, provides a stark contrast between the villainous Axe Gang and the peaceful neighbourhood of Pigsty Alley, depicted by a Chinese folk song, Fisherman's Song of the East China Sea. Along with Wong's compositions and various traditional Chinese songs, classical compositions are featured in the score, including excerpts from Zigeunerweisen by Pablo de Sarasate and Sabre Dance by Aram Khachaturian. The song, Zhiyao Weini Huo Yitian (只要為你活一天; Only Want to Live One Day for You), is sung in the background by Eva Huang at the end of the film. Written by Liu Chia-chang in the 1970s, it tells of a girl's memories of a loved one, and her desire to live for him again. Kung Fu Hustle was nominated for Best Original Film Score at the 24th Hong Kong Film Awards.

Asian and American versions of the soundtrack were released. The Asian version of the soundtrack was released on 17 December 2004 by Sony Music Entertainment and has 33 tracks. The American version of the soundtrack was released on 29 March 2005 by Varèse Sarabande and has 19 tracks, with 14 tracks missing compared to the Asian release.

The soundtrack for the trailer was mastered at Epiphany Music and Recording, Inc. in Santa Rosa, California.

== Style and Theme ==
Kung Fu Hustle combines kung fu action, slapstick comedy, digital effects, and exaggerated physical performance. Raechel Dumas argues that the film transforms kung fu into a globally consumable spectacle, using martial arts not only as action choreography but also as comedy and fantasy. S. V. Srinivas connects the film to a familiar Stephen Chow pattern in which the protagonist moves from incompetence and masquerade toward a spectacular transformation into a kung fu hero.

Christina Klein argues that Kung Fu Hustle combines nostalgia for Hong Kong cinema with transnational production strategies. Through the casting of veteran performers, references to classic wuxia traditions, and the reconstruction of cinematic spaces such as Pig Sty Alley, the film evokes memories of postwar Hong Kong popular culture. Klein suggests that these nostalgic elements allow local cultural memories to circulate globally, enabling international audiences to engage with the history and traditions of Hong Kong martial arts cinema.

Since martial arts cinema is the representative of Hongkongers’ “identification and communicate themselves to the world”, Yang indicates that the film reworks traditional wuxia conventions through “merging of martial arts convention and Western influences, recalls the local cinematic tradition”. For example, the setting combines concepts of “anonymous masters” with “immigrants in the neighbourhood” that struggles for “seeking shelter in a rundown tenement”. The purchase of the secret manual 'Buddha's Palm' deconstructs the “strict decorum” of the traditional “winding process of disciples getting the master's approval and ancestral knowledge”, whereas the plot of “ordinary people gaining extraordinary power” is a sarcasm towards the “capitalist exchange and individual pursuit visualizes the growth of civil society.”

== References to other works ==
Kung Fu Hustle makes references to a wide range of films, animated cartoons, wuxia novels, anime and other sources.

The Crocodile Gang leader says, "No one shows in the movie theater on Sunday. I will rather do any business than the movie business", before he was ambushed by the Axe Gang. In reality, the Crocodile Gang leader is played by Feng Xiaogang, a well-known movie director in China.

The housing arrangement of the Pigsty Alley is similar to that of a 1973 Hong Kong film, The House of 72 Tenants. A possible real world reference for Pigsty Alley is "Kowloon Walled City" in Hong Kong, a former slum in central Hong Kong.

There are two references to Chow's previous hit film, Shaolin Soccer: When Sing arrives at Pigsty Alley, he plays skilfully with a soccer ball, then says, "You're still playing football?". The second reference is the scene in which a clerk beats Sing up on a bus. The clerk also appeared in Shaolin Soccer as the leader of an opposing team who used hidden weapons to beat up the Shaolin soccer team.

When Sing challenges a boy in the Pigsty Alley, Sing calls him "The Karate Kid", a reference to the 1984 film of the same name. During the altercation between Sing and the hairdresser, the hairdresser states, "Even if you kill me, there will be thousands more of me!". This is a reference to a famous quote made by Lu Haodong, a Chinese revolutionary in the late Qing dynasty.

The scene in which Sing is chased by the Landlady as he flees from the Alley is a homage to Wile E. Coyote and the Road Runner, characters in the Looney Tunes cartoons, even including the pursuer's (the Landlady's) ill fate. During the opening scene in which the leader of the Crocodile Gang is killed by Brother Sum of the Axe Gang, in the background a poster for the 1939 film Le Jour Se Lève is visible. In the scene in which Sing robs the ice cream vendor, a poster for the 1935 film Top Hat is in the background. As Sing arrives at the door to the Beast's cell in the mental asylum, he hallucinates a large wave of blood rushing from the cell door, similar to a scene in The Shining. The Landlady says at one point, "Tomorrow is another day", which is a line from the 1936 novel Gone with the Wind and its 1939 film adaptation.

A major element of the plot is based on the Famous wuxia film series Palm of Ru Lai (如來神掌), released in 1964. Sing studied the fighting style used in Palm of Ru Lai ("Buddhist Palm style"), from a young age and used it at the end of Kung Fu Hustle. In reality, the Buddhist Palm fighting style does not leave palm-shaped craters and holes on impact. Instead, the user delivers powerful punches using his palm. The Beast's name in Chinese, Huoyun Xieshen (火雲邪神; Evil Deity of the Fiery Cloud), and the fight with the Landlady and her husband are also references to the Palm of Ru Lai, in which a mortally wounded master strikes the patterns of his art's final techniques into a bell so that his apprentice can learn from it. Kung Fu Hustle also contains direct references to characters from Louis Cha's wuxia novels. For example, the landlord and landlady refer to themselves as Yang Guo and Xiaolongnü, the names of characters in Cha's The Return of the Condor Heroes, when they met the Beast.

An aerial shot of Sing fighting the Axe Gang. The fight is reminiscent of The Matrix Reloaded.

References to gangster films are also present. The boss of the Axe Gang, Brother Sum (琛哥) is named after Hon Sam / Hon Sum (韓琛), the triad boss played by Eric Tsang in Infernal Affairs. The Harpists imitate The Blues Brothers, wearing similar hats and sunglasses at all times. When they are flattered by the Axe Gang advisor, one of them answers, "Strictly speaking we're just musicians", similar to a line by Elwood Blues.

When Donut dies, he says, "In great power lies great responsibility", a reference to 2002's Spider-Man, said by Uncle Ben before his death. Additionally, in that scene, the Landlady says, "Like Donut said, everyone has his reasons", a reference to Jean Renoir's 1939 film The Rules of the Game. Afterwards, with his dying breath, Donut gets up, grabs the Landlord by the shirt and utters in English, "What are you prepared to do?", a nod to Sean Connery's character Jim Malone in Brian De Palma's 1987 film The Untouchables.

The dialogue that the Beast says while negotiating with the Axe Gang for killing the Landlady and Landlord—"... then young friend, I will make an offer you cannot refuse" it is a reference of the dialogue from the movie of 1972s The Godfather. Also, the Landlady's comment to Brother Sum—"We brought a gift you cannot refuse" is an obvious parody of the same, to which Sum replies (in the dubbed version of the film), "Ha! With the Beast on our side, we shall see for whom the bell tolls", a reference to the titular 1943 film.

The final fight between Sing (who has been reborn into "the one", which pays homage to Bruce Lee by wearing his costume in Enter the Dragon and using his fighting style) and the hundreds of gangsters imitates the fight between Neo and hundreds of Agent Smiths in The Matrix Reloaded. The scene in which the Beast prompts an Axe member to punch him harder is reminiscent of a similar scene in Raging Bull, with Robert De Niro's character prompting Joe Pesci's character.

The last scene, in which the beggar tries to sell martial arts manuals, refers directly to the greatest skills in Louis Cha's Condor Trilogy (Nine Yang Manual, "Yiyang Finger", and "Eighteen Subduing Dragon Palms"), "Thousand Hand Divine Fist", and The Smiling, Proud Wanderer ("Nine Swords of Dugu"). The scene in which the landlady confronts Brother Sum in the back of his car is a homage to Bruce Lee in this from the movie of 1972s Way of the Dragon, where she cracks her knuckles and gives a quick upper nod to the mafia boss, telling him to back off.

According to Raechel Dumas, Kung Fu Hustle transforms traditional martial arts cinema into a globally consumable spectacle through parody, fantasy, and visual excess. The film incorporates recognizable conventions from wuxia fiction and Hong Kong kung fu films—including legendary masters, secret martial arts manuals, and supernatural fighting techniques—while simultaneously exaggerating and reinterpreting them through Stephen Chow’s comic style. As a result, these references function as both homage to and parody of martial arts traditions.

== Releases ==
Kung Fu Hustle premiered at the 2004 Toronto International Film Festival. It was later released across East Asia including China, Hong Kong and Malaysia in December 2004. The film was first shown in the US at the Sundance Film Festival in January 2005, and then opened in a general release on 22 April 2005 after being shown in Los Angeles and New York for two weeks.

The North American DVD release was on 8 August 2005. A Blu-ray version of the DVD was released on 12 December 2006 by Sony Pictures. A UMD version of the film was released for the PlayStation Portable. The United States DVD releases were censored, cutting a number of scenes that featured lots of gore or human excrement. A later release, called "The Kick-Axe Edition", restored these scenes.

In the United Kingdom the standard DVD was released 24 October 2005, the same day a special edition was released with collector's items, which included playing cards, a keyring, a sweat band, and an inflatable axe. On 8 April 2007, Sony Pictures Home Entertainment released a Blu-ray version.

The Portuguese title of the film is Kungfusão, which sounds like Kung Fu and Confusão (confusion). In the same way as Kungfusão, the Italian and Spanish titles were Kung-fusion and Kung-fusión, puns of "confusion". In France, the film is known as Crazy Kung Fu, and the Hungarian title is A Pofonok Földje, meaning The Land of Punches.

In Korea a Limited Collector's Edition DVD was released which included a leather wallet, Stephen Chow's Palm Figure with his signature, a photo album and Special Kung Fu's Booklet with a certificate of authenticity.

In November 2026, it was announced that The Criterion Collection will be releasing Kung Fu Hustle on both Blu-ray and Ultra HD Blu-ray on 9 February 2027. The discs will feature a restoration of the director's cut of the film in 4K resolution.

== Reception ==
On the review aggregator website Rotten Tomatoes, 91% of 190 critics' reviews are positive, with an average rating of 7.7/10. The website's consensus reads: "Kung Fu Hustle blends special effects, martial arts, and the Looney Toons to hilarious effect."" Metacritic, which uses a weighted average, assigned the film a score of 78 out of 100, based on 38 critics, indicating "generally favorable" reviews.

Hong Kong director and film critic Gabriel Wong praised the film for its black comedy, special effects and nostalgia, citing the return of many retired kung fu actors from the 1970s. Film critic Roger Ebert's description of the film ("like Jackie Chan and Buster Keaton meet Quentin Tarantino and Bugs Bunny") was printed on the promotion posters for the film in the US. Other critics described it as a comedic version of Crouching Tiger, Hidden Dragon. Positive reviews generally gave credit to the elements of mo lei tau comedy present in the film. A number of reviewers viewed it as a computer-enhanced Looney Tunes punch-up. In a 2010 interview, actor Bill Murray called Kung Fu Hustle "the supreme achievement of the modern age in terms of comedy". In 2021, American filmmaker James Gunn called it "the greatest film ever made".

Beyond the popular reception, the film is also studied and interpreted in multiple academic aspects. Gary Xu considered it “a study in modernization, exploitation, and redemption”, containing an “indirect, subversive strategy of martial arts”, and metaphorically criticizes “urban demolishment, tenant intimidation, and government corruption.” Complementing this, Szeto argues that the film utilizes “Hollywood’s globalization” to recreate and integrate “an imaginative spirit and revitalizes the story elements of wuxia culture”, under Hong Kong's political transformation in historical context.

Much of the criticism for the film was directed at its lack of character development and a coherent plot. Las Vegas Weekly, for instance, criticised the film for not having enough of a central protagonist and character depth. Criticism was also directed towards the film's cartoonish and childish humour. However, it was considered reasonable, as the Kung Fu Hustle production team chose to make the film's characters largely one-dimensional. The movie, "in its attempt to appeal to a transnational audience, affirms distinctly Western notions of Chinese that many earlier Kung Fu films set out to subvert." The Kung Fu Hustle team attempt to appeal to a more progressive generation throughout the history of Chinese cinema. In a Penn State study of Kung Fu Hustle, the researcher argued that the narrative of the film adheres to traditional kung fu film tropes while subverting their philosophical underpinnings. Earlier in the kung fu film industry, it usually involved complex characters, and also tried to explore and expose constructs ranging from gender to race as well as to nation. One-dimension is the key feature of Kung Fu Hustle, as it is rooted in a filmic genre that connected with Hong Kong identity, but also represented the Western imagination of China's past and Kung Fu heroism.

Kung Fu Hustle was critically acclaimed for its innovative blend of comedy, martial arts, and cultural references, particularly its evocation of a distinctly Hong Kong cinematic identity. The film's reverent parody of martial arts tropes and melodramatic themes, such as the lost-and-found son, further solidified its status as a cultural touchstone, resonating with viewers familiar with Hong Kong cinema's legacy.

Kung Fu Hustle earned widespread praise for its mix of slapstick comedy, martial arts action, and deep ties to Hong Kong's cinematic heritage. Sing's journey, from a bumbling gangster to a kung fu master, is punctuated by iconic moments like the Beijing Opera-infused battles, which pay homage to Hong Kong's action legacy while poking fun at its tropes.

=== Box office ===
Kung Fu Hustle opened in Hong Kong on 23 December 2004, and earned HK$4,990,000 on its opening day. It stayed at the top of the box office for the rest of 2004 and for much of early 2005, eventually grossing HK$61.27 million. Its box office tally made it the highest-grossing film in Hong Kong history, until it was beaten by You Are the Apple of My Eye in 2011.

Sony Pictures Classics opened Kung Fu Hustle in limited theatrical release in New York City and Los Angeles on 8 April 2005 before being widely released across North America on 22 April. In its first week of limited release in seven cinemas, it grossed US$269,225 (US$38,461 per screen). When it was expanded to a wide release in 2,503 cinemas, the largest number of cinemas ever for a foreign language film, it made a modest US$6,749,572 (US$2,696 per screen), eventually grossing a total of US$17,108,591 in 129 days. In total, Kung Fu Hustle had a worldwide gross of US$101,104,669. While not a blockbuster, Kung Fu Hustle managed to become the highest-grossing foreign-language film in North America in 2005 and went on to generate more than US$30,000,000 in the United States home video market.

=== Accolades ===
The film was nominated for sixteen Hong Kong Film Awards, out of which winning Best Picture, Best Action Choreography, Best Film Editing, Best Sound Effects, Best Supporting Actor and Best Visual Effects. Five more awards were later picked up at the Golden Horse Awards including an award for Best Director for Stephen Chow. In the United States Kung Fu Hustle was well received by various film critic associations, nominated as Best Foreign Language Film in Golden Globe Award, and winning Best Foreign Language Film from Boston, Chicago, Las Vegas and Phoenix-based critics. it was later nominated for six Satellite Awards and one MTV Movie Award for best fight scene. In the United Kingdom at 59th British Academy Film Awards the film was nominated for a BAFTA.

In 2011, the Taipei Golden Horse Film Festival listed Kung Fu Hustle at number 48 in their list of "100 Greatest Chinese-Language Films". The majority of the voters originated from Taiwan, and included film scholars, festival programmers, film directors, actors and producers. In 2014, Time Out polled several film critics, directors, actors and stunt actors to list their top action films. Kung Fu Hustle was listed at 50th place on this list.

Award / Film Festival	Category	Recipient(s)	Result
Amsterdam Fantastic Film Festival		Stephen Chow	Won
BAFTA Awards	Best Film not in the English Language	Stephen Chow; Bo-Chu Chui; Jeffrey Lau	Nominated
Boston Society of Film Critics Awards	Best Foreign Language Film		Won
Broadcast Film Critics Association Awards	Best Foreign-Language Film		Won
Chicago Film Critics Association Awards	Best Foreign Language Film		Nominated
Florida Film Critics Circle Awards	Best Foreign Film		Won
Golden Globe Award (USA)	Best Foreign Language Film		Nominated
Golden Horse Awards	Best Director	Stephen Chow	Won
Golden Horse Awards	Best Film		Won
Golden Horse Awards	Best Make Up & Costume Design	Shirley Chan	Won
Golden Horse Awards	Best Supporting Actress	Qiu Yuen	Won
Golden Horse Awards	Best Visual Effect	Frankie Chung; Don Ma Tam; Kai Kwan; Hung Franco	Won
Golden Horse Awards	Best Action Choreography	Woo-ping Yuen	Nominated
Golden Horse Awards	Best Art Direction	Oliver Wong	Nominated
Golden Horse Awards	Best Editing	Angie Lam	Nominated
Golden Horse Awards	Best Sound Effects	Steve Burgess; Steven Ticknor; Robert Mackenzie; Paul Pirola	Nominated
Golden Horse Awards	Best Supporting Actor	Wah Yuen	Nominated
Golden Trailer Awards	Best Foreign	(Winston Davis & Associates).	Nominated
Hong Kong Film Awards	Best Action Choreography	Woo-ping Yuen	Won
Hong Kong Film Awards	Best Film Editing	Angie Lam	Won
Hong Kong Film Awards	Best Picture		Won
Hong Kong Film Awards	Best Sound Effects	Steven; Ticknor; Steve Burgess; Robert Mackenzie; Paul Pirola	Won
Hong Kong Film Awards	Best Supporting Actor	Wah Yuen	Won
Hong Kong Film Awards	Best Visual Effects	Frankie Chung Ma; Wing-On Tam; Kai-Kwun Hung; Lau-Leung	Won
Hong Kong Film Awards	Best Actor	Stephen Chow	Nominated
Hong Kong Film Awards	Best Actress	Qiu Yuen	Nominated
Hong Kong Film Awards	Best Art Direction	Oliver Wong	Nominated
Hong Kong Film Awards	Best Cinematography	Hang-Sang Poon	Nominated
Hong Kong Film Awards	Best Costume Design and Make Up	Shirley Chan	Nominated
Hong Kong Film Awards	Best Director	Stephen Chow	Nominated
Hong Kong Film Awards	Best New Artist	Shengyi Huang	Nominated
Hong Kong Film Awards	Best Original Film Score	Ying-Wah Wong	Nominated
Hong Kong Film Awards	Best Screenplay	Stephen Chow; Kan-Cheung Tsang; KXin Huo; KMan Keung Chan	Nominated
Hong Kong Film Awards	Best Supporting Actor	Kwok-Kwan Chan	Nominated
Hong Kong Film Critics Society Awards	Film of Merit		Won
Hundred Flowers Awards	Best Supporting Actress	Qiu Yuen	Won
Hundred Flowers Awards	Best Actor	Stephen Chow	Nominated
Hundred Flowers Awards	Best Director	Stephen Chow	Nominated
Hundred Flowers Awards	Best Film		Nominated
Hundred Flowers Awards	Best Newcomer	Shengyi Huang	Nominated
Hundred Flowers Awards	Best Supporting Actor	Wah Yuen	Nominated
Las Vegas Film Critics Society Awards	Best Foreign Film		Won
MTV Movie Awards	Best Fight	Stephen Chow vs. The Axe Gang	Nominated
Motion Picture Sound Editors (USA)	Best Sound Editing in Feature Film – Foreign	Steve Burgess (supervising sound editor) Chris Goodes (sound editor); Vic Kaspar (sound editor); Jo Mion (sound editor); Andrew Neil (sound editor); Paul Pirola (sound design); Steven Ticknor (sound design); Mario Vaccaro (foley artist)	Nominated
Online Film Critics Society Awards	Best Foreign Language Film		Nominated
Phoenix Film Critics Society Awards	Best Foreign Language Film	Stephen Chow	Won
Satellite Awards	Outstanding Actress in a Supporting Role, Comedy or Musical	Qiu Yuen	Nominated
Satellite Awards	Outstanding Cinematography	Hang-Sang Poon	Nominated
Satellite Awards	Outstanding Film Editing	Angie Lam	Nominated
Satellite Awards	Outstanding Motion Picture, Comedy or Musical		Nominated
Satellite Awards	Outstanding Sound (Mixing & Editing)	Paul Pirola	Nominated
Satellite Awards	Outstanding Visual Effects	Frankie Chung	Nominated
Shanghai Film Critics Awards	Top 10 Films		Won
Southeastern Film Critics Association Awards	Best Foreign Language Film China/Hong Kong.		Nominated (Runner-up)

== Potential sequel ==
In 2005, Chow announced that there would be a sequel to Kung Fu Hustle, although he had not settled on a female lead. "There will be a lot of new characters in the movie. We'll need a lot of new actors. It's possible that we'll look for people abroad besides casting locals". In January 2013, during an interview, Chow admitted that plans for making Kung Fu Hustle 2 have been put on hold. "I was indeed in the midst of making the movie, but it is currently put on hold in view of other incoming projects". Production of Kung Fu Hustle 2 was delayed while Chow filmed the science fiction adventure film CJ7. As a result, Kung Fu Hustle 2 was slated for a 2014 release. By 2017, Chow had already completed The Mermaid and Journey to the West: The Demons Strike Back. Due to his focus on behind-the-scenes production and the fact that he has not made an appearance since CJ7, it was suspected that he had stopped acting. However, Chow clarified that he still wants to act, but has not found a role suited for him. Kung Fu Hustle 2 remains incomplete. In February 2019, during a promo interview for The New King of Comedy, Stephen confirmed that the sequel is in the works. He will direct the movie and possibly cameo in the film, but the story will not be a direct sequel to the first one. Chow explains the sequel will be a spiritual successor to the first one, but set in modern times.

== Video games ==
=== Online and mobile games ===
In 2004 a promotional flash game was released by Sony Pictures Entertainment on their Japanese website. The game was created by Japanese game developer Point Zero and plays as a point-and-click beat 'em up. A side-scrolling game designed for mobile phones was later released in 2006 by developer Tracebit.

=== MMO ===
In 2007 Sony Online Entertainment announced that a massively multiplayer online 2D side-scrolling fighter game based on the film was under development for the Chinese market. Two years later a preview of the game was featured at E3 where it received mixed reviews from critics with many comparing it to similar MMO games such as Guild Wars and Phantasy Star Online.

A North American release for PC and PS3 was planned for late 2009, but never came to fruition. The game was only available in Asia for the PC.

== See also ==
- Chandni Chowk to China — A 2009 Bollywood film inspired by Kung Fu Hustle.
- Cinema of China
- Cinema of Hong Kong
- Everything Everywhere All at Once — A 2022 Hollywood film inspired by Kung Fu Hustle.
- Kung Fu Panda (film) — A 2008 Hollywood film inspired by Kung Fu Hustle.
- List of films featuring the deaf and hard of hearing
- Yuen Wah filmography
