= Meng Xiaodong =

Chinese Peking opera actress

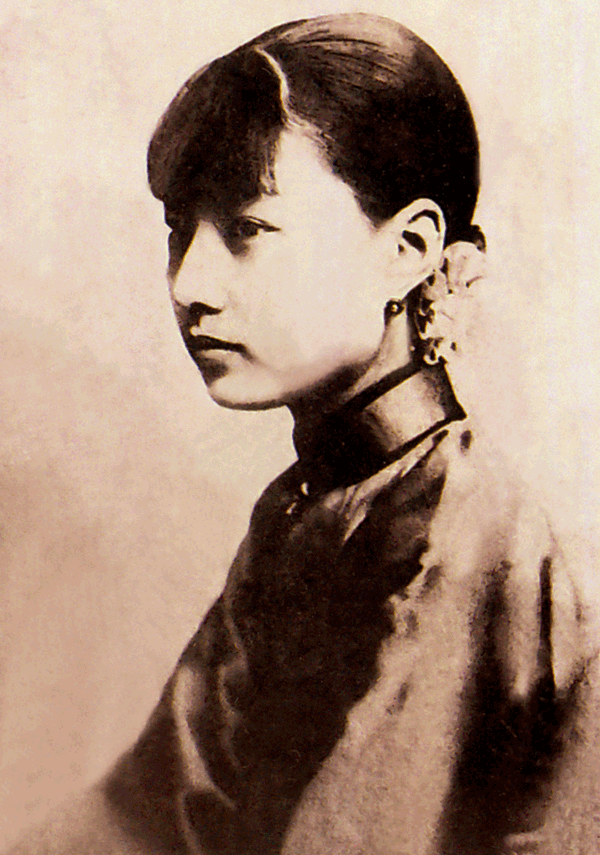
- Born: December 9, 1908; Shanghai County, China
- Died: May 26, 1977 (aged 68); Taipei, Taiwan
- Resting place: Shulin District, New Taipei City, Taiwan
- Occupation: Peking opera performer
- Known for: Old sheng roles
- Style: Yu (Yu Shuyan) school
- Spouses: Mei Lanfang (m. 1927; div. 1933) Du Yuesheng (m. 1950; div. 1951)

Chinese name
- Chinese: 孟小冬
Transcriptions
Standard Mandarin
- Hanyu Pinyin: Mèng Xiǎodōng

Meng Xiaodong (Chinese: 孟小冬; pinyin: Mèng xiǎodōng) (December 9, 1908 – May 26, 1977) was a Chinese actress of Peking opera who specialized in old sheng (male) roles.

== Life ==
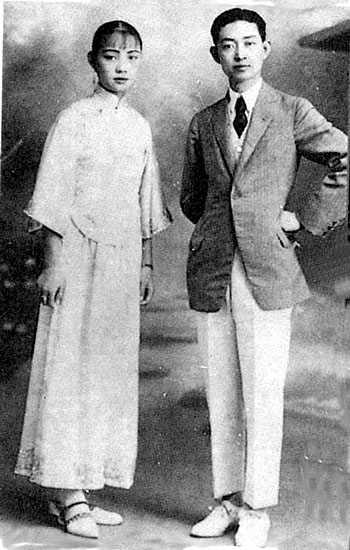
Meng Xiaodong and Mei Lanfang

In August 1925, Meng met Mei Lanfang and they co-starred in the film Yóu lóng xī fèng (游龙戏凤). In 1927 Meng married Mei Lanfang as his concubine. At that time, Mei Lanfang already had two wives, official wife Wang Minghua and concubine Fu Zhifang.

In August 1930, Mei's aunt died. The Mei family did not recognize the marriage between Meng and Mei and refused to allow Meng to wear mourning clothes as their daughter-in-law. The two then broke up but reunited soon after. However, in mid-1931, they officially broke up. Under the mediation of Meng's lawyer, Zheng Yuxiu, and Du Yuesheng, Mei paid Meng 40,000 yuan in alimony. Two years later, in 1933, Meng announced that she had ended relations with Mei and his family on Ta Kung Pao.

In the spring of 1949, Meng moved to British Hong Kong with Du Yuesheng and his family. 1950, when Du already had several wives, she married him in Hong Kong to become his concubine. Following the marriage, she completely withdrew from the stage.

In August 1951, Du died. After the death of her husband, Meng remained in Hong Kong, and Du's fourth wife, Yao Yulan, and his children moved to Taiwan. However, when the Cultural Revolution broke out in 1966, she immigrated to Taiwan the following year. She lived in Taipei, with Yao Yulan and her second daughter Du Meixia, until her death.

On May 26, 1977, Meng died in Taipei at the age of 68. She was interred in Shulin District, New Taipei City. Du Meixia, who died in 2018, was buried at the same tombstone. Du Meixia and Meng were like mother and daughter, and Du Meixia served as chairman of Meng Xiaodong National Theatre Scholarship Foundation. The Foundation has been granting scholarships to promising Peking opera talents in Taiwan since 1978.

== In popular culture ==
=== Movies ===
- Lord of East China Sea (1993) by Cecilia Yip
- Lord of East China Sea II (1993) by Cecilia Yip
- Forever Enthralled (2008) by Zhang Ziyi
- The Last Tycoon (2012) by Feng Wenjuan (as child) and Yuan Quan (as adult)

=== TV series ===
- Shanghai, Shanghai (2010) by Yang Zimo
- Lord Of Shanghai (2015) by Myolie Wu

== Gallery ==
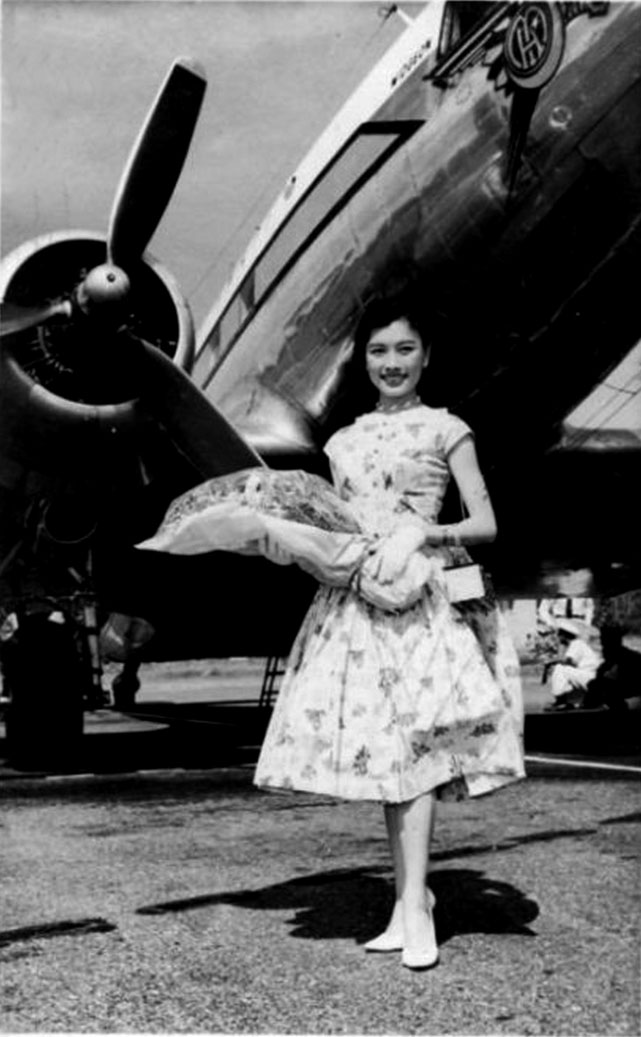
Meng Xiaodong in 1920

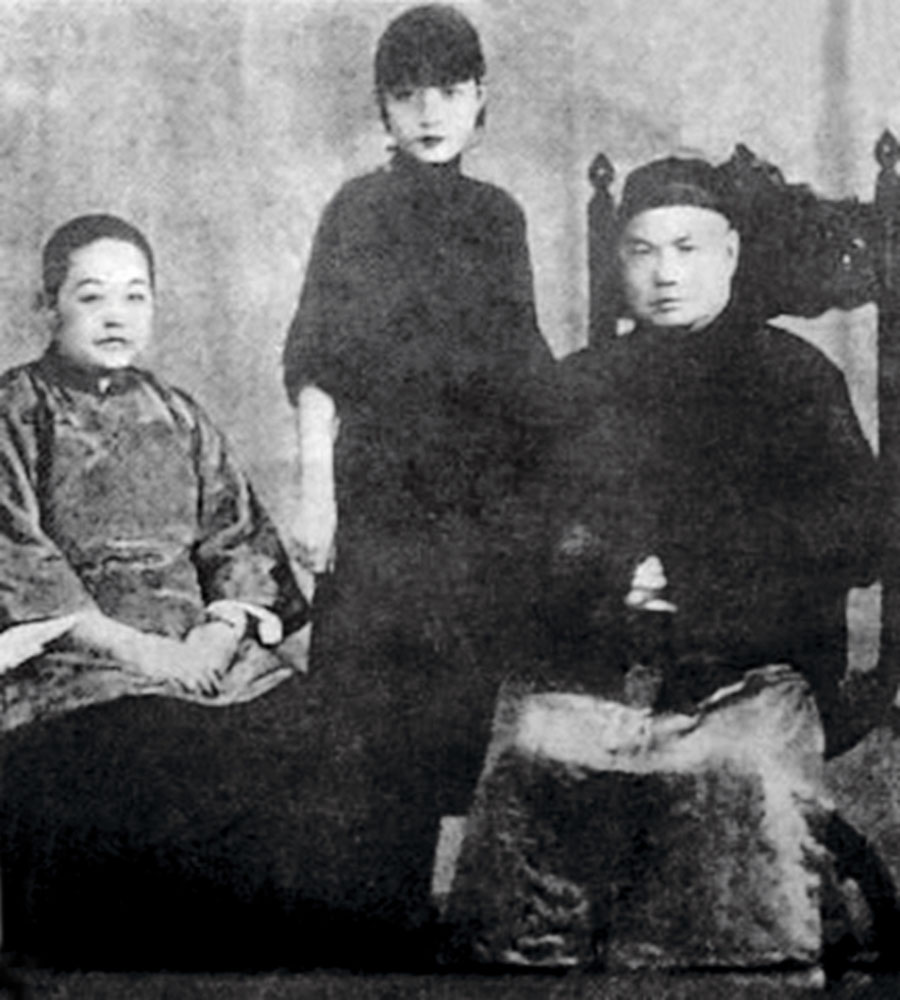
Meng Xiaodong acting with her parents

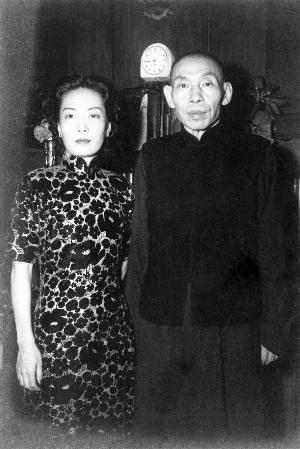
Meng Xiaodong and Du Yuesheng marriage photo

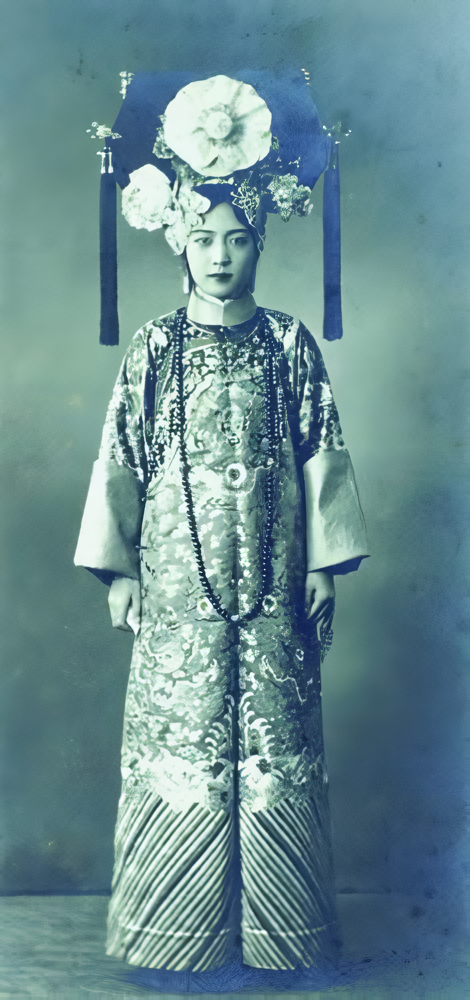
Meng Xiadong in Manchu dress
