= Ying Guixin =

Chinese military and underworld figure

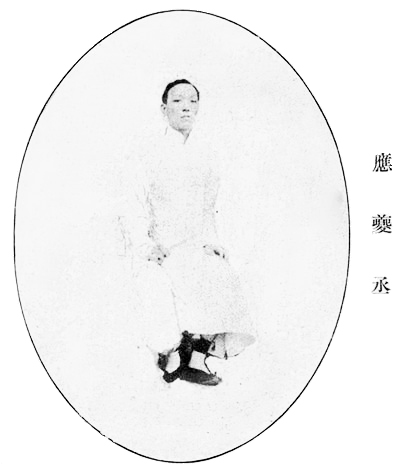
Ying Guixin

Ying Guixin (Traditional Chinese: 應桂馨; simplified Chinese: 应桂馨; 1864 – January 1914), also known as Ying Kuicheng, was a military and underworld figure in the waning days of the Qing dynasty and the early Republic of China (1912–49). He was a leader in the Shanghai Green Gang, Chief of Intelligence under the political leader Chen Qimei's provisional Shanghai Military Government, Chief Inspector of Jiangsu Province, and later Commander of Sun Yat-sen's Presidential Guard. He was also closely associated with Yuan Shikai's government. Ying Guixin was directly involved in the assassination of Song Jiaoren who had been deemed a threat by various political factions loyal to Yuan Shikai.

He was born in Ningbo into a family whose fortune derived from stoneworks and land. This enabled him to be well-educated to the point that he even knew English. Unable to take the Imperial examinations when they were abolished in 1905 he moved to Shanghai and became wealthy in his own right through large real estate holdings. It was probably around this time he became involved with the Green Gang, a fraternal organization that promoted both political and criminal enterprises. The Green Gang were also early supporters of Chiang Kai-shek and many other powerful political figures; indeed, the gang functioned as a kind of secret society and was often employed as enforcers by politicians keen to stabilize rivalries. Ying Guixin had long harbored political tendencies and his 30-room villa in Shanghai's French Concession became a hub for political discussions and a refuge for political thinkers such as Yu Youren and Chen Qimei.

While with the Green Gang he became acquainted with Yuan Shikai's second son Yuan Kewen with whom he shared an appreciation of antiques.

After Chen Qimei's provisional government was overturned by Yuan Shikai, Ying Guixin switched loyalties. In 1913 Ying Guixin was contracted by Yuan Shikai's government to assassinate Song Jiaoren who had become a threat to not only Yuan Shikai but also a rival of both Sun Yat-Sen and Liang Qichao. He subcontracted this out to an ex-soldier named Wu Shiying who on March 20, 1913 approached Song Jiaoren at a Shanghai railway station and shot him with a Browning pistol; Song Jiaoren died two days later in the hospital.

Due to the outcry, Ying Guixin and others who were believed to be involved were rounded up and arrested. Incriminating telegrams were found at his house and he was detained but managed to escape to Beijing in order to secure protection from Yuan Shikai. Indeed, all those suspected to be involved died mysteriously in order to deflect any responsibility from Yuan Shikai including the Premier of the Republic of China Zhao Bingjun, who was found poisoned. Ying Guixin was killed by two swordsmen in a first-class train compartment en route to Tianjin.
