= Chinese Air Force Flight 222 =

1946 aviation accident in China

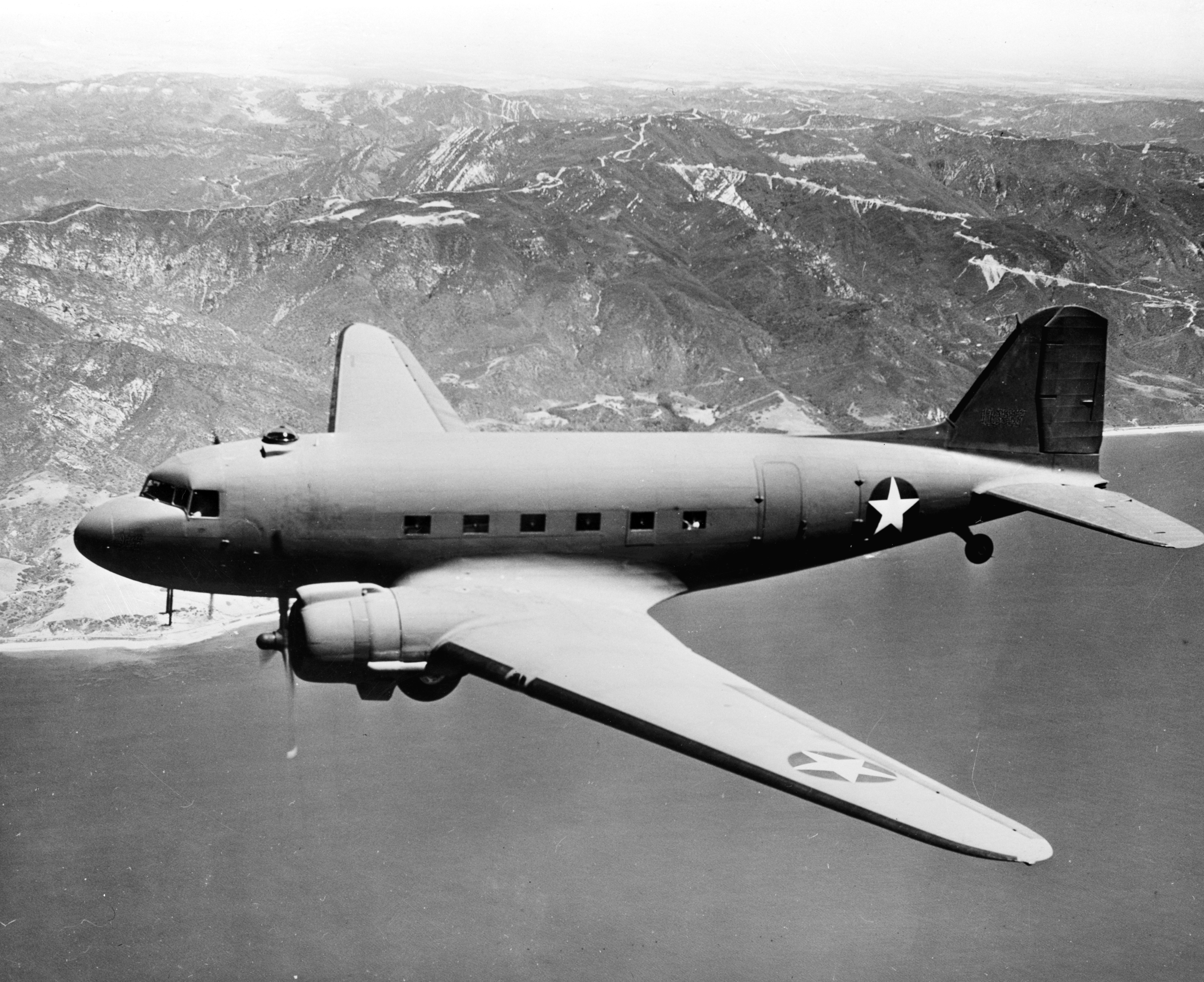
- A C-47 similar to the accident aircraft

Accident
- Date: 17 March 1946
- Summary: Controlled flight into terrain (mountain)
- Site: Nanjing, Republic of China

Aircraft
- Aircraft type: C-47 Skytrain
- Operator: Republic of China Air Force
- Flight origin: Beiping
- Stopover: Tianjin
- Last stopover: Qingdao Cangkou Airport
- Destination: Shanghai
- Passengers: 9 (disputed)
- Crew: 4 (disputed)
- Fatalities: 13–20 (all)
- Survivors: 0

Chinese Air Force Flight 222 was an aviation accident that occurred on 17 March 1946, when a Republic of China Air Force C-47 crashed into Mount Dai near Nanjing, killing all 20 people on board, including intelligence chief Dai Li.

Speculation has surrounded the cause of the crash, including theories that it was arranged either by Chinese Communist Party intelligence chief Kang Sheng of the Central Social Affairs Department or by the American Office of Strategic Services.

== Aircraft ==
The aircraft involved was a Douglas C-47 Skytrain operated by the Republic of China Air Force. The aircraft was part of a special transport flight designated "Flight 222". Specific details such as the aircraft's registration, manufacturing date, and total flight hours are not well documented in available sources.

== Accident ==
On 17 March 1946, the aircraft departed from Beiping, with a scheduled stopover in Tianjin and a final stop at Qingdao Cangkou Airport, en route to Shanghai. After departing Qingdao, the aircraft approached the Nanjing area. During the flight, it crashed into Mount Dai near Nanjing in what is believed to have been a controlled flight into terrain accident. According to contemporary records and an eyewitness, the aircraft clipped trees before slamming into a ridge.

Weather conditions and navigational factors are believed to have contributed to the crash. All passengers and crew on board were killed in the crash.

== Crew and passengers ==
The exact number of occupants remains disputed, with some sources reporting 13 people on board, while others state that as many as 20 were killed.

The crew consisted of Captain Feng Junzhong, Republic of China Air Force 103rd Squadron deputy commander; First Officer Zhang Yuanren; Second Officer Xiong Chong and Flight engineer Li Kaici.

Among the victims was Dai Li, the head of the Bureau of Investigation and Statistics. The other eight passengers onboard were also personnel were: Gong Xianfang (Secretary and personnel director of the bureau); Jin Yubo (intelligence officer); Xu Yan (aide-de-camp); Ma Peiheng (English interpreter); Li Qi (communications officer and code clerk); He Qiyi (bodyguard); Cao Jihua (bodyguard); Huang Shunbai (former interpreter for Iwane Matsui).

== Investigations ==
It is reported that Dai Li had invited interpreter Li Fuji to accompany him south from Qingdao, but Li declined due to other obligations, thereby avoiding the crash. Years later, Li provided what is claimed to be the only known photograph of the aircraft involved.

Speculation has surrounded the cause of the crash. Some theories suggest it may have been arranged by the Chinese Communist Party's intelligence chief Kang Sheng of the Central Social Affairs Department. Other rumors claim involvement by the American Office of Strategic Services (OSS), allegedly due to Dai's anti-American stance, as the aircraft was American-made. There are readings stating that all the people escaped unhurt.
