= Dai Li =

Chinese general and spymaster (1897–1946)

Dai Li 戴笠
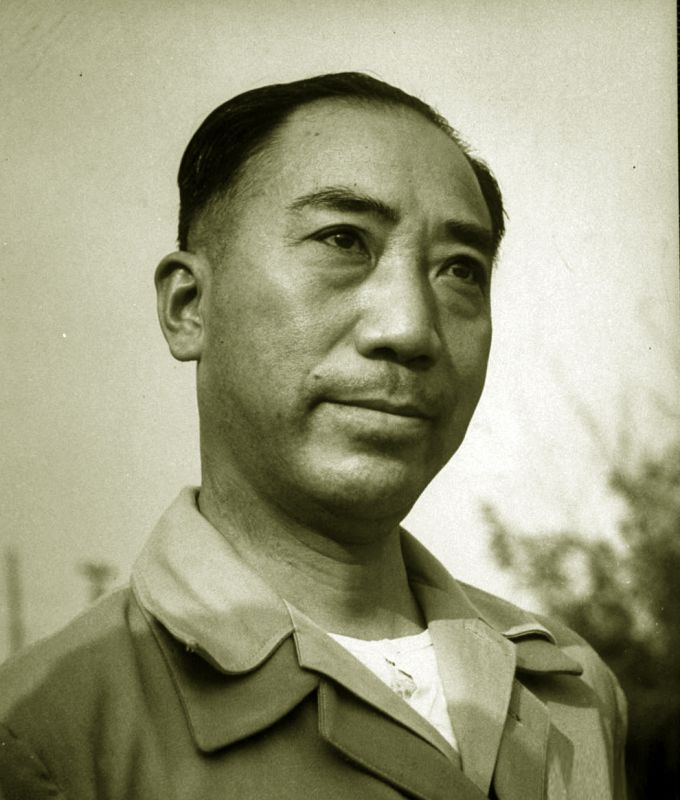

Director of the Bureau of Investigation and Statistics
- In office 1928 – 17 March 1946
- President: Chiang Kai-shek
- Preceded by: Position established
- Succeeded by: Mao Renfeng

Personal details
- Born: 28 May 1897 Jiangshan, Zhejiang, Qing dynasty China
- Died: 17 March 1946 (aged 48) Nanjing, Republic of China
- Party: Kuomintang
- Other political affiliations: Blue Shirts Society
- Spouse: Mao Xiucong (1915–1939)
- Education: Whampoa Military Academy
- Awards: Order of Blue Sky and White Sun
- Nicknames: China's Himmler; Chinese Gestapo; King of Spies; Chiang Kai-shek's Sabre

Military service
- Allegiance: Republic of China
- Years of service: 1927–1946
- Rank: Lieutenant General
- Battles/wars: Second Sino-Japanese War; Chinese Civil War

Dai Li
- Chinese: 戴笠
Transcriptions
Standard Mandarin
- Wade–Giles: Tai^{4} Li^{4}

Courtesy name
- Traditional Chinese: 雨農
- Simplified Chinese: 雨农
Transcriptions
Standard Mandarin
- Hanyu Pinyin: Yǔnóng

Birth name
- Traditional Chinese: 戴春風
- Simplified Chinese: 戴春风
Transcriptions
Standard Mandarin
- Hanyu Pinyin: Dài Chūnfēng
- Wade–Giles: Tai^{4} Chun^{1}-feng^{1}

Dai Li (Chinese: 戴笠; pinyin: Dài Lì; 28 May 1897 – 17 March 1946), courtesy name Yunong, was a Chinese lieutenant general and spymaster. Dai was born in Jiangshan, Zhejiang and later studied at the Whampoa Military Academy, where Chiang Kai-shek served as Chief Commandant, and later became head of the Bureau of Investigation and Statistics (BIS) within the Nationalist government of the Republic of China (ROC).

== Early years ==
Born Dai Chunfeng, he was just four years old when his father died, leaving his mother to raise him. At the age of six, Dai was enrolled in a private academy the Linsen elementary school, to study Chinese classics; he later graduated as valedictorian from Wenxi County Elementary School. His mother could not afford to send him to university, so at the age of 16 he had to leave home and make his own way in the world. With no steady income or guidance, he began living on the streets of Shanghai. Until 1923, he was mentored by labor organizer and hitman Wang Yaqiao. Dai Chunfeng soon became a skilled gambler who could often be found in one of Shanghai's many casinos, trying to win enough money to make ends meet. It was in a Shanghai casino that he met Du Yuesheng, head of the criminal organization known as the "Green Gang".

Through Du Yuesheng, he later met Chiang Kai-shek. It is unclear when Chiang and Dai first met, but it was probably around 1921. Dai later lost all his money and was forced to return to Bao'an. In 1927, Dai met his elementary school friend Mao Renfeng, who suggested that Dai enroll in the Whampoa Military Academy in Guangzhou, where Chiang served as Superintendent-Commandant (1924–1947). Dai followed the suggestion, obtained a letter of recommendation from Du Yuesheng, and made his way to Guangzhou. In 1925, Dai enrolled in the 1st Student Regiment of the Sixth Class of the KMT Officer Training Academy. At this time, he changed his name to "Dai Li," which in Chinese refers to an assassin's hooded veil, reflecting the clandestine nature of his planned future career. Chiang soon made him a student informant to spy on Communist activities within the academy, where he played an instrumental role in the Zhongshan Warship Incident of March 1926.

== Role in KMT ==
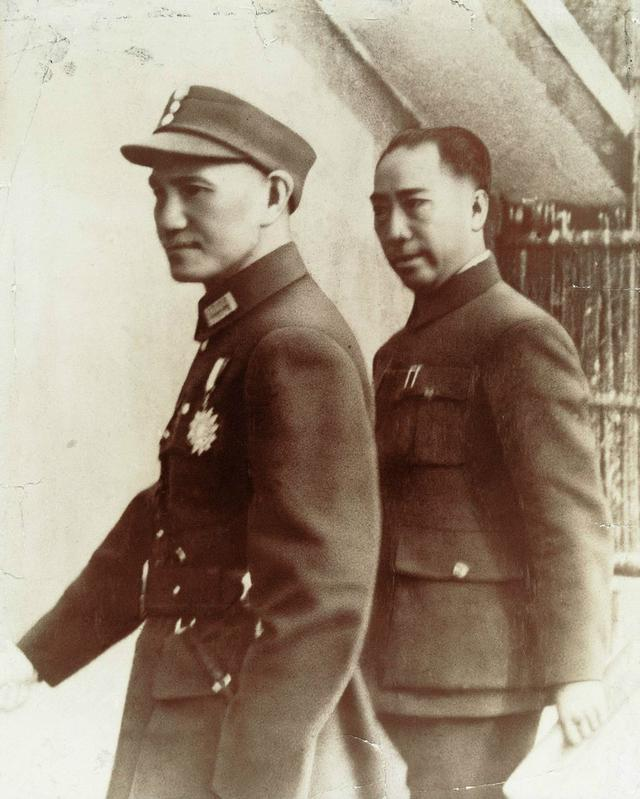
Chiang and Dai in the 1940s.

As chief of Kuomintang (KMT) Army Intelligence in China, Dai Li helped establish China's first modern intelligence organization in 1928: the "Clandestine Investigation Section" directly under the headquarters of the Northern Expeditionary Army, with the goal of winning the war early, quelling nationwide unrest, and minimizing loss of life by making the best use of military and political intelligence. By the end of the Second Sino-Japanese War, this small section would evolve into the very complex and controversial Investigation and Statistics Bureau of the Chinese National Military Council, which was the predecessor of the Military Intelligence Bureau of the Ministry of National Defense of Taiwan.

The benign title of the Investigation and Statistics Bureau belied the true nature of its secret police work, which made Dai one of the most powerful men in Republican China. Dai was also the head of the fascist Blue Shirts Society. In the 1930s and 1940s, his agents in the Military Statistics Bureau (then the KMT's military intelligence agency) successfully penetrated the Chinese Communist Party (CCP) and Imperial Japanese puppet organizations.

To suppress Communist activities, Dai employed extrajudicial means including assassination, arbitrary arrests, and torture, with Chiang's explicit or tacit approval.

Dai sought to use the Frédéric-Vincent Lebbe-led Military Commission North China Battlefront Supervisory Corps for anti-Communist intelligence gathering, in addition to anti-Japanese intelligence gathering. Historical views of whether Lebbe was aware of this differ.

Dai cooperated with the United States during World War II, learning new methods of espionage and growing his guerrilla force to some 70,000 men. In return for the partnership, he provided maps of the southern Chinese coast, intelligence on Japanese maneuvers, and safe haven for downed Allied aircrew. After the signing of the Sino-American Cooperative Organization Treaty in 1942, Dai was appointed head of Sino-American intelligence activities.

While he shunned public entertainment and remained a mysterious figure to his countrymen, Dai was privately known for his wild drinking parties. In Stilwell (2001), Barbara Tuchman called Dai "China's combination of Himmler and J. Edgar Hoover".

== Death ==
Dai died in a plane crash on March 17, 1946. It was speculated that this may have been arranged by the Chinese Communist Party's intelligence and security chief, Kang Sheng, of the Central Social Affairs Department (SAD). Rumors circulated that the crash had been arranged by the American Office of Strategic Services (OSS) because of Dai's anti-Americanism, since it occurred on an American plane.

== Legacy ==
Dai was later the namesake of the fictional Dai Li, the secret police of Ba Sing Se in the cartoon, Avatar: The Last Airbender.
