= Shanghai Affairs =

1998 Hong Kong film by Donnie Yen

- DVD cover
- Traditional Chinese: 新唐山大兄
- Simplified Chinese: 新唐山大兄
- Hanyu Pinyin: Xīn Táng Shān Dà Xiōng
- Jyutping: San1 Tong4 Saan1 Daai6 Hing1
- Directed by: Donnie Yen
- Produced by: Wynn Lau; Rainy Chan
- Starring: Donnie Yen; Athena Chu; Yu Rongguang; Cheung Hung; Ruco Chan; Yan Yee-shek
- Cinematography: Stephen Poon; Woo Sze-kwong
- Edited by: Ng Kam-wah
- Music by: Cheung Yiu-san
- Distributed by: Sam niang Po Entertainment
- Release date: 3 July 1998
- Running time: 90 minutes
- Country: Hong Kong
- Language: Cantonese

Shanghai Affairs is a 1998 Hong Kong martial arts film starring and directed by Donnie Yen.

== Plot ==
Tong Shan (Donnie Yen) is a doctor who returns from Britain to Shanghai after graduating from medical school. Tong opens a clinic in a poor village in Shanghai to help sick people who cannot afford medical care. However, the Axe Gang, led by Yue Lo-chat, arrives and plans to tear apart the village and build a casino there. Tong and his assistant, Bond (Ruco Chan), protect the village and drive the gang away, angering Yue. One day, Tong meets Yue's younger sister, Yue Siu-sin (Athena Chu), who is mute due to an illness. Tong cures Siu-sin, and their relationship grows closer, which angers Yue Lo-chat even more since he is against Western medicine. Later, some kids are kidnapped and found dead without internal organs. Tong investigates and discovers that his mentor, Lui Mung, and Yue are the masterminds behind this. Lui and Yue frame Tong, and Yue starts a persecution of Tong.

== Cast ==
- Donnie Yen as Tong Shan, the main protagonist, is a charitable doctor who studied in Great Britain and returned to Shanghai to cure poor people.
- Athena Chu as Yue Siu-sin, Yue Lo-chat's younger sister, a young girl who is mute due to an illness. She is later cured by Tong Shan and becomes his love interest.
- Yu Rongguang as Yue Lo-chat, the main antagonist, the leader of the Axe Gang
- Cheung Hung as Yip Ling, Yue Siu-sin's friend
- Ruco Chan as Bond Lau, Tong Shan's assistant
- Yan Yee-shek as Lung, Yue Lo-chat's henchman who mistakenly killed Siu-sin during his mission to kill Tong Shan.
- Sing Cheung-ban
- Man Cho-han
- Lam Yiu-san
- Lee Qui
- Lam Man-ying
