= Du Yuesheng =

Chinese mobster (1888–1951)

- 杜月笙
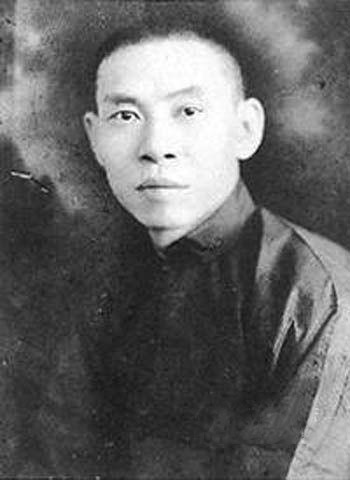
- Du in the 1940s
- Born: Du Yuesheng (Chinese: 杜月生; pinyin: Dù yuèshēng); 22 August 1888; Gaoqiao, Pudong, Qing Dynasty
- Died: 16 August 1951 (aged 62); British Hong Kong
- Resting place: Du Yuesheng Cemetery, Xizhi District, New Taipei City, Taiwan
- Occupation: Underworld Leader
- Height: 5'10
- Spouses: Shen Yueying; Chen Yuying; Sun Peihao; Yao Yulan; Meng Xiaodong (m. 1950; div. 1951)
- Children: Du Weiping (son); Du Weishan (son); Du Weixi (son); Du Weihan (son); Du Weiwei (son); Du Weining (son); Du Weixin (son); Du Weiwei (son); Du Meiru (daughter); Du Meixia (daughter); Du Meijuan (daughter)

Du Yuesheng
- Chinese: 杜月笙
Transcriptions
Standard Mandarin
- Hanyu Pinyin: Dù Yuèshēng
- Wade–Giles: Tu^{4} Yüeh^{4}-sheng^{1}
Yue: Cantonese
- Yale Romanization: Dou Yut-sang

Du Yong
- Traditional Chinese: 杜鏞
- Simplified Chinese: 杜镛
Transcriptions
Standard Mandarin
- Hanyu Pinyin: Dù Yōng
- Wade–Giles: Tu^{4} Yung^{1}

Du Yuesheng (original name)
- Chinese: 杜月生
Transcriptions
Standard Mandarin
- Hanyu Pinyin: Dù Yuèshēng

Du Yuesheng (22 August 1888 – 16 August 1951), nicknamed "Big-Eared Du", was a Chinese mob boss who spent much of his life in Shanghai. He made his fortune in the opium trade before transforming into a financial tycoon. He supported Chiang Kai-shek and the Kuomintang in their fight against the Communists and Japanese. In April 1949, on the eve of the fall of Shanghai, Du moved to Hong Kong, where he lived until his death in 1951.

== Names ==
Du's original name was Du Yuesheng (Chinese: 杜月生; pinyin: Dù Yuèshēng; Wade–Giles: Tu^{4} Yüeh^{4}-sheng^{1}). Later, on the advice of Zhang Binglin, Du changed his name to Du Yong (traditional Chinese: 杜鏞; simplified Chinese: 杜镛; pinyin: Dù Yōng; Wade–Giles: Tu^{4} Yung^{1}), pseudonym Yuesheng (Chinese: 月笙; pinyin: Yuèshēng; Wade–Giles: Yüeh^{4}-sheng^{1}; same pronunciation as his original name but written differently in Chinese). Other than pinyin, Du Yuesheng is variously transliterated as Dou Yu-Seng, Tu Yueh-sheng or Du Yueh-sheng,

== Early life ==
Du was born in Gaoqiao and his family moved to Shanghai in 1889, a year after his birth. By the time he was nine years old, Du had lost his immediate family: his mother died in childbirth, his sister was sold into slavery, his father died, and his stepmother vanished. He then returned to Gaoqiao and lived with his grandmother. He returned to Shanghai in 1902 and worked at a fruit stall in the French Concession but was later fired for theft. He wandered around for some time before becoming a bodyguard in a brothel, where he became acquainted with the Green Gang. He joined the gang at the age of 16.

== Rise to power ==
Du was soon introduced by a friend to Huang Jinrong, the highest-ranked Chinese detective in the French Concession Police (FCP) and one of Shanghai's most notorious gangsters. Huang's wife Lin Guisheng favoured the young Du. Even though Huang was not a member of the Green Gang, Du became Huang's gambling and opium enforcer. A stickler for fine clothing and women, Du was now cemented; he wore only Chinese silks, surrounded himself with White Russian bodyguards, and frequented the city's best nightclubs and sing-song houses. Du was also known for having a superstitious streak — he had three small monkey heads, specially imported from Hong Kong, sewn to his clothes at the small of his back.

Du's prestige led him to purchase a four-storey, Western-style mansion in the French Concession and have dozens of concubines, four legal wives and six sons, but his meteoric rise as Shanghai's best known mobster only came after Huang Jinrong's arrest in 1924 by the Shanghai Garrison police for his public beating of Lu Xiaojia, son of the then Shanghai-ruling tuchun Lu Yongxiang. By various accounts, Lu Xiaojia either booed the singer Lu Lanchun off the stage or started pursuing her, who married Huang in 1922. It required Du's diplomacy and finances to save his mentor, after which Du, Huang, and Zhang Xiaolin, another Green Gang member, became sworn brothers, together known as the "Three Tycoons of Shanghai".

By the 1930s, Du controlled much of Shanghai's gambling dens, prostitution, and protection rackets. With the tacit support of the police and colonial government, he also now ran the French Concession's opium trade, and became heavily addicted to his own drug.

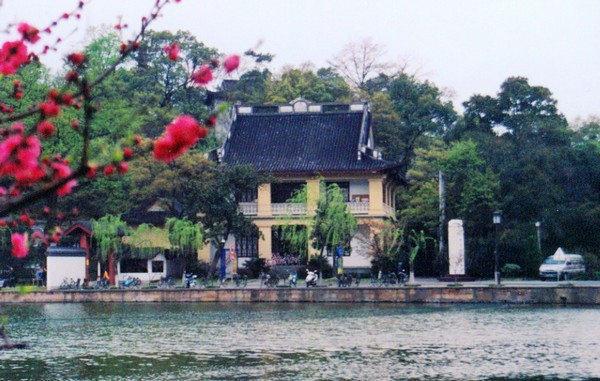
Former residence of Du Yuesheng, a historic house in Hangzhou, Zhejiang.

== Alliance with the Kuomintang ==
Du had close ties with Chiang Kai-shek, who in turn had ties to both the Green Gang and other organised secret societies from his early years in Shanghai. In April 1927, Du, along with his sworn brothers Huang Jinrong and Zhang Xiaolin, conspired with Chiang to form the Chinese Progress Association (中華共進會), a para-militant group masquerading as a left-wing group to prepare for Chiang's coup. On the night of April 11, Du's right-hand man, Wan Molin, killed Wang Shouhua, Shanghai's labor leader, at Du's residence. Du's gang members, wearing armbands marked "Labor" (工), then set upon the city's workers and left-wing activists, leading up to Chiang's Shanghai massacre.

Chiang established the Nanjing Nationalist Government after the coup, rewarding Du with a title of major general and advisory positions to the military headquarters and the Executive Yuan. The French Concession authorities also appointed Du as an advisor to the Chinese director of the Public Council. Du also helped the Kuomintang with the intelligence gathering in Shanghai, forging a brotherhood with Dai Li and Yang Hu.

Starting in 1928, Du ventured into the financial world, founding Zhonghui Bank and later becoming a director or supervisor at the Bank of China and the Bank of Communications. He also became a director at the Shanghai Cotton Exchange and the Shanghai Stock Exchange.

After the Mukden Incident in 1931, Du became active in wartime services, organizing donation drives, boycotts of Japanese goods, and funding academic and artistic activities. In the same year, Du used his financial and political clout to open a temple dedicated to his ancestors, celebrating its opening with a grand three-day party attended by hundreds of celebrities and a gifted plaque from Chiang Kai-shek. However, within months, the temple's private wings were converted into a heroin manufacturing facility, making it one of East Asia's largest drug factories.

Du established the Heng Society in November 1932 as a front for political activities. When the Second World War broke out in 1937, Du, unlike his sworn brother Zhang Xiaolin, refused to cooperate with the Japanese and eventually fled to Hong Kong. Green Gang operatives cooperating with Dai Li, Chiang's intelligence chief, continued to smuggle weapons and goods to the Nationalist forces throughout the war. Du served as a board member of the Chinese Red Cross, and also established several companies and factories in the free area of China.

After the war, Du returned to Shanghai, founded the newspaper Shang Pao, with the intention to be the mayor but eventually gave up to Wu Shaoshu under Chiang's pressure. Du instead was elected representative of the People's Congress of the Nationalist Government in 1948. He was also president or director of over 70 commercial organizations, and held leadership roles in more than 200 enterprises and institutions. The relationship between Du and Chiang, however, further soured when Chiang's son, Chiang Ching-kuo, launched an anti-corruption campaign in Shanghai in 1948, with Du's son, Du Weiping, was targeted and eventually sentenced to six months.

== Exile in Hong Kong ==
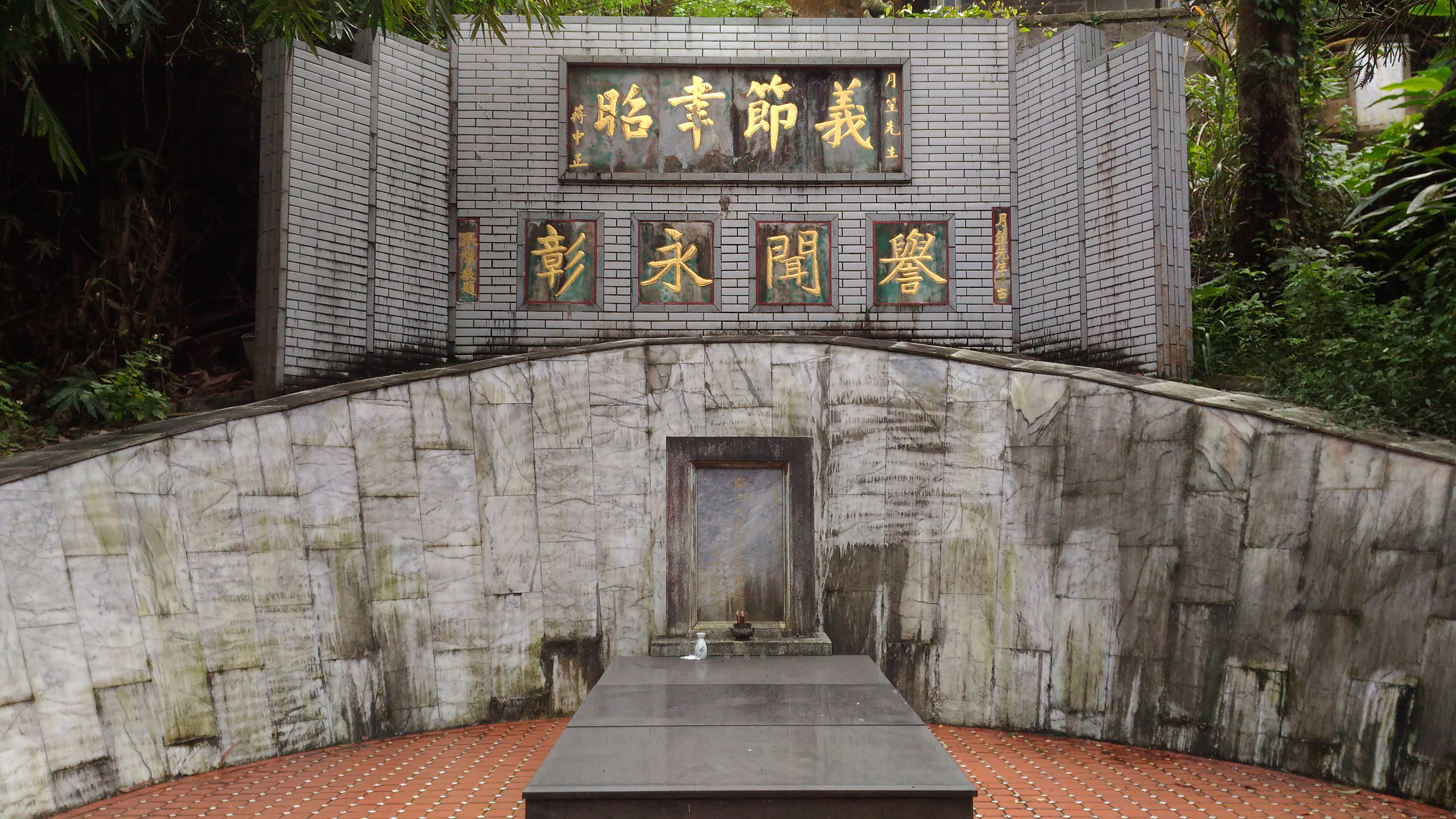
Tomb of Du Yuesheng

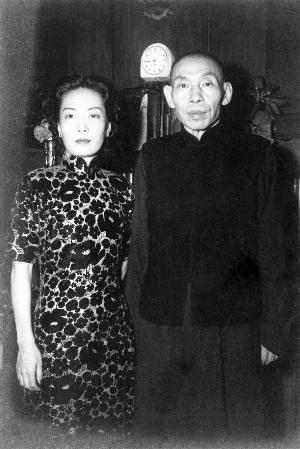
Du and fifth wife Meng Xiaodong

In 1949, on the eve of the fall of Shanghai, Du moved to British Hong Kong, despite the olive branches from both the Kuomintang and Communists. His health deteriorated rapidly due to asthma. He died in Hong Kong in 1951. His body was taken to Taiwan, and buried in Xizhi District, New Taipei, though some are skeptical that his tomb actually contains his body. Following his interment the Taiwanese authorities constructed a statue of Du in Xizhi. The four-character inscription on the statue praises Du's "loyalty" and "personal integrity".

== Personal life ==
Du Yuesheng had five wives during his lifetime: Shen Yueying, Chen Yuying, Sun Peihao, Yao Yulan and Meng Xiaodong (wed 1950; divorced 1951).

Du Weishan, Du's seventh son, served as one of the first secret intermediaries between Taipei and Beijing in the early 1980s, when the two administrations did not have official channels of communication. He was also a numismatist who then lived in Vancouver, Canada, and died in March 2020; later in his life he donated ancient coins to the Shanghai Museum.

Du Meiru, Du's eldest daughter, settled with her husband in Jordan in the 1960s and operated a restaurant. She also took part as herself in the film I Wish I Knew by Jia Zhangke.

== In popular culture ==
Some depictions of Du in popular culture include:

- The novel White Shanghai by Elvira Baryakina (Ripol Classic, 2010, ISBN 978-5-386-02069-9) mentions the story of Du's coming to power.
- The short story "Mother Tongue" by Amy Tan mentions Du's early days and purported visit to Tan's mother's wedding.
- Lord of the East China Sea (上海皇帝之歲月風雲) and Lord of the East China Sea II (上海皇帝之雄霸天下), a 1993 two-set Hong Kong film based on Du's life. Ray Lui plays the lead character Lu Yunsheng (陸雲生).
- The Founding of a Republic (建国大业), a 2009 historical film commissioned by the Chinese government. Du is portrayed by Feng Xiaogang in a cameo role.
- Shanghai, Shanghai (2010), a 2010 TV drama, where Gu Yecheng, based on Du, is played by Wu Xiubo.
- The Last Tycoon (大上海), a 2012 Hong Kong film, where the main character Cheng Daqi (成大器), portrayed by Chow Yun-fat and Huang Xiaoming at two different stages in his life, is loosely based on Du.
- In the 2015 Hong Kong TVB Drama Lord of Shanghai. The main character of the drama is based on Du Yuesheng which is named Kiu Ngo Tin. Kiu Ngo Tin is portrayed by Anthony Wong and the younger version is portrayed by Kenneth Ma.
- A cancelled video game Whore of the Orient was going to be set in 1936 Shanghai during Du's rule.
- Fictionalized characters, which to various extents were inspired by Du and by events from his life, were featured in the 1976 film Ba bai zhuang shi, the 1986 film Da Shang Hai 1937, the 2016 film Luo man di ke xiao wang shi, and the 2017 film Jian jun da ye.

== See also ==
- Meyer Lansky, a Jewish mob banker
- Michele Sindona, an Italian mafia banker
