= Huang Jinrong =

Chinese detective and gangster

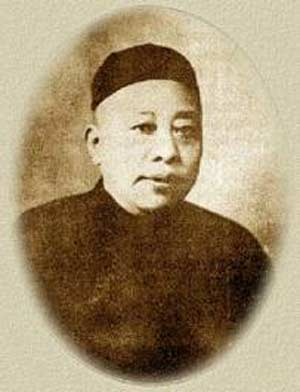
- Huang in the 1930s
- Born: December 14, 1868; Suzhou, Jiangsu, Qing China
- Died: 10 May 1953 (aged 85); Shanghai, People's Republic of China
- Occupations: Chinese chief detective and Gangster

Huang Jinrong (Chinese: 黃金榮; Wade–Giles: Hwang Chin-jung; 10 May 1868 – 20 June 1953), nicknamed "Pockmarked" due to a bad case of smallpox, was a Chinese chief detective who worked for the French Concession police force in Shanghai from 1892 to 1925. Even though he was a detective, he was also one of three major Green Gang bosses along with Du Yuesheng and Zhang Xiaolin in Shanghai. Huang remained in Shanghai during the Japanese occupation and after the Communist takeover. He was made an example during the Chinese Communist Party's Campaign to Suppress Counterrevolutionaries and died of illness in 1953.

== Early life ==
Huang was born in Suzhou and moved, at the age of 5, to Shanghai where his father opened a teahouse. He worked as an apprentice in a picture framing shop near the City God Temple. He later worked at his father's teahouse, where he developed connections with criminal and hustling patrons. Due to his father's connections with the constabulary, Huang was easily able to test into the French Concession police at the age of 24 in 1892.

== Career ==
Huang began his career for the French Concession in 1892 as a detective. He quickly rose to prominence as one of the leading detectives because he was able to solve many cases with assistance from the contacts he made in his father's teahouse. After an argument with his French officer, Huang briefly retired to Suzhou until he was brought back into the French police force based on his strength as a sleuth. His criminal influence grew as he organized drug trafficking, gambling dens, and granting "favors" to criminals. Each day, Huang held court to determine whether a felon should be turned over to the police. He married Lin Guisheng in 1900, who partly managed his opium dealings. Huang was introduced to Du Yuesheng, whom Huang appointed to run some of his opium dens. Crime in the French Concession increased as Huang had such a prominent position in the police force and organized most of the Green Gang's activity in this zone.

Huang was dismissed from the police force in 1924 after he publicly beat the Shanghai Warlord Lu Yongxiang's son. He was arrested by the Shanghai Garrison, and only released after Du Yuesheng and Zhang Xiaolin negotiated and paid for his release. Huang stepped down from the police force but remained one of the Green Gang's bosses, which he formally joined in 1927.

== Later life ==
Huang Jinrong remained in Shanghai for the rest of his life, controlling the Green Gang. Together with Du, he worked with the Chiang Kai-shek to suppress the Communist movement in Shanghai in 1927.

Huang eventually died of sickness at the age of 85 in 1953.

== In popular culture ==
- In the 2012 film The Last Tycoon, the character Hong Shouting portrayed by Sammo Hung is based on Huang Jinrong.
- In the 2015 Hong Kong TVB Drama Lord of Shanghai, the character Chak Kam Tong portrayed by Kent Tong is based on Huang Jinrong.
- In the 2021 film 1921, Huang Jinrong is portrayed by Ni Dahong.
