= Green Gang =

Chinese secret society

- 青幫
- Years active: c.1700 - c.1955
- Territory: Shanghai
- Ethnicity: Chinese
- Leader: Du Yuesheng
- Activities: gambling, pimping, contract killings, kidnapping, drug trafficking, corruption, extortion
- Allies: Kuomintang

The Green Gang (Chinese: 青幫; pinyin: Qīng Bāng) was a Chinese secret society and criminal triad organization, which was prominent in criminal, social and political activity in Shanghai during the early to mid 20th century.

== History ==
=== Origins ===
As a secret society, the origins and history of the Green Gang are complex. The society has its roots in the Luojiao, a Buddhist sect founded by Luo Qing (羅清) in the mid-Ming dynasty; during the early 18th century in the Qing dynasty, the sect was introduced among workers involved in the transport of grain along the Grand Canal via the efforts of three sworn brothers: Weng Yan (翁岩), Qian Jian (錢堅) and Pan Qing (潘清). Luoist groups mixed with the pre-existing societies for grain transport boatmen along the Canal, providing services such as burials and hostels, and also served as a social organization for the boatmen. However, they were perceived as a threat by the authorities, and in 1768 the Qianlong Emperor ordered the destruction of Luoist temples and proscribed the sect. This had the effect of driving the sect underground, where it became centred on the grain fleets themselves.

During the upheavals of the 19th century, including the Taiping Rebellion and the change in course of the Yellow River around 1855, the shipment of grain along the Grand Canal was severely disrupted and finally ended. This again scattered the boatmen, who either joined local rebellions like the Taiping and Nian rebellions, or shifted to the coast to join the salt smuggling trade. In northern part of Jiangsu Province (subei) in the 1870s, boatmen and salt smugglers began to organize into what was called the Anqing Daoyou (安清道友, literally "Friends of the Way of Tranquility and Purity"), which was the direct precursor to the Green Gang in the early 20th century.

=== Appearance in Shanghai ===
Shanghai became a favourable place for criminal activity, and the Green Gang in particular, due to several factors. As the Grand Canal fell out of use for grain shipments, replaced by the sea route, Shanghai became an important transshipment point for grain; at the same time, as one of the treaty ports and concessions, it was a gateway for foreign trade, including in opium. The presence of the Shanghai International Settlement and the French Concession, which were under different jurisdictions and administrations, also made for a disjointed legal environment that favoured organised crime. Finally, massive Chinese immigration into Shanghai meant that associations based on common ancestral hometowns or sworn loyalties became important factors of Shanghai social life, and the Green Gang worked through these networks. For example, Du Yuesheng, who would become one of the most prominent Green Gang leaders in Shanghai, was introduced to Huang Jinrong, an earlier leader, because his mentor was a native of Suzhou like Huang.

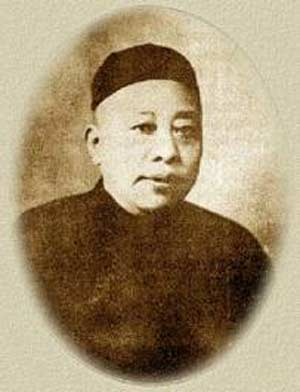
Huang Jinrong

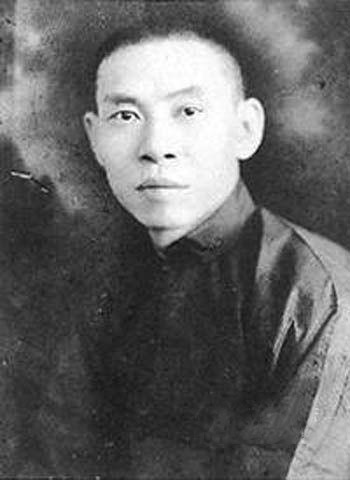
Du Yuesheng

Boundary of Hongkew or the American settlement at Shanghai in 1915 from Colonel Philip S. Donnell stationed in Philippines and China. Pathfinder docked in China for repairs, Donnell visited the American Settlement where he met Chiang Kai-Shek. Chiang returned to Shanghai in 1915 and spent a few years moving in a shady world of business and organized crime as part of a secret organization called the "Green Society".

=== Prominence in Shanghai ===
By the 20th century it had acquired such wealth and power that it had become corrupt, and included many successful businessmen. Under Du Yuesheng, it controlled the criminal activities in the entire city of Shanghai. The Green Gang focused on opium (which was supported by local warlords), extortion, gambling, and prostitution. Shanghai was considered by some the vice capital of the world at that time.

The Green Gang was often hired by Chiang Kai-shek's Kuomintang to break up union meetings and labor strikes and was also involved in the Chinese Civil War. One of the leaders of the Green Gang, Ying Guixin, was also involved in Yuan Shikai's assassination of the rival politician Song Jiaoren in 1913. Carrying the name of the Society for Common Progress, it was — along with other criminal gangs — responsible for the White Terror massacre of approximately 5,000 pro-Communist strikers in Shanghai in April 1927, which was ordered by Nationalist leader Chiang Kai-shek. Chiang granted Du Yuesheng the rank of general in the National Revolutionary Army later.

The Green Gang was a major financial supporter of Chiang Kai-shek, who became acquainted with the gang when he lived in Shanghai from 1915 to 1923. The Green Gang shared its profits from the drug trade with the Kuomintang after the creation of the Opium Suppression Bureau. Chiang Kai-shek's brother-in-law and financial minister T. V. Soong also partnered with the pro-Chiang Green Gang to pressure Shanghai banks to buy up national securities. In the last two years of the Nanjing decade (1936–1937), the Green Gang continued to pressure big business to buy up national bonds, as a means of compensating for the lack of corporate tax imposed by the government.

=== Last years in Hong Kong ===
After the defeat of Chiang Kai-shek's regime on the mainland in 1949, the Green Gang left Shanghai and in the early 1950s opened heroin refineries in Hong Kong. In the following years, the organization suffered in struggles against local syndicates over the control of the drug market. By the mid-1950s it had disappeared. Control of the heroin market was then taken by small syndicates of ethnic Chaozhou hailing from the nearby coastal town of Swatow. They used the Green Gang's chemists and expanded the consumption of heroin in Hong Kong. In the early 1960s, they spread their influence in South-East Asia and by the end of the decade Hong Kong chemists inaugurated the first laboratory of high-grade no. 4 heroin along the border between Thailand and Burma, introducing the technology that made the Golden Triangle the largest heroin producer in the world.

== See also ==
- Tiandihui
- 14K Triad
- Bamboo Union
  - Tung Kuei-sen
  - Chen Chi-li

== Sources ==
- Martin, Brian G. (1996). The Shanghai Green Gang: Politics and Organized Crime, 1919-1937.
- Wang, Peng (2017). The Chinese Mafia: Organized Crime, Corruption, and Extra-Legal Protection. Oxford: Oxford University Press. Chapter 2 'Gangs as Pseudo-government'.

"Chiang Kai-Shek and Chinese Modernization" by Jay Taylor is an account of the political and economic influence of Chiang Kai-shek during his reign of power, including his relationship with The Green Gang.
