= Our Neighborhood Arts and Physical Education =

South Korean television series

- Also known as: Cool Kiz On The Block
- Hangul: 우리동네 예능과 체육의 능력자
- Hanja: 우리洞네藝能과體育의能力者
- RR: Uridongne yeneunggwa cheyugui neungnyeokja
- MR: Uridongne yenŭnggwa ch'eyugŭi nŭngnyŏkcha
- Genre: Variety
- Created by: Choi Jae-young
- Written by: Moon Eun-ae
- Presented by: Kang Ho-dong
- Country of origin: South Korea
- Original language: Korean
- No. of episodes: 174

Production
- Producer: Lee Ye-ji
- Running time: 80 mins.
- Production company: SM C&C

Original release
- Network: KBS2
- Release: 9 April 2013 – 4 October 2016

Our Neighborhood Arts and Physical Education (Korean: 우리동네 예능과 체육의 능력자), also known as Cool Kiz on The Block, was a South Korean television sports variety show which premiered on 9 April 2013 on KBS2. It was the replacement show of Moonlight Prince. The program's last episode aired on 4 October 2016 and it was succeeded by Trick & True.

== History ==
It was announced on March 25, 2013 by a staff member at KBS's entertainment division to media outlet Star News that Kang Ho-dong, Lee Soo-geun, and Kim Byung-man would star as the MC's for a new sports variety show that would replace Moonlight Prince called "Our Neighborhood Arts and Physical Education." He also said that they were hoping to add a few more cast members. It was also announced that Lee Ye-ji will head the program and Moon Eun-ae would be the main writer, from Moonlight Prince and that Choi Jae-young, the main writer for 1 Night 2 Days came up with the idea for the show. KBS said the show would be about everyday people that excel at arts and exercise. The MCs will go to various neighborhood and compete against them and it will be mostly outdoors, but will sometimes be filmed in studio. KBS said that the show would record in early April and the first episode would air on April 9.

On March 27, 2013 it was announced that TVXQ's Max Changmin had been selected as one of the MC's for the program. It was also unfortunately revealed that though Kim Byung-man will appear on the show, he would only be joining temporarily for the show's first project. Jo Dal-han, Park Sung Ho, and SHINee's Minho were revealed as the first guests. It was also revealed that the first few episodes would be centered around the ping pong project.

It premiered on April 9 and debuted number one in its timeslot, beating SBS's Hwasin – Controller of the Heart. AGB Nielsen Korea reported on April 10 that the first episode received a 6.2% viewer rating, a solid rating for its time slot.

== Format ==
One sport is chosen for a period of time and a team consisting of a few celebrities competes against citizens from all across South Korea. A few rules of the sport are customized to suit the broadcasting time. For most of the sports they challenge a local amateur team in an official match after some basic training, but the format is subject to change depending on the sports they are doing: for example, when the sport was taekwondo, the celebrity team chose citizens to train together with them and when tennis was the chosen sport they entered a national competition. So far, the show has covered table tennis, bowling, badminton, basketball, taekwondo, football, tennis, foot volleyball, cycling, swimming, judo, wrestling, volleyball, and archery.

The members of the celebrity team change every time they change sports but a few are fixed members: in a few of the earlier episodes Kang Ho-dong, Lee Soo-geun, and Max Changmin were fixed members, but in later episodes Kang Ho-dong is the only fixed MC while the other members rotate, including Jeong Hyeong-don, John Park, Seo Ji-seok, Oh Man-seok and Yang Sang-guk.

== List of episodes ==
=== 2013 ===
List of episodes in 2013

Episode	Airdate	Sport	Team member	Summary
1	April 9, 2013	Table tennis	Kang Ho-dong, Lee Soo-geun, Max Changmin, Choi Minho (SHINee), Kim Byung Man, Jo Dal-Hwan, Park Seong-ho	The Introduction of table tennis; The MCs recruit celebrities to prepare for their first table tennis match.
2	April 16, 2013	Table tennis	Kang Ho-dong, Lee Soo-geun, Max Changmin, Choi Minho (SHINee), Kim Byung Man, Jo Dal-Hwan, Park Seong-ho	The first match against Sangdo-dong Table Tennis Club, which includes players from 10 years of experience to an 82-year-old grandmother to a 12-year-old table tennis prodigy
3	April 23, 2013	Table tennis	Kang Ho-dong, Lee Soo-geun, Max Changmin, Jo Dal-Hwan, Park Seong-ho, Kim Jae-kyung (Rainbow), Jung Eun-pyo	Back to training with members change; Try to improve skills with the help of professional table tennis player Lee Soo-yeon; A match against Mokdong Table Tennis Club
4	April 30, 2013	Table tennis	Kang Ho-dong, Lee Soo-geun, Max Changmin, Jo Dal-Hwan, Park Seong-ho, Kim Jae-kyung (Rainbow), Jung Eun-pyo	A match against Mokdong Table Tennis Club, which has 84 years old grandfather as one of the player; Table tennis player Lee Soo-yeon came to match as their coach; End of Table tennis
5	May 7, 2013	Bowling	Kang Ho-dong, Lee Soo-geun, Max Changmin, Jo Dal-Hwan, Alex Chu, Ahn Hyeong-jun	New sport and leisure activity: bowling; Three main cast call their friends and have a game to find who has the most flexibility; Cast celebrities to join their bowling team
6	May 14, 2013	Bowling	Kang Ho-dong, Lee Soo-geun, Max Changmin, Jo Dal-Hwan, Alex Chu, Ahn Hyeong-jun, Lee Byeong-Jin	Train hard to learn bowling and improving their skills; Cast another player to be in their team; Preparing for the first bowling match
7 – 8	May 21, 2013; May 28, 2013	Bowling	Kang Ho-dong, Lee Soo-geun, Max Changmin, Jo Dal-Hwan, Alex Chu, Ahn Hyeong-jun, Lee Byeong-Jin	First away game against Wolseong United
9	June 4, 2013	Bowling	Kang Ho-dong, Lee Soo-geun, Max Changmin, Jo Dal-Hwan, Alex Chu, Lee Byeong-Jin, Kim Young-chul	Hardcore training; Get a lesson from a pro bowler; Start the second bowling match against Dongchun Heroes
10	June 11, 2013	Bowling	Kang Ho-dong, Lee Soo-geun, Max Changmin, Jo Dal-Hwan, Alex Chu, Lee Byeong-Jin, Kim Young-chul	The match against Dongchun Heroes
11	June 18, 2013	Bowling	Kang Ho-dong, Lee Soo-geun, Max Changmin, Jo Dal-Hwan, Alex Chu, Lee Byeong-Jin, Yoon Bora (Sistar)	The match against Shinhwa; Doing punishment promoting Shinhwa's album because of losing the match; Training for the next match
12	June 25, 2013	Bowling	Kang Ho-dong, Lee Soo-geun, Max Changmin, Jo Dal-Hwan, Alex Chu, Lee Byeong-Jin, Yoon Bora (Sistar)	The match against Noeun of Daejeon
13	July 2, 2013	Bowling	Kang Ho-dong, Lee Soo-geun, Max Changmin, Jo Dal-Hwan, Alex Chu, Lee Byeong-Jin, Andy (Shinhwa)	Training hard for the match; The last bowling match against Gwangju Ssangcheon team
14	July 9, 2013	Badminton	Kang Ho-dong, Lee Soo-geun, Max Changmin, Jo Dal-Hwan, Nichkhun Chansung Wooyoung (2PM), John Park, Lee Jong-soo, Lee Mangi, Feeldog	Introducing new sports and new team members; Skill tests and training with national badminton coach Lee Dong-soo
15	July 16, 2013	Badminton	Kang Ho-dong, Lee Soo-geun, Max Changmin, Jo Dal-Hwan, Nichkhun Chansung (2PM), John Park, Lee Jong-soo, Feeldog	First badminton match against Junggok Seoul team; Opening match guest by basketball coach Wu Ji-won; The doubles partners; Kang Ho-dong John Park; Lee Soo-geun Nickhun; Max Changmin Lee Jong-soo; Jo Dal-Hwan Feeldog; Nichkhun, Chansung
16	July 23, 2013	Badminton	Kang Ho-dong, Lee Soo-geun, Kim Dong-jun, Jo Dal-Hwan, Chansung, Lee Jong-soo, Feeldog, Lee Mangi	Training for the match with elementary students; Practice match against Soui Elementary School badminton students
17	July 30, 2013	Badminton	Kang Ho-dong, Lee Soo-geun, Max Changmin, Jo Dal-Hwan, Chansung, John Park, Kim Dong-jun, Lee Jong-soo, Feeldog, Lee Mangi Lee Ji-hoon	The second badminton match against Jungsan-dong, Geoyang-shi; The doubles partners; Kang Ho-dong John Park; Lee Soo-geun Le Mangi; Max Changmin Lee Jong-soo; Kim Dong-jun Feeldog; Chansung Lee Ji-hoon
18	August 6, 2013	Badminton	Kang Ho-dong, Lee Soo-geun, Max Changmin, Jo Dal-Hwan, Chansung, John Park, Lee Jong-soo, Feeldog, Lee Mangi Lee Ji-hoon	Training Day Menu 1: Rafting at Naerincheon; Change double partner; Max Changmin Lee Jong-soo; Kang Ho-dong John Park; Lee Mangi Lee Ji-hoon; Lee Soo-geun Jo Dal-Hwan; Chansung Feeldog; Training day menu 2: training with national player Kim Soyeong and Seo Uri
19	August 13, 2013	Badminton	Kang Ho-dong, Lee Soo-geun, Max Changmin, Jo Dal-Hwan, Chansung, John Park, Lee Jong-soo, Feeldog, Lee Mangi Lee Ji-hoon	A Match against Dugu-dong Busan with the new double partners
20-21	August 20, 2013; August 27, 2013	Badminton	Kang Ho-dong, Lee Soo-geun, Max Changmin, Jo Dal-Hwan, Chansung, John Park, Lee Jong-soo, Feeldog, Lee Mangi Lee Ji-hoon	Final game match against Dugu-dong Busan; A day at Taeneung athlete village; Kim Hyun-joong come in place of Max Changmin who's been busy; Training with national athletes and national coaches
22	September 3, 2013	Badminton	Kang Ho-dong, Lee Soo-geun, Max Changmin, Jo Dal-Hwan, Chansung, John Park, Lee Jong-soo, Feeldog, Lee Mangi Lee Ji-hoon	The 4th badminton match against Hwasun, Jeollanam-do
23-24	September 10, 2013; September 17, 2013	Badminton	Kang Ho-dong, Lee Soo-geun, Max Changmin, Jo Dal-Hwan, Chansung, John Park, Lee Jong-soo, Feeldog, Lee Mangi Lee Ji-hoon	The last badminton match in Jeju-do; The last training with badminton legend Park Joo-bong; End badminton without a single win
25-26	September 24, 2013; October 1, 2013	Table tennis	Kang Ho-dong, Lee Soo-geun, Max Changmin, Jo Dal-Hwan, Kim Jae-kyung(Rainbow), Park Seong-ho, Henry Lau	Special 1998 again; Special game with 1988 Olympic table tennis medalist Yoo Nam-kyu, Hyun Jung-hwa, Kim Ki-taik, Kim Wan and London Olympic table tennis costume designer Lie Sang Bong; Cool Kiz Going to Saipan
27	October 8, 2013	Table tennis	Kang Ho-dong, Lee Soo-geun, Max Changmin, Jo Dal-Hwan, Kim Jae-kyung(Rainbow), Park Seong-ho, Lie Sang Bong	Cool Kiz in Saipan; Table tennis match against South Korean in Saipan
28	October 15, 2013	Basketball	Kang Ho-dong, Lee Soo-geun, Max Changmin, John Park, Park Jin-young	Cool Kiz in Saipan; Choosing the next sport by trying Swimming, Tennis, Football and Basketball; The beginning of Basketball
29	October 22, 2013	Basketball	Kang Ho-dong, Lee Soo-geun, Max Changmin, John Park, Park Jin-young, Julien Kang, Seo Ji-seok, Lee Hye-jeong	Made the team with head coach Choi Inseon and coach Woo Jiwon; 1st basketball training
30	October 29, 2013	Basketball	Kang Ho-dong, Lee Soo-geun, Max Changmin, John Park, Park Jin-young, Julien Kang, Seo Ji-seok, Lee Hye-jeong	1st basketball game against Gyeonggi Hanam Women Team (Cool Kiz win the first game by 43-35)
31	November 5, 2013	Basketball	Kang Ho-dong, Lee Soo-geun, Max Changmin, John Park, Park Jin-young, Julien Kang, Seo Ji-seok, Lee Hye-jeong	Mutt Training with Seok Juil; Position interview with the head coach
32	November 12, 2013	Basketball	Kang Ho-dong, Lee Soo-geun, Max Changmin, John Park, Park Jin-young, Julien Kang, Seo Ji-seok, Lee Hye-jeong, Lee Jung-jin	New team member Lee Jung-jin; 2nd basketball match against Changwon Cheongnam team (Cool Kiz Lost by 30-53)
33	November 19, 2013	Basketball	Kang Ho-dong, Max Changmin, John Park, Park Jin-young, Julien Kang, Seo Ji-seok, Lee Hye-jeong, Lee Jung-jin, Kim Hyeok	New team member stage actor Kim Hyeok; Training with student basketball team, level test against school competition champion; Level 1 - Samgwang Elementary School (won by 27-17); Level 2 - Samseon Middle School (Lost by 35-40); Level 3 - Jemulpo High School (Lost by 16-25)
34	November 26, 2013	Basketball	Kang Ho-dong, Max Changmin, John Park, Park Jin-young, Julien Kang, Seo Ji-seok, Lee Hye-jeong, Lee Jung-jin Kim Hyeok	3rd basketball match against Wonju Basketball Mania (won by 44-43)
35	December 3, 2013	Basketball	Kang Ho-dong, Max Changmin, John Park, Park Jin-young, Julien Kang, Seo Ji-seok, Lee Hye-jeong, Lee Jung-jin, Kim Hyeok	BBQ at JYP; A day training with basketball legend Heo Jae and practice game against EGIS team (lost by 5-29)
36	December 10, 2013	Basketball	Kang Ho-dong, Max Changmin, John Park, Park Jin-young, Julien Kang, Seo Ji-seok, Lee Hye-jeong, Lee Jung-jin, Kim Hyeok	4th match against Jeonju BLC Team (won by 45-41); Cool Kiz go to Japan
37	December 17, 2013	Basketball	Kang Ho-dong, Max Changmin, John Park, Park Jin-young, Julien Kang, Seo Ji-seok, Lee Hye-jeong, Lee Jung-jin, Kim Hyeok	International match against Slam Dunk in Japan (won by 58-55)
38	December 24, 2013	Basketball	Kang Ho-dong, Max Changmin, John Park, Park Jin-young, Julien Kang, Seo Ji-seok, Lee Hye-jeong, Lee Jung-jin, Kim Hyeok	Cool Kiz at 2013 KBS Entertainment Awards; Christmas special match against New Kiz - Lee Ji-hoon, Yoon Hyeongbin, Tim, Shin Yongjae, Jo Se-ho, choi Hyeonho, Park Kwangje and Kris with coach Seok Juil (won by 53-43)

=== 2014 ===
List of episodes in 2014

Episode	Airdate	Sport	Team member	Summary
39-40	January 7, 2014; January 14, 2014	Badminton	Kang Ho-dong, Max Changmin, John Park, Chansung Nichkhun Lee Mangi	Badminton returns, all star super match; Blue team Kang Ho-dong, Chansung, Nickhun, Lee Dong-soo, Park Joo-bong and Kim Dong-moon; Red team Max Changmin, John Park, Lee Mangi, Ha Tae-kwon, Lee Yong-dae and Yoo Yeon-seong
41	January 21, 2014	Basketball	Kang Ho-dong, Max Changmin, John Park, Park Jin-young, Julien Kang, Seo Ji-seok, Lee Hye-jeong, Kim Hyeok, Shin Yongjae	New team member Shin Yongjae; 6th basketball match against Daejeon team (lost by 39-45)
42	January 28, 2014	Basketball	Kang Ho-dong, Max Changmin, John Park, Park Jin-young, Julien Kang, Seo Ji-seok, Lee Hye-jeong, Kim Hyeok, Shin Yongjae	Cool Kiz go for field training to Gochang
43	February 4, 2014	Basketball	Kang Ho-dong, Max Changmin, John Park, Park Jin-young, Julien Kang, Seo Ji-seok, Lee Hye-jeong, Kim Hyeok, Shin Yongjae	Last basketball match against Seoul Dynamite (won by 64-62 (OT))
44-45	February 18, 2014; February 25, 2014		Kang Ho-dong	2014 Sochi Winter Olympic Special
46-47	March 4, 2014; March 11, 2014	Taekwondo	Kang Ho-dong, John Park, Julien Kang, Seo Ji-seok, Kim Yeon-woo, Chansung, Hoya (Infinite), Feeldog	The start story of taekwondo; Sorting the application from citizens to train taekwondo together; Applicant audition
48	March 18, 2014	Taekwondo	Kang Ho-dong, John Park, Julien Kang, Seo Ji-seok, Kim Yeon-woo, Chansung, Hoya (Infinite), Feeldog	First taekwondo training with Gyeokpa master Lee Gyuhyeong and Gyeorugi master Jeong Gyukhyeon
49	March 25, 2014	Taekwondo	Kang Ho-dong, John Park, Julien Kang, Seo Ji-seok, Kim Yeon-woo, Chansung, Hoya (Infinite), Feeldog	First Gyeorugi (Sparring) competition against Taegeuk team
50	April 1, 2014	Taekwondo	Kang Ho-dong, John Park, Julien Kang, Seo Ji-seok, Kim Yeon-woo, Chansung, Hoya (Infinite), Feeldog	First Gyeokpa (Breaking) competition against Goryeo team
51	April 8, 2014		Kang Ho-dong, John Park, Seo Ji-seok, Julien Kang, Alex Chu, Lee Byeong-Jin, Chansung, Kim Hyeok, Jo Dal-Hwan, Feeldog, Kim Yeon-woo, Park Seong-ho, Woo Jiwon, Kim Young-chul	1 year anniversary special
52	April 15, 2014	Taekwondo	Kang Ho-dong, John Park, Julien Kang, Seo Ji-seok, Kim Yeon-woo, Chansung, Hoya (Infinite), Feeldog	The last taekwondo story; Gyeorugi competition against New Kiz - Yun Hyeong-bin, Yoon Bo-mi (Apink), Jeong Sihu, Song Ga-yeon, Taemi, Fabien, with Seok Juil and master Lee Dongjun
Special	April 29, 2014	Badminton	Kang Ho-dong, Nichkhun, John Park, Max Changmin, Chansung, Lee Man-gi	Guest: Lee Yong-dae, Yoo Yeon-seong, Park Joo-bong, Kim Dong-moon, Lee Dong-soo, Ha Tae-kwon; Blue team vs Red team; Pairing: Kang Ho-dong & Chansung vs John Park & Max Changmin; Lee Dong-soo & Nichkhun vs Ha Tae-kwon & Lee Man-gi; Park Joo-bong & Kim Dong-moon vs Lee Yong-dae & Yoo Yeon-seong
53	May 6, 2014	Soccer	Kang Ho-dong, Jeong Hyeong-don, Seo Ji-seok, Lee Young-pyo, Lee Jung, Lee Kyou-hyuk, Yoon Doo-joon, Lee Gi-kwang, Jo Ujong, Gu Jamyeong,	First story of football, gathering member for Cool Kiz FC; First try out match against Anyang Technical High School
54	May 13, 2014	Soccer	Kang Ho-dong, Jeong Hyeong-don, Seo Ji-seok, Lee Young-pyo, Lee Jung, Lee Kyou-hyuk, Yoon Doo-joon, Lee Gi-kwang, Jo Ujong, Gu Jamyeong	Try out match against Anyang Technical High School; Training with head coach Lee Deok-hwa and player/coach Lee Young-pyo; Call friends to play a training match
55	May 20, 2014	Soccer	Kang Ho-dong, Jeong Hyeong-don, Seo Ji-seok, Lee Young-pyo, Lee Jung, Lee Kyou-hyuk, Yoon Doo-joon, Lee Gi-kwang, Jo Ujong, Gu Jamyeong,	Training match with friends; Red team - Seo Ji-seok Lee Young-pyo, Lee Jung, Yoon Doo-joon, Lee Gi-kwang, Kim Heungguk, Baek Sung-hyun, Hong Jong-hyun, Minhyeok; Blue team - Kang Ho-dong, Jeong Hyeong-don, Lee Kyou-hyuk, Jo Ujong, Gu Jamyeong, Park Jun-gyu, Minho, Kim Jong-kook
56	May 27, 2014	Soccer	Kang Ho-dong, Jeong Hyeong-don, Seo Ji-seok, Lee Young-pyo, Lee Jung, Lee Kyou-hyuk, Yoon Doo-joon, Lee Gi-kwang, Jo Ujong, Gu Jamyeong, Minho	Scoring practice; A Pink bring them lunch and cheers; First official match against Irwon FC
57	June 3, 2014	Soccer	Kang Ho-dong, Jeong Hyeong-don, Seo Ji-seok, Lee Young-pyo, Lee Jung, Lee Kyou-hyuk, Yoon Doo-joon, Lee Gi-kwang, Jo Ujong, Gu Jamyeong, Minho, Kim Heungguk, Jo Han-sun	Cool Kiz vs World Cup Stars pt.1
58	June 10, 2014	Soccer	Kang Ho-dong, Jeong Hyeong-don, Seo Ji-seok, Lee Jung, Lee Kyou-hyuk, Yoon Doo-joon, Lee Gi-kwang, Gu Jamyeong, Minho, Kim Heungguk, Jo Han-sun	Cool Kiz vs World Cup Stars pt.2; Brazil Special Part 1; Brazil Woman National Team as guest
59	June 17, 2014	Soccer	Kang Ho-dong, Jeong Hyeong-don, Seo Ji-seok, Lee Jung, Lee Kyou-hyuk, Yoon Doo-joon, Lee Gi-kwang, Gu Jamyeong, Minho, Kim Heungguk, Jo Han-sun	Brazil Special Part 2; Training with Brazil Woman National Team
60	June 24, 2014	Soccer	Kang Ho-dong, Jeong Hyeong-don, Seo Ji-seok, Lee Jung, Lee Kyou-hyuk, Yoon Doo-joon, Lee Gi-kwang, Gu Jamyeong, Minho, Kim Heungguk, Jo Han-sun	Brazil Special Part 3
61	July 1, 2014	Soccer	Kang Ho-dong, Jeong Hyeong-don, Seo Ji-seok, Lee Jung, Lee Kyou-hyuk, Yoon Doo-joon, Lee Gi-kwang, Gu Jamyeong, Minho, Kim Heungguk, Jo Han-sun	Brazil Special Part 4; Special event mini sports meet with Koreans in São Paulo; Goalkeeper training with Kim Byung-Ji; Attacking training with Lee Chun-Soo
62	July 8, 2014	Soccer	Kang Ho-dong, Jeong Hyeong-don, Seo Ji-seok, Lee Jung, Lee Kyou-hyuk, Yoon Doo-joon, Lee Gi-kwang, Minho, Kim Heungguk	2nd official match against Ilsoilko FC
63	July 15, 2014	Soccer	Kang Ho-dong, Jeong Hyeong-don, Seo Ji-seok, Lee Jung, Lee Kyou-hyuk, Yoon Doo-joon, Lee Gi-kwang, Minho, Park Hyun-bin, Jo Hangri	Training with Shin Tae-Yong; A match against Gag Concert team Gaebal FC
64	July 22, 2014	Soccer	Kang Ho-dong, Jeong Hyeong-don, Seo Ji-seok, Lee Jung, Lee Kyou-hyuk, Yoon Doo-joon, Lee Gi-kwang, Minho, Lee Wan	Jeong Hyeong-don go to Gag Concert rehearsal as a servant for a day because of losing the last match; Training with Shin Tae-Yong; Cool Kiz vs Doctors
65	July 29, 2014	Soccer	Kang Ho-dong, Jeong Hyeong-don, Seo Ji-seok, Lee Young-pyo, Lee Jung, Lee Kyou-hyuk, Yoon Doo-joon, Lee Gi-kwang, Minho, Jo Ujong, Yang Sang-guk Lee Sigahng, Wonjun	Move up from 8 vs 8 to 11 vs 11 football; Lee Young-pyo came back from Brazil; Cool Kiz vs Pungnyeon FC Gimpo farmer
66	August 5, 2014	Soccer	Kang Ho-dong, Jeong Hyeong-don, Seo Ji-seok, Lee Young-pyo, Lee Jung, Lee Kyou-hyuk, Yoon Doo-joon, Lee Gi-kwang, Minho, Jo Ujong, Yang Sang-guk Lee Sigahng, Wonjun	Physical, set piece raining; Cool Kiz v FC Manager; Ailee 4minute G.NA Sistar B1A4 Beast come to cheer as their managers are playing
67	August 12, 2014	Soccer	Kang Ho-dong, Jeong Hyeong-don, Seo Ji-seok, Lee Young-pyo, Lee Jung, Lee Kyou-hyuk, Yoon Doo-joon, Lee Gi-kwang, Minho, Jo Ujong, Yang Sang-guk Lee Sigahng, Wonjun	Last story of football; Last football match Cool Kiz vs FC Seoul Old Star
68	August 19, 2014	Tennis	Kang Ho-dong, Jeong Hyeong-don, Lee Kyou-hyuk, Yang Sang-guk, Shin Hyun-joon, Sung Si-kyung, Cha Yu-ram, Henry Lau	New sports, tennis; Gathering team members and tennis doubles partners; Kang Ho-dong and Shin Hyun-joon; Jeong Hyeong-don and Sung Si-kyung; Lee Kyou-hyuk and Cha Yu-ram; Yang Sang-guk and Henry Lau; Skill ranking tests
69	August 26, 2014	Tennis	Kang Ho-dong, Jeong Hyeong-don, Lee Kyou-hyuk, Yang Sang-guk, Shin Hyun-joon, Sung Si-kyung, Cha Yu-ram, Henry Lau, Lee Jae-hoon, coach Lee Hyung-taik and coach Jeon Mi-ra	Skill ranking tests; Introducing coach Lee Hyung-taik and coach Jeon Mi-ra
70-71	September 9, 2014; September 16, 2014	Tennis	Kang Ho-dong, Jeong Hyeong-don, Lee Kyou-hyuk, Yang Sang-guk, Shin Hyun-joon, Sung Si-kyung, Cha Yu-ram, Lee Jae-hoon, coach Lee Hyung-taik and coach Jeon Mi-ra	First official game against Suwon tennis club; Training with national tennis team; Double partner popularity vote
72	September 23, 2014	Tennis	Kang Ho-dong, Jeong Hyeong-don, Lee Kyou-hyuk, Yang Sang-guk, Shin Hyun-joon, Sung Si-kyung, Cha Yu-ram, Lee Jae-hoon, coach Lee Hyung-taik and coach Jeon Mi-ra	Training with Yoon Raik, coach Jeon Mi-ra son; Training match with Seoul Hongyeon Elementary School
73-74	September 30, 2014; October 7, 2014	Tennis	Kang Ho-dong, Jeong Hyeong-don, Lee Kyou-hyuk, Yang Sang-guk, Shin Hyun-joon, Sung Si-kyung, Cha Yu-ram, Lee Jae-hoon, coach Lee Hyung-taik and coach Jeon Mi-ra	Training in Gunsan; 2nd official match against Gunsan tennis club; Training with Naeheung Elementary School
75	October 14, 2014	Tennis	Kang Ho-dong, Jeong Hyeong-don, Lee Kyou-hyuk, Yang Sang-guk, Shin Hyun-joon, Sung Si-kyung, Cha Yu-ram, Lee Jae-hoon, Sung Hyuk, Lee Gwangyong, coach Lee Hyung-taik and coach Jeon Mi-ra	New team members; Training with National Women OB Team
76-77	October 21, 2014; October 28, 2014	Tennis	Kang Ho-dong, Jeong Hyeong-don, Lee Kyou-hyuk, Yang Sang-guk, Shin Hyun-joon, Sung Si-kyung, Cha Yu-ram, Lee Jae-hoon, Sung Hyuk, Lee Gwangyong, coach Lee Hyung-taik and coach Jeon Mi-ra	Official match against Chuncheon Tennis Club
78	November 4, 2014	Tennis	Kang Ho-dong, Jeong Hyeong-don, Lee Kyou-hyuk, Yang Sang-guk, Shin Hyun-joon, Sung Si-kyung, Cha Yu-ram, Lee Jae-hoon, Sung Hyuk, Lee Gwangyong, coach Lee Hyung-taik and coach Jeon Mi-ra	Training match with Lee Hwi-jae and Song Euni
79-80	November 11, 2014; November 18, 2014	Tennis	Kang Ho-dong, Jeong Hyeong-don, Lee Kyou-hyuk, Yang Sang-guk, Shin Hyun-joon, Sung Si-kyung, Cha Yu-ram, Lee Jae-hoon, Sung Hyuk, Lee Gwangyong, coach Lee Hyung-taik and coach Jeon Mi-ra	Guerilla tennis match at Mokdong and Hangang; Each team can go home after they win a match
81	November 25, 2014	Tennis	Kang Ho-dong, Jeong Hyeong-don, Lee Kyou-hyuk, Yang Sang-guk, Shin Hyun-joon, Sung Si-kyung, Cha Yu-ram, Lee Jae-hoon, Sung Hyuk, Lee Gwangyong, coach Lee Hyung-taik and coach Jeon Mi-ra	Cool Kiz vs Global Foreigner Team
82-83	December 2, 2014; December 9, 2014	Tennis	Kang Ho-dong, Jeong Hyeong-don, Lee Kyou-hyuk, Yang Sang-guk, Shin Hyun-joon, Sung Si-kyung, Cha Yu-ram, Lee Jae-hoon, Sung Hyuk, Lee Gwangyong, coach Lee Hyung-taik and coach Jeon Mi-ra	Cool Kiz Tennis Membership Training; Training match 10 – 100 against the coaches
84	December 16, 2014	Tennis	Kang Ho-dong, Jeong Hyeong-don, Lee Kyou-hyuk, Yang Sang-guk, Shin Hyun-joon, Sung Si-kyung, Cha Yu-ram, Lee Jae-hoon, Sung Hyuk, Lee Gwangyong, coach Lee Hyung-taik and coach Jeon Mi-ra	Training with Ucheon Elementary School; Cool Kiz vs Hoengsoeng Tennis Club
85	December 23, 2014	Tennis	Kang Ho-dong, Jeong Hyeong-don, Lee Kyou-hyuk, Yang Sang-guk, Shin Hyun-joon, Sung Si-kyung, Cha Yu-ram, Lee Jae-hoon, Sung Hyuk, Lee Gwangyong, coach Lee Hyung-taik and coach Jeon Mi-ra	Cool Kiz vs Yoon Jong-shin family and Kim Yeon-woo
86	December 30, 2014	Tennis	Kang Ho-dong, Jeong Hyeong-don, Lee Kyou-hyuk, Yang Sang-guk, Shin Hyun-joon, Sung Si-kyung, Cha Yu-ram, Lee Jae-hoon, Sung Hyuk, Lee Gwangyong, coach Lee Hyung-taik and coach Jeon Mi-ra	Training match 10 – 100 against 2014 Asian Games Gold Medalist Lim Yong-kyu and Chung Hyeon

=== 2015 ===
List of episodes in 2015

Episode	Airdate	Sport	Team member	Summary
87-89	January 6, 2015; January 13, 2015; January 20, 2015	Tennis	Kang Ho-dong, Jeong Hyeong-don, Lee Kyou-hyuk, Yang Sang-guk, Shin Hyun-joon, Sung Si-kyung, Cha Yu-ram, Lee Jae-hoon, Sung Hyuk, Lee Gwangyong, coach Lee Hyung-taik and coach Jeon Mi-ra	National Competition with amateur contestant from all across the nation
90	January 27, 2015	Foot Volleyball	Kang Ho-dong, Jeong Hyeong-don, Yang Sang-guk, Hong Kyung-min, Ahn Jung-hwan, Baro, Samuel Okyere, Lee Kyu-han	New sports, foot volleyball; Meeting the new members; Introducing foot volleyball with the national team
91	February 3, 2015	Foot Volleyball	Kang Ho-dong, Jeong Hyeong-don, Yang Sang-guk, Hong Kyung-min, Ahn Jung-hwan, Baro, Samuel Okyere, Lee Kyu-han	Meeting Jeong Hyeong-don old colleagues at his former employer; First official match against Samsung Electronics Team
92	February 10, 2015	Foot Volleyball	Kang Ho-dong, Jeong Hyeong-don, Yang Sang-guk, Hong Kyung-min, Ahn Jung-hwan, Baro, Samuel Okyere, Lee Kyu-han	Training with friends, each member bring their friend to train with; Training match 2 on 2, cast member & friend, the loser pay for the meals; Hong Kyung-min & Cha Tae-hyun; Samuel Okyere & Samuel Hammington; Lee Kyu-han & Kim Ki-bang; Kang Ho-dong & Kim Byung-Ji; Ahn Jung-hwan & Yun Minsu; Baro & Yuk Jung-wan; Jeong Hyeong-don and Yang Sang-guk play on 3 on 3 final match
93	February 17, 2015	Foot Volleyball	Kang Ho-dong, Jeong Hyeong-don, Yang Sang-guk, Hong Kyung-min, Ahn Jung-hwan, Baro, Samuel Okyere, Lee Kyu-han	Training match against each other, the loser will have to run marathon; Orange team - Jeong Hyeong-don, Hong Kyung-min, Cha Tae-hyun, Samuel Okyere, Samuel Hammington, Lee Kyu-han, Kim Ki-bang; Blue team - Kang Ho-dong, Kim Byung-Ji, Ahn Jung-hwan, Yun Minsu, Baro, Yuk Jung-wan, Yang Sang-guk
94	February 24, 2015	Foot Volleyball	Kang Ho-dong, Jeong Hyeong-don, Yang Sang-guk, Hong Kyung-min, Ahn Jung-hwan, Baro, Cha Tae-hyun	Second official match against Giljokhoe Women's Team
95	March 3, 2015	Foot Volleyball	Kang Ho-dong, Jeong Hyeong-don, Yang Sang-guk, Hong Kyung-min, Ahn Jung-hwan, Baro, Samuel Okyere, Lee Kyu-han, Cha Tae-hyun	Revenge match against each other, the loser will have to climb Bukhansan; Blue team - Jeong Hyeong-don, Hong Kyung-min, Cha Tae-hyun, Samuel Okyere, Lee Kyu-han; Red team - Kang Ho-dong, Ahn Jung-hwan, Baro, Yang Sang-guk
96	March 10, 2015	Foot Volleyball	Kang Ho-dong, Jeong Hyeong-don, Yang Sang-guk, Hong Kyung-min, Ahn Jung-hwan, Baro, Samuel Okyere, Lee Kyu-han, Cha Tae-hyun	Cool Kiz play against Army members; Special performance by girl group, EXID
97	March 17, 2015	Foot Volleyball	Kang Ho-dong, Jeong Hyeong-don, Yang Sang-guk, Hong Kyung-min, Ahn Jung-hwan, Baro, Samuel Okyere, Lee Kyu-han, Cha Tae-hyun	Members play against elementary, middle, and high school students; Members play against the Cool Kiz staff dream team
98	March 24, 2015	Foot Volleyball	Kang Ho-dong, Jeong Hyeong-don, Yang Sang-guk, Hong Kyung-min, Ahn Jung-hwan, Baro, Samuel Okyere, Lee Kyu-han	One on one match between Hyeong-don and Jung-hwan; Loser has to wear pink tights in next match; Match against a several generational family
99-100	March 31, 2015; April 7, 2015	Foot Volleyball	Kang Ho-dong, Jeong Hyeong-don, Yang Sang-guk, Hong Kyung-min, Ahn Jung-hwan, Baro	Foot Volleyball auditions; Seo Ji-seok, Park Gun-hyung, Baro, Lee Hyung-taik, Yun Gi-won, Yun Jeong-su
101-102	April 14, 2015; April 21, 2015	Basketball	Kang Ho-dong, Jeong Hyeong-don, Samuel Okyere, Jeong Jinwoon, Kim Hyeok, Seo Ji-seok, Julien Kang, Park Jin-young	Basketball returns with reenactment between Yonsei University and Korea University basketball stars from the 90's
103	April 28, 2015	Foot Volleyball	Kang Ho-dong, Jeong Hyeong-don, Yang Sang-guk, Hong Kyung-min, Ahn Jung-hwan, Baro, Samuel Okyere, Lee Kyu-han, Seo Ji-seok	Cool Kiz against Cheongju University soccer team with guest Lee Eul-yong as their coach
104	May 5, 2015	Foot Volleyball	Kang Ho-dong, Jeong Hyeong-don, Yang Sang-guk, Hong Kyung-min, Ahn Jung-hwan, Baro, Samuel Okyere, Lee Kyu-han, Seo Ji-seok	Sam's housewarming with the members; Match against the Best Stunt Team
105	May 12, 2015	Foot Volleyball	Kang Ho-dong, Jeong Hyeong-don, Yang Sang-guk, Hong Kyung-min, Baro, Samuel Okyere, Lee Kyu-han, Seo Ji-seok	Ordering of uniforms; Match against a Musical team with Park Gun-hyung and Oh Man-seok
106	May 19, 2015	Foot Volleyball	Kang Ho-dong, Jeong Hyeong-don, Yang Sang-guk, Hong Kyung-min, Ahn Jung-hwan, Baro, Samuel Okyere, Lee Kyu-han, Seo Ji-seok	Match against the Baegam Hot Spring team
107	May 26, 2015	Foot Volleyball	Kang Ho-dong, Jeong Hyeong-don, Yang Sang-guk, Hong Kyung-min, Ahn Jung-hwan, Baro, Samuel Okyere, Lee Kyu-han, Seo Ji-seok	The National Foot Volleyball Competition
108	June 2, 2015	Cycling	Kang Ho-dong, Jeong Hyeong-don, Kim Min-jun, Seo Ji-seok, Oh Sang-jin Kim Hye-seong Sean (Jinusean), Julian Quintart	New sport, cycling; Recruitment of possible cycling members; Park Myeong-su, Cha Tae-hyun, Jessi (rapper), Kim Min-jun, Sean (Jinusean); Basic Fitness test with Park Sung-baek
109	June 9, 2015	Cycling	Kang Ho-dong, Jeong Hyeong-don, Kim Min-jun, Seo Ji-seok, Oh Sang-jin Kim Hye-seong Sean (Jinusean), Julian Quintart	Cycle training with Coach Park Sung-baek and Coach Gong Hyo-suk
110-111	June 16, 2015; June 23, 2015	Cycling	Kang Ho-dong, Jeong Hyeong-don, Kim Min-jun, Seo Ji-seok, Oh Sang-jin Kim Hye-seong Sean (Jinusean), Julian Quintart, Park Sung-baek, Gong Hyo-suk	The members will ride 135.7 km from Yeosu to Gangjin
112	June 30, 2015	Foot Volleyball	Kang Ho-dong, Jeong Hyeong-don, Yang Sang-guk, Hong Kyung-min, Ahn Jung-hwan, Baro, Samuel Okyere, Seo Ji-seok	Another National Foot Volleyball Competition
113	July 7, 2015	Swimming	Kang Ho-dong, Jeong Hyeong-don, Seo Ji-seok, Sean (Jinusean), Kang Min-hyuk, Kwon Yu-ri	New sport, swimming; Audition for swimming ace; Lee Jae-yoon, Sam Hammington, Sung Hoon, Kim Hyung-Jung, Shownu, Choi Phillip, Kang Ji-sub, Robin Deiana, Han Seok-joon, Lee Yi-kyung
114	July 14, 2015	Swimming	Kang Ho-dong, Jeong Hyeong-don, Seo Ji-seok, Sean (Jinusean), Kwon Yu-ri, Sung Hoon, Shownu	Special guest: Cha Tae-hyun; First official training with Coaches Choi Yun-hui, Yoo Jung-nam, and Ryu Yoon-ji
115	July 21, 2015	Swimming	Kang Ho-dong, Jeong Hyeong-don, Seo Ji-seok, Sean (Jinusean), Kwon Yu-ri, Sung Hoon, Choi Yun-hui, Yoo Jung-nam, Ryu Yoon-ji	Guest: Hani; A competition against Yeonchon Elementary School
116	July 28, 2015	Swimming	Kang Ho-dong, Jeong Hyeong-don, Seo Ji-seok, Sean (Jinusean), Kwon Yu-ri, Sung Hoon, Kang Min-hyuk, Choi Yun-hui, Yoo Jung-nam, Ryu Yoon-ji	Cool Kiz competition against the Global Team; Julien Kang, Robin Deiana, Fabien (model), Ryohei Otani, Jackson Wang, Julian Quintart, Sam Hammington
117	August 4, 2015	Swimming	Kang Ho-dong, Jeong Hyeong-don, Seo Ji-seok, Sean (Jinusean), Kwon Yu-ri, Sung Hoon, Kang Min-hyuk, Choi Yun-hui, Yoo Jung-nam, Ryu Yoon-ji	New member, Lee Jae-yoon; Third match against 3-generation Namyangju Team
118	August 11, 2015	Swimming	Kang Ho-dong, Jeong Hyeong-don, Seo Ji-seok, Sean (Jinusean), Kwon Yu-ri, Sung Hoon, Kang Min-hyuk, Choi Yun-hui, Yoo Jung-nam, Ryu Yoon-ji, Lee Jae-yoon	Guest: Eun Ji-won and swimmer Lee Ho-joon; Fourth match against Sea Special Attack Team (SSAT)
119	August 18, 2015	Swimming	Kang Ho-dong, Jeong Hyeong-don, Seo Ji-seok, Sean (Jinusean), Kwon Yu-ri, Sung Hoon, Kang Min-hyuk, Choi Yun-hui, Yoo Jung-nam, Ryu Yoon-ji, Lee Jae-yoon, Eun Ji-won	Yoga with Yuri; Fifth official match against celebrity team; Neil (Ahn Daniel), Kim Se-yeong, Li Wenhan (Uniq), Seean, Kevin Woo
120	August 25, 2015	Swimming	Kang Ho-dong, Jeong Hyeong-don, Seo Ji-seok, Sean (Jinusean), Kwon Yu-ri, Sung Hoon, Kang Min-hyuk, Choi Yun-hui, Yoo Jung-nam, Ryu Yoon-ji, Lee Jae-yoon, Eun Ji-won	Outdoor training; Guest Jo Se-ho; Six official match against TIMCO
121	September 1, 2015	Swimming	Kang Ho-dong, Jeong Hyeong-don, Seo Ji-seok, Sean (Jinusean), Kwon Yu-ri, Sung Hoon, Kang Min-hyuk, Choi Yun-hui, Yoo Jung-nam, Ryu Yoon-ji, Lee Jae-yoon, Eun Ji-won	Training with finswimmer, Jang Ye-sol; Seventh official match against Hidden Swimmers
122	September 8, 2015	Swimming	Kang Ho-dong, Jeong Hyeong-don, Seo Ji-seok, Sean (Jinusean), Kwon Yu-ri, Sung Hoon, Kang Min-hyuk, Choi Yun-hui, Yoo Jung-nam, Ryu Yoon-ji, Lee Jae-yoon, Eun Ji-won	Guest: Hong Seok-cheon; Special training with Jo Hyun-joo; Eighth official match against a Siblings' team
123-124	September 15, 2015; September 22, 2015	Swimming	Kang Ho-dong, Jeong Hyeong-don, Seo Ji-seok, Sean (Jinusean), Kwon Yu-ri, Sung Hoon, Kang Min-hyuk, Choi Yun-hui, Yoo Jung-nam, Ryu Yoon-ji, Lee Jae-yoon, Eun Ji-won	The Cool Kiz swimming festival; Black team: Sam Hammington, Robin Deiana, Ryohei Otani, Jackson Wang, Julian Quintart, Seean, Li Wenhan (Uniq); Green team: Hong Jin-ho, Kyungil (History (band), Kim Hyungjoong, Kim Seyeong, Jeong Seong-yun, Yein, Kim Min-kyu; Blue team: Hwang Seongung, Shownu, Kevin Woo, Lee Yi-kyung, Lee Sangmin, Park Minha (Nine Muses (band))
125	October 6, 2015	Judo	Kang Ho-dong, Jeong Hyeong-don, Lee Jong-Hyun, Lee Hoon, Lee Jae-yoon, Go Se-won	New sport, Judo; Introduction of coaches: Lee Won-hee, Cho Jun-ho
126	October 13, 2015	Judo	Kang Ho-dong, Lee Jong-Hyun, Lee Hoon, Lee Jae-yoon, Go Se-won, Lee Won-hee, Cho Jun-ho	Sung Si-kyung replaces Jeong Hyeong-don for the day; Special Training with Judo Heroines; Cho Min-sun and Kim Mi-jung
127	October 27, 2015	Judo	Kang Ho-dong, Jeong Hyeong-don, Lee Jong-Hyun, Lee Hoon, Lee Jae-yoon, Go Se-won, Lee Won-hee, Cho Jun-ho, Kim Young-ho	First official match against Boseong Middle School Judo club
128-129	November 3, 2015; November 10, 2015	Judo	Kang Ho-dong, Jeong Hyeong-don, Lee Jong-Hyun, Lee Hoon, Lee Jae-yoon, Go Se-won, Lee Won-hee, Cho Jun-ho, Kim Young-ho	Special Guest Byun Baek-hyun; Second official match against Big Blue judo club from Geoje
130	November 17, 2015	Judo	Kang Ho-dong, Jeong Hyeong-don, Lee Jong-Hyun, Lee Hoon, Lee Jae-yoon, Go Se-won, Lee Won-hee, Cho Jun-ho, Kim Young-ho	Self Defense Skills taught with Park Cho-rong(Apink), Yuju, Na Hae-ryung and Kim Sook; Third official match against Bucheon Judo Gym
131	November 24, 2015	Judo	Kang Ho-dong, Jeong Hyeong-don, Lee Hoon, Lee Jae-yoon, Go Se-won, Kim Young-ho	The First Judo Audition; Choi Min, Jota (Madtown), Noh Hyun-tae, David No, Im Ho-geol, Hwang Sung-woong, Hangzoo (Rhythm Power), Shin Young-jin
132	December 1, 2015	Judo	Kang Ho-dong, Jeong Hyeong-don, Lee Hoon, Lee Jae-yoon, Go Se-won, Kim Young-ho, Lee Won-hee, Cho Jun-ho, Jota (Madtown)	Meeting of Coach Cho's family; Fourth official match against students from Korea University, Hanyang University and Dongguk University
133	December 1, 2015	Judo	Kang Ho-dong, Jeong Hyeong-don, Lee Hoon, Lee Jae-yoon, Go Se-won, Kim Young-ho, Lee Won-hee, Cho Jun-ho, Jota (Madtown)	The Selection of the Korean National Team; Fifth official match in Yeosu
134-135	December 8, 2015; December 15, 2015	Judo	Kang Ho-dong, Lee Hoon, Lee Jae-yoon, Go Se-won, Lee Won-hee, Cho Jun-ho, Jota (Madtown)	The National Judo competition; Results: Gold medal: Jota (- 73 kg); Bronze medal: Lee Jae-yoon (- 81 kg), Lee Hoon (- 81 kg), Kang Ho-dong (+ 90 kg)
136	December 22, 2015	Judo	Kang Ho-dong, Lee Hoon, Lee Jae-yoon, Go Se-won, Lee Won-hee, Cho Jun-ho, Jota(Madtown)	Two new members, Im Ho-geol and Hangzoo (Rhythm Power); The sixth official match against the Entertainment Team, which includes Coach Cho's youngest brother, Jun-hwi
137	December 29, 2015	Judo	Kang Ho-dong, Lee Hoon, Lee Jae-yoon, Go Se-won, Lee Won-hee, Cho Jun-ho, Jota (Madtown), Im Ho-geol, Hangzoo (Rhythm Power)	Special training with Song Dae-nam and Choi Min-ho; Seventh official match against prison guards from Anyang

=== 2016 ===
List of episodes in 2016

Episode	Airdate	Sport	Team member	Summary
138	January 5, 2016	Judo	Kang Ho-dong, Lee Hoon, Lee Jae-yoon, Go Se-won, Lee Won-hee, Cho Jun-ho, Jota (Madtown), Im Ho-geol, Hangzoo (Rhythm Power)	Cool Kiz vs Women's National Team
139	January 12, 2016	Judo	Kang Ho-dong, Lee Hoon, Lee Jae-yoon, Go Se-won, Lee Won-hee, Cho Jun-ho, Jota (Madtown), Im Ho-geol, Hangzoo (Rhythm Power)	National Judo Tour; Visit Jota's alumni Dongji Highschool; Eight official match against Gyeongsang-do team
140	January 19, 2016	Judo	Kang Ho-dong, Lee Hoon, Lee Jae-yoon, Go Se-won, Lee Won-hee, Cho Jun-ho, Jota (Madtown), Im Ho-geol, Hangzoo (Rhythm Power)	Cool Kiz go against Coach Lee in a 1 vs 5; Ninth official match against Gangwon-do team
141	January 26, 2016	Judo	Kang Ho-dong, Lee Hoon, Lee Jae-yoon, Go Se-won, Lee Won-hee, Cho Jun-ho, Jota (Madtown), Im Ho-geol, Hangzoo (Rhythm Power)	Visit to Kim Young-ho's place; Final official match against Chungcheong-do team
142	February 2, 2016	Judo	Kang Ho-dong, Lee Hoon, Lee Jae-yoon, Lee Won-hee, Cho Jun-ho, Jota (Madtown), Go Se-won, Im Ho-geol, Hangzoo (Rhythm Power)	Judo All-Star competition part 1; Cho Jun-hyun, Kim Jae-Bum, Jeon Ki-young, Song Dae-nam, Choi Min-ho, Kim Mi-jung, Cho Min-sun, Jung Bu-kyung, Jang Sung-ho, Kim Ji-yoon, Kim Seong-yeon
Seollal; Special	February 9, 2016	Judo	Kang Ho-dong, Lee Jae-yoon, Jota (Madtown), Go Se-won, Im Ho-geol, Hangzoo (Rhythm Power)	Seollal Special; Flashback of Jota's matches
143	February 16, 2016	Judo	Kang Ho-dong, Lee Hoon, Lee Jae-yoon, Lee Won-hee, Cho Jun-ho, Jota (Madtown), Go Se-won, Im Ho-geol, Hangzoo (Rhythm Power)	Judo All-Star competition part 2; Cho Jun-hyun, Kim Jae-Bum, Jeon Ki-young, Song Dae-nam, Choi Min-ho, Kim Mi-jung, Cho Min-sun, Jung Bu-kyung, Jang Sung-ho, Kim Ji-yoon, Kim Seong-yeon
144-145	February 23, 2016; March 1, 2016	Table Tennis	Kang Ho-dong	Table Tennis Match of legends and celebrities; Oh Man-seok, Lee Jong-beom, Jo Dong-hyuk, Kang Kyun-sung, Jo Dal-hwan, Yoo Jae-hwan, Son Dong-woon, Yoon Bo-mi (Apink)
146	March 8, 2016	Volleyball	Kang Ho-dong, Oh Man-seok, Jota, Kangnam, Lee Jae-yoon, Jo Dong-hyuk, Ryohei Otani, Yang Hak-jin	The 11th Sport, Volleyball.; The First Meeting With The New Members and Coach, Kim Se-jin
147	March 15, 2016	Volleyball	Kang Ho-dong, Oh Man-seok, Jota, Kangnam, Lee Jae-yoon, Jo Dong-hyuk, Ryohei Otani, Yang Hak-jin, Kim Se-jin	Volleyball positions given out; Practice with volleyball legends; Park Hee-sang, Ma Nak-gil, and Choi Cheon-sik
148	March 22, 2016	Volleyball	Kang Ho-dong, Oh Man-seok, Jota, Kangnam, Lee Jae-yoon, Jo Dong-hyuk, Ryohei Otani, Yang Hak-jin, Kim Se-jin	First official match against Jinju Gyeonghae Girls' Middle School Volleyball team
149	March 29, 2016	Volleyball	Kang Ho-dong, Oh Man-seok, Jota, Kangnam, Lee Jae-yoon, Jo Dong-hyuk, Ryohei Otani, Yang Hak-jin, Kim Se-jin	Second official match against Nine Bridge Women's Volleyball team
150	April 5, 2016	Volleyball	Kang Ho-dong, Oh Man-seok, Jota, Lee Jae-yoon, Jo Dong-hyuk, Ryohei Otani, Yang Hak-jin	Cool Kiz best friends come to decide additional player; Joon Park, Jung Sang-hoon, Sleepy, Jun Hyun-moo; Third official match against Goesan County Volleyball team; Guest Coach for the match is Park Hee-sang
151	April 12, 2016	Volleyball	Kang Ho-dong, Oh Man-seok, Jota, Kangnam, Lee Jae-yoon, Jo Dong-hyuk, Ryohei Otani, Yang Hak-jin, Kim Se-jin, Sleepy	Practice with Female All-Star Volleyball players; Fourth official match against Bucheon Volleyball team; Lee Go Eun, Han Song Yi, Kim Hae Ran, Kim Hye Jin, Chae Seon Ah, Ko Ye Rin and Lee Da Yeong
152	April 19, 2016	Volleyball	Kang Ho-dong, Oh Man-seok, Jota, Kangnam, Lee Jae-yoon, Jo Dong-hyuk, Ryohei Otani, Yang Hak-jin, Kim Se-jin, Sleepy	Practice with Male All-Star Volleyball players; Moon Sung Min, Kim Yo Han, Han Sun Soo, Ji Tae Hwan, Choi Hong Suk, Jun Gwang In and Song Myun Geun
153	April 26, 2016	Volleyball	Kang Ho-dong, Oh Man-seok, Jota, Kangnam, Lee Jae-yoon, Jo Dong-hyuk, Ryohei Otani, Yang Hak-jin, Kim Se-jin, Sleepy	Guest Kim Mi-sook; Fifth official match against Cheonan Morning Volleyball Team
154	May 3, 2016	Volleyball	Kang Ho-dong, Oh Man-seok, Jota, Kangnam, Lee Jae-yoon, Jo Dong-hyuk, Ryohei Otani, Yang Hak-jin, Kim Se-jin, Sleepy	Sixth official match against Celebrities; Ma Nak-gil, Park Gi-ryang, Oh Se-deuk, Lee Min-hyuk, Bora, Kim Il-joong, Hwang Min, Shin Hyun-soo, Goo Gyo-ik, Jin Hae-sung, Choi Hyun-jin
155	May 10, 2016	Volleyball	Kang Ho-dong, Oh Man-seok, Jota, Kangnam, Lee Jae-yoon, Jo Dong-hyuk, Ryohei Otani, Yang Hak-jin, Kim Se-jin, Sleepy	Guest: Kim So-hyun; Seventh official match against Seoul National University
156	May 17, 2016	Volleyball	Kang Ho-dong, Oh Man-seok, Jota, Kangnam, Lee Jae-yoon, Jo Dong-hyuk, Ryohei Otani, Yang Hak-jin, Kim Se-jin, Sleepy	Guest: Onew; Eighth official match against Itaewon High Flyers
157	May 24, 2016	Volleyball	Kang Ho-dong, Oh Man-seok, Jota, Kangnam, Lee Jae-yoon, Jo Dong-hyuk, Ryohei Otani, Yang Hak-jin, Kim Se-jin, Sleepy	Match with volleyball legends; Chang Yoon-hee, Choi Tae-woong, Shin Jin-sik, Who In-jung, Im Do-hun, Kim Sang-woo, Park Hee-sang
158	May 31, 2016	Volleyball	Kang Ho-dong, Oh Man-seok, Jota, Kangnam, Lee Jae-yoon, Ryohei Otani, Yang Hak-jin, Kim Se-jin, Sleepy	Guest: Hong Jin-young; National Volleyball Tour Part 1 against Gwangju Blue Wings Volleyball Team; New member, Gu Gyo-ik
159	June 7, 2016	Volleyball	Kang Ho-dong, Oh Man-seok, Jota, Kangnam, Lee Jae-yoon, Jo Dong-hyuk, Ryohei Otani, Yang Hak-jin, Kim Se-jin, Sleepy, Gu Gyo-ik	Guest: EXID; National Volleyball Tour Part 2 in Haeundae against Busan Shingu Volleyball Team
160	June 14, 2016	Volleyball	Kang Ho-dong, Oh Man-seok, Jota, Kangnam, Lee Jae-yoon, Jo Dong-hyuk, Ryohei Otani, Yang Hak-jin, Kim Se-jin, Sleepy, Gu Gyo-ik	Guest: Monsta X; Special coach, Shin Jin-sik for revenge match; National Volleyball Tour Part 3 against Gangneung Volleyball Team
161	June 21, 2016	Volleyball	Kang Ho-dong, Oh Man-seok, Jota, Kangnam, Lee Jae-yoon, Jo Dong-hyuk, Ryohei Otani, Yang Hak-jin, Kim Se-jin, Sleepy, Gu Gyo-ik	Guest: Jun Hyo-seong; Membership Training in Chungcheong to strengthen Cool Kiz teamwork; Last part of the National Volleyball Tour against Sejong V Club; Team Cool Kiz ends their losing streaks
162	June 28, 2016	Volleyball	Kang Ho-dong, Oh Man-seok, Jota, Kangnam, Lee Jae-yoon, Jo Dong-hyuk, Ryohei Otani, Yang Hak-jin, Kim Se-jin, Sleepy, Gu Gyo-ik	Guest: World-class volleyball star Kim Yeon-koung; Special training for the Cool Kiz; National Volleyball Tournament Part 1, preliminaries
163	July 5, 2016	Volleyball	Kang Ho-dong, Oh Man-seok, Jota, Kangnam, Lee Jae-yoon, Jo Dong-hyuk, Ryohei Otani, Yang Hak-jin, Kim Se-jin, Sleepy, Gu Gyo-ik	National Volleyball Tournament Part 2, finales; Last story of volleyball
164-165	July 12, 2016; July 19, 2016	Badminton	Kang Ho-dong, Oh Man-seok, Nichkhun, Jae Park (Day6), Lee Soo-geun	Celebrities & Legends Badminton Double Tournament; Special appearance by South Korea Badminton Players for Olympics, Men's Double: Lee Yeong Dae and Yoo Yeon-Seung at Episode 164; Guest: Jung Jae-sung, Lee Dong-soo, Hong Seo-beom, Ha Tae-kwon, Kim Jin-woo, Shon Seung-mo, Lee Hyo-jung, Lee Jae-jin, Choi Hyun-seok, Hwang Ji-man, Kim Dong-jun (ZE:A); Pairing : Kang Ho-dong & Jung Jae-sung; Lee Dong-soo & Hong Seo-beom; Ha Tae-kwon & Kim Jin-woo; Lee Soo-geun & Shon Seung-mo; Oh Man-seok & Lee Hyo-jung; Lee Jae-jin & Choi Hyun-seok; Hwang Ji-man & Kim Dong-jun (ZE:A); Nichkhun & Jae Park (Day6)
166-167	July 26, 2016; August 2, 2016	Wrestling	Kang Ho-dong, Lee Soo-geun, Jota, Kangnam, Yoon Hyung-bin, Seo Dong-won (Actor), Nam Yui-chul, Lee Seung-yun (Comedian), Daewon (OFFROAD)	Celebrity Wrestling Tournament; Guest: Park Eun-chul, Jung Ji-hyun, Sim Kwon-ho, Kim Hyeon-woo, Ryu Han-Su, Lee Jeong-baek
168	August 23, 2016	Judo	Kang Ho-dong, Lee Soo-geun, Jota, Go Se-won, Park Sang-chul, Im Ho-geol, Hangzoo (Rhythm Power)	Celebrity Judo Tournament pt.1; Guest: Cho Min-sun, Cho Jun-hyun, Jung Bu-kyung, Shin Seung-hwan, Seo Dong-won, Sung Jin-woo, Hwang Ye-sul, Choi Min, Jin Hae-sung, Kim Min-soo; Special Match: Jota vs Jin Hae-sung; Jota vs Seo Dong-won
169	August 30, 2016		Kang Ho-dong, Lee Soo-geun, Kim Young-chul, Sol Bi	2016 Rio Olympic special; Guest: Park Sang-young, Chang Hye-jin, Ku Bon-chan, Jeong Bo-kyeong, Kim Jong-hyun, Choi Byung-chul
170	September 6, 2016	Judo	Kang Ho-dong, Lee Soo-geun, Jota, Go Se-won, Park Sang-chul, Im Ho-geol, Hangzoo (Rhythm Power)	Celebrity Judo Tournament pt.2; Guest: Cho Min-sun, Cho Jun-hyun, Jung Bu-kyung, Shin Seung-hwan, Seo Dong-won, Sung Jin-woo, Hwang Ye-sul, Choi Min, Jin Hae-sung, Kim Min-soo
171	September 13, 2016	Archery	Kang Ho-dong, Lee Soo-geun, Lee Kyu-han, Jun Hyo-seong, Choi Jung-won, Lee Si-young	The 12th Sport, Archery.; The First Meeting With The New Members and 2016 Rio Olympic Gold Medalists: Chang Hye-jin, Choi Mi-sun, Lee Seung-yun, Kim Woo-jin and Ku Bon-chan
172	September 20, 2016	Archery	Kang Ho-dong, Lee Soo-geun, Lee Kyu-han, Jun Hyo-seong, Choi Jung-won, Lee Si-young	Learning Basic Archery & First Training with Coach Jang Yeong-sol
173	September 27, 2016	Archery	Kang Ho-dong, Lee Soo-geun, Lee Kyu-han, Jun Hyo-seong, Choi Jung-won, Lee Si-young	First Match vs EXID; Second Match vs Kids Team
174	October 4, 2016	Archery	Kang Ho-dong, Lee Soo-geun, Lee Kyu-han, Jun Hyo-seong, Choi Jung-won, Lee Si-young	2016 Archery Festival; Team Tournament; Cool Kiz A: Lee Soo-geun, Lee Kyu-han, Jun Hyo-seong; Cool Kiz B: Kang Ho-dong, Choi Jung-won, Lee Si-young; Singer Team: CNU (B1A4), John Park, Tzuyu (Twice); Sport Team: Woo Ji-won, Choi Byung-chul, Shin Soo-ji; World Team: Zhang Yu'an, Robin Deiana, Sam Okyere; Individual Tournament; Cool Kiz Final Episode

== Ratings ==
Ratings are based on the Live airing of 우리동네 예체능 on KBS2 on Tuesday 11.10pm kst. (Cool Kiz on the block which airs the English subbed version on KBSWorld TV on Tuesday 11.15pm airs 2 episodes late)

List of ratings in 2013 (episode 01–38)

Date	Episode	Nationwide	
Date	Episode	TNmS	AGB
April 9, 2013	1 (Note: It debuted number one in its timeslot, beating SBS's Hwasin – Controller of the Heart. AGB Nielsen Korea reported that a 6.2% was a solid rating for its time slot.)	6.3%	6.2%
April 16, 2013	2	7.2%	6.5%
April 23, 2013	3	6.5%	7.0%
April 30, 2013	4	6.8%	7.3%
May 7, 2013	5	7.0%	6.7%
May 14, 2013	6	6.3%	7.5%
May 21, 2013	7	7.1%	7.4%
May 28, 2013	8	6.9%	6.9%
June 4, 2013	9	6.5%	6.3%
June 11, 2013	10	6.8%	6.7%
June 18, 2013	11	7.0%	6.7%
June 25, 2013	12	6.3%	6.1%
July 2, 2013	13	7.3%	6.4%
July 9, 2013	14	7.4%	6.7%
July 16, 2013	15	7.2%	7.4%
July 23, 2013	16	7.3%	6.3%
July 30, 2013	17	7.0%	7.0%
August 6, 2013	18	7.4%	7.3%
August 13, 2013	19	8.1%	7.5%
August 20, 2013	20	8.4%	8.4%
August 27, 2013	21	8.2%	8.3%
September 3, 2013	22	7.2%	7.5%
September 10, 2013	23	7.3%	7.2%
September 17, 2013	24	9.0%	7.6%
September 24, 2013	25	7.4%	7.4%
October 1, 2013	26	8.3%	7.4%
October 8, 2013	27	7.3%	7.4%
October 15, 2013	28	5.3%	5.2%
October 22, 2013	29	6.5%	7.0%
October 29, 2013	30	5.6%	6.1%
November 5, 2013	31	5.6%	6.3%
November 12, 2013	32	6.9%	6.6%
November 19, 2013	33	5.6%	6.7%
November 26, 2013	34	6.3%	6.2%
December 3, 2013	35	6.7%	7.9%
December 10, 2013	36	5.8%	5.9%
December 17, 2013	37	6.8%	6.8%
December 24, 2013	38	7.1%	7.9%

In the ratings above, the highest rating of the year will be in red, and the lowest rating of the year will be in blue each year.

List of ratings in 2014 (episode 39–86)

Date	Episode	Nationwide	
Date	Episode	TNmS	AGB
January 7, 2014	39	7.5%	8.1%
January 14, 2014	40	8.6%	9.2%
January 21, 2014	41	6.8%	7.0%
January 28, 2014	42	6.1%	6.7%
February 4, 2014	43	6.2%	6.6%
February 18, 2014	44	6.9%	7.3%
February 25, 2014	45	4.8%	5.7%
March 4, 2014	46	4.9%	5.7%
March 11, 2014	47	5.8%	6.4%
March 18, 2014	48	5.6%	5.7%
March 25, 2014	49	4.6%	4.9%
April 1, 2014	50	4.0%	4.4%
April 8, 2014	51	2.7%	3.3%
April 15, 2015	52	4.9%	5.4%
April 29, 2015		4.1%	4.2%
May 6, 2015	53	6.4%	5.7%
May 13, 2014	54	6.0%	5.7%
May 20, 2014	55	6.4%	5.9%
May 27, 2014	56	6.1%	7.1%
June 3, 2014	57	6.2%	7.0%
June 10, 2014	58	4.8%	5.4%
June 17, 2014	59	5.4%	5.9%
June 24, 2014	60	3.4%	4.3%
July 1, 2014	61	4.3%	4.0%
July 8, 2014	62	4.4%	4.3%
July 15, 2014	63	6.1%	4.9%
July 22, 2014	64	4.6%	4.1%
July 29, 2014	65	5.8%	5.2%
August 5, 2014	66	5.4%	4.9%
August 12, 2014	67	6.4%	6.0%
August 19, 2014	68	6.2%	5.9%
August 26, 2014	69	6.4%	5.8%
September 9, 2014	70	5.0%	4.9%
September 16, 2014	71	5.5%	5.1%
September 23, 2014	72	6.9%	7.0%
September 30, 2014	73	5.8%	5.2%
October 7, 2014	74	5.0%	4.5%
October 14, 2014	75	5.9%	5.8%
October 21, 2014	76	5.2%	4.5%
October 28, 2014	77	5.4%	5.1%
November 4, 2014	78	5.2%	4.9%
November 11, 2014	79	5.2%	4.7%
November 18, 2014	80	4.7%	4.2%
November 25, 2014	81	4.6%	4.2%
December 2, 2014	82	5.4%	4.9%
December 9, 2014	83	4.7%	4.6%
December 16, 2014	84	4.8%	4.7%
December 23, 2014	85	5.6%	5.3%
December 30, 2014	86	3.7%	3.7%

In the ratings above, the highest rating of the year will be in red, and the lowest rating of the year will be in blue each year.

List of ratings in 2015 (episode 87–137)

Date	Episode	Nationwide	
Date	Episode	TNmS	AGB
January 6, 2015	87	6.1%	5.0%
January 13, 2015	88	6.0%	5.5%
January 20, 2015	89	6.0%	5.1%
January 27, 2015	90	5.5%	6.9%
February 3, 2015	91	6.0%	6.3%
February 10, 2015	92	6.6%	6.1%
February 17, 2015	93	5.9%	7.2%
February 24, 2015	94	6.2%	6.0%
March 3, 2015	95	6.0%	6.1%
March 10, 2015	96	5.7%	5.6%
March 17, 2015	97	5.6%	5.3%
March 24, 2015	98	5.3%	4.9%
March 31, 2015	99	4.4%	4.6%
April 7, 2015	100	5.6%	5.6%
April 14, 2015	101	4.8%	5.4%
April 21, 2015	102	4.9%	4.6%
April 28, 2015	103	4.3%	4.4%
May 5, 2015	104	4.5%	4.0%
May 12, 2015	105	5.1%	4.2%
May 19, 2015	106	4.9%	5.1%
May 26, 2015	107	5.5%	4.6%
June 2, 2015	108	6.0%	5.4%
June 9, 2015	109	5.4%	4.9%
June 16, 2015	110	5.8%	4.4%
June 23, 2015	111	5.4%	4.3%
June 30, 2015	112	4.3%	3.7%
July 7, 2015	113	5.8%	5.4%
July 14, 2015	114	5.3%	5.6%
July 21, 2015	115	5.8%	5.8%
July 28, 2015	116	5.2%	6.2%
August 4, 2015	117	5.5%	6.1%
August 11, 2015	118	5.6%	5.7%
August 18, 2015	119	5.7%	5.7%
August 25, 2015	120	4.5%	3.7%
September 1, 2015	121	4.3%	4.3%
September 8, 2015	122	3.6%	3.5%
September 15, 2015	123	4.2%	3.3%
September 22, 2015	124	3.5%	3.8%
October 6, 2015	125	3.8%	4.0%
October 13, 2015	126	3.9%	4.4%
October 20, 2015	127	3.6%	4.4%
October 27, 2015	128	4.6%	3.7%
November 3, 2015	129	4.4%	4.0%
November 10, 2015	130	4.4%	4.2%
November 17, 2015	131	3.9%	3.8%
November 24, 2015	132	4.7%	4.8%
December 1, 2015	133	4.3%	5.1%
December 8, 2015	134	3.9%	4.2%
December 15, 2015	135	4.2%	5.6%
December 22, 2015	136	3.7%	5.0%
December 29, 2015	137	3.9%	4.8%

In the ratings above, the highest rating of the year will be in red, and the lowest rating of the year will be in blue each year.

List of ratings in 2016 (episode 138–174)

Date	Episode	Nationwide	
Date	Episode	TNmS	AGB
January 5, 2016	138	5.0%	5.8%
January 12, 2016	139	3.8%	5.3%
January 19, 2016	140	4.9%	3.9%
January 26, 2016	141	4.1%	5.4%
February 2, 2016	142	4.4%	4.4%
February 16, 2016	143	3.8%	4.1%
February 23, 2016	144	3.6%	4.7%
March 1, 2016	145	4.0%	5.1%
March 8, 2016	146	3.9%	4.4%
March 15, 2016	147	3.0%	3.9%
March 22, 2016	148	3.4%	3.2%
March 29, 2016	149	4.6%	4.1%
April 5, 2016	150	3.5%	4.4%
April 12, 2016	151	4.2%	5.1%
April 19, 2016	152	3.7%	4.2%
April 26, 2016	153	3.8%	4.2%
May 3, 2016	154	3.9%	5.6%
May 10, 2016	155	3.6%	4.6%
May 17, 2016	156	3.7%	4.6%
May 24, 2016	157	3.5%	5.1%
May 31, 2016	158	3.6%	4.4%
June 7, 2016	159	3.4%	4.5%
June 14, 2016	160	3.1%	3.5%
June 21, 2016	161	2.8%	3.4%
June 28, 2016	162	2.5%	3.1%
July 5, 2016	163	2.9%	3.7%
July 12, 2016	164	3.1%	4.3%
July 19, 2016	165	3.7%	3.9%
July 26, 2016	166	3.2%	3.8%
August 2, 2016	167	3.6%	3.3%
August 23, 2016	168	4.0%	3.3%
August 30, 2016	169	3.5%	2.9%
September 6, 2016	170	4.0%	4.0%
September 13, 2016	171	4.2%	5.6%
September 20, 2016	172	4.2%	4.4%
September 27, 2016	173	5.2%	4.9%
October 4, 2016	174		4.3%

In the ratings above, the highest rating of the year will be in red, and the lowest rating of the year will be in blue each year.
