= Park Sungho =

- Hangul: 박성호
- RR: Bak Seongho
- MR: Pak Sŏngho

Park Seong-ho or Park Sung-ho is a Korean name consisting of the family name Park and the given name Seong-ho. The name may refer to:

- Park Seong-ho (comedian) (born 1974), South Korean comedian
- Park Sung-ho (footballer) (born 1982), South Korean male footballer

== See also ==
- Park Seong-hoe (born 1947), Korean immunologist and pathologist
- Park Seung-ho, South Korean politician
- Park (Korean surname), including a list of people with that name
- Sung-ho, the given name, including a list of people with that name
