= 2016 MBC Entertainment Awards =

16th edition of award ceremony

- Date: December 29, 2016
- Site: MBC Public Hall, Sangam-dong, Mapo-gu, Seoul
- Hosted by: Kim Sung-joo; Jun Hyun-moo; Lee Sung-kyung

Television coverage
- Network: MBC
- Duration: 170 minutes
- Ratings: 11.8% (Part 1); 11.1% (Part 2)

The 2016 MBC Entertainment Awards presented by Munhwa Broadcasting Corporation (MBC), took place on December 29, 2016, at MBC Public Hall in Sangam-dong, Mapo-gu, Seoul. It was hosted by Kim Sung-joo, Jun Hyun-moo and Lee Sung-kyung. The nominees were chosen from MBC variety, talk and comedy shows that aired from December 2015 to November 2016.

== Nominations and winners ==
(Winners denoted in bold)

Grand Prize (Daesang)		Program of the Year
**Yoo Jae-suk** - **Infinite Challenge**; Jeong Jun-ha* - Infinite Challenge; Kim Gu-ra - Radio Star; Kim Sung-joo* - King of Mask Singer		**Infinite Challenge**; I Live Alone; King of Mask Singer; Radio Star; We Got Married Season 4
Top Excellence Award
in Variety Show	in Music/Talk Show	in Radio Show
Male	**Kim Sung-joo** - **Capable People**, **King of Mask Singer**; Kim Gu-ra - King of Mask Singer, Radio Star	**Bae Cheol-soo** - **Bae Cheol-soo's Music Camp**
**Jeong Jun-ha** - **Infinite Challenge**; Yoo Jae-suk - Infinite Challenge	**Kim Sung-joo** - **Capable People**, **King of Mask Singer**; Kim Gu-ra - King of Mask Singer, Radio Star	**Bae Cheol-soo** - **Bae Cheol-soo's Music Camp**
Female	**Kim Sung-joo** - **Capable People**, **King of Mask Singer**; Kim Gu-ra - King of Mask Singer, Radio Star	**Bae Cheol-soo** - **Bae Cheol-soo's Music Camp**
**Lee Guk-joo** - **I Live Alone**, **We Got Married Season 4**; Han Chae-ah - I Live Alone; Han Hye-jin - I Live Alone; Seo In-young - Real Men Season 2	**Kim Sung-joo** - **Capable People**, **King of Mask Singer**; Kim Gu-ra - King of Mask Singer, Radio Star	**Bae Cheol-soo** - **Bae Cheol-soo's Music Camp**
Excellence Award
in Variety Show	in Music/Talk Show	in Radio Show
Male		**Kim Hyun-chul** - **Kim Hyun-chul's Discovery of the Afternoon**; **Kim Shin-young** - **Kim Shin-young's Noon Song of Hope**
**Heo Kyung-hwan** - **Real Men Season 2**; Hwang Kwanghee - Infinite Challenge; Jun Hyun-moo - I Live Alone; Sleepy - I Live Alone, We Got Married Season 4	**Yoo Young-seok** - **King of Mask Singer**; Cho Kyuhyun - Radio Star; Kim Gook-jin - Radio Star, Section TV; Lee Yoon-seok - King of Mask Singer	**Kim Hyun-chul** - **Kim Hyun-chul's Discovery of the Afternoon**; **Kim Shin-young** - **Kim Shin-young's Noon Song of Hope**
Female		**Kim Hyun-chul** - **Kim Hyun-chul's Discovery of the Afternoon**; **Kim Shin-young** - **Kim Shin-young's Noon Song of Hope**
**Park Na-rae** - **I Live Alone**, **We Got Married Season 4**; Cao Lu - We Got Married Season 4; Lee So-ra - I Live Alone; Seo Yu-ri - My Little Television	**Solbi** - **King of Mask Singer**, **Radio Star**; Ali - King of Mask Singer; Baek Ji-young - Duet Song Festival; Kim Sae-ron - Show! Music Core	**Kim Hyun-chul** - **Kim Hyun-chul's Discovery of the Afternoon**; **Kim Shin-young** - **Kim Shin-young's Noon Song of Hope**
Rookie Award
in Variety Show	in Music/Talk Show	in Radio Show
Male		**Kangta** - **Kangta's Starry Night**; **Park Soo-hong** - **Choi Yoo-ra, Park Soo-hong's Now the Radio Generation**
**Park Chan-ho** - **Real Men Season 2**; Lee Si-eon - I Live Alone, Real Men Season 2; Jackson Wang - Real Men Season 2; Yang Se-chan - We Got Married Season 4	**Han Dong-geun** - **Duet Song Festival**; Cha Eun-woo - Show! Music Core; Parc Jae-jung - Capable People, Radio Star; Roy Kim - King of Mask Singer	**Kangta** - **Kangta's Starry Night**; **Park Soo-hong** - **Choi Yoo-ra, Park Soo-hong's Now the Radio Generation**
Female		**Kangta** - **Kangta's Starry Night**; **Park Soo-hong** - **Choi Yoo-ra, Park Soo-hong's Now the Radio Generation**
**Lee Si-young** - **Real Men Season 2**; Cheng Xiao - Idol Star Athletic Championship XII, My Little Television; Kim Jin-kyung - We Got Married Season 4; Solar - We Got Married Season 4	**Shin Go-eun** - **King of Mask Singer**, **Section TV**; Lee Soo-min - Show! Music Core; Lee Sun-bin - King of Mask Singer, Radio Star; Park Jin-joo - King of Mask Singer	**Kangta** - **Kangta's Starry Night**; **Park Soo-hong** - **Choi Yoo-ra, Park Soo-hong's Now the Radio Generation**
Popularity Award	MC Award	PD's Award
**Han Hye-jin** - **I Live Alone**; **Jo Se-ho** and **Cao Lu** - **We Got Married Season 4**; **Yang Se-hyung** - **Infinite Challenge**	**Baek Ji-young**, **Sung Si-kyung**, **Yoo Se-yoon** - **Duet Song Festival**	**Kim Gu-ra** - **King of Mask Singer**, **My Little Television**, **Radio Star**
Best Teamwork Award	Achievement Award	Special Award
**King of Mask Singer team**	**Goo Bong-seo**	**Ha Hyun-woo** - **King of Mask Singer** (Singer); **Jun Hyun-moo** - **I Live Alone** (Variety Show); **Yoon Jong-shin** - **Radio Star** (Music/Talk Show)
Scriptwriter of the Year
in Variety	in Current Events	in Radio
**Lee Hae-young** - **Real Men Season 2**	**Jo Hee-jeong - PD Note**; **Heo Hyun-jeong - Think of Culture**	**Park Geum-seon - Yang Hee-eun, Seo Kyung-seok's Women Generation**
Best Couple Award		Contribution Award
**Eric Nam** and **Solar** - **We Got Married Season 4**; Choi Tae-joon and Yoon Bo-mi - We Got Married Season 4; Hong Hye-geol and Yeo Esther - My Little Television; Jo Se-ho and Cao Lu - We Got Married Season 4; Jota and Kim Jin-kyung - We Got Married Season 4; Sleepy and Lee Guk-joo - I Live Alone, We Got Married Season 4		**Republic of Korea Army**; **Republic of Korea Navy**
Special Awards		Achievement Award in Radio
in Current Events	in Radio	Achievement Award in Radio
**Wang Sang-han - Talk Issues Say Current Events**	**Jung Cheol-jin - Kim Dong-hwan's We Are The World**; **Lee Ha-na - Lee Jin-woo's The Economy in Hand**	**Amberin**

*Jeong Jun-ha and Kim Sung-joo were the Grand Prize initial nominees alongside Yoo Jae-suk and Kim Gura, but after they won the Top Excellence Awards, their names were eliminated as the Grand Prize nominees at the end.

== Presenters ==
Order	Presenter	Award	Ref.
1	Park Myeong-su, Kwanghee (ZE:A)	Rookie Award in Music/Talk Show	
2	Lee Soo-geun, Heechul (Super Junior)	Rookie Award in Variety Show	
3	Jonghyun (SHINee), Sunny (Girls' Generation)	Top Excellence/Excellence/Rookie Award in Radio Show	
4	Jeong Jun-ha, Yang Se-hyung	Scriptwriter of the Year; PD's Award	
5	Lee Si-eon, Lee Guk-joo	Best Teamwork Award	
6	Yoo Jae-suk, Solbi	Best Couple Award; Special Award	
7	Lee Kyung-kyu	Achievement Award	
8	Gong Myung, Jung Hye-sung	Popularity Award	
9	Eric Nam, Park Na-rae	MC Award	
10	Kim Gu-ra, Han Hye-jin	Excellence Award in Music/Talk Show	
11	Yoon Jong-shin, Kyuhyun (Super Junior)	Excellence Award in Variety Show	
11	Haha, Han Chae-ah	Top Excellence Award in Variety Show, Female	
12	Sung Si-kyung, Seohyun (Girls' Generation)	Top Excellence Award in Music/Talk Show; Top Excellence Award in Variety Show, Male	
13	Park Chan-ho, Lee Si-young	Program of the Year	
14	Ahn Gwang-han, Kim So-yeon	Grand Prize (Daesang)	

== Special performances ==
Order	Artist	Song/Spectacle	Ref.
1	DJ Park Na-rae & Madtown	Dance opening	
1	Lee Soo-min & Kim Sae-ron (Show! Music Core's MCs)	"Russian Roulette" (러시안 룰렛)	
1	Hong Hye-geol & Yeo Esther (My Little Television's guests)	"My Ear's Candy" (내 귀에 캔디)	
1	Lee Guk-joo & Sleepy (We Got Married Season 4's cast member)	"Who's Your Mama" (어머님이 누구니)	
2	Kim Gu-ra, DinDin, Nam Chang-hee, Heo Kyung-hwan, Hwang Je-sung	"Cheer Up"	
3	Kim Sung-joo, Lee Si-young	"Just the Way We Love" (우리 사랑 이대로)	
4	"MC Minzi" Jeong Jun-ha, Haha, Yang Se-hyung	"Hit Da Hit" (히트다 히트)	
5	Yoo Jae-suk, Sechs Kies	"Couple" (커플)	
