= Moonlight Prince =

South Korean television talk show

- Title card
- Hangul: 달빛프린스
- RR: Dalbit peurinseu
- MR: Talpit p'ŭrinsŭ
- Genre: Variety, talk show
- Written by: Moon Eun Ae
- Presented by: Kang Ho-dong; Max Changmin; Tak Jae-hoon; Jung Jae-hyung; Brave Brothers
- Country of origin: South Korea
- Original language: Korean
- No. of episodes: 8

Production
- Producer: Lee Ye Ji
- Running time: Tuesdays

Original release
- Network: Korean Broadcasting System
- Release: 22 January – 12 March 2013

Moonlight Prince (Korean: 달빛프린스) is a South Korean television talk show which premiered 22 January 2013 on KBS. It aired its last episode on March 12, 2013. It was succeeded by Our Neighborhood Arts and Physical Education with two of the show's main MCs, Kang Ho Dong and Max Changmin.

== History ==
The show was first announced on 6 December 2012 as a vehicle for Kang Ho-dong's return to KBS. At the time the show's format and concept were kept under wraps, with the only confirmed detail that it was not a reality variety show. It was also revealed that Kang was in talks with producer Lee Ye-ji of KBS2′s Hello and Sang Sang Plus and writer Moon Eun-ae of MBC′s Infinite Challenge and Knee Drop Guru, and that it would start airing mid-January 2013. KBS said of the show, "It's different from 'Star King' or 'Knee Drop Guru', so Kang Ho-dong is very passionate and responsible about it. He has specially requested that the production stay in secret. It's even difficult for us to let out information that he met the staff."

On 23 December 2012 S.M. Entertainment confirmed that TVXQ's Max Changmin would be co-MC with Kang for the yet to be revealed show. It marked Changmin's first time, after nine years in the entertainment industry, of being a regular MC and Kang's official comeback to KBS. It was revealed on January 4, 2013 that the show tentatively titled I Like You, Night of Meeting was to premiere on 22 January, taking over Win Win's time slot. It was also revealed that the cast would also consist of Tak Jae-hoon, Jung Jae-hyung, and Brave Brothers. On 9 January it was announced by KBS that the show's title would be changed to Moonlight Prince. In their statement KBS said, "Originally, the title 'I Like You, Night of Meeting', was a working title. After the production staff held a conference, they have decided to go with the fresh title 'Moonlight Prince'."

Moonlight Prince held its first closed filming on January 12, 2013. The first guest to be confirmed was Lee Seo-jin.

== Format ==
It was revealed on January 15, 2013 that the show would be a book and theme focused show. The five cast members attended the show's press conference on 16 January in Yeouido, and on 18 January KBS released a teaser of the show.

Each week the featured guest would select a book of his or her own choosing, which would inspire that episode's topics and themes for discussion by the hosts and guests, over the course of the series topics ranged from adolescence to investing. A portion of the proceeds from each week's episode was donated to a charity of the guest's choice.

== Guests ==
| Episode # | Original broadcast date | Guests | Ref |
|---|---|---|---|
| 1 | 22 January 2013 | Lee Seo-jin | |
| 2 | 29 January 2013 | Kim Soo-ro | |
| 3 | 5 February 2013 | Lee Bo-young | |
| 4 | 12 February 2013 | Jung Yong-hwa (CNBLUE), Moon Hee-Jun, Haha, Woo Ji-won (우지원) | |
| 5 | 19 February 2013 | Lee Jae-ryong, Lee Hoon | |
| 6 | 26 February 2013 | Yoo In-na, Sunhwa (Secret) | |
| 7 | 5 March 2013 | Lee Young Ja, Kim Wan-sun, Kim Sook, Kwon Jin Yeong | |
| 8 | 12 March 2013 | Jinwoon (2AM), Changmin (2AM), Kim Tae-woo | |

== Ratings ==
In the ratings below, the highest rating for the show will in be red, and the lowest rating for the show will be in blue.

| Episode # | Original broadcast date | Nationwide Ratings | |
| Episode # | Original broadcast date | TNmS Ratings | AGB Ratings |
|---|---|---|---|
| 1 | 22 January 2013 | 6.0% | 5.7% |
| 2 | 29 January 2013 | 5.1% | 4.7% |
| 3 | 5 February 2013 | 4.6% | 4.2% |
| 4 | 12 February 2013 | 3.9% | 3.4% |
| 5 | 19 February 2013 | 4.3% | 3.5% |
| 6 | 26 February 2013 | 4.0% | 3.1%. |
| 7 | 5 March 2013 | 5.2% | 4.8% |
| 8 | 12 March 2013 | 4.2% | 3.3% |
