= Kim Jin-kyung =

South Korean model and actress (born 1997)

- 김진경
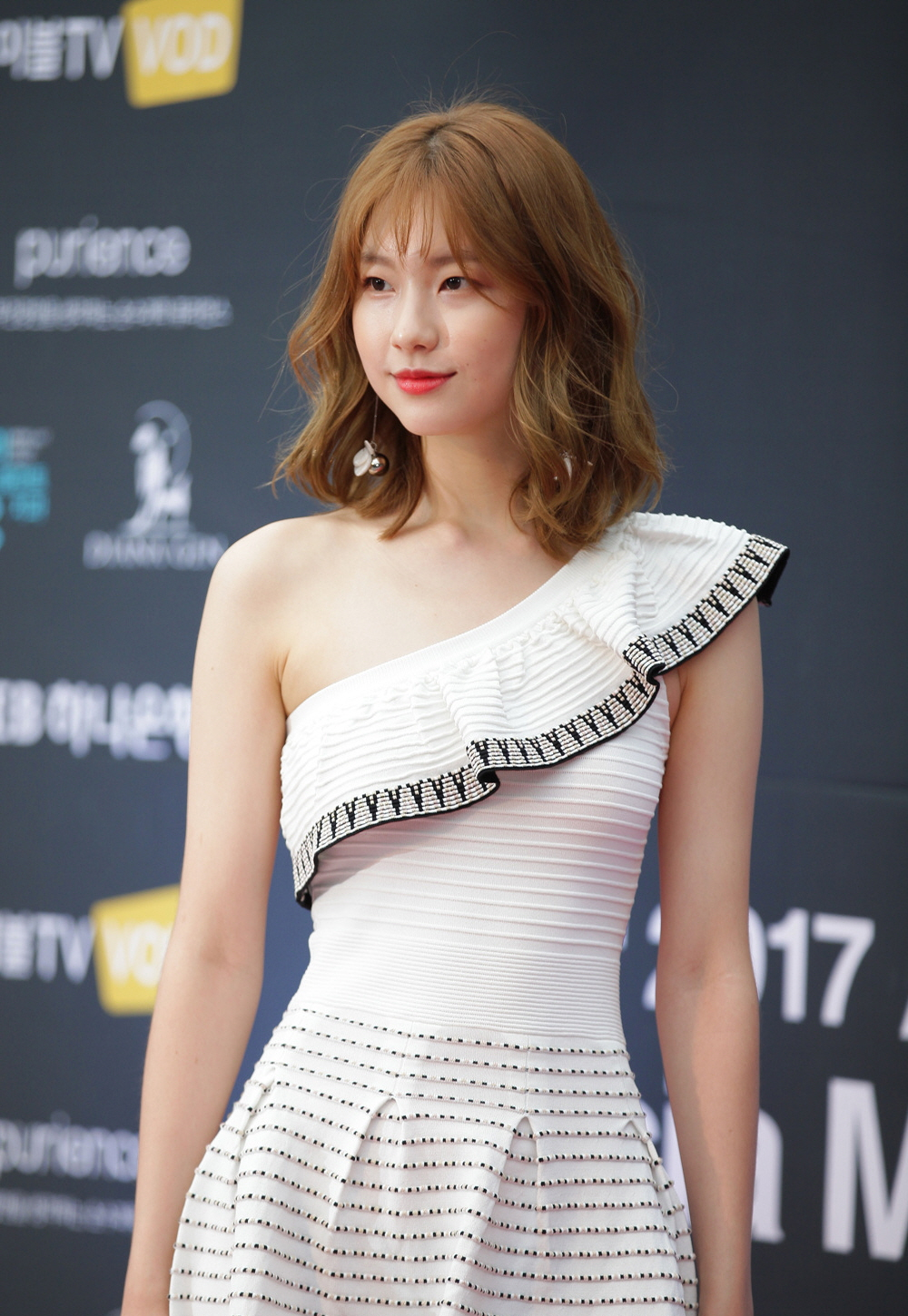
- Kim at the 12th Asian Model Awards in June 2017
- Born: March 3, 1997 (age 29); Seoul, South Korea
- Years active: 2012–present
- Spouse: Kim Seung-gyu (m. 2024)
- Children: 1
- Modeling information
- Height: 172 cm (5 ft 7 1/2 in)
- Hair color: Dark brown
- Eye color: Dark brown
- Agency: Sublime

Korean name
- Hangul: 김진경
- RR: Gim Jingyeong
- MR: Kim Chin'gyŏng

Kim Jin-kyung (Korean: 김진경; born March 3, 1997) is a South Korean model and actress. In 2012, she participated in OnStyle's Korea's Next Top Model, becoming the runner up. She made her acting debut in 2016, with the web-drama Yellow.

== Personal life ==
On April 29, 2024, Sublime confirmed that Kim would marry professional football player Kim Seung-gyu in June. The couple married on June 17, 2024, in Seoul.

She revealed her pregnancy during the 2025 SBS Entertainment Awards. It will be their first child. On June 4, 2026, Kim gave birth to a daughter.

== Filmography ==
=== Variety shows ===
Year	Title	Role	Notes	Ref.
2012	Korea's Next Top Model	Participant	Cycle 3 runner up	
2016	We Got Married	Cast with Jota (Madtown)	Ep 321-350	
2018	Mimi Shop	Cast Member		
2018	Law of the Jungle	Cast Member	Ep 305 – 310 (Patagonia)	
2021–2022	Goal Girl	Cast Member	Season 1–2	

=== Television series ===
Year	Title	Role	Ref.
2017	Andante	Kim Bom	
2018	Tofu Personified	Baek Min-kyung	
2019	Perfume	Kim Jin-kyung	

=== Web series ===
Year	Title	Role	Ref.
2016	Yellow	Lee Ruda	

== Awards and nominations ==
Year	Award	Nominated work	Category	Result	Ref.
2016	MBC Entertainment Awards	Kim Jin-kyung (with Jota); We Got Married	Best Couple Award	Nominated	
2025	SBS Entertainment Awards	Shooting Stars	Top Excellence Award (Reality)	Won	
