= Cao Lu =

Chinese singer and actress (born 1987)

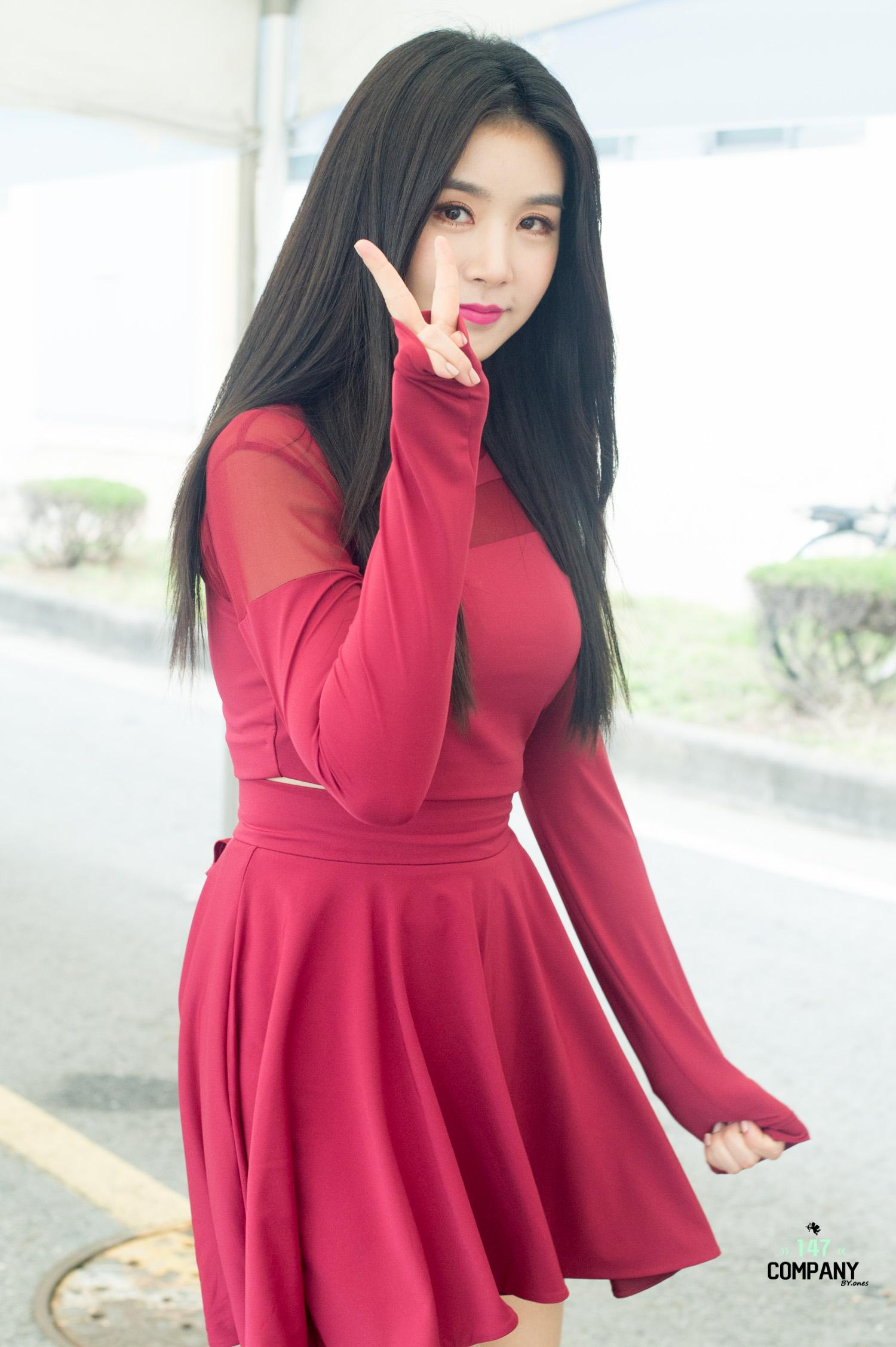
- Cao Lu in April 2016
- Born: August 30, 1987 (age 38); Zhangjiajie, Hunan, China
- Occupations: Singer; actress; television personality
- Years active: 2004–2005; 2012–present
- Musical career
- Genres: Dance-pop; K-pop; R&B
- Instrument: Vocals
- Label: Kakao M · Bomnal
- Member of: Fiestar

Chinese name
- Chinese: 曹璐
Transcriptions
Standard Mandarin
- Hanyu Pinyin: Cáo Lù

Korean name
- Hangul: 차오루

Cao Lu (Chinese: 曹璐; born August 30, 1987) is a Chinese singer, actress, and television personality. She was a member of the South Korean girl group Fiestar until her group's disbandment in 2018 and regrouped in August 22, 2024.

== Early life ==
Cao Lu was born in Zhangjiajie, Hunan, China on August 30, 1987. She is an ethnic Miao. Cao Lu studied at Chung-Ang University in South Korea.

== Career ==
=== 2004: Solo career ===
Lu made her solo debut in China under the name Lu Lu. She released her independent extended play "Cat(貓咪)" in 2004.

=== 2012–2018: Debut with Fiestar, solo activities and group disbandment ===
Cao Lu made her debut as a member of South Korean girl group Fiestar under LOEN Entertainment label on August 31, 2012, with their first single "Vista".

In February 2016, Cao Lu was cast in MBC's Real Men for the female soldier edition. In the same month, she was confirmed to cast in We Got Married along with comedian Jo Se-ho as a couple, which she departed from in September 2016.

In 2017, Cao Lu collaborated with Yerin and Kisum on the single "Spring Again".

On May 15, 2018, Fave Entertainment announced that Fiestar would be disbanded due to the expiration of the other members' contracts on April 30, 2018. Cao Lu's contract expired a month later on May 31, and on June 1, it was confirmed that she left the company after deciding not to renew her contract.

=== 2018–present: New agencies and Fiestar reunion ===
In September 2018, Lu signed with IOK Company.

In March 2021, EE-Media announced on Weibo that Cao Lu had joined its ranks. On August 22, 2024, Fiestar announced to make comeback to celebrate their 12th anniversary debut and Lu will restart group activities with Fiestar after 6 years.

== Discography ==
=== EP ===
- Cat(貓咪) (2004)

== Filmography ==
=== Television series ===
Year	Title	Role
2016	The Sound of Your Heart	Chinese Actress (Cameo)
2017	Missing Nine	Cai Ming

=== Variety show ===
Year	Title	Notes
2016	Real Men Season 2 – Female Edition 4	Cast member
2016	King of Mask Singer	Contestant as "Don't Compel to Me, Korean Trip" (episode 87)
2016	We Got Married	Cast member (paired with Jo Se-ho)
2016	Uncontrollably Acting	Cast member
2016	Video Star	Main host
2017	Strong Girls	Fixed Cast Member
2017	Oppa Thinking	Intern (Episode 10–25)
2018	Immortal Songs: Singing the Legend	Contestant (episode 357)
2019	Training Korean	Cast member, student

== Awards and nominations ==
Year	Award	Category	Nominated work	Result
2005	China Central Television's Chinese Music Top 10	Newcomer Award	Cat	Won
2017	2016 MBC Entertainment Awards	Female Excellence Award in a Variety Show	We Got Married	Nominated
2017	2016 MBC Entertainment Awards	Best Couple Award	We Got Married	Nominated
2017	2016 MBC Entertainment Awards	Popularity Award	We Got Married	Won
