= Mad Town (EP) =

EP by Madtown
- Released: October 6, 2014
- Recorded: 2014
- Genre: K-pop, dance-pop, hip hop
- Length: 14:33
- Label: J. Tune Camp; LOEN Entertainment

Madtown chronology
Mad Town (2014)	Welcome to Madtown (2015)

Singles from Mad Town
- 1. "YOLO" Released: October 6, 2014

Mad Town is the debut extended play by South Korean boy band Madtown. It was released digitally on October 6, 2014, and physically on October 9, 2014. The song "YOLO" was used to promote the EP.

== Music video ==
Prior to the release of the full music video, J. Tune Camp uploaded the music video teaser for "YOLO" on its official YouTube channel on October 1, 2014. The full music video was subsequently released 5 days later on October 6, 2014.

== Track listing ==
No.	Title	Lyrics	Music	Length
1.	"Mad Town" (Intro)	Super Cheongdam, BUFFY	Super Cheongdam	1:17
2.	"YOLO"	Deanfluenza	Jordan Kyle	3:08
3.	"What's Your Number?"	Ban Hyung Mun, MOOS, BUFFY	Ban Hyung Mun, AK47	3:22
4.	"Stunning"	Super Cheongdam	Super Cheongdam	3:35
5.	"YOLO" (Instrumental)		Jordan Kyle	3:08
Total length:				14:33

== Charts ==
Chart	Peak position
Gaon Weekly album chart	11

== Sales and certifications ==
Chart	Amount
Gaon physical sales	2,224+

== Release history ==
Country	Date	Format	Label
South Korea	October 6, 2014	Digital download	J.Tune Camp LOEN Entertainment
South Korea	October 9, 2014	CD	J.Tune Camp LOEN Entertainment
