= Kisum =

South Korean rapper (born 1994)

- 키썸
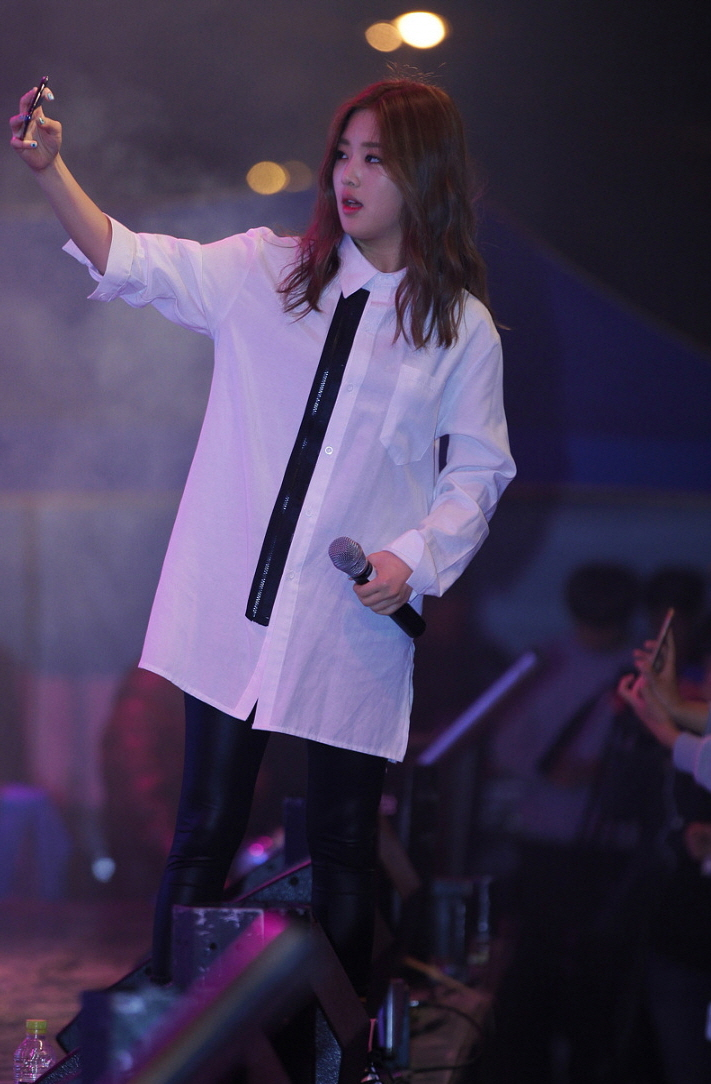
- Kisum in 2014
- Born: Jo Hye-ryung; January 20, 1994 (age 32); Seoul, South Korea
- Occupations: Rapper; songwriter; record producer
- Musical career
- Genre: Hip hop
- Years active: 2013–present
- Labels: Mapps; FirstOne
- Website: RND

Jo Hye-ryung (Korean: 조혜령; born January 20, 1994), also known by her stage name Kisum (키썸), is a South Korean rapper, songwriter, record producer and television personality. In 2015, Kisum competed on the first season of the variety show Unpretty Rapstar. She had previously competed in season three of variety show, Show Me the Money.

== Career ==
In August 2013, Kisum has appeared on a G bus TV broadcast on a bus in Gyeonggi Province. Kisum gained popularity for her participation in Unpretty Rapstar in 2015, where she made it until the semi-finals before being eliminated from the show. In 2016, she starred in the Netflix television series My Runway.

== Discography ==
=== Extended plays ===
Title	Album details	Peak chart positions	Sales
Title	Album details	KOR	Sales
Like It	Released: August 29, 2014; Label: MAPPS Entertainment, NHN Entertainment; Formats: CD, digital download; Track listing: 1. Que Sera Sera (케세라세라); 2. Like It (버스안에서); 3. Liar; 4. Put It Down	—	—N/a
Musik	Released: June 23, 2016; Label: MAPPS Entertainment, LOEN Entertainment; Formats: CD, digital download; Track listing: 1. No Jam; 2. 2 Beer (맥주 두 잔); 3. Free Time (자유시간); 4. Rooftop Room (옥타빵); 5. Cover Up	28	KOR: 782+
The Sun, The Moon	Released: April 14, 2017; Label: MAPPS Entertainment, CJ E&M; Formats: CD, digital download; Track listing: 1. The Sun, The Moon In Love; 2. In The Rain; 3. Stop Calling (그만 연락해); 4. Sleep Tight (잘자)	28	KOR: 620+
Yeah!sool	Released: August 20, 2019; Label: MAPPS Entertainment; Formats: CD, download, streaming; Track listing: 1. Yeah Yeah; 2. Let's Drink Up; 3. I Wonder If This Is Right; 4. I'll Give You Everything; 5. Warning; 6. Say Hi	_	N/A
"—" denotes releases that did not chart.

=== Singles ===
Title	Year	Peak chart positions	Sales (DL)	Album
Title	Year	KOR	Sales (DL)	Album
"First Love" with Se-A	2013	—	—N/a	Non-album singles
"Liar" with Se-A	2014	—	—N/a	Non-album singles
"Put It Down" feat. Min Hoon-ki	2014	—	—N/a	Like It
"Like It" (버스안에서)	2014	—	—N/a	Like It
"Superstar" (슈퍼스타) with D.O., San E, C-Luv	2015	5	KOR: 433,640+	Unpretty Rapstar 1
"To Mom" feat. Insooni	2015	23	KOR: 166,534+	Unpretty Rapstar 1
"Feedback" (피드백) with Lil Cham, Bora, Jace, I.M	2015	18	KOR: 96,633+	Non-album singles
"#White Style" (#화이트 스타일) feat. Kim Ho-yeon	2015	21	KOR: 108,420+	Non-album singles
"You & Me" (심상치 않아) feat. Jooyoung	2015	34	KOR: 165,817+	Non-album singles
"Not Enough" (성에 안차) by Jace	2015	—	—N/a	Non-album singles
"3sec" (3초) with Homme	2015	66	KOR: 31,568+	Non-album singles
"Love Talk" feat. Hwasa	2015	43	KOR: 81,336+	Non-album singles
"Jealousy" (질투) with Yoo Sung-eun	2016	34	KOR: 99,695+	Non-album singles
"2 Beer" (맥주 두 잔)	2016	17	KOR: 155,075+	Musik
"No Jam"	2016	74	KOR: 52,318+	Musik
"Rooftop Room" (옥타빵)	2016	—	—N/a	Musik
"Finding Differences" (틀린그림찾기) with Lim Seul-ong	2016	34	KOR: 149,132+	Uncontrollably Fond OST
"What the Hiphop!?" (#WTF) with Hong Dae-kwang	2016	33	KOR: 64,483+	Non-album singles
"Spring Again" (왜 또 봄이야) with Cao Lu, Yerin	2017	37	KOR: 82,419+	Non-album singles
"B-Day" with Lucy	2017	—	—N/a	Non-album singles
"Sleep Tight" (잘자) feat. Gilgubonggu	2017	61	KOR: 60,506+	The Sun, The Moon
"About to Cry" (울기 일보 직전) with Stella Jang	2017	—	—N/a	Story About: Some, One Month
"Fruity" with Hyolyn	2017	—	—N/a	Non-album singles
"It's Okay" featuring Heize	2018	73	—N/a	Non-album singles
"100%"	2018	—	—N/a	Non-album singles
"Say Hi" featuring Woody	2019	—	—N/a	Yeah!sool
"Primero" (1위)	2020	—	—N/a	Non-album singles
"—" denotes releases that did not chart or were not released in that region.

== Filmography ==
=== Television shows ===
Year	Title	Role	Network
2016	My Runway	Na-rae	Netflix
2019	My Sibling's Lovers: Family Is Watching	Cast	E Channel
