= My Runway =

2016 South Korean streaming television series

- Promotional poster
- Genre: Comedy drama; Romantic comedy; Fantasy
- Written by: Kwon Ki-kyung; Kim Kyung-min
- Directed by: Heo Chan
- Starring: Park Ji-yeon; Kang Dong-ho; Kang Chul-woong; Ahn Bo-hyun; Hak Jin; Jo Hye-ryung
- Composer: Shin Min-yong
- Country of origin: South Korea
- Original language: Korean
- No. of seasons: 1
- No. of episodes: 6

Production
- Executive producers: Bang Jung-oh; Lee Suk-ki
- Producer: Kim Myung
- Cinematography: Hong Jae-sik; Shin Kyung-won
- Editor: Kim Ji-hyun
- Running time: 20–27 minutes
- Production company: C-Story

Original release
- Release: 20 December – 31 December 2016

My Runway (Korean: 마이 런웨이) is a South Korean streaming television series directed by Heo Chan. It stars Park Ji-yeon, Kang Dong-ho, Kang Chul-woong, Ahn Bo-hyun, Hak Jin, and Jo Hye-ryung. The series aired from 20 December to 31 December 2016, consisting of six episodes.

== Plot ==
Han Seo Yeon (Ji-Yeon) is a bright, healthy, and outgoing high school student who dreams of becoming a model, but she's worried about being rejected due to her height. She then applies to a fashion show, in which Jin-wook (Kang Dong-ho), who is one of the top male models in Korea, is part of the approval board.

When Han Seo Yeon and Jin-wook meet each other at the fashion model show's casting, Jin-wook harshly treats Seo Yeon because he thinks she's too short for a model, and he doesn't want to deceive her by allowing her to pass at the casting, only to be eliminated from the show at a later point for entertainment purposes, and she leaves the audition disappointed.

Then, to cheer her up, her childhood friend Na-rae (Kisum) takes her to a karaoke bar to lift up her spirits.

In a strange coincidence, Jin-wook, who got fired from the fashion show's approval board, is also in the bar celebrating his friend's birthday, then later an incident occurs where Jin-wook and Seo Yeon switch bodies after being electrocuted during a storm. They must find a way to switch their bodies back without getting caught by their friends.

== Cast ==
- Park Ji-yeon as Han Seo-yeon
- Kang Dong-ho as Na Jin-wook
- Kang Chul-woong as Yoon Jae-bum
- Ahn Bo-hyun as Wang Rim
- Hak Jin as Yang Chun-sik
- Jo Hye-ryung as Park Na-rae
- Jo Jae-yoon as Claude Bong

== Episodes ==
No.	Title	Original release date
1	"Episode 1 You can do it. Behind the scenes." Transliteration: "Part 1 It's better to do it. Backwards." (Korean: 제1회 하면되는 게 애라. 뒤면 하는 거.)	20 December 2016
2	"Episode 2 If I were you? Absolutely fine!" Transliteration: "Part 2 Of all people, you? Thank you!" (Korean: 제2회 하필이면너? 고맙게도너!)	December 2016
3	"Episode 3 Can we go back?" Transliteration: "Part 3 Can we turn back?" (Korean: 제3회 우리가 돌이갈 수 있을까?)	December 2016
4	"Episode 4 If that's the case, we're bound to get together" Transliteration: "Part 4 Then we have no other choice but to make a relationship" (Korean: 제4회 그렇다면 우리둘이 사길수빆에)	December 2016
5	"Episode 5 The moment we were missing" Transliteration: "Part 5 The fateful moment that we didn't notice" (Korean: 제5회 우리가 놓치고 있었던 운명이 순간)	December 2016
6	"Episode 6 I don't know what happened. A miracle." Transliteration: "Part 6 Something may happen. Even a miracle." (Korean: 제6회 진파 일어날 지도 몰라. 기적)	31 December 2016
