= Lee Hoon (actor) =

South Korean actor

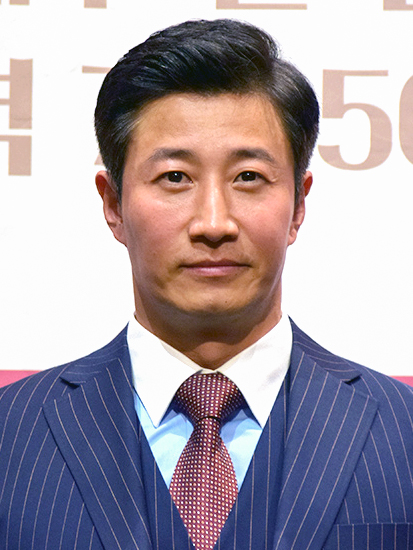
- Lee in 2019
- Born: May 6, 1973 (age 53); Seoul, South Korea
- Education: Korea University Sejong Campus - Economics
- Occupation: Actor
- Years active: 1994–present
- Agent: IHQ
- Spouse: Kim Hye-jin
- Children: 2 sons

Korean name
- Hangul: 이훈
- Hanja: 李勳
- RR: I Hun
- MR: I Hun

Lee Hoon (born May 6, 1973) is a South Korean actor.

== Filmography ==
=== Television series ===
Year	Title	Role	Notes/Ref.
1994	The Moon of Seoul	Cha In-keun	
1995	Hotel	Waiter	
1995	General Hospital	OB/GYN resident Gu In-tae	
1996	August Bride	Kwon-pyo	
1997	Palace of Dreams	Kim Seok-hwan	
1997	Star	Min Do-hyun	
1997	New York Story		
1998	Seoul Tango		
1998	Run Barefoot	Na Young-dan	
1998	An Officer and a Gentleman	Navy lieutenant Yi Sun-sin	
1999	The Boss	Kim Du-han	
1999	Queen	Joo Eui-jong	
1999	Days of Delight	Hong Hoon-jae	
2000	Bad Friends	Choi Ki-chul	
2000	MBC Best Theater "Dong-bo's Blue Bird"	Oh Dong-bo	
2001	Navy	Choi Min-sik	
2002	My Platoon Leader	Corporal Choi Jang-woo	
2003	Forever Love	Kim Jae-seob	
2003	The King's Woman	Lee Han-min	
2005	Three-Leaf Clover	Kang Chang-ryul	
2006	Love and Ambition	Park Tae-soo	
2007	My Husband's Woman	Lee Dong-ha	
2007	Thirty Thousand Miles in Search of My Son	Kang Kye-pil	
2008	I Am Happy	Lee Joon-soo	
2009	Dream	Park Jung-chul	
2011	Indomitable Daughters-in-Law	Moon Jin-woo	
2012	21st Century Family	Lee Sung-ki	
2012	May Queen	Yoon Jung-woo	
2012	Full House Take 2	Lee Joon	
2013	Pure Love	Ha Jung-woo	
2016	The Love Is Coming	Kim Sang-ho/Geum Bang-suk	
2017	Strongest Deliveryman	Na Han-tae	
2019	Fantasy Timing	Shim Jung	
2019	Gracious Revenge	Hong In-chul	
2022	Jinxed at First	Jeong secretary	
2023	Meant To Be	Yoon Yi-chang	

=== Film ===
Year	Title	Role
2000	Picture Diary	(cameo)
2007	Miracle on 1st Street	Tae-seok
2009	Fortune Salon	Joo-young's ex-husband (cameo)
2015	Fly High	Sam-reung
2024	The Killer's Game	Goyang

=== Variety show ===
Year	Title	Network	Notes
1994	TV 청년내각	MBC	공보처장관
1994	Graphic 100	MBC	Host
1994	Campus Song Festival	MBC	Host
1994	Sunday Sunday Night – Inside Life in the Theater	MBC	Host
1995	출발! 토요대행진	KBS2	Host
1995	Saturday Saturday Is Fun	MBC	Host
1995	Live TV Song 20	SBS	Host
1996	River Music Festival	MBC	Host
1997	Saturday Power Start	KBS2	
1997	Up All Night with Kim Seung-hyun	MBC	
1997	Sunday, Oh! Happy Day	SBS	Panelist
1998	Star! Video Jockey	SBS	Host
1998	Live Date 11	MBC	
1999	감성채널21	KBS2	Host
2003	Korean Lesson 1	KBS2	Host
2004	Tender-aged Rivals	MBC	Host
2009	Airport	tvN	Host
2011	Five Men's Delicious Party	Channel A	Host
2012	Dancing with the Stars - Season 2	MBC	Contestant
2013	Men's Stuff	jTBC	Host
2013	Splash	MBC	Contestant
2013	World Challenge – We Are Coming	SBS	
2014	Crying Fist: The Birth of a Hero	XTM	Judge
2014	기찬 처방전 100세 푸드	OBS	Host
2014	Car Talk Show S	Channel A	Host
2015–2016	Our Neighborhood Arts and Physical Education	KBS2	Cast (Episodes 125–143)
2016	Law of the Jungle in Tonga	SBS	Cast (Episodes 208–211)

=== Music video appearances ===
Year	Song title	Artist
2010	"Double Double"	Aurora
2012	"Hide and Seek"	Aurora

=== Radio program ===
Year	Title	Station	Notes
2008–2009	Mr. Radio with Lee Hoon and Ji Hyun-woo	KBS Cool FM	DJ

== Bibliography ==
Year	Title	Publisher
2009	Lee Hoon's Operation Lose Belly Fat	Random House Korea

== Awards and nominations ==
Year	Award	Category	Nominated work	Result
2006	SBS Drama Awards	Excellence Award, Actor in a Serial Drama	Love and Ambition	Won
2008	SBS Drama Awards	Excellence Award, Actor in a Serial Drama	I Am Happy	Nominated
2011	MBC Drama Awards	Excellence Award, Actor in a Serial Drama	Indomitable Daughters-in-Law	Nominated
