= Jokgu =

South Korean ball sport

- Hangul: 족구
- Hanja: 足球
- RR: jokgu
- MR: chokku

Jokgu (also called Korean-style footvolley) is a sport which combines aspects of association football and volleyball or tennis.

== History ==
Jokgu was invented by members of the Republic of Korea Air Force in 1960 as a way to promote exercise on military bases. Jokgu is very popular in Korea, with over one thousand teams in professional, school, & military leagues. It is also one of the most common ways to pass time in the military. Jokgu is just one of the many sports that were premiered at the 1st Annual Leisure Games in Chuncheon, Korea, in 2010. As interest in Jokgu has grown in America, teams joined together in 2011 to form a Jokgu league and a door to the world stage was opened.

== Rule ==
It can be described as a fusion of volleyball and soccer. The rules are similar to volleyball, but only your feet, shin, and head may have contact with the ball. Teams are made up of four people on each side of the net, and the height of the net is similar to tennis (1.1 meters). Players are allowed three contacts per side with one bounce between contacts. The playing area measures 16 x 7 meters. Each of the two teams has four starting players and three relievers. A game consists of three sets of 15 points each. The score is counted under the rally point system, under which one must have a two-point advantage to win a game. The ball for jokgu measures 20 centimeters in diameter and weighs 360 grams.

== See also ==
- Football tennis
- Footvolley
- Sepak takraw
