= Yang Hak-jin =

South Korean actor

- Born: Yang Hak-jin; 16 August 1991 (age 35); South Korea
- Other name: Hak-jin
- Education: Myongji University
- Occupations: Actor; model
- Years active: 2014–present
- Agent: TH company
- Known for: Clean with Passion for Now; Solomon's Perjury; Reset

Yang Hak-jin (Korean: 양학진; born 16 August 1991), sometimes credited mononymously as Hak-jin, is a South Korean actor and model. He is best known for his roles in Clean with Passion for Now, Solomon's Perjury and Reset.

== Biography and career ==
Yang Hak-jin was born on August 16, 1991, he was a former professional volleyball player for 10 years before a knee injury ended his career. He gained recognition after appearing in the sports variety show Cool Kiz on the Block in 2016. He made his acting debut in 2014 in drama Reset and later acted in the web drama Night Teacher, also in the Viki Original series Tong: Memories and the television dramas such as The Miracle and Solomon's Perjury.

== Filmography ==
=== Television series ===
Year	Title	Role	Ref.
2014	Reset	One of the men in the CCTV room	
2016	Tong: Memories	Kim Jin-woo	
2016	The Miracle	Han Gyo-seok	
2016	My Runway	Chun-shik	
2016	Solomon's Perjury	Kim Dong-hyun	
2017	My Father Is Strange	Yeon Tae-soo	
2018	Clean with Passion for Now	Lee Dong-hyun	
2018	Soul Driver	Si-wan	
2019	Standby Curator	Do Gyeong-ha	
2021	Heartbeat Broadcasting Accident	Seon Hyeon-woo	
2022	Never Give Up	Alex	

=== Web series ===
Year	Title	Role	Ref.
2025	Countdown to Death		

=== Film ===
Year	Title	Role	Ref.
2023	Love Reset	Woo-jung	
