= Yang Sang-guk =

South Korean comedian (born 1983)

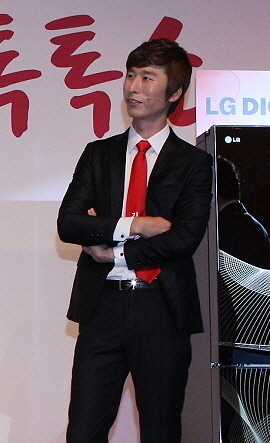
- Yang in 2012
- Born: October 1, 1983 (age 43); Gimhae, South Korea

Comedy career
- Years active: 2007–present
- Medium: Stand-up, television
- Genres: Observational, Sketch, Wit, Parody, Slapstick, Dramatic, Sitcom

Yang Sang-guk (born October 1, 1983) is a South Korean comedian. He first became famous as a cast member of the Korean comedy show Gag Concert, earning popularity with his "countrified" image.

== Biography ==
Yang Sang-guk was born in Jinyeong-eup, Gimhae, South Gyeongsang Province. Originally, his dream was to be a Buddhist monk, but he "couldn't give up joy" and chose to be a comedian. After completing his mandatory military service, Yang appeared in the comedy audition program Gag Hunting, performing a skit that was later adapted into the Gag Concert sketch "Seoulmate". The next year, he became one of 14 aspirants to pass KBS's 22nd comedian recruitment, and came to be known through his performance in Gag Concert's "I Bet on My Life" the same year.

In 2008, while Yang was working on another skit, Yoo Se-yoon and Lee Jong-hoon gave him a role in "Doctor Fish", as a passionate fan of Yoo's character. Though his role was minor, he grew popular for his unique intonation and attire, and reprised the role in "Bongsunga School". "Doctor Fish" ended on September 21, 2008, after which Yang took a 10-month hiatus. In 2011, he appeared in the sketch "Seoulmate", which he and Ryu Jeong-nam had shown off on Gag Hunting in 2005. Seo Su-min, Gag Concert's producer at the time, suggested bringing back the skit on his program. His humor using Korean dialect made him popular, and his catchphrase "궁디를 주차삐까" became a trend. Continuing his "rural" image, he appeared in "Four Guys" as a country bumpkin.
