= Park Seong-ho (comedian) =

South Korean comedian (born 1974)

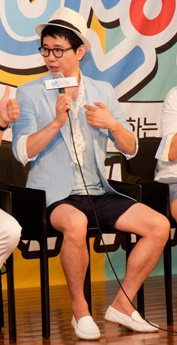
- Park at KBS Joy Hug Me Press conference
- Born: March 14, 1974 (age 52); Busan, South Korea
- Education: Cheongju University
- Occupation: Comedian
- Years active: 1997–present
- Agent: JS Entertainment
- Known for: Stand-up, Television comedy
- Notable work: Gag Concert
- Style: Observational, Sketch, Wit, Parody, Slapstick, Dramatic, Sitcom
- Spouse: Lee Ji-young

Korean name
- Hangul: 박성호
- Hanja: 朴成浩
- RR: Bak Seongho
- MR: Pak Sŏngho

Park Seong-ho (Korean: 박성호; born March 14, 1974) is a veteran South Korean comedian. He is best known as a comedian in KBS' Gag Concert and has participated in many variety shows. He won two Top Excellence Awards at the KBS Entertainment Awards as well as the Grand Prize in Variety at the Baeksang Arts Awards for his work in Gag Concert.

== Biography and career ==
Park Seongho was born in Busan, South Korea. He studied western painting and graduated from Cheongju University with a bachelor's degree. He married Lee Ji-young and has a son named Park Jeong-bin and daughter.

He is part of KBS' 13th class of comedians, passing the test in 1997 and debuting on Gag Concert in 2000, making him the comedian with the highest seniority on the show. He gained fame playing the popular character, "Gyaru Sang" and other segments on Gag Concert. He was a cast member for the first season of The Human Condition and the first sport (table tennis) on Cool Kiz On the Block. He also appeared on the latter show's first anniversary episode. He was a professor at Seoul National University in 2007.

== Filmography ==
=== Film ===
- Champion Mabbagi (2007) - the sportscaster
- Billy and the Brave Guys 3 (2014) - voice for 한국어, 목소리

=== Radio ===
- SBS Power FM Kim Chang-ryul's Old School (2006–2007)

=== Live performances ===
- 2015 KBS Family Comedy Concert in Busan (개그패밀리 콘서트 - 부산)

=== TV shows ===
- KBS 2 Days & 1 Night Season 3 (ep 38-39)
- KBS Comedy File
- KBS Comedy Stations
- KBS Full House
- KBS Cool Kiz on the Block
- KBS Good Country Campaign Headquarters
- KBS Human Condition
- KBS Show Laughing Day Good Day
- KBS Show! Lucky Train
- KBS The Gag Concert You've Never Seen Before
- KBS Video Champion
- KBS Joy Hug Me
- MBC It's a Gag
- MBC King of Mask Singer
- SBS Connect! Movie World
- SBS Global Taiyaki
- SBS Good Friends
- SBS Love Tonight
- SBS Smile People
- tvN Blue Tower
- ComedyTV Gag Survival UFG
- Channel A Now on My Way to Meet You

=== Gag Concert segments ===
2000–2006

- "Park Seong Ho's Music Talk" (2000)
- "Bongsunga School" (2001)
- "Revenge" (2002)
- "Youth White Papers" (2002)
- "Freeze" (2004)
- "Gag Power" (2004)
- "Legends of Hip Hop" (2004)
- "Bayside Shakedown" (2004)
- "허둥가라사대" (2004)
- "Never Stick" (2005)
- "사선에서" (2005)
- "Third World" (2005)
- "Professionalism" (2005)
- "복두신권" (2006)
- "Interview" (2006)
- "Karaoke Guru" (2006)
- "호구와 울봉이" (2006)

2007–2012

- "같기도" (2007)
- "Real Men" (2007)
- "Ad-lib News" (2007)
- "Ad-lib Brothers" (2007)
- "도움상회" (2008)
- "대포동 예술극단" (2008)
- "Music Gallery" (2008)
- "Ripple Broadcasting Booth" (2008)
- "Screwed TV" (2009)
- "BB Entertainment" (2009)
- "Affectionate Man's Rights Committee" (2009)
- "Choi Hyo-jong's Eyes" (2010)
- "Mantis Kindergarten" (2011)
- "Handsome CSI" (2011)
- "K-JOB Star" (2012)
- "War on Broadcasting" (2012)
- "School Of Mental Breakdown" (2012)
- "King of Comedy Park Seong-ho" (2012)

2013–present

- "Men's News" (2013)
- "I'm a Father" (2013)
- "Girls in the Army" (2013)
- "The Animals" (2013)
- "Go Jo Show" (2014)
- "Dating Skills Test" (2014)
- "No Big Difference" (2014)
- "Help Me!" (2014)
- "Owls" (2015)
- "Tour Guides" (2015)

== Albums ==
- 아니므니다 (Animunida) (2012)
- 벨보원 (2010)

== Awards and nominations ==
- 2013 Republic of Korea Culture and Entertainment Awards: Comedian Daesang
- 2010 Korea Broadcasting Awards Comedians Category: Appearance Award
- 2010 Baeksang Arts Awards: TV Entertainment: Best Variety Performer Award
- 2010 Korea PD Awards: Comedian Award
- 2009 KBS Entertainment Awards: Top Excellence Award
- 2004 KBS Entertainment Awards: Top Excellence Award
- 2001 Baeksang Arts Awards: Comedians Category: New Male Acting Award
- 1997 KBS New Male Comedian Acting Award
- 1994 Chungbuk National Art Exhibition

== Endorsements ==
=== Commercials ===
- KTB Securities
- LG U+ TV G
- Lotte Foods Color Power
- Mobilo Advertisement Model
- Netmarble Go!Go!Go! Racer
