= Choi Yun-hui =

South Korean swimmer (born 1967)

- 최윤희

2nd Vice Minister of Culture, Sports and Tourism
- In office 20 December 2019 – 23 December 2020
- President: Moon Jae-in
- Prime Minister: Lee Nak-yeon; Chung Sye-kyun
- Minister: Park Yang-woo
- Preceded by: Noh Tae-gang
- Succeeded by: Kim Jung-bae

Personal details
- Born: 1 September 1967 (age 59)
- Education: Yonsei University

Choi Yun-hui
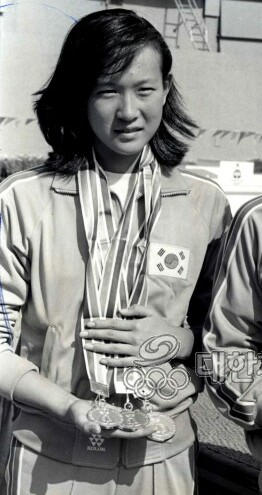

Personal information
- Born: 1 September 1967 (age 59)

Sport
- Sport: Swimming

- Choi Yun-hui
- Hangul: 최윤희
- Hanja: 崔允喜
- RR: Choe Yunhui
- MR: Ch'oe Yunhŭi

Choi Yun-hui (Korean: 최윤희; born 1 September 1967) is a South Korean swimmer who served as the 2nd Vice Minister of Culture, Sports and Tourism under President Moon Jae-in from 2019 to 2020. She is the first woman and second professional sports player to become deputy head of the Ministry or of its preceding agencies. She competed in two events at the 1984 Summer Olympics.

Choi is the younger sister of Choi Yun-jung (최윤정), who also competed internationally for South Korea in swimming. The two were nicknamed the "Seal Sisters", and were noted frequently for both breaking national backstroke records at the same time. Choi began learning to swim while in kindergarten through lessons at the YMCA. Both sisters attended Seoul National University Middle School, and represented their school in swimming at the national level. Following the 1984 Olympics, she won gold in the 100 m and 200 m backstroke at the 1986 Asian Games.

In 1987, she became the first South Korean model for the Japanese sports drink brand Pocari Sweat. In 2017, she was named the first ever woman to become board member of the Korean Sport & Olympic Committee.

Choi holds both a bachelor's and a master's degree from Yonsei University in physical education.
