= Lee Jong-hwa (actor) =

- Born: Lee Jong-hwa; February 15, 1994 (age 32); Busan, South Korea
- Other name: Jota
- Education: Dong Ji High School
- Occupations: Actor; singer; model
- Agent: King Kong by Starship
- Musical career
- Genres: K-pop; R&B; Hip hop
- Instrument: vocals
- Years active: 2014–present
- Labels: J. Tune Camp; GNI

Korean name
- Hangul: 이종화
- Hanja: 李鍾和
- RR: I Jonghwa
- MR: I Chonghwa

Lee Jong-hwa (born February 15, 1994), also known as Jota, is a South Korean actor, singer and model. He is a former member of South Korean boy group Madtown.

== Early life ==
In high school, Lee planned to become a professional judo competitor. However, an ankle injury ended that dream and he decided to pursue a career in entertainment instead.

In 2013, he was a backup dancer in Lee Hyori's "Bad Girls" music video and promotions.

== Career ==
Lee debuted with the South Korean boy group Madtown in October 2014, under his stage name Jota. In December 2015, he auditioned for Our Neighborhood Arts and Physical Education, where he was chosen for judo and was announced as the new ace due to his professional judo skills. He won many matches with experienced judo players. In early January 2016, it was confirmed that he would be a cast member of the Law of the Jungle in Tonga. In May 2016, he joined the fourth season of We Got Married, appearing alongside model Kim Jin-kyung.

In 2017, Madtown disbanded. In October 2018, it was announced that he signed an exclusive contract with King Kong by Starship to promote as an actor under his real name.

== Filmography ==
=== Variety show ===
Year	Title	Role	Notes
2015–2016	Let's Go! Dream Team Season 2	Fixed member	Jota won 2nd place in the episode 259, 1st place in 267, 278, 317, 329
2015–2016	Cool Kiz on the Block	Cast member	Judo (Episodes 131–143, 168, 170); Volleyball (Episodes 146–163); Wrestling (Episodes 166–167)
2016	Law of the Jungle in Tonga	Cast member	Episodes 203–207
2016	We Got Married	Cast member	with Kim Jin-kyung (Episodes 321–350)
2016	Real Men	Cast member	Manly Men Special
2016	King of Mask Singer	Contestant	as "Sexy Brain Scarecrow" (Episode 85)
2017	Idol Acting Competition – I'm an Actor	Main cast	Episode 1–12
2018	Law of the Jungle in Mexico	Cast member	Episodes 314–320

=== Drama ===
Year	Title	Role	Notes
2016	Weightlifting Fairy Kim Bok-joo	Choi Tae-hoon	Cameo (Episodes 1, 15)
2019	Touch Your Heart	Lee Jong-hwa	Intern Jong-hwa (Episode 8)
2019	The Running Mates: Human Rights	Lee Sung Woo	Cameo (Episodes 7, 8)

== Awards and nominations ==
Year	Award	Nominated work	Category	Result
2016	SBS Entertainment Awards	Law of the Jungle in Tonga	Bromance Best Couple Award (with Seo Kang-joon)	Nominated
2016	MBC Entertainment Awards	We Got Married	Best couple (with Kim Jin-kyung)	Nominated
