= Park Seong-hoe =

Seong Hoe Park
- Born: 1947 (age 78–79)
- Education: Seoul National University College of Medicine
- Known for: T cell-T cell interaction, Development of leukemic antigen, Antigen-specific T cell tolerance
- Awards: Pfizer Medical Research Award (1976); Emil von Behring Medical Award (1999); National Academy of Science Award (2001)
- Scientific career
- Fields: Immunology, Pathology
- Workplaces: Professor, Seoul National University College of Medicine

- Park Seong-hoe
- Hangul: 박성회
- RR: Bak Seonghoe
- MR: Pak Sŏnghoe

Seong Hoe Park (born October 3, 1947) is a South Korean immunologist and pathologist and a distinguished professor of pathology at the Seoul National University College of Medicine. He served as the chair of the Department of Pathology (2000–2004), the chair of the Graduate Program of Immunology (2002–2006), the president of Center for Animal Resource Development (2004–2006) at Seoul National University. He was the president of the Korean Association of Immunologists (2000–2001). Throughout his career as a T cell immunologist, Park established the theory of T cell-T cell interaction in human thymus, in which T cells expressing MHC class II drive previously unrecognized types of T cells and provide another significant developmental mechanism of T cells.

Another important achievement of his research is the induction of antigen-specific T cell tolerance, which has been a distant dream of immunologists for pinpoint-targeted control of the immune system. He successfully inhibited porcine pancreatic islet graft rejection in primates by preconditioning the host for the development of tolerogenic dendritic cells before the xenotransplantation (J Exp Med. 208:2477-2488, 2011). In this experiment, Park suggested a theoretical base of the prevention of graft rejection and the treatment of autoimmune diseases without serious complication. He also found the novel antigen JL1 on thymocytes, which has been developed as a therapeutic target for leukemia.

Today he is the director of the Transplantation Research Institute at the Seoul National University College of Medicine, and his team is conducting the basic research on the induction of T cell tolerance and the application of it to various immune diseases.

== Education ==
Seong Hoe Park was born in 1947 and spent his childhood in Incheon. He moved to Seoul and attended Seoul High School until the age of 18. He graduated from the Seoul National University College of Medicine in 1975 and received his PhD in Pathology from the same college in 1983. After his doctorate, he worked as a research fellow at the Harvard University Dana–Farber Cancer Institute.

== Work ==
As a professor of the department of pathology, he has investigated the developmental mechanism of T cells, particularly addressing the issues of human thymocytes distinct from mouse thymocytes. T cell has been believed to be developed only by thymocyte-thymic epithelial cell interaction in thymus, the “central dogma” in T cell development. However, he suggested the presence of another important developmental pathway of human T cells, denying the central dogma of developmental dependence of T cells on thymic epithelial cells. In 1992, Park found human fetal thymocytes expressed the class II major histocompatibility complex (MHC) molecules in contrast to mouse thymocytes (Hum Immunol. 33:294-298, 1992), and provided the first in vitro evidence that human thymocytes can interact with other thymocytes, possibly for T cell receptor recognition of T cell-derived peptides within MHC class II on neighboring thymocytes (Hum Immunol. 54:15-20, 1997). Since then, he has tried to demonstrate that thymocyte-thymocyte (or, T cell-T cell, so called T-T) interaction is really present and T cells can be developed by the interaction in vivo.

After almost 15 years, he finally established a delicately engineered mouse system in which T cells including thymocytes could expressed MHC class II molecules mimicking human T cells and successfully demonstrated that the T-T interaction occurred in the engineered murine thymus, resulting in the generation of functional CD4+ helper T cells (Immunity. 23:387-96, 2005). This work was supported by the data of another American research team (Immunity. 23:375-86, 2005), and contributed to the new line of research for the development of T cells of innate-like features (J Exp Med. 207:237-246, 2010). Based on this theory, he subsequently established humanized mouse system in which human T cells can develop via T cell-T cell interaction in the mouse.

During the same period, he was investigating the immune-modulating mechanism of dendritic cells. He screened the functional antigenic epitopes on dendritic cells, and found a novel epitope of ICAM-1. Through the development of an anti-ICAM1 antibody against the newly found epitope, he succeeded in inducing antigen-specific T cell tolerance via the development of tolerogenic semi-mature dendritic cells (J Exp Med. 208:2477-2488, 2011).

Applying this technology to the organ transplantation, his team extracted pancreatic islets from wild type pigs, and transplanted those into hepatic portal vein in non-human primates. His team treated the monkeys with the anti-ICAM1 epitope antibody before the xenotransplantation process, expecting the induction of immune-tolerance to the pancreatic antigens of other species in the non-human primates. This trial of xenotransplantation of pancreatic islets was proved to be a fantastic success, inhibiting graft rejection for almost a year. Park's work has been continued to the further researches on the possibilities of various clinical applications. To offer an extended therapeutic scope using the induction mechanism of immune tolerance, his team is investigating the possibilities of transplantation of various organs and treatment of autoimmune disease.

He also found the novel antigen JL1 expressed in thymocytes (J Exp Med. 178:1447-51, 1993). JL1 is a unique epitope of CD43 that is expressed only in immature leukocytes and leukemic cells, and a useful marker of acute leukemia. Based on this, follow-up experiments demonstrated that anti-JL1 antibody were able to effective eradicate leukemic cells.

As the director of Transplantation Research Institute and a distinguished professor of pathology at the Seoul National University College of Medicine, Park continues his study of T cell development, induction of immune tolerance, and their applications.

== Awards ==
- Park won the Pfizer Medical Research Award 1976 and was awarded the Emil von Behring Medical Award 1999.
- In 2001, Park was awarded the National Academy of Science Award for providing.
