= Lee Jong-soo =

South Korean actor

- Born: October 21, 1976 (age 49); Seoul, South Korea
- Occupation: Actor
- Years active: 1995–present

Korean name
- Hangul: 이종수
- RR: I Jongsu
- MR: I Chongsu

Lee Jong-soo (Korean: 이종수; born October 21, 1976) is a South Korean actor.

== Filmography ==
=== Film ===
Year	Title	Korean Title	Role
1997	Change	체인지	Cameo appearance
1998	First Kiss	키스할까요	Cameo appearance
2001	Kick the Moon	신라의 달밤	Min Jin-seob
2002	R.U. Ready?	아 유 레디?	Jeong Hyeon-woo
2003	Dying Puppy	강아지, 죽는다	Wan-su
2003	Sword in the Moon	청풍명월	Jae-deok
2004	Don't Tell Papa	돈텔파파	Cameo appearance
2004	3-Iron	빈집	Cameo appearance
2005	Tarzan Park Heung-Suk	무등산타잔, 박흥숙	Jeong Du‑su
2006	The World of Silence	조용한 세상	Detective Choi
2006	Arang	아랑	Dong-Min
2007	The Perfect Couple	최강 로맨스	Traffic cop
2011	The Showdown	혈투	Joseon army chief
2013	The Puppet	꼭두각시	Ji-Hoon
2015	Eagle Eye	독수리의 눈	Eagle Eye

=== Television series ===
Year	Title	Korean Title	Role	Network
1994	Partner	짝	Jong-soo	MBC
1996	The Most Beautiful Goodbye	세상에서 가장 아름다운 이별	Jung Jung-soo	MBC
2002	Bad Girls	나쁜 여자들	Na Bong-chul	SBS
2003	Breathless	나는 달린다	Yoon Eui-seob	MBC
2005	Rebirth: Next	환생: 넥스트	Min Ki-soo / Wan-bo / Kim Woong-seo / Tamura (Kim Doo-man) / Mok So-ho	MBC
2006	Yeon Gaesomun	연개소문	young Kim Yoo-shin	SBS
2007	Lee San, Wind of the Palace	이산	Park Dae-soo	MBC
2008	Daughter-in-Law	며느리와 며느님	Ma Kang-san	SBS
2009	Her Style	그녀의 스타일	Do Jin-woo	KBS1
2009	Jolly Widows	다함께 차차차	Lee Chul	KBS1
2010	Secret Agent Miss Oh	국가가 부른다	Oh Ha-na's boyfriend	KBS2
2010	The King of Legend	근초고왕	Buyeo Chan	KBS1
2012	Dream of the Emperor	대왕의 꿈	Kim Beob-min	KBS1
2014	Cunning Single Lady	앙큼한 돌싱녀	Man on blind date	MBC
2014	Into the Flames	불꽃속으로	Kim Sang-chul	TV Chosun
2014	Make Your Wish	소원을 말해봐	Jang Gyun-woo	MBC
2015	Songgot: The Piercer	송곳	Office worker	JTBC
2016	My Fair Lady	오 마이 금비	Ma Sang-soo	KBS2
2016	Bubbly Lovely	사랑은 방울방울	Yoon Dong-min	SBS

== Awards and nominations ==
Year	Award	Category	Nominated work	Result
2001	22nd Blue Dragon Film Awards	Best Supporting Actor	Kick the Moon	Nominated
2002	39th Grand Bell Awards	Best New Actor	Kick the Moon	Won
