= Madtown =

South Korean boy band

- Origin: Seoul, South Korea
- Genres: K-pop; R&B; dance-pop; Hip hop
- Years active: 2014–2017
- Labels: J. Tune Camp; GNI Entertainment
- Past members: Moos; Daewon; Lee Geon (Lee Woo); Jota; Heo Jun; Buffy; H.O
- Website: cafe.daum.net/madtown

Madtown (Korean: 매드타운), often stylized as MADTOWN, was a South Korean boy band formed in 2014 by J. Tune Camp. The group consisted of Moos, Daewon, Lee Geon, Jota, Heo Jun, Buffy and H.O. Their debut album, Mad Town, was released on October 6, 2014. Two of the members, Moos and Buffy, originally debuted as the hip hop duo Pro C in 2013. Madtown's official fan-base name is Mad-people. Starting December 22, 2016, Madtown's contract was sold to GNI Entertainment after J. Tune Camp closed. On The Unit, Daewon and Lee Geon confirmed Madtown's disbandment.

== History ==
=== 2014: Debut with Yolo and Mad TV ===
Earlier-generation groups such as g.o.d, Dynamic Duo and idol groups such as Sistar, VIXX, Secret, BTS, High4 and Jay Park held a banner which had 'Welcome to Mad Town' pasted on it, arousing curiosity and suspicion of whether it was an MBLAQ comeback, or the debut of a new boy group. On September 24, 2014, J. Tune Camp finally announced the debut of their second boy group through a teaser image. This marks J. Tune Camp's boy group debut after five years, and group debut after two years (before Two X left J. Tune Camp). During the next two days, J. Tune Camp started introducing its members, including Moos and Buffy who are members of Pro C which debuted earlier. They started off with three members (namely Moos, Daewon and Lee Geon) on the first day and the remaining four members (namely Jota, Heo Jun, Buffy and H.O) on the second day.

The Mad Town members themselves also explained the different style of music that they are specialised in as compared to their senior group and labelmate MBLAQ as well as the members' personalities when they sat down for an interview.

On October 1, J. Tune Camp uploaded their debut music video teaser on their official YouTube channel. Five days later, J. Tune Camp uploaded their debut music video Yolo on their official YouTube channel. On the same day, J. Tune Camp released their debut EP, titled Mad Town digitally. On October 9, they had their debut stage on M Countdown. After which, they released their debut album physically.

They were featured on Mad TV, a reality show which featured their everyday lives. It started through J. Tune Camp's official YouTube channel on October 30, 2014 and ended on January 30, 2015 including a special Delivery Season.

=== 2015: Welcome to Madtown and OMGT ===
On March 9, J. Tune Camp uploaded the music video teaser for their new song, "New World", on their official YouTube channel. Three days later, J. Tune Camp uploaded the full music video for "New World". On the same day, J. Tune Camp released their second mini album Welcome to Madtown digitally. On March 16, they released their second mini album physically. On November 12, they released their first digital single "OMGT", which stands for "Oh My God Thanks".

=== 2016: Emotion ===
On June 15, J. Tune Camp officially announced their comeback with a set of new teaser images for their third mini album, Emotion. The music video for the title track, "Emptiness", was released on June 21 at midnight KST, as well as the mini album itself.

=== 2017: New label, contract termination, and disbandment ===
In early 2017, Madtown's contract was sold to GNI Entertainment after the sudden closing of J. Tune Camp. On September 11, 2017, the members of Madtown filed for an injunction with the Seoul Central District Court against GNI Entertainment to end their exclusive contracts, after the CEO has been arrested for fraud and all of the staff members, including Madtown’s manager, were leaving the company. On November 8, 2017, the Seoul Central District Court ruled in favor of Madtown, stating that the terms of their contracts can no longer be enforced by GNI Entertainment.

On November 6, Madtown's legal representative announced that the group was preparing to disband. Daewon and Lee Geon joined the survival program The Unit. Jota and Heo Jun turned to acting, while Moos went to focus on DJ activities. On November 10, Buffy announced that he was enlisting in the military.

Daewon and Lee Geon confirmed Madtown's disband during an episode of The Unit.

== Members ==
- Moos (무스)
- Daewon (대원)
- Lee Geon (이건)/ Lee Woo (이우)
- Jota (조타)
- Heo Jun (허준)
- Buffy (버피)
- H.O (호)

== Discography ==
=== Extended plays ===
List of extended plays, with selected details, chart positions, sales, and certifications
Title	Details	Peak chart positions		Sales
Title	Details	KOR	JPN	Sales
Mad Town	Released: October 6, 2014; Label: J. Tune Camp; Formats: CD, digital download	11	—	KOR: 2,224+
Welcome to Madtown	Released: March 12, 2015; Label: J. Tune Camp; Formats: CD, digital download; Track listing: 1. Lalala; 2. New World (드루와); 3. Thinkin' About You (니가 필요한가봐); 4. I'm a Serious (심각해); 5. New World (드루와) inst.	7	—	KOR: 2,810+
Emotion	Released: June 21, 2016; Label: J. Tune Camp; Formats: CD, digital download; Track listing: 1. Intro; 2. Emptiness (빈칸); 3. Yah! (할래!) Lee Geon & Buffy duet.; 4. Move (비켜); 5. LIE	10	37	KOR: 5,658; JPN: 9,036
"—" denotes releases that did not chart or were not released in that region.

=== Single albums ===
Title	Details
OMGT	Released: November 12, 2015; Label: J. Tune Camp, LOEN Entertainment; Format: CD, digital download; Track listing: 1. OMGT; 2. OMGT (instrumental)

=== Singles ===
Title	Year	Album
"YOLO"	2014	MadTown
"New World"	2015	Welcome To MadTown
"OMGT"	2015	OMGT
"Emptiness"	2016	Emotion

=== Collaborations ===
Year	Title	Artist
2016	"Do You Know My Heart"	Rooftop House Studio, Madtown, and Wa$$up (feat. Yoo Jooyi)
2016	"Goodbye"	Badkiz's Monika (featuring Moos)

=== Soundtrack appearances ===
Year	Title	Artist	Album
2016	"Still" (여전히)	Lee Geon	동네의 영웅 OST Part 3 / Neighborhood Hero OST Part 3

== Filmography ==
=== Music videos ===
Year	Title	Album
2014	YOLO	Mad Town
2015	New World(드루와)	Welcome to Madtown
2015	BUFFY X Lee Geon - Candy Fluff	(Prod. By BUF)
2015	OMGT	OMGT
2016	Emptiness	Emotion
