= List of South Korean television series =

South Korean television series have become popular globally from the end of the 2000s onward.

Below is a partial list of notable South Korean television series and programmes across a variety of genres.

== News ==
=== General News ===
- JTBC Newsroom (JTBC 뉴스룸)
- KBS News 9 (KBS 뉴스9)
- KBS Morning News Time (KBS 아침 뉴스 타임)
- MBC Newsdesk (MBC 뉴스데스크)
- SBS 8 News (SBS 8시 뉴스)

Note: MBC Newsdesk and SBS 8 News are also aired on MBC Music MBC and SBS MTV SBS's music channels.

=== Showbiz News ===
- tvN eNews 9
- SBS Kstar News 840 (Pre-empted by local newscasts.)
- MBC Showbizdesk 840 (Pre-empted by local newscasts.)
- KBS Entertainment Relay (Weekly Show)
- Mnet Wide News

== Current affairs ==
=== Ombudsman and mass communication ===
- Arguments (썰전)
- Curious Story Y (궁금한 이야기 Y)
- Current Magazine 2580 (시사매거진 2580)
- Knowledge Channel e (지식채널 e)
- PD Notebook (PD 수첩)
- The Its Know (그것이 알고싶다)
- Vivid Sources of Information (생생정보통)
- VJ Trooper (VJ 특공대)
- X-files about Food (먹거리 X파일)

== Studio show ==
=== Comedy ===
- Comedy Big League (코미디빅리그)
- Comedy Revenge – redirect link
- Gag Concert (개그콘서트)
- Ha ttang sa (하땅사)
- People Looking for Laughter (웃음을 찾는 사람들) or Wootchatsa (웃찾사)
- Saturday Night Live Korea (새터데이 나이트 라이브 코리아)
- Star King (놀라운 대회 스타킹)

=== Cooking/Food ===
- 4 Wheeled Restaurant
- Baek Jong-won's Alley Restaurant
- Baek Jong-won's Food Truck
- Baek Jong-won's Top 3 Chef King
- Coffee Friends
- Cook Representative
- Crazy Recipe Adventure
- Culinary Class Wars
- Delicious Rendezvous
- Grandma's Restaurant in Samcheong-dong
- Jinny's Kitchen
- Kang's Kitchen
- Lee's Kitchen - by Na Yeong-seok PD
- Let's Eat Dinner Together
- Please Take Care of My Refrigerator
- Stars' Top Recipe at Fun-Staurant
- The Backpacker Chef
- The Best Cooking Secrets
- Three Meals a Day
- Three Meals for Four
- Youn's Kitchen

=== Game ===
- Elite League
- Society Game
- The Devil's Plan
- The Game Caterers
- X-Man (X맨 일요일이 좋다)

=== K-Pop Survival ===
- Boys24
- Boys Planet
- Build Up: Vocal Boy Group Survival
- Cap-teen (캡틴)
- Fantasy Boys
- Finding Momoland - redirect link
- Girls on Fire – redirect link
- Girls Planet 999
- Girls Reverse
- Hot Blooded Men
- Idol School
- I-Land
- I-Land 2: N/a
- Kara Project
- Kingdom: Legendary War
- K-pop Star
- K-Pop Star Hunt
- Loud
- Make Mate 1
- Mix & Match (믹스 앤 매치)
- Mix Nine
- My Teenage Girl
- No.Mercy
- Peak Time
- Produce 101
- Produce 101 Season 2
- Produce 48
- Produce X 101
- Queendom
- Queendom Puzzle
- R U Next?
- Road to Kingdom
- Sixteen
- Stray Kids (TV program)
- The Origin – A, B, Or What?
- The Second World
- The Unit: Idol Rebooting Project
- To Be World Klass
- Under Nineteen
- Universe League
- Universe Ticket
- V-1
- Wild Idol
- WIN: Who is Next
- YG Treasure Box - redirect link

=== Music ===
- 100 People, 100 Songs
- 1000 Song Challenge
- Begin Again
- Golden Oldies (KBS1 가요무대)
- I Can See Your Voice
- Immortal Songs
- Immortal Songs: Singing the Legend (불멸의 노래 2)
- Inkigayo (SBS 인기가요)
- Jung Jae-hyung & Lee Hyo-ri's You and I
- KBS Lee Hana's Peppermint (이하나의 페퍼민트)
- KBS Live Music Warehouse (라이브 음악창고)
- KBS Music Space (음악공감)
- KBS Yoon Do Hyun's loveletter (윤도현의 러브레터)
- Kim Jung-eun's Chocolate (김정은의 초콜릿)
- Korea Local Music Show (전국 노래자랑)
- M Countdown (Mnet) (M 카운트 다운)
- MBC Kim Dong Ryul's For You (김동률의 포 유)
- MBC Music Camp (음악캠프)
- MBC Music Travel LaLaLa (음악 여행 라라라)
- Miss Trot
- Mr. Trot
- Music Bank (KBS) (뮤직뱅크)
- Music and Lyrics (음악 및 가사)
- Music Spotlight
- SBS Music Space (음악공간)
- SBS Music Wave (뮤직웨이브)
- Sea of Hope
- Show! Music Core (MBC) (쇼! 음악중심)
- Show Me the Money
- Superstar K (Mnet) (슈퍼스타 K)
- The Voice Kids
- The Voice of Korea
- Trot X
- Unpretty Rapstar
- You Hee-Yeol's Sketchbook

=== Entertainment ===
- KBS Entertainment Broadcast Show (KBS 연예가중계)
- SBS TV Entertainment Show (SBS TV 연예)
- Section TV (섹션TV 연예통신)

=== Sports ===
- KBS Sports World (스포츠 세상)
- Top Gear Korea
- Viva! K-League (비바 K리그)

=== Talk show ===
- Circle House
- Dissatisfaction Zero (불만제로)
- Find Delicious TV (찾아라! 맛있는 TV)
- Global Talk Show (미녀들의 수다)
- Go Show
- Golden Fishery
- Hwasin: Controller of the Heart
- I Am a Man (나는 남자다)
- King of Mask Singer (미스터리 음악쇼 복면가왕)
- Non-Summit (비정상회담)
- Radio Star (라디오스타)
- Lotto Show (SBS 생방송 브라보 나눔로또)
- Moonlight Prince
- Shocking of the World (순간포착 세상에 이런일이)
- Sponge (스펀지)
- Strong Heart (강심장)

=== Variety ===
- 1 Percent of Friendship
- 2 Days & 1 Night (1박2일)
- 24/365 BY BLACKPINK
- 2NE1 TV
- 2PM Show!
- 2PM Wild Beat
- 8 vs 1
- All the K-pop
- Animals (South Korean TV series)
- Apink's Showtime (에이핑크의 쇼타임) - redirect link
- Babel 250
- Barefooted Friends (맨발의 친구들)
- Battle Trip
- Be Stupid
- Beat Coin
- Beast's Showtime (쇼타임: 버닝 더 비스트)
- Beatles Code Season 2
- BLACK CAST
- Blackpink House
- Boss in the Mirror
- Boyfriend's W Military Academy
- Boys and Girls Music Guide
- Bragging Room Guest
- Brave Family
- BTS In the Soop
- Busted!
- Carefree Travelers (뭉쳐야 뜬다)
- Celebrity Bromance
- Change Days
- Cheongchun FC Hungry Eleven
- Come to Play (놀러와)
- Dad! Where Are We Going? (아빠! 어디가?)
- Dancing 9 (댄싱9)
- Duet Song Festival (듀엣가요제)
- DoReMi Market (도레미 마켓)
- Enemy of Broadcasting
- Exchange (TV program)
- EXID's Showtime
- EXO's Showtime (엑소의 쇼타임)
- Factory Girl (reality show)
- Family Outing (패밀리가 떴다)
- Finding SKZ
- Fun & Joy
- Gag Star
- Get it Beauty
- Gfriend x Mamamoo's Showtime
- Girls High School Mystery Class
- Girls' Generation Goes to School
- Going Seventeen
- Goldfish (황금어장)
- Gomak Boys
- Good Sunday (일요일이 좋다)
- Grandpas Over Flower
- Great Escape
- HaHa-Mong Show
- Happy Sunday (해피선데이)
- Happy Together (해피투게더)
- Heart Signal
- Hello Baby
- Hello Counselor
- Heroes
- His Man
- Hit the Stage
- House on Wheels
- Hyori's Homestay
- I Live Alone (나 혼자 산다)
- Idol Battle
- Idol Master
- Idol Room (아이돌룸)
- Idol School
- Idol Show
- Image Fighter 2013
- In the Soop: Friendcation
- Infinite Challenge (무한도전)
- Infinite's Showtime
- Invincible Youth (청춘불패)
- It's Dangerous Beyond the Blankets
- JJANG!
- K-Pop Star Hunt
- Kara Bakery
- Knowing Bros (아는 형님)
- Korea's Got Talent
- Korea Number One (코리아넘버원)
- Lee Hyo Ri's X sister
- Let Me In
- Let's Go! Dream Team (출발 드림팀)
- Let's Go! Dream Team Season 2
- Life Bar
- Little Forest
- Love & Hate
- Love Catcher
- M-GIGS
- M;terview
- M Tunes
- Merry Queer
- Master in the House
- Master Key
- MLive
- Mnet Special
- Mnet Star
- Nana Tour
- NCT Life
- New World
- New Journey to the West
- Nicole The Entertainer's Introduction to Veterinary Science
- Night Star
- Nineteen to Twenty
- Oh! Brothers (오! 부라더스)
- Oh! My School
- Our Neighborhood Arts and Physical Education (우리동네 예능과 체육의 능력자) / (Cool Kiz on the Block)
- Photo Camping Video Log
- Physical: 100
- Pink Lie
- Please Take Care of My Refrigerator (냉장고를 부탁해)
- Prison Life of Fools
- Rain Effect
- Real Homme
- Real Man (진짜 사나이)
- Roommate
- Run BTS
- Running Man (런닝맨)
- Screwballs
- Secret (비밀)
- Sesame Player
- Seventeen In the Soop
- Shinhwa Broadcast
- Show!terview
- Single's Inferno
- Sistar's Showtime - redirect link
- Sister's Slam Dunk (언니들의 슬램덩크)
- Sisters Over Flowers
- Siren: Survive the Island
- Sixth Sense
- Spring, Summer, Fall, Winter Forest
- Star Golden Bell (스타골든벨)
- Street Man Fighter
- Street Woman Fighter
- Suchwita
- Sunday Night (일요일 일요일 밤에)
- Super Junior's Super TV
- Superhit
- Super Idol Chart Show
- Sweet Girl (Chuseok Special)
- Talking Street (말하는대로)
- Taxi: The Talk Show
- The Return of Superman
- The Romantic & Idol
- The Zone: Survival Mission
- This Is Infinite
- Twogether
- Twice TV
- Unexpected Business
- Village Survival, the Eight
- Wanna One Go
- We Got Married (우리 결혼했어요)
- Weekly Idol
- Wild Bunny
- Win Win (승승장구)
- WINNER TV
- Wook Talk
- Wonder Bakery
- X-Man
- Youn's Stay
- Young Actors' Retreat
- Youth Over Flowers
- Zombieverse - redirect link

== Special events ==
- KBS Drama Awards (KBS 연기대상)
- KBS Song Festival (KBS 가요대상)
- MBC Drama Awards (MBC 연기대상)
- MBC Entertainment Awards (MBC 방송연예대상)
- MBC University Music Festival (MBC 대학가요제)
- SBS Drama Awards (SBS 연기대상)

== Documentary ==
- KBS History Special (KBS 역사 스페셜)
- KBS Special (KBS 스페셜)
- MBC Special (MBC 스페셜)
- SBS Special (SBS 스페셜)

== Voice-overs ==
=== TV edition movie ===
- KBS Movie Theatre (KBS 명화극장)
- KBS Saturday Movie (KBS 토요명화)
- MBC Friday Movie Heaven (MBC 금요영화천국)
- MBC Weekend of Movie (MBC 주말의 명화)
- SBS Cine Club (SBS 씨네클럽)
- SBS Movie Express (SBS 영화특급)

== See also ==
- List of South Korean broadcasting networks
- List of programs broadcast by Arirang TV
- List of programmes broadcast by the Korean Broadcasting System
- List of programs broadcast by MBC TV
- List of programs broadcast by Seoul Broadcasting System
- List of programs broadcast by JTBC
- List of programs broadcast by tvN (South Korean TV channel)
