= Paik's Mysterious Kitchen =

South Korean television show

- Promotional poster
- Also known as: Baek Jong-won's Mystery Kitchen
- Genre: Variety, Cooking
- Starring: Baek Jong-won; Kim Sung-joo; Kim Hee-chul
- Country of origin: South Korea
- Original language: Korean
- No. of episodes: 2

Production
- Production location: South Korea

Original release
- Network: SBS
- Release: May 18 – May 25, 2019

Paik's Mysterious Kitchen (Korean: 백종원의 미스터리 키친) is a South Korean show. It airs on SBS., following Baek Jong-won's Top 3 Chef King and Baek Jong-won's Food Truck after the Baek Jong-won's Alley Restaurant, the fourth part of the Baek Jong-won series. The programs were broadcast on May 18 and 25, 2019.

== Broadcast time ==
Broadcast period	Airtime		Type
May 18, 2019 – May 25, 2019	Saturday		Pilot
May 18, 2019 – May 25, 2019	1	18:40－17:30	Pilot
May 18, 2019 – May 25, 2019	2	17:30－18:10	Pilot

== Format ==
Mysterious Kitchen is a new cooking show featuring elements of mystery. Each week, two mysterious chefs cook their own signature dish in four-walled kitchens. Baek Jong-won, the famous businessman and food expert, and Kim Hee-chul, a K-pop star/food enthusiast, guess who the chef is based on various clues: how to understand ingredients, what technique they use, how to handle the fire, etc. Then, five culinary experts taste the finished dishes and vote for the winner. The show will entertain you by showing the masterful culinary skills, providing a vicarious satisfaction on delicious food, and making you solve the mystery. Plus, you can get the recipe for the winning dish.

== Program list ==
Episode	Broadcast date	Food Evaluation Group	Rating
Pilot	May 18, 2019	Lee Yeon-bok, Lee Won-il, Fabrizio Ferrari, Yoo Min-ju, Park Sang Hyun	3.8%
Pilot	May 25, 2019	Lee Yeon-bok, Lee Won-il, Fabrizio Ferrari, Yoo Min-ju, Park Sang Hyun	4.3%
