= Naju Gomtang Hayanjib =

Historic restaurant in Naju, South Korea

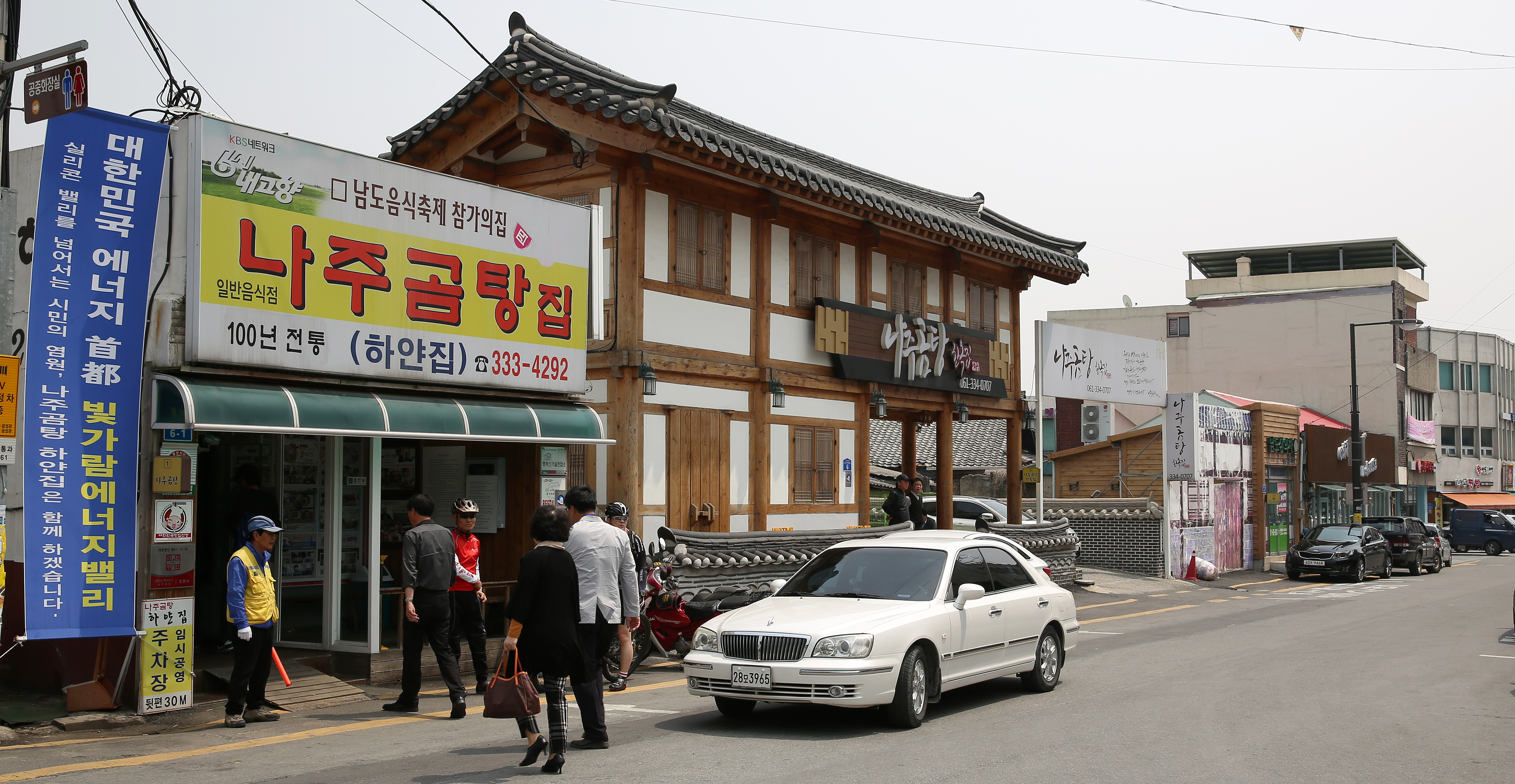
- Interactive map of Naju Gomtang Hayanjib

Restaurant information
- Established: 1910; 116 years ago
- Food type: Korean cuisine, Naju gomtang
- Location: 6-1 Geumseonggwan-gil, Naju, South Jeolla Province, South Korea
- Coordinates: 35.0322°N 126.7170°E
- Website: hayanjib.com

Naju Gomtang Hayanjib (Korean: 나주곰탕 하얀집), or Hayanjib for short, is a historic restaurant in Naju, South Korea. It is among the oldest active restaurants in South Korea, having been founded in 1910. It specializes in the local dish Naju gomtang, and now operates several branches in multiple locations.

== Description ==
The restaurant was first established in 1910 by Won Pan-rye (원판례) as Ryumun Sikdang (류문식당). The restaurant has since consistently remained in the family. Won was succeeded by Im I-sun (임이순), then by Gil Han-su (길한수), then by Gil Hyeong-seon (길형선). Gil Han-su died from lung cancer; this was possibly due to the use of yeontan (charcoal briquettes) to boil the stew. After Gil Hyeong-seon took over the business, he made a point of updating the facility to avoid the use of such fuels. The restaurant has also since expanded to multiple locations. Various family members operate each of the branches.

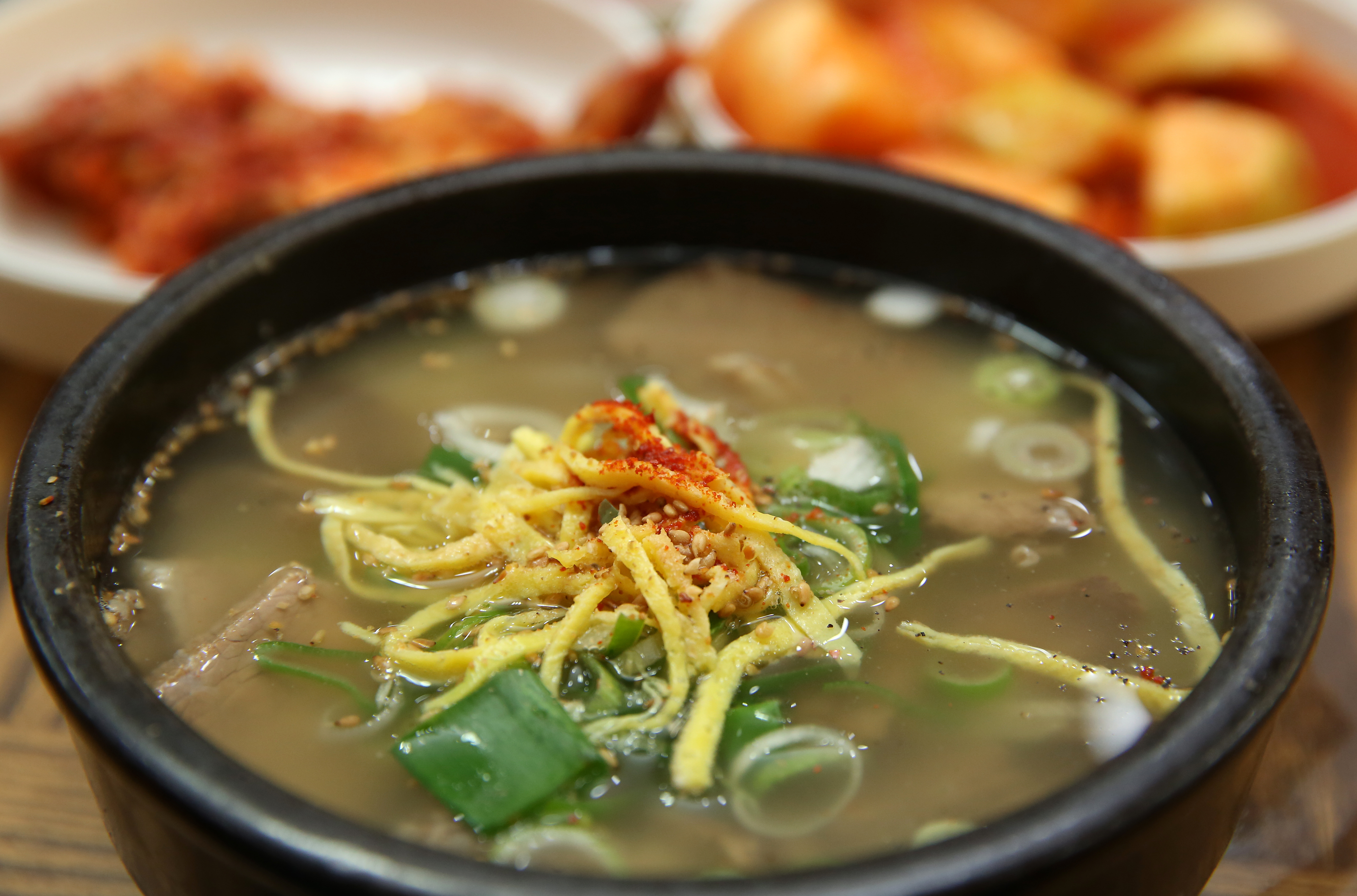
Naju gomtang served in the restaurant

Unlike the opaque milky broth of regular gomtang, which derives its color from the beef bones used to make the broth, Naju gomtang is translucent, as only meat is used to make it. The broth reportedly begins to be boiled at 2 a.m. on each day. Oils and other materials are skimmed off the top, to make the broth clearer and lighter. Meat is added to the broth, and the dish is served in an insulating onggi (earthenware) bowl. The dish is served with various side dishes, including their in-house kkakdugi and kimchi. Other dishes are also offered, including suyuk gomtang (pork-based gomtang).

According to the restaurant's head, the restaurant typically sells around 1,000 bowls per day, and has sold up to 2,500. The show has featured on the television program Baek Jong-won's Top 3 Chef King.

== See also ==
- Imun Seolnongtang – oldest restaurant in South Korea
- Eunhosikdang – another historic gomtang restaurant, in Seoul
