= 2020 MBC Entertainment Awards =

20th edition of award ceremony

- Title card
- Date: December 29, 2020
- Site: MBC Public Hall, Sangam-dong, Mapo-gu, Seoul
- Hosted by: Jun Hyun-moo; Jang Do-yeon; Ahn Bo-hyun

Highlights
- Grand Prize: Yoo Jae-suk

Television coverage
- Network: MBC
- Ratings: 7.3% (nationwide)

The 2020 MBC Entertainment Awards, presented by Munhwa Broadcasting Corporation (MBC), took place on December 29, 2020, at the MBC Public Hall in Sangam-dong, Mapo-gu, Seoul. The ceremony was hosted by Jun Hyun-moo, Jang Do-yeon and, Ahn Bo-hyun. It was broadcast on December 29, 2020, at 20.45 KST.

== Nominations and winners ==
(Winners denoted in bold)
(Nominations)

Grand Prize (Daesang)	Entertainer of the Year Award	Program of the Year
**Yoo Jae-suk**; Park Na-rae; Kim Sung-joo; Lee Young-ja; Kim Gu-ra; Jun Hyun-moo	**Park Na-rae**; **Kim Sung-joo**; **Lee Young-ja**; **Kim Gu-ra**; **Yoo Jae-suk**; **Jun Hyun-moo**	**Hangout with Yoo**; Where is My Home; I Live Alone; Radio Star; The Paikfather; King of Mask Singer; Those Who Cross the Line; Buddy Into the Wild; Omniscient Interfering View; The People of Trot
Top Excellence Award
Variety Category	Music/Talk Category	Radio Category
Male		**Jung Sun-hee** **– Jung Sun-hee, Moon Chun-sik's Age of Radio**
**Sung Hoon** **– I Live Alone**; Noh Hong-chul – Where is My Home; Seol Min-seok – Those Who Cross the Line; Yoo Byung-jae – Those Who Cross the Line, Omniscient Interfering View; Lee Si-eon – I Live Alone	**Yang Se-hyung** **– The Paikfather, Where is My Home, Omniscient Interfering View**; Kim Gook-jin – Radio Star; Kim Hyun-cheol – King of Mask Singer, The People of Trot	**Jung Sun-hee** **– Jung Sun-hee, Moon Chun-sik's Age of Radio**
Female		**Jung Sun-hee** **– Jung Sun-hee, Moon Chun-sik's Age of Radio**
**Hwasa** **– I Live Alone, Hangout with Yoo**; Kim Sook – Where is My Home; Song Eun-i – Omniscient Interfering View; Han Hye-jin – I Live Alone	**Lee Hyo-ri** **– Hangout with Yoo**; Shin Bong-sun – King of Mask Singer; Ahn Young-mi – Radio Star	**Jung Sun-hee** **– Jung Sun-hee, Moon Chun-sik's Age of Radio**
Excellence Award
Variety Category	Music/Talk Category	Radio Category
Male		**Lee Yoon-seok** – **Lee Yoon-suk and Jeon Young-mi’s Good Weekend**; **Lee Ji-hye – Lee Ji Hye’s Afternoon Discovery**
**Boom** **– Where is My Home, Buddy Into the Wild**; Ahn Jung-hwan – Buddy Into the Wild; Jang Dong-min – Where is My Home	**Kim Jong-min** **– Hangout with Yoo, Those Who Cross the Line, The People of Trot**; Rain – Hangout with Yoo; Lee Sang-min – The People of Trot; Jung Jae-hyung – Hangout with Yoo; Tak Jae-hoon – The People of Trot; Kwanghee – Hangout with Yoo	**Lee Yoon-seok** – **Lee Yoon-suk and Jeon Young-mi’s Good Weekend**; **Lee Ji-hye – Lee Ji Hye’s Afternoon Discovery**
Female		**Lee Yoon-seok** – **Lee Yoon-suk and Jeon Young-mi’s Good Weekend**; **Lee Ji-hye – Lee Ji Hye’s Afternoon Discovery**
**Son Dam-bi – I Live Alone**; **Jang Do-yeon** – **I Live Alone**; Kyung Soo-jin – I Live Alone; Jeong Yu-mi – Those Who Cross the Line; Hong Hyun-hee – Omniscient Interfering View	**Jessi** – **Hangout with Yoo, Omniscient Interfering View**; **Uhm Jung-hwa** **– Hangout with Yoo**; Kolleen Park – The People of Trot; Lee Eun-mi – The People of Trot	**Lee Yoon-seok** – **Lee Yoon-suk and Jeon Young-mi’s Good Weekend**; **Lee Ji-hye – Lee Ji Hye’s Afternoon Discovery**
Rookie Award
Variety Category		Radio Category
Male	Female	**Kang Susie** **– Standard FM (Wonderful Radio Kang Susie)**; **Jun Hyo-seong** **– FM4U (Jun Hyo-seong's Dreaming Radio)**; **Pyo Chang-won** **– Standard FM (Pyo Chang-won's News High Kick)**
**Kim Kang-hoon** **– King of Mask Singer, Those Who Cross the Line, Omniscient Interfering View**; Kim Soo-chan – The People of Trot; Ahn Bo-hyun – I Live Alone; Chani – Show! Music Core; Hyunjin – Show! Music Core	**Go Eun-ah** **– Omniscient Interfering View**; Kum Jan-di – The People of Trot; Kim Min-ju – Show! Music Core; Yoyomi – The People of Trot	**Kang Susie** **– Standard FM (Wonderful Radio Kang Susie)**; **Jun Hyo-seong** **– FM4U (Jun Hyo-seong's Dreaming Radio)**; **Pyo Chang-won** **– Standard FM (Pyo Chang-won's News High Kick)**
Best Writer of the Year Award		Scriptwriter of the Year
Radio	Current Events and Cultural Programs	Scriptwriter of the Year
**Kim Kyung-ok – Bae Cheol-soo's Music Camp**	**Park Min-jung – Humanimal**	**Choi Hye-jung – Hangout with Yoo**
Popularity Award	Digital Content Award	Best Dresser Award
**Ahn Young-mi** **– Radio Star**	**Park Na-rae, Hwasa, Han Hye-jin – Home Alone: Girls' Secret Party**	**Norazo – The Paikfather, Omniscient Interfering View**
Best Teamwork Award	PD Award	Achievement Award
**Omniscient Interfering View**	**Baek Jong-won** **– The Paikfather**	**Kim Gook-jin** **– Radio Star**
Best Couple Award	Special Award	Radio Contribution Award
**Yoo Jae-suk and Lee Hyori** **– Hangout with Yoo**; Kim Gu-ra and Ahn Young-mi – Radio Star; Kim Jong-min and Jung Jae-hyung – Hangout with Yoo; Baek Jong-won and Yang Se-hyung – The Paikfather; Bi-ryong and Lee Hyo-ri – Hangout with Yoo; Sung Hoon and Son Dam-bi – I Live Alone; Lee Young-ja and Jun Hyun-moo – Omniscient Interfering View	**The People of Trot**	**GS Caltex**
**Yoo Jae-suk and Lee Hyori** **– Hangout with Yoo**; Kim Gu-ra and Ahn Young-mi – Radio Star; Kim Jong-min and Jung Jae-hyung – Hangout with Yoo; Baek Jong-won and Yang Se-hyung – The Paikfather; Bi-ryong and Lee Hyo-ri – Hangout with Yoo; Sung Hoon and Son Dam-bi – I Live Alone; Lee Young-ja and Jun Hyun-moo – Omniscient Interfering View	Special Award for Current Events and Cultural Programs	Best Format Award
**Yoo Jae-suk and Lee Hyori** **– Hangout with Yoo**; Kim Gu-ra and Ahn Young-mi – Radio Star; Kim Jong-min and Jung Jae-hyung – Hangout with Yoo; Baek Jong-won and Yang Se-hyung – The Paikfather; Bi-ryong and Lee Hyo-ri – Hangout with Yoo; Sung Hoon and Son Dam-bi – I Live Alone; Lee Young-ja and Jun Hyun-moo – Omniscient Interfering View	**Kim Han-seok, Kim Jung-geun, Park Yeon-kyung – Good Day**	**King of Mask Singer**
**Yoo Jae-suk and Lee Hyori** **– Hangout with Yoo**; Kim Gu-ra and Ahn Young-mi – Radio Star; Kim Jong-min and Jung Jae-hyung – Hangout with Yoo; Baek Jong-won and Yang Se-hyung – The Paikfather; Bi-ryong and Lee Hyo-ri – Hangout with Yoo; Sung Hoon and Son Dam-bi – I Live Alone; Lee Young-ja and Jun Hyun-moo – Omniscient Interfering View	Special Award for Radio	
**Yoo Jae-suk and Lee Hyori** **– Hangout with Yoo**; Kim Gu-ra and Ahn Young-mi – Radio Star; Kim Jong-min and Jung Jae-hyung – Hangout with Yoo; Baek Jong-won and Yang Se-hyung – The Paikfather; Bi-ryong and Lee Hyo-ri – Hangout with Yoo; Sung Hoon and Son Dam-bi – I Live Alone; Lee Young-ja and Jun Hyun-moo – Omniscient Interfering View	**Im Jin-mo – Bae Cheol-soo's Music Camp**; **Kim Eun-ae – 57 Minute Traffic Report, Weather and Life**	

== Presenters ==
Order	Presenter	Award	Ref.
1	Ahn Young-mi and Jang Sung-kyu	Rookie Awards	
2	Kim Eana and Park Moon-chi	Scriptwriter of the Year	
3	Seunghee and Kwanghee	Best Dresser Award	
3	Seunghee and Kwanghee	Digital Content Award	
4	Kyung Soo-jin and Henry	Best Format Award	
5	Kim Kang-hoon and Yoo Jae-suk	Special Award	
5	Kim Kang-hoon and Yoo Jae-suk	Popularity Award	
6	Son Dam-bi and Kian84	Best Teamwork Award	
7	Uhm Jung-hwa and Jung Jae-hyung	Achievement Award	
8	Yang Se-hyung and Boom	Best Couple Award	
9	Go Eun-ah and Yoo Byung-jae	Excellence Awards (Radio and Music/ Talk)	
10	Song Ha-yoon and Lee Jun-young	Excellence Awards (Variety)	
11	Sung Hoon and Kim Sook	PD Award	
12	Kim Kwang-gyu and Yook Joong-wan	Program of the Year	
13	Noh Sa-yeon and Yunho	Top Excellence Awards (Radio and Music/Talk)	
14	Kim Jong-min and Jessi	Top Excellence Awards (Variety)	
15	Park Na-rae and Jo In-sung	Grand Prize (Daesang)	

== Special performances ==
Order	Artist	Song/Spectacle	Ref.
1	Jang Do-yeon with Aiki	Invitation (Original: Uhm Jung-hwa)	
2	Norazo	Bread (Original: Norazo)	
3	Mamamoo	Dingga (Original: Mamamoo)	

== See also ==
- 2020 KBS Entertainment Awards
- 2020 SBS Entertainment Awards
