= Paik Jong-won =

South Korean restaurateur (born 1966)

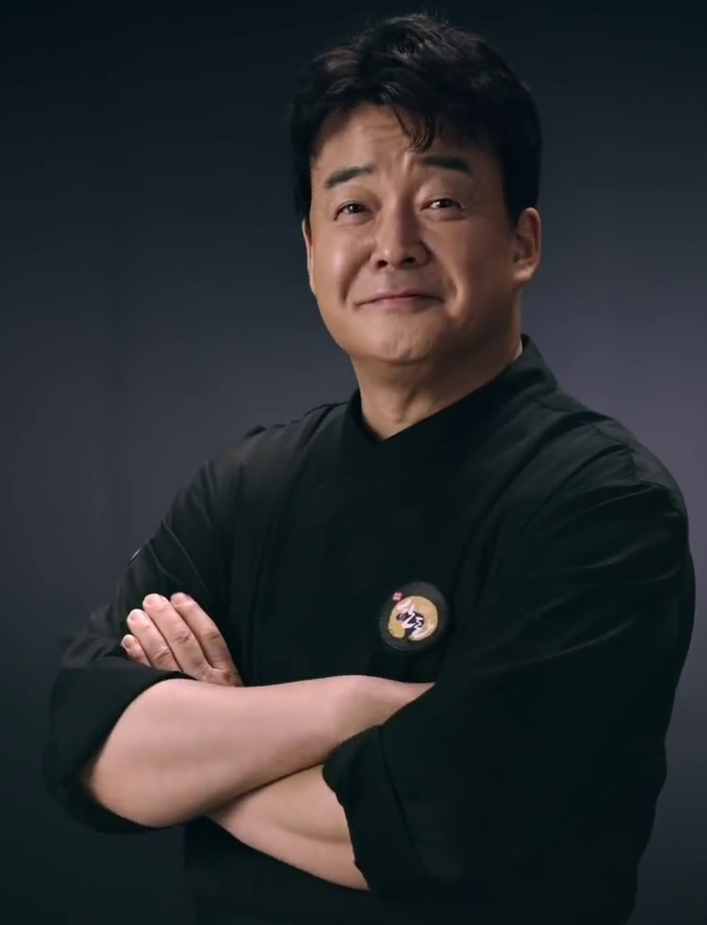
- Born: September 4, 1966 (age 60); Yesan County, South Chungcheong Province, South Korea
- Education: Seoul High School; Yonsei University (Dept. of Social Welfare)
- Occupations: Restaurateur, entrepreneur
- Spouse: So Yoo-jin (m. 2013)
- Children: 3
- Culinary career
- Cooking style: Korean cuisine
- Current restaurants
- Bornga; Baek's Coffee; Baek's Bibim; Baek's Pan; Saemaul Sikdang
- Website: www.theborn.co.kr

Korean name
- Hangul: 백종원
- Hanja: 白種元
- RR: Baek Jongwon
- MR: Paek Chongwŏn

Paik Jong-won (Korean: 백종원; born September 4, 1966), sometimes spelled Baek Jong-won, is a South Korean businessman. In television, he is known as the main host of the cooking television series Baek Jong-won's Top 3 Chef King (2015–2017), Baek Jong-won's Food Truck (2017), Baek Jong-won's Alley Restaurant (2018–2021), and one of two main judges in the cooking competition Netflix series Culinary Class Wars (2024).

== Personal life ==
Baek Jong-won was born on September 4, 1966, in Yesan County, South Chungcheong Province, South Korea. He was interested in food since he was a child. When he was an elementary school student, he was given some biscuits, but he had to fry them with butter and sprinkle them with sugar. He said his father was also a picky eater, which made him more interested in cooking. When he was a student, his father would buy ten hamburgers at a time on his way home after a business trip. Baek Jong-won would try different recipes to make the hamburgers taste better. It was from then that he started to cook.

Baek married actress So Yoo-jin on January 19, 2013. Their first child, a son, was born on April 9, 2014. Their second child, a daughter, was born on September 21, 2015. Their third child, a daughter, was born on February 8, 2018.

== Career ==
Baek has hosted a number of cooking television shows, including Baek Jong-won's Top 3 Chef King, Baek Jong-won's Food Truck, and Baek Jong-won's Alley Restaurant. In 2021, he produced his own original series Baek Spirit, with Netflix.

He is also the CEO of Theborn Korea Inc, 26 restaurant franchises with 1,299 branches across the country including Saemaul Sikdang, Baek's Coffee, and Baek's Bibim.

In December 2024, Korea Economic Daily reported that Baek and Jin plan to launch a new ready-to-drink liquor brand, Igin, through Yesan Doga, the agricultural corporation the two established and affiliate of Baek's Theborn Korea. Igin will incorporates the characteristics and local produce of Yesan, hometown of Baek. Igin Apple Gin, a 40%-ABV distilled liquor made from Korean rice and apples, will reportedly spearhead the brand, along with two ready-to-drink cocktail varieties at 4% ABV each: a tangy apple and plum flavored drink and a sweet apple and watermelon drink. The brand's Instagram page features photos of colorful packaging and limited release dates.

On January 17, 2025, Paik introduced a promotion through his YouTube channel Paik Jong-won where he announced that a gift set consisting of nine 200-gram packs of Paik-Ham would be sold on Theborn Korea's online shopping mall, Theborn Mall, at a 45% discount, reduced from the regular price of 51,900 won to 28,500 won, until the 21st. However, the company faced criticism for the high price and low ham content of the product. Theborn Korea's market capitalization fell by more than 38 billion won, recording its first-ever decline for seven consecutive trading days since listing.

On March 13, 2025, a controversy concerning the origin of ingredients was raised. There were allegations that the Hanshin Pocha Spicy Stir-Fried Octopus sold on The Born Korea's online store, The Born Mall, used garlic imported from China. The Born Korea had previously stated that the product contains domestic green onions, onions, and garlic. As the controversy escalated, the product page for the Hanshin Pocha Spicy Stir-Fried Octopus was removed from The Born Mall. Paik and The Born Korea issued an apology, claiming that they did not fully understand the relevant regulations, and are now reviewing their production methods and considering measures to ensure full compliance with the law.

In reaction to the various controversies surrounding him, Paik announced his retirement from the broadcasting industry, and said that he will be "focusing his passion and energy on the growth of The Born Korea, as an entrepreneur rather than an entertainer."

However, in November 2025, Paik has been reported to have returned to the broadcasting industry with programs such as Chef in Antarctica, followed by Culinary Class Wars 2, and CEO Paik's Global Food Venture 3, along with the erasure of his YouTube video announcing his retirement. Paik has denied these allegations, claiming that he has no plans of returning to the broadcasting industry.

== Filmography ==
=== Television series ===
| Year | Title | Role | Notes | Ref. |
|---|---|---|---|---|
| 2024 | Flex X Cop | himself | Cameo (episode 1) | |

=== Television shows ===
| Year | Title | Role | Notes | Ref. |
|---|---|---|---|---|
| 2010 | VJ Commando | | | |
| 2013 | Veranda Show | | The World of Army Food | |
| 2013 | Real Men | Judge | Cooking show segment | |
| 2014 | Happy Together | | Christmas Special | |
| 2014 | World opinion ATLAS | | | |
| 2014 | K Chef Battlefield S2 | | | |
| 2015–2017 | Baek Jong-won's Top 3 Chef King | Main host | | |
| 2015 | My Little Television | | | |
| 2015 | Yunyega Junggye | | | |
| 2015–2017 | Home Food Rescue | | | |
| 2015 | K Chef Battlefield S3 | | | |
| 2016 | Go Go with Mr. Paik | | | |
| 2017 | Baek Jong-won's Food Truck | Main host | | |
| 2018–2019 | Street Food Fighter | Main host | | |
| 2018–2021 | Baek Jong-won's Alley Restaurant | Main host | | |
| 2019 | Paik's Mysterious Kitchen | Main host | | |
| 2019 | High School Lunch Cook-off | Main host | | |
| 2019 | Manners of Taste | Main host | | |
| 2019–2021 | Delicious Rendezvous | Main host | | |
| 2020–present | The Paikfather | Main host | | |
| 2021 | Korean Pork Belly Rhapsody | Main host | | |
| 2021 | Baek Jong-won Class | Main host | with Sung Si-kyung | |
| 2021 | Baek Jong-won's Four Seasons | Main host | | |
| 2021 | Paik's Spirit | Main host | | |
| 2022 | The Backpacker Chef | Main host | with Dindin, Ahn Bo-hyun and Oh Dae-hwan | |
| 2023–2024 | The Genius Paik | Cast member | with Kwon Yu-ri, Lee Jang-woo, BamBam and John Park | |
| 2023–2024 | The Genius Paik 2 | Cast member | with Lee Jang-woo, Kwon Yu-ri, John Park, Lee Kyu-hyung, Hyoyeon, Fabrizio Ferrari and Eric | |
| 2024 | Chef Paik & Les Miserables | Main Host | | |
| 2025–present | Chef of Antarctica | Cast Member | with Chae Jong-hyeop, Im Soo-hyang and Suho | |

== Books ==
He has published many books, usually on cooking or restaurant management.

- 2004 There is a Restaurant Secret to Earning Money (돈 버는 식당 비법은 있다), ISBN 9788935205813
- 2009 Baek Jong-won's Secret Cooking Recipes (백종원의 식당 조리비책), ISBN 9788987931289
- 2010 Professional Restaurant Managing for Beginners (초짜도 대박나는 전문식당), ISBN 9788926390856
- 2010 A Restaurant that Always Succeeds (무조건 성공하는 작은식당), ISBN 9788926390849
- 2010 Founded Recipes by the Eat-Out Management Professional Baek Jong-Won (외식경영 전문가 백종원의 창업레시피 세트), ISBN 9788926390900
- 2013 Baek Jong-won's Meat (백종원의 육), ISBN 9788987931333
- 2014 52 Home-cooked Food Recipes Recommended by Baek Jong-won (백종원이 추천하는 집밥 메뉴 52), ISBN 9788926396674
- 2016 54 Home-cooked Food Recipes Recommended by Baek Jong-won (백종원이 추천하는 집밥 메뉴 54), ISBN 9788926396858
- 2016 Baek Jong-won's Managing Story (백종원의 장사 이야기), ISBN 9788926396902
- 2017 55 Home-cooked Food Recipes Recommended by Baek Jong-won (백종원이 추천하는 집밥 메뉴 55), ISBN 9788926366028

== Awards and nominations ==
Name of the award ceremony, year presented, category, nominee of the award, and the result of the nomination
| Award ceremony | Year | Category | Nominee / Work | Result | Ref. |
|---|---|---|---|---|---|
| Blue Dragon Series Awards | 2022 | Best Male Entertainer | Baek Jong-won's Four Seasons | Nominated | |
| The Tourism & Sciences Society of Korea | 2015 | Grand Prize | Baek Jong-won | Won | |
| tvN10 Awards | 2016 | Best Content Award, Variety | Go Go with Mr. Paik | Nominated | |
| SBS Entertainment Awards | 2016 | Special Prize | Baek Jong-won's Top 3 Chef King | Won | |

=== Listicles ===
Name of publisher, year listed, name of listicle, and placement
| Publisher | Year | Listicle | Placement | Ref. |
|---|---|---|---|---|
| Forbes | 2016 | Korea Power Celebrity 40 | 21st | |
| Forbes | 2017 | Korea Power Celebrity 40 | 37th | |
| Forbes | 2018 | Korea Power Celebrity 40 | 38th | |
| Forbes | 2019 | Korea Power Celebrity 40 | 36th | |
| Forbes | 2020 | Korea Power Celebrity 40 | 16th | |
| Forbes | 2021 | Korea Power Celebrity 40 | 18th | |
