= Saemaeul =

Saemaul, Saema'eul or "new village," may refer to:

- The New Community Movement or Saemaul Undong for rural development in South Korea in the 1970s
- Saemaeul-ho, a class of passenger train operated by Korail
- Saemaeul Restaurant (also "Saemaeul Sikdang"), a Korean barbecue restaurant chain
