= The Genius Paik =

South Korean television show

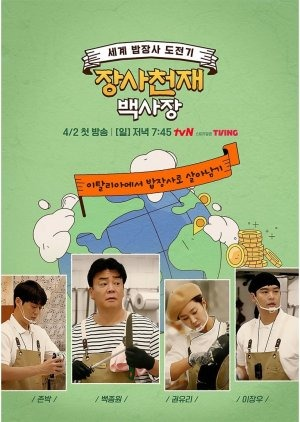
- Season 1 Promotional Poster
- Hangul: 천재 백
- Lit.: Genius Paik
- RR: Cheonjae Baek
- MR: Ch'ŏnjae Paek
- Genre: Cooking; Travel
- Starring: Main: Baek Jong-won; Lee Jang-woo; Kwon Yu-ri; John Park; Season 1: BamBam; Season 2: Lee Kyu-hyung; Hyoyeon; Fabrizio Ferrari; Eric; Season 3: Yoon Shi-yoon
- Country of origin: South Korea
- Original language: Korean
- No. of seasons: 3
- No. of episodes: 13 (Season 1); 14 (Season 2); TBA (Season 3)

Production
- Executive producer: Park Hee-yeon
- Producers: Lee Woo-hyung; Shin Chan-yang

Original release
- Network: tvN; TVING
- Release: April 2, 2023 – present

The Business Genius Chef Paik (Korean: 천재 백; lit. 'Genius Paik'), is a South Korean variety program that airs on tvN.

== Overview ==
The first season aired on Sunday at 19:45 (KST) from April 2 till June 25, 2023, for 13 episodes. It starred Baek Jong-won, Lee Jang-woo, Kwon Yu-ri, John Park and Eric. The Filming for Season 1 took place at Marrakesh, Morocco of North Africa for the first 4 episodes and Naples, Campania of Italy for the remaining 9 episodes.

The second season aired on Sunday at 19:40 KST from October 29, 2023, till February 4, 2024, for 14 episodes. It features the return of Baek Jong-won, Lee Jang-woo, Kwon Yu-ri and John Park, who were joined by the new cast members Lee Kyu-hyung, Hyoyeon, Fabrizio Ferrari and Eric. The Filming for Season 2 took place at San Sebastián, Gipuzkoa of Spain.

The third season was titled The Global Food Business Challenge Chef Paik (Korean: 세계 밥장사 도전기 백사장3). It premiered on February 10, 2026 every Tuesday at 22:10 KST, with actor Yoon Shi-yoon joining the cast with filming location as Lyon, France.

== Locations ==
=== Season 1 ===
==== North Africa ====
- Marrakesh, Morocco

==== Italy ====
- Naples, Campania

=== Season 2 ===
==== Spain ====
- San Sebastián, Gipuzkoa

=== Season 3 ===
France

- Lyon

== Cast ==
=== Main ===
- Baek Jong-won (Season 1–2)
- Lee Jang-woo (Season 1–2)
- Kwon Yu-ri (Season 1–2)
- John Park (Season 1–2)

=== Season 1 ===
- BamBam (Season 1)

=== Season 2 ===
- Lee Kyu-hyung (Season 2)
- Hyoyeon (Season 2)
- Fabrizio Ferrari (Season 2)
- Eric (Season 2)

=== Season 3 ===
- Yoon Shi-yoon (Season 3)

== Airtime ==
Season	Air date	Airtime
1	April 2 - June 25, 2023	Sundays at 19:45 (KST)
2	October 29, 2023 - February 4, 2024	Sundays at 19:40 (KST)

== Episodes ==
=== Season 1 ===
Ep.	Original broadcast date	Location
1	April 2, 2023	Marrakesh, Morocco of North Africa
2	April 9, 2023	Marrakesh, Morocco of North Africa
3	April 16, 2023	Marrakesh, Morocco of North Africa
4	April 23, 2023	Marrakesh, Morocco of North Africa
5	April 30, 2023	Naples, Campania of Italy
6	May 7, 2023	Naples, Campania of Italy
7	May 14, 2023	Naples, Campania of Italy
8	May 21, 2023	Naples, Campania of Italy
9	May 28, 2023	Naples, Campania of Italy
10	June 4, 2023	Naples, Campania of Italy
11	June 11, 2023	Naples, Campania of Italy
12	June 18, 2023	Naples, Campania of Italy
13	June 25, 2023	Naples, Campania of Italy

=== Season 2 ===
Ep.	Original broadcast date	Location
1	October 29, 2023	San Sebastián, Gipuzkoa of Spain
2	November 5, 2023	San Sebastián, Gipuzkoa of Spain
3	November 12 2023	San Sebastián, Gipuzkoa of Spain
4	November 19, 2023	San Sebastián, Gipuzkoa of Spain
5	November 26, 2023	San Sebastián, Gipuzkoa of Spain
6	December 3, 2023	San Sebastián, Gipuzkoa of Spain
7	December 10, 2023	San Sebastián, Gipuzkoa of Spain
8	December 17, 2023	San Sebastián, Gipuzkoa of Spain
9	December 31, 2023	San Sebastián, Gipuzkoa of Spain
10	January 7, 2024	San Sebastián, Gipuzkoa of Spain
11	January 14, 2024	San Sebastián, Gipuzkoa of Spain
12	January 21, 2024	San Sebastián, Gipuzkoa of Spain
13	January 28, 2024	San Sebastián, Gipuzkoa of Spain
14	February 4, 2024	San Sebastián, Gipuzkoa of Spain
