= Street Food Fighter =

Korean television program

- Promotional poster of S2
- Hangul: 스트리트 푸드 파이터
- RR: Seuteuriteu pudeu paiteo
- MR: Sŭt'ŭrit'ŭ p'udŭ p'ait'ŏ
- Genre: Variety show; Reality show; Food
- Starring: Baek Jong-won
- Country of origin: South Korea
- Original language: Korean
- No. of seasons: 2
- No. of episodes: 18

Original release
- Network: tvN
- Release: 23 April 2018 – 24 November 2019

Street Food Fighter (Korean: 스트리트 푸드 파이터) is a South Korean food travel reality show broadcast on tvN.

The show follows chef host Baek Jong-won introducing and trying local street foods around the world.

Season 1 was aired on Mondays on tvN at 11 p.m. (KST) from 23 April 2018 to 11 June 2018.

Season 2 was aired on Sundays on tvN at 10.40 p.m. (KST) from 22 September 2019 to 24 November 2019.

== Episodes and ratings ==
In the ratings below, the highest rating for the show will be in red, and the lowest rating for the show will be in blue each year.

=== Season 1 ===
Ep. #	Broadcast date	Location	Average audience share		
Ep. #	Broadcast date	Location	AGB Nielsen		TNmS Ratings
Ep. #	Broadcast date	Location	Nationwide	Seoul Capital Area	Nationwide
1	23 April 2018	Chengdu, China	1.662%	1.315%	1.9%
2	30 April 2018	Hong Kong	1.579%	1.716%	2.0%
3	7 May 2018	Bangkok, Thailand	1.740%	1.805%	2.0%
4	14 May 2018	Tokyo, Japan	1.471%	1.368%	2.3%
5	21 May 2018	Hawaii, United States	1.533%	1.974%	1.8%
6	28 May 2018	Chiang Mai, Thailand	1.348%	1.690%	1.6%
7	4 June 2018	Fukuoka, Japan	1.726%	2.058%	2.1%
8	11 June 2018	Harbin, China	2.168%	2.880%	%

=== Season 2 ===
Ep. #	Broadcast date	Location	Average audience share	
Ep. #	Broadcast date	Location	AGB Nielsen	
Ep. #	Broadcast date	Location	Nationwide	Seoul Capital Area
1	22 September 2019	Istanbul, Turkey	2.901%	3.197%
2	29 September 2019	Hanoi, Vietnam	2.527%	3.046%
3	6 October 2019	New York City, United States	2.247%	2.665%
4	13 October 2019	Xi'an, China	1.862%	1.944%
5	20 October 2019	Mexico City, Mexico	1.516%	
6	27 October 2019	Taipei, Taiwan	2.099%	2.288%
7	3 November 2019	Sicily, Italy	1.644%	1.571%
8	10 November 2019	Wuhan, China	1.931%	2.072%
9	17 November 2019	Penang, Malaysia	1.890%	1.932%
10	24 November 2019	Yanbian, China	1.986%	1.814%

- Note that the show airs on a cable channel (pay TV), which plays part in its slower uptake and relatively small audience share when compared to programs broadcast (FTA) on public networks such as KBS, SBS, MBC or EBS.
- NR rating means "not reported".
- TNmS have stopped publishing their rating report from June 2018.
