= Ahn Bo-hyun =

South Korean actor (born 1988)

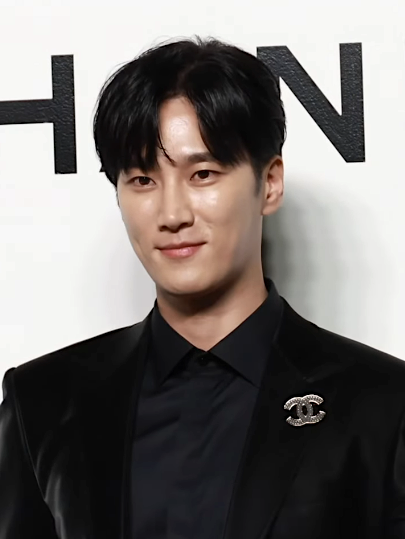
- Ahn in September 2023
- Born: May 16, 1988 (age 38); Busan, South Korea
- Education: Daekyeung University
- Occupations: Actor; model
- Years active: 2007–present
- Agent: AM

Korean name
- Hangul: 안보현
- Hanja: 安普賢
- RR: An Bohyeon
- MR: An Pohyŏn

Ahn Bo-hyun (Korean: 안보현; born May 16, 1988) is a South Korean actor, model, and television personality. Since his acting debut in 2014, he has appeared in various films and television dramas. Ahn achieved a career breakthrough with Itaewon Class (2020). He won the Excellence Award, Actor in an OTT Drama for his roles in Yumi's Cells and My Name at the 8th APAN Star Awards on September 29, 2022.

== Early life and career ==
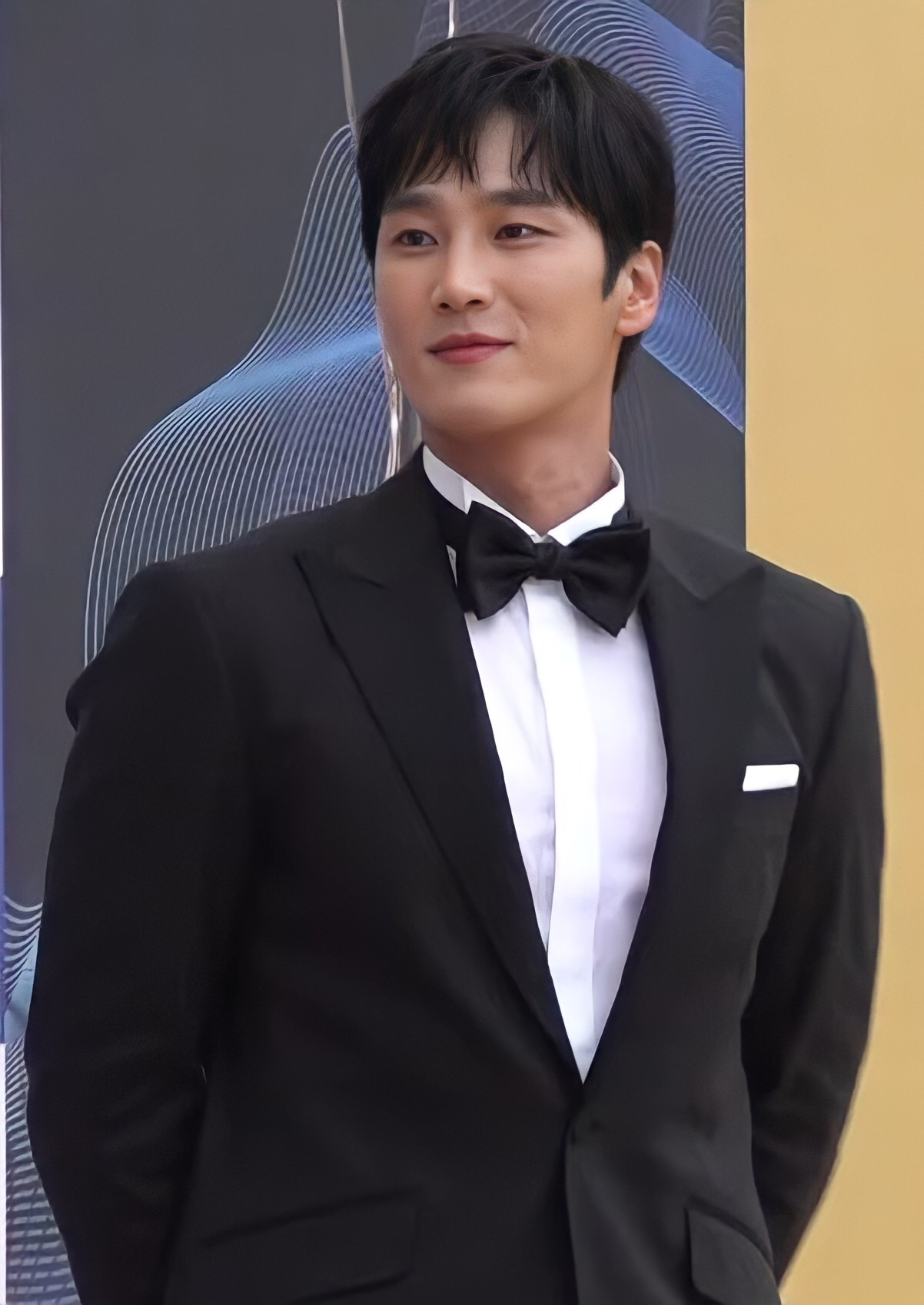
Ahn at Blue Dragon Series Awards in July 2022

Ahn was born in Busan, South Korea, on May 16, 1988. As a graduate from Busan Sports High School, he participated in amateur boxing competitions and previously won a gold medal. He originally debuted as a model in 2007. Since his acting debut in 2014, he has appeared in various films and television dramas including Descendants of the Sun (2016), Dokgo Rewind (2018), and Her Private Life (2019).

Ahn achieved success and achieved a breakthrough through the drama Itaewon Class (2020), where he portrayed the villain Jang Geun-won. He furthered his success with leading roles in Netflix series My Name (2021), tvN dramas Yumi's Cells (2021–2022), Military Prosecutor Doberman (2022), See You in My 19th Life (2023), and Flex X Cop (2024).

Ahn starred in the TvN romantic-comedy series Spring Fever opposite Lee Joo-bin in 2026. It is based on the web novel of the same name by Baek Min-a, about a woman who leaves Seoul after a heartbreak and meets a man who changes her life. Ahn played the protagonist Seon Jae-gyu, the CEO of JQ Power Energy.

== Personal life ==
On August 3, 2023, FN Entertainment confirmed that Ahn was dating Jisoo from Blackpink. However, just two months after going public with their relationship, it was confirmed that the two had broken up due to their busy schedules.

== Other ventures ==
=== Philanthropy ===
On May 28, 2022, Ahn donated 528 boxes of sanitary napkins to the underprivileged on the occasion of World Menstruation Day, by donating through the G-Foundation Foundation.

=== Ambassadorship ===
On November 12, 2021, following his role as a police detective in My Name, Ahn was named as an honorary marine police officer by the Namhae Coast Guard.

== Filmography ==
=== Film ===
Year	Title	Role	Notes	Ref.
2016	Hiya	Lee Jin-sang		
2019	Memories of a Dead End	Tae-gyu		
2023	Noryang: Deadly Sea	Yi Hoe		
2024	I, the Executioner	Min Kang-hoon	Cameo	
2025	Pretty Crazy	Gil-goo		

=== Television series ===
Year	Title	Role	Notes	Ref.
2014	Golden Cross			
2014	Two Mothers			
2014	My Secret Hotel	Sang-hoon		
2015	The Dearest Lady	Lee Bong-gil		
2016	Descendants of the Sun	Im Kwang-nam		
2016	After the Show Ends	Cha Kang-woo		
2016	My Runway	Wang Rin		
2017	Wednesday 3:30 PM	Baek Seung-kyu		
2017	Sisters-in-Law	James Seo / Seo Jun-young	Cameo	
2017	Girls' Generation 1979	Young Choon's old friend		
2018	Hide and Seek	Baek Do-hoon		
2019	Her Private Life	Nam Eun-ki		
2019	Investiture of the Gods	Bi De [Yin Jiao's aide]	Chinese drama	
2019	Drama Stage – "Crumbling Friendship"	Yoo Seung-bong	Season 2	
2020	Itaewon Class	Jang Geun-won		
2020	Kairos	Seo Do-kyun		
2021–2022	Yumi's Cells	Goo Woong	Season 1–2	
2021	My Name	Jeon Pil-do		
2022	Military Prosecutor Doberman	Do Bae-man		
2022	Adamas	Kwon Min-jo	Cameo (episode 4)	
2023	See You in My 19th Life	Moon Seo-ha		
2024	Flex X Cop	Jin Yi-soo		
2026	Spring Fever	Seon Jae-gyu		
2026	Flex X Cop 2	Jin Yi-soo		
2027	God's Beads	Baek Gyeol		

=== Web series ===
Year	Title	Role	Notes	Ref.
2017	My Only Love Song	Moo-myung		
2018	Dokgo Rewind	Pyo Tae-jin		
2022	A Place You Can Come Back Anytime		Japanese drama	

=== Television shows ===
Year	Title	Role	Notes	Ref.
2022	The Backpacker Chef	Host	with Baek Jong-won, DinDin and Oh Dae-hwan	
2023	You Go to Sydney	Cast Member	with Heo Sung-tae, Lee Si-eon and Kwaktube	
2024	The Backpacker Chef Season 2	Host	with Baek Jong-won, Lee Soo-geun, Heo Kyung-hwan, and Ko Kyung-pyo	

=== Web shows ===
Year	Title	Role	Ref.
2022	Young Actors' Retreat	Cast member	

=== Hosting ===
Year	Title	Notes	Ref.
2020	2020 MBC Entertainment Awards	with Jun Hyun-moo and Jang Do-yeon	

== Awards and nominations ==
Award ceremony	Year	Category	Nominee / Work	Result	Ref.
APAN Star Awards	2021	Best New Actor	Itaewon Class	Nominated	
APAN Star Awards	2022	Excellence Award, Actor in an OTT Drama	My Name; Yumi's Cells	Won	
Asia Artist Awards	2020	Popularity Award (Actor)	Ahn Bo-hyun	Nominated	
Asia Artist Awards	2020	Best Emotive Award (Actor)	Ahn Bo-hyun	Won	
Asia Artist Awards	2020	Choice Award	Ahn Bo-hyun	Won	
Asia Model Festival	2023	Model Star Award	Ahn Bo-hyun	Won	
Baeksang Arts Awards	2020	Best New Actor – Television	Itaewon Class	Nominated	
Blue Dragon Film Awards	2025	Best New Actor	Pretty Crazy	Won	
Blue Dragon Series Awards	2022	Best Supporting Actor	My Name	Nominated	
Brand of the Year Awards	2020	Rising Star Actor of the Year	Itaewon Class	Won	
Korea First Brand Awards	2020	Rising Star Actor	Itaewon Class	Won	
MBC Drama Awards	2020	Excellence Award, Actor in a Monday-Tuesday Miniseries	Kairos	Nominated	
MBC Drama Awards	2020	Best New Actor	Kairos	Won	
MBC Entertainment Awards	2020	Rookie Award in Variety Category – Male	I Live Alone	Nominated	

=== Listicles ===
Name of publisher, year listed, name of listicle, and placement
Publisher	Year	Listicle	Placement	Ref.
Cine21	2021	Actors that will lead Korean Video Content Industry in 2022	6th (Note: mentioned together with Wi Ha-joon, Kim Soo-hyun, Jo Jung-suk, Park Jeong-min, Song Kang-ho, Ma Dong-seok, Kim Seon-ho, Ryu Jun-yeol, Choi Woo-shik)	
Elle Japan	2022	Top 16 Hallyu Best Actor	4th	
