= Chef of Antarctica =

South Korean television show

- Promotional poster
- Hangul: 남극의 쉐프
- Lit.: Antarctica Chef
- RR: Namgeugui swepeu
- MR: Namgŭgŭi swep'ŭ
- Genre: Cooking; Travel
- Starring: Baek Jong-won; Chae Jong-hyeop; Im Soo-hyang; Suho
- Country of origin: South Korea
- Original language: Korean
- No. of seasons: 1
- No. of episodes: 7

Production
- Producer: Hwang Soon-kyu
- Production companies: MBC; Studio X+U

Original release
- Network: MBC TV
- Release: November 17 – December 22, 2025

Chef of Antarctica (Korean: 남극의 쉐프; lit. 'Antarctica Chef') is a South Korean variety program that airs on MBC from November 17, 2025 till December 22, 2025. at 22:50 (KST). It stars Baek Jong-won, Chae Jong-hyeop, Im Soo-hyang and Suho.

The show follows Baek Jong-won and his team on their trip to Antarctica to cook food for the South Korean crew stationed at King Sejong Station with limited electricity and food supplies, which are only restocked once a year. Each episode is split into two parts with the exception of the final episode.

It is Baek Jong-won's first variety show program comeback in 6 months since his hiatus from broadcasting activities due to a series of controversies with his company, The Born Korea.

== Overview ==
PD Hwang Soon-kyu revealed in an interview that the show had finished filming in November 2024 and was supposed to be broadcast in April 2025, but the original airing date for the broadcast was postponed and moved to May 2025. However, it was postponed again and later moved to November 2025 due to the presidential election, external circumstances, and the controversy surrounding Baek Jong-won and his company, which the production staff of the show stated that they already aware of the situation and took the matter seriously and had serious discussions about the program’s message and direction, with PD Hwang Soon-kyu stating that the show is not centered on its cast.

== Cast ==
=== Main ===
- Baek Jong-won
- Chae Jong-hyeop
- Im Soo-hyang
- Suho

=== Cameo Appearances ===
- Cho Kyu-hyun (Super Junior) - Episode 1

== Airtime ==
Season	Air date	Airtime
1	November 17, 2025 - December 22, 2025	Mondays at 22:50 (KST)

== Episodes ==
=== Season 1 ===
Ep.	Original broadcast date	Episode name	Locations	Foods
1 (Note: Brief Appearance by Cho Kyu-hyun (Super Junior))	November 17, 2025	A Doubtful Beginning (이래도 되나 싶은 시작)	Chile (Santiago & Punta Arenas, Magallanes and the Chilean Antarctica) Antarctica (King Sejong Station, King George Island)	Episode 1: Chicken Porridge Episode 2: Main Dishes: Chicken Nanban w/ Yellow Tartar Sauce, Stir-fried ketchup Sausages w/ Green Bell Peppers and Fusilli, Seasoned Rapeseed greens & Side dishes. Boxed Meals: Rice Balls, Buffalo Wings, Croquettes, Fried sausages and lettuces.
2	November 24, 2025	Cold or Possibly Staled (차갑거나 혹은 변했거나)	Chile (Santiago & Punta Arenas, Magallanes and the Chilean Antarctica) Antarctica (King Sejong Station, King George Island)	Episode 1: Chicken Porridge Episode 2: Main Dishes: Chicken Nanban w/ Yellow Tartar Sauce, Stir-fried ketchup Sausages w/ Green Bell Peppers and Fusilli, Seasoned Rapeseed greens & Side dishes. Boxed Meals: Rice Balls, Buffalo Wings, Croquettes, Fried sausages and lettuces.
3	December 1, 2025	Penguin Village in Antarctica City (남극특별시 펭귄마을)	King Sejong Station, King George Island Penguin Island, Narębski Point Argentina Carlini Base, Potter Cove Great Wall Station, Fildes Peninsula.	Episode 3: Boxed Meals: Mallow Beef Doejang Porridge & Dried Radish Greens Episode 4: Main Dishes: Korean grilled bulgogi & Dalgona.
4	December 1, 2025	Temperature of Flavors (맛의 온도)	King Sejong Station, King George Island Penguin Island, Narębski Point Argentina Carlini Base, Potter Cove Great Wall Station, Fildes Peninsula.	Episode 3: Boxed Meals: Mallow Beef Doejang Porridge & Dried Radish Greens Episode 4: Main Dishes: Korean grilled bulgogi & Dalgona.
5	December 8, 2025	An Antarctica-like Day (남극스러운 하루)	Great Wall Station, Fildes Peninsula King Sejong Station, King George Island (flashback only) Uruguayan Artigas Base, King George Island, South Shetland Islands Punta Arenas, Magallanes and the Chilean Antarctica (flashback only) King Sejong Station, King George Island.	Episode 5: Main Dishes: Andong jjimdak, Stir-fried webfoot octopus, Jjimdak, Doenjang Stew, Pork belly & octopus bulgogi, Rolled omelet. Episode 6: Main Dishes: Kimbap (Beef, Tonkatsu (Pork cutlet), Tuna w/ Tuna mixed-in sauce, Crab meat & Spring cabbage), Dried Pollack soup, Candied Sweet Pumpkin. Birthday foods: Braised Ribs, Rose Tteokbokki, Jjolmyeon, Bungeoppang. Night Shift Food: Anchovy Noodle Soup
6	December 15, 2025	Mango and Pickled Radish (망고와 단무지)	Great Wall Station, Fildes Peninsula King Sejong Station, King George Island (flashback only) Uruguayan Artigas Base, King George Island, South Shetland Islands Punta Arenas, Magallanes and the Chilean Antarctica (flashback only) King Sejong Station, King George Island.	Episode 5: Main Dishes: Andong jjimdak, Stir-fried webfoot octopus, Jjimdak, Doenjang Stew, Pork belly & octopus bulgogi, Rolled omelet. Episode 6: Main Dishes: Kimbap (Beef, Tonkatsu (Pork cutlet), Tuna w/ Tuna mixed-in sauce, Crab meat & Spring cabbage), Dried Pollack soup, Candied Sweet Pumpkin. Birthday foods: Braised Ribs, Rose Tteokbokki, Jjolmyeon, Bungeoppang. Night Shift Food: Anchovy Noodle Soup
7	December 22, 2025	Becoming Family (식구가 거 된다는 것)	King Sejong Station, King George Island Flashbacks: Great Wall Station, Fildes Peninsula; Argentina Carlini Base, Potter Cove; Uruguayan Artigas Base, South Shetland Islands	Main Dishes: Bibimbap & Makgeolli (drink)

== Controversies ==
Following its broadcast, the show was criticized by viewers for not bringing any food supplies from Korea, instead relying entirely on the station's existing annual stock, which was already low when the crew arrived in November. According to production statements, the pantry visited in November was "nearly empty," and the additional cast and crew consumed food intended for the base's limited winter population, raising concerns that the filming may have worsened a pre-existing food shortage. During filming, the team of roughly 30 cast and production members ate from the same stores as the research staff, effectively increasing the number of people consuming the limited supplies at a time when deliveries are made once a year. In addition, a viewer filed a complaint with the Korea Communications Standards Commission, alleging that a dish shown on the program closely resembled a menu item associated with Baek Jong-won's restaurant brand, raising concerns over indirect advertising on public broadcast content.
