= Kim Sung-joo (presenter) =

South Korean television presenter (born 1972)

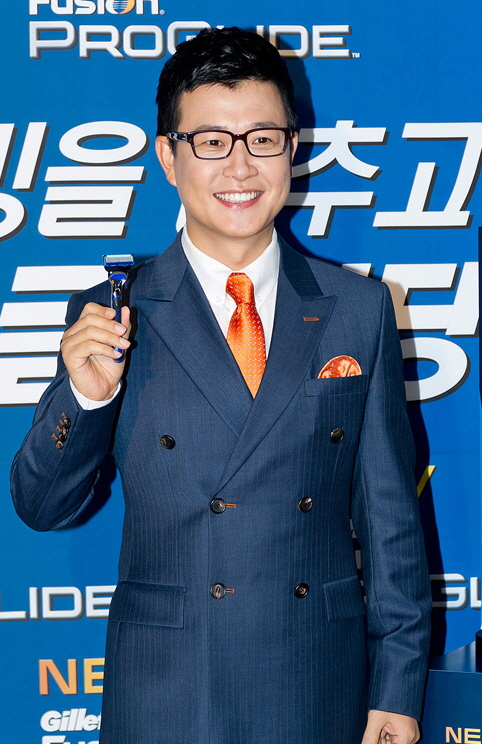
- Kim in September 2011
- Born: October 10, 1972 (age 53); Cheongju, South Korea
- Education: Chung Ang University – Graduate School of Journalism and Broadcasting (Master)
- Spouse: Jin Soo-jung (m. 2002)
- Children: 3

Korean name
- Hangul: 김성주
- RR: Gim Seongju
- MR: Kim Sŏngju

Kim Sung-joo (born October 10, 1972) is a South Korean television host and a former announcer. A former sports broadcaster and presenter, he became known to the wider public as a variety show host and for his stint on the reality-variety show Dad! Where Are We Going?.

== Early life ==
Born and raised in North Chungcheong Province, Kim is the son of a Presbyterian minister. He attended high school in Cheongju and moved to Seoul, where he graduated from Chung-Ang University.

== Career ==
Kim started his broadcasting career in 1995 as a public service announcement reader with the government channel KTV. He went into sports broadcasting, joining Korea TV Sports (now SBS Sports) and then Munhwa Broadcasting Corporation (MBC). While with MBC he became popular as a current affairs presenter and notably covered the 2002 and 2006 FIFA World Cups. In 2007 he left MBC to be a freelancer after seven years with the station.

As a freelancer, Kim has hosted various popular variety shows ranging from singing competitions Mnet's Superstar K and MBC's King of Mask Singer to the cooking show Please Take Care of My Refrigerator. He has also returned to the sports broadcasting scene as a guest broadcaster for the 2014 Winter Olympics and 2016 Summer Olympics. In 2012 he notably returned to MBC to cover the London Olympics at the last minute due to the absence of experienced reporters from the ongoing reporters' union strikes, which earned him both praise and condemnation from viewers and fellow broadcasters alike.

On November 15, 2021, Kim founded the Matched Project (MCP) agency with Kim Young-man, Ahn Jung-hwan, and Jung Hyung-don.

In October 2024, he became an exclusive sports caster for MBC.

== Personal life ==
Kim married his university sweetheart in 2002 after a nine-year courtship. The couple have three children, sons Min-guk and Min-yul and daughter Min-joo. Min-guk and Min-yul were cast members on Dad! Where Are We Going? with their father.

== Filmography ==
=== Films ===
Year	Title	Role	Notes
2009	Take Off	Broadcaster	
2011	Marrying the Mafia IV	Announcer	
2013	Mr. Go	Narration	

=== Television shows ===
Year	Title	Notes
2009–2016	Superstar K	Host, Seasons 2–8
2010	2010 Idol Star Athletics Championships	Host
2012	Live Talk Show Taxi	Special MC
2012	Star Couple Show	120202, 120315
2013	Healing Camp, Aren't You Happy	131118, 131125 Ep 117–118
2013–2014	Dad! Where Are We Going? Season 1	With his eldest son, Gim Min-guk
2014	Radio Star	140101, 140514
2014	Infinite Challenge	Ep 365, 384–385
2014	SNS Angel	140926
2014–2015	Dad! Where Are We Going? Season 2	With his youngest son, Gim Min-yul
2014–2018	The List (명단공개)	Host
2014–2019	Please Take Care of My Refrigerator	Host
2015	Car!Center	Host
2015	Happy Together (Season 3)	150312 Ep 389
2015	Healing Camp	150413, 150420 Ep 179–180
2015	Show Me the Receipt Please	Host
2015–2016	만나면 흥하리! 모란봉클럽	Host
2015–present	King of Mask Singer	Host
2016	WE KID	Host
2016	나를 찾아줘	Host
2016	Infinite Challenge	160109 Ep 462
2016–2018	Carefree Travellers	Cast
2017	Baek Jong-won's Food Truck	Host
2017–2021	Baek Jong-won's Alley Restaurant	Host
2019	Paik's Mysterious Kitchen	Host
2019	Miss Trot	Host
2019–present	Broadcasting on Your Side	Host
2019–2020	Joy of the Struggle	Cast
2019–2020	Rewind	Host
2020	Mr Trot	Host
2020–2021	Romantic Call Centre	Host
2021	Steel Troops	Fixed moderator
2021	Tomorrow National Singer	Host
2021	Chicken Wars	Host
2021	Sound of the Rising Moon	Host
2021	The Masked Talent	Host / MBC Chuseok's special
2021–2022	Winner(s)	Host
2021	My Name is Caddy	Main Cast
2022	Operation Time	Host
2022	legendfestival	Host
2022	Steel Troops	Panelist; Season 2
2022	House Big Battle	Host
2022	Anafrey Sea	Host with Lee Eun-ji
2022	Ah! I'm Free Sea	Cast
2022	Hole-in-One	Host with Soyou
2022	Neighborhood Billiards	Host
2022	Men of the Wind	Host with Park Chang-geun
2022	Steel Ball	Host; Steel Troops spin-off
2022	Mr Trot (Season 2)	Host
2022	Ahn Jung-hwan's Hidden Qatar	Regular Member
2023	Rural Police Returns (Season 1–2)	Cast Member

=== Hosting ===
Year	Title	Notes	Ref.
2019	2019 MBC Drama Awards	with Han Hye-jin	
2019	2019 SBS Entertainment Awards	with Park Na-rae and Jo Jung-shik	
2020	2020 MBC Drama Awards		
2021	2021 MBC Drama Awards		
2021	2021 KBS Entertainment Awards	with Han Sun-hwa and Moon Se-yoon	
2022	31st Seoul Music Awards	with Kim Seol-hyun and Boom	
2022	2022 MBC Drama Awards	with Choi Soo-young	
2023	2023 MBC Drama Awards	with Park Gyu-young	
2024	2024 MBC Drama Awards	with Chae Soo-bin	
2025	2025 MBC Drama Awards	with Lee Sun-bin	

=== Web shows ===
Year	Title	Role	Ref.
2021	Blue Chip Stars	Host	

== Awards and nominations ==
Year presented, name of the award ceremony, category, nominated work, and the result of the nomination
Year	Award	Category	Nominated work	Result
2004	MBC Drama Awards	Special Award in TV MC		Won
2005	MBC Drama Awards	Excellence Award in Radio		Won
2006	MBC Entertainment Awards	Popularity Award		Won
2013	MBC Entertainment Awards	PD Award		Won
2015	51st Baeksang Arts Awards	Best Male Variety Performer – Male	Please Take Care of My Refrigerator, King of Mask Singer	Nominated
2016	52nd Baeksang Arts Awards	Best Male Variety Performer – Male	King of Mask Singer	Nominated
2017	17th MBC Entertainment Awards	PD Award	King of Mask Singer	Won
2018	12th SBS Entertainment Awards	Best MC Award	Baek Jong-won's Alley Restaurant	Won
2019	13th SBS Entertainment Awards	Top Excellence Award in Show/Variety Category	Baek Jong-won's Alley Restaurant	Won
2019	19th MBC Entertainment Awards	Grand Prize (Daesang)		Nominated
2019	19th MBC Entertainment Awards	Best Couple Award with Ahn Jung-hwan	Broadcasting on Your Side	Nominated
2019	19th MBC Entertainment Awards	Entertainer of the Year		Won
2020	56th Baeksang Arts Awards	Best Male Variety Performer – Male	Mr Trot	Nominated
2020	14th SBS Entertainment Awards	Special Awards: Public Interest Variety Award	Baek Jong-won's Alley Restaurant	Won
2020	2020 MBC Entertainment Awards	Grand Prize (Daesang)		Nominated
2022	2022 MBC Entertainment Awards	Entertainer of the Year Award	Kim Sung-joo	Won
