= The Backpacker Chef =

South Korean television show

- Promotional poster
- Hangul: 백패커
- Lit.: Backpacker
- RR: Baekpaekeo
- MR: Paekp'aek'ŏ
- Genre: Cooking; Travel
- Starring: Current: Baek Jong-won; Ahn Bo-hyun; Go Kyung-pyo; Heo Kyung-hwan; Lee Soo-geun; Former: DinDin; Oh Dae-hwan
- Country of origin: South Korea
- Original language: Korean
- No. of seasons: 2
- No. of episodes: 44

Production
- Executive producer: Park Hee-yeon
- Producers: Lee Woo-hyung; Shin Chan-yang

Original release
- Network: tvN
- Release: May 26, 2022 – November 10, 2024

The Backpacker Chef (Korean: 백패커; lit. 'Backpacker') is a South Korean variety program that airs on tvN.

Season 1 aired on Thursdays at 20:40 (KST) from May 26 till October 6, 2022, for 20 episodes. It starred Baek Jong-won, Oh Dae-hwan, Ahn Bo-hyun and DinDin.

Season 2 aired on Sundays at 19:40 (KST) from May 26 to November 10, 2024. For this season, Baek Jong-won and Ahn Bo-hyun returned, together with new cast members Lee Soo-geun, Heo Kyung-hwan and Go Kyung-pyo.

== Overview ==
The Backpacker Chef is a cooking entertainment program that challenges the extreme mission of improvising a customized food within a limited time in an unfamiliar place to the customer. Cast members leave with only one backpack containing a variety of kitchen tools and ingredients, and present instant catering for unfamiliar guests at the venue of the day.

In the first season, Backpacker Chefs went on 18 different business trips and cooked for 3078 people, preparing more than 100 different dishes.

== Cast ==
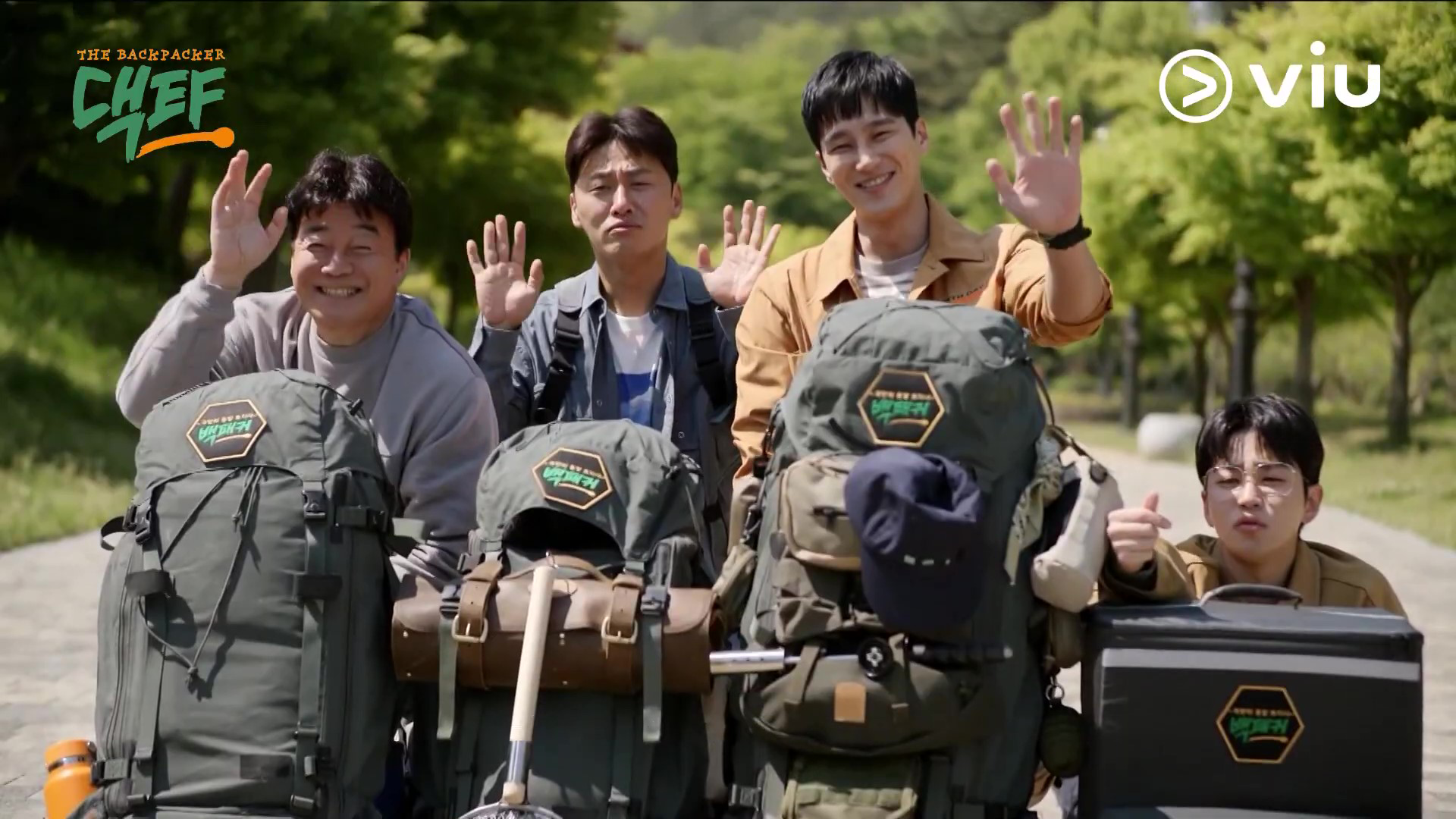
Cast members of Season 1 (From left to right: Baek Jong-won, Oh Dae-hwan, Ahn Bo-hyun, and DinDin)

=== Main ===
==== Current ====
- Baek Jong-won (Seasons 1-2)
- Ahn Bo-hyun (Seasons 1-2)
- Lee Soo-geun (Season 2)
- Heo Kyung-hwan (Season 2)
- Go Kyung-pyo (Season 2)

==== Former ====
- Oh Dae-hwan (Season 1)
- DinDin (Season 1)

=== Guest cast ===
==== Season 1 ====
- Kim Dong-jun (ZE:A) - Episode 5
- Young K (Day6) - Episode 8 & 9
- Andy (Shinhwa) - Episode 12
- Lee Ho-cheol - Episode 13
- Yang Se-hyung - Episode 18
- Heo Kyung-hwan - Episode 19
- Fabrizio Ferrari - Episode 8, 9, 14, 17, 19

==== Season 2 ====
- Lee Do-hyun - Episode 2
- Fabrizio Ferrari - Episode 3, 21
- Miyeon ((G)I-dle) - Episode 3
- DinDin - Episode 4, 5, 18
- Bomi (Apink) - Episode 7
- Kang Han-na - Episode 8
- Hyojung (Oh My Girl) - Episode 9
- Seohyun (Girls' Generation) - Episode 11
- Yuri (Girls' Generation) - Episode 12
- Cho Kyu-hyun (Super Junior) - Episode 13
- Soyou (Former member of Sistar) - Episode 17
- Jang Ye-won - Episode 18
- Kwon Eun-bi - Episode 19
- Seok Matthew (Zerobaseone) - Episode 21
- Kim Min-jong - Episode 22

== Airtime ==
Season	Air date	Airtime
1	May 26 – October 6, 2022	Thursdays at 20:40 (KST)
2	May 26 – November 10, 2024	Sundays at 19:40 (KST)

== Episodes ==
=== Season 1 ===
Ep.	Original broadcast date	Location	Mission	Guest appearance	Ref.
1	May 26, 2022	Jeongeup, North Jeolla Province	Unlimited fast food to a wrestling club made up of 22 elementary, middle, and high school students	No guest	
2	June 2, 2022	Byeonsan, North Jeolla Province	A vegetarian meal to 20–30 people who visit Wolmyeon-am	No guest	
3	June 9, 2022	Meteorology 1 (Note: The first meteorological observation ship of South Korea.) in the middle of Yellow Sea	Multinational party dishes for 17 employees of the meteorological ship of Korea Meteorological Administration	No guest	
4	June 16, 2022	Pocheon, Gyeonggi Province	A dinner for 300 people of artillery brigade at the Pocheon military base 10 lunchboxes for soldiers training the mountains	No guest	
5	June 23, 2022	Paju, Gyeonggi Province	A dinner for 400 members of the 1st Infantry Division, Ilwolseong Battalion	Kim Dong-jun (ZE:A)	
6	June 30, 2022	Jeju Island	Pork course dishes for a group made up of 15 of haenyeo	No guest	
7	July 7, 2022	Jeju Island	50 servings of healthy course meals for the Jeju United FC football team	No guest	
8	July 14, 2022	Camp Humphreys	Korean snacks for 15 drill instructors of US Army and KATUSA	Young K (Day6) & Fabrizio Ferrari	
9	July 21, 2022	Camp Humphreys	Korean food for lunch of 500 US and KATUSA soldiers	Young K (Day6) & Fabrizio Ferrari	
10	July 28, 2022	Cheonan, Chungcheongnam-do	A cool summer dinner for 250 trainees at Fire Fighters' Academy	No guest	
11	August 4, 2022	Cheonan, Chungcheongnam-do	A low-sugar, low-salt lunch for 32 children at Seobuk District Police Station day care center An afternoon snack for the same children later	No guest	
12	August 11, 2022	Seoul Grand Park	A hot meal for 120 zookeepers A summer snack for 4 elephants	Andy (Shinhwa)	
13	August 18, 2022	North Gyeongsang Province Correctional Institution	High protein, high calorie, and high fat lunch for 200 prison guards	Lee Ho-cheol	
14	August 25, 2022	Yeongdam, Busan	Cheat day meals for 150 athletic students at Busan Sports High School	Fabrizio Ferrari	
15	September 1, 2022	Jinhae Naval Base	Fusion Korean food for 120 sailors of ROKS Hansando	No guest	
16	September 8, 2022	Yecheon, North Gyeongsang Province	MZ food for 27 elderly female painters at Shinpoong-ri Painting School	No guest	
17	September 15, 2022	Ganghwado	Western, Chinese, and Japanese food for 280 students at Chef High School	Fabrizio Ferrari	
18	September 22, 2022	Goyang, Gyeonggi Province	Superfood for 150 staff members of the operation room of National Cancer Hospital	Yang Se-hyung	
19	September 29, 2022	Yuseong District, Daejeon	College food for the 330 cadets at Armed Forces Nursing Academy	Fabrizio Ferrari & Heo Kyung-hwan (Note: Heo Kyung-hwan would eventually joined the main cast later on in the season 2.)	
20	October 6, 2022	Wonju, Gangwon Province	Camping food for cast members themselves who go on a healing camping trip as a reward vacation	No guest	

=== Season 2 ===
Ep.	Original broadcast date	Location	Mission	Guest appearance	Ref.
1	May 26, 2024	Mageum-ri, Taean, South Chungcheong Province	Clam cuisine for 150 workers of a clam fishing village, and their families	No guest	
2	June 2, 2024	Republic of Korea Air Force Headquarter in Gyeryong, South Chungcheong Province	"Dinner Show, Western Food, and Cooking Performance" for 100 people	Lee Do-hyun	
3	June 9, 2024	Jincheon National Training Center (Note: Kim Min-jong who appeared as a cameo in this episode, returned as guest cast on episode 22)	"Special meal" and "Paik Jong Won Street" for 500 people	Fabrizio Ferrari & Miyeon ((G)I-dle)	
4	June 16, 2024 (Note: Go Kyung-pyo did not attend the filming due to the filming of his drama.) (Note: DinDin became temporary assistant chef in this episode.)	Gyechon Elementary School	"Music is classical" and "Taste is latest style spicy tteokbokki" for 44 people	DinDin	
5	June 23, 2024	Baegunsan, Gyeonggi Province, Gangwon Province	"Cold Food" and "Quick Delivery" for 120 soldiers at the "1000m above sea level".	DinDin	
6	June 30, 2024	Hwaseong Fire Station in Hwaseong, Gyeonggi Province	"Taste good even if you eat it later", "Easy to digest", and "Strongest nutritious food" for 110 firefighters during the Merit Reward Month.	No guest	
7	July 7, 2024	Incheon International Airport	"Feeling good, Tasty and Resort food" from famous holiday place (Hawaii, Ganmun-ri, Jeollanam-do, Bali, Da Nang, Maldives, Okinawa, Hainan, and Boracay) for 300 Airport Workers during the busiest Holiday month.	Bomi	
8	July 14, 2024	National Institute of Ecology (NIE)	"Cities" and "Summer seasonal food" for 200 NIE Staff.	Kang Han-na	
9	July 21, 2024	Incheon National Maritime High School (Note: The location was previously visited by Baek Jong-won 5 years ago on High School Lunch Cook-off.)	Turned the bad school foods with Baek Jong-won's magic into good food for 230 Students.	Hyojung (Oh My Girl)	
10	July 28, 2024	Geumsu Culture and Art Village	Cook traditional korean foods for 35 Geumsu village elders.	No guest	
11	August 11, 2024 (Note: Episode 11 originally scheduled to aired one week early and so on until episode 20, but later was postponed due to 2024 Paris Olympics.)	National Archives of Korea	Cook the lost dishes that were originally popular in the past to 310 National Archives Korea staff.	Seohyun (Girls' Generation)	
12	August 18, 2024	Metropolitan Railway Vehicle Maintenance Workshop in Gyeonggi Province, Goyang	Cook Signature dishes from places that KTX visited for 180 workers.	Yuri (Girls' Generation)	
13	August 25, 2024	Arisu Water Purification Center, Gangbuk District, South Korea	"Rainy season, typhoon, stay away", "Taste that goes through fire and water" and "Number of people for drinking water is 3.5 million" for 100 workers.	Cho Kyu-hyun (Super Junior)	
14	September 1, 2024	National Forensic Service, Gangwon Province, Wonju	"Find a flavor solution" "Endorphin explosion" and "Adrenaline detected at the location" for 140 workers.	No guest	
15	September 8, 2024	Korea Expressway Corporation, Gimcheon, North Gyeongsang Province	"An important stop on the way home", "The flavor that started it, Chestnut, Geobong Wine, Chun Hyang", for 120 employees.	No guest	
16	September 15, 2024	Midong Elementary School, Seoul,	"Tornado Kick, "Knifehand Strike" and "Hammer Smash" for 28 Students of the first children Taekwondo Demonstration team before the National Liberation Day of Korea event.	No guest	
17	September 22, 2024	National Theater of Korea	"Multiple Toppings at once" and "Harmonious Meal" For 170 National Theater Workers.	Soyou	
18	September 29, 2024 (Note: Ahn Bo-hyun did not attend the filming due to the filming of his drama.)	Korea Aerospace Industries	"Stomach Booster", "GO Capacity, GO Calories", and "High Fast Food" for 200 Workers.	Jang Ye-won & DinDin	
19	October 6, 2024	Republic of Korea 1st Special Forces Brigade Headquarter	Cook the high quality fresh foods to the unit of 200 people before going for the 1,000-Ri March.	Kwon Eun-bi	
20	October 13, 2024	Gwangju Women's University, Gwangsan District, Gwangju	Cook the $1 breakfast for 120 college students with just $120.	No guest	
21	October 20, 2024	Daegu Agricultural Meister High School, Suseong District, Daegu	"Harvest Season" and "100% self-sufficient" for 240 People.	Seok Matthew (Zerobaseone) & Fabrizio Ferrari	
22	October 27, 2024	Cheongju Post Office	"Breaking from Eating Alone Today" and "An Order for 4 or More People" for 84 Post Office Worker	Kim Min-jong (Note: Kim Min-jong once appeared as a cameo in the episode 3 of Season 2.)	
23	November 3, 2024	Gwanak Police Station, Gwanak District, Seoul	"A meal that call for rice" for 140 Police Officer	No guest	
24	November 10, 2024	Youth Meal Mungan, Sinchon-dong, Seoul	"House Cook Master Paik" and "Kimchi's Transformation is Innocent" for 100 people.	No guest	

== Viewership ==
The Backpacker Chef : South Korea viewers per episode (thousands)

Episodes	Episode number									
Episodes	1	2	3	4	5	6	7	8	9	10
1-10	803	716	809	1120	1259	1015	897	944	977	908
1-20	845	800	823	1072	1076	967	1063	918	1226	902

Source: Audience measurement performed nationwide by Nielsen Media Research.
The Backpacker Chef 2 : South Korea viewers per episode (millions)

Episodes	Episode number											
Episodes	1	2	3	4	5	6	7	8	9	10	11	12
1-12	1.278	1.145	1.296	1.087	1.198	1.138	1.342	1.686	1.787	1.365	0.908	1.146
13-24	1.225	1.391	1.395	1.068	1.323	1.396	1.584	1.490	1.510	1.414	1.330	1.524

Source: Audience measurement performed nationwide by Nielsen Media Research.

Average TV viewership ratings
Ep. (2022 & 2024)	Original broadcast date	Average audience share (Nielsen Korea)	
Ep. (2022 & 2024)	Original broadcast date	Nationwide	Seoul
1	May 26, 2022	3.853% (1st)	3.810% (1st)
2	June 2, 2022	3.196% (2nd)	2.986% (2nd)
3	June 9, 2022	3.223% (1st)	3.238% (1st)
4	June 16, 2022	4.727% (1st)	4.435% (1st)
5	June 23, 2022	5.333% (1st)	5.266% (1st)
6	June 30, 2022	4.236% (1st)	4.295% (1st)
7	July 7, 2022	3.707% (2nd)	4.146% (2nd)
8	July 14, 2022	4.171% (2nd)	4.111% (2nd)
9	July 21, 2022	4.275% (3rd)	4.331% (3rd)
10	July 28, 2022	4.056% (2nd)	3.985% (2nd)
11	August 4, 2022	3.319% (2nd)	3.564% (2nd)
12	August 11, 2022	3.275% (3rd)	3.246% (3rd)
13	August 18, 2022	3.879% (3rd)	4.146% (2nd)
14	August 25, 2022	4.636% (1st)	4.766% (1st)
15	September 1, 2022	4.839% (1st)	4.598% (1st)
16	September 8, 2022	3.748% (1st)	3.697% (1st)
17	September 15, 2022	4.539% (1st)	4.757% (1st)
18	September 22, 2022	4.175% (1st)	4.094% (1st)
19	September 29, 2022	4.979% (1st)	4.786% (1st)
20	October 6, 2022	3.946% (1st)	4.068% (1st)
1	May 26, 2024	4.895% (2nd)	5.435% (2nd)
2	June 2, 2024	4.621% (1st)	5.075% (2nd)
3	June 9, 2024	4.839% (1st)	5.473% (1st)
4	June 16, 2024	4.790% (1st)	5.950% (1st)
5	June 23, 2024	5.192% (1st)	4.843% (2nd)
6	June 30, 2024	4.291% (2nd)	4.631% (2nd)
7	July 7, 2024	5.320% (2nd)	5.785% (2nd)
8	July 14, 2024	4.790% (2nd)	4.807% (2nd)
9	July 21, 2024	4.857% (2nd)	5.509% (2nd)
10	July 28, 2024	5.312% (2nd)	6.117% (2nd)
11	August 11, 2024	3.742% (2nd)	4.112% (2nd)
12	August 18, 2024	4.298% (2nd)	4.693% (2nd)
13	August 25, 2024	4.533% (2nd)	4.879% (2nd)
14	September 1, 2024	4.949% (2nd)	4.952% (2nd)
15	September 8, 2024	5.251% (2nd)	5.897% (2nd)
16	September 15, 2024	4.012% (2nd)	4.174% (2nd)
17	September 22, 2024	4.885% (2nd)	5.643% (2nd)
18	September 29, 2024	5.270% (2nd)	5.476% (2nd)
19	October 6, 2024	6.109% (2nd)	6.674% (2nd)
20	October 13, 2024	5.561% (2nd)	6.674% (2nd)
21	October 20, 2024	6.125% (2nd)	6.903% (2nd)
22	October 27, 2024	5.341% (2nd)	5.903% (2nd)
23	November 3, 2024	5.383% (2nd)	5.908% (2nd)
24	November 10, 2024	6.171% (2nd)	6.714% (2nd)
In the table above, the blue numbers represent the lowest ratings and the red numbers represent the highest ratings.; This drama airs on a cable channel/pay TV which normally has a relatively smaller audience compared to free-to-air TV/public broadcasters (KBS, SBS, MBC and EBS).
