= Paik Jong-won's Food Truck =

- Promotional poster
- Also known as: Paik's Food Truck
- Genre: Variety; Cooking
- Directed by: Kim Joon-soo; Lee Gwan-won; Jung Woo-jin
- Presented by: Paik Jong-won; Kim Sung-joo
- Country of origin: South Korea
- Original language: Korean
- No. of episodes: 22 (list of episodes)

Production
- Production location: South Korea
- Running time: 80 minutes

Original release
- Network: SBS
- Release: July 21 – December 29, 2017

Paik Jong-won's Food Truck (Korean: 백종원의 푸드트럭) is a South Korean cooking-variety program which was broadcast from July 21, 2017 to December 29, 2017. It is a spin-off of the cooking-variety program Paik Jong-won's Top 3 Chef King. The program was hosted by Paik Jong-won and Kim Sung-joo, it aired on SBS every Friday at 23:20 (KST).

Since January 5, 2018, the show was spun off to Baek Jong-won's Alley Restaurant.

== Broadcast Timeline ==
Broadcast Period	Broadcast Time (KST)	Remark
July 21, 2017 – December 29, 2017	Fridays at 23:20	Two consecutive parts (40 minutes/part)

== Cast ==
=== Host ===
- Paik Jong-won
- Kim Sung-joo

=== Special host ===
- Sunny (Girls' Generation) (Episode 97)

== List of Episodes ==
#	Episode #	Broadcast Date	Challenge Place	Challenger and Food	Remark
95	1	July 21	Gangnam station, Seoul	Seo Jin-gook (Bunsik); Park Gwang-seop (Hot Curry Hot dog); Hwang Do-han (Tteok-galbi Toast); Shim Andrewson (Cotton Candy); Im Jae-yong (Waffle); Kim Geon-il (Sweden Hot dog); Lee Hoon (Dak-kkochi)	Debut of the new format "Paik Jong-won's Food Truck", a national job creation project which help the food truck owners to improve the quality of dishes as well as sales or help the rookie owners to start their business.; Kim Sung-joo joined as host
96	2	July 28	Gangnam station, Seoul	Seo Jin-gook (Bunsik); Park Gwang-seop (Hot Curry Hot dog); Hwang Do-han (Tteok-galbi Toast); Shim Andrewson (Cotton Candy); Im Jae-yong (Waffle); Kim Geon-il (Sweden Hot dog); Lee Hoon (Dak-kkochi)	
97	3	August 4	Gangnam station, Seoul	Seo Jin-gook (Bunsik); Park Gwang-seop (Hot Curry Hot dog); Hwang Do-han (Tteok-galbi Toast); Shim Andrewson (Cotton Candy); Im Jae-yong (Waffle); Kim Geon-il (Sweden Hot dog); Lee Hoon (Dak-kkochi)	Special host: Sunny (Girls' Generation); Special appearances by Cosmic Girls, Dawon (SF9), N.Flying (Kim Jaehyun, Yoo Hoeseung), Sandeul (B1A4) as customers
98	4	August 11	Gangnam station, Seoul	Seo Jin-gook (Bunsik); Park Gwang-seop (Hot Curry Hot dog); Hwang Do-han (Tteok-galbi Toast); Shim Andrewson (Cotton Candy); Im Jae-yong (Waffle); Kim Geon-il (Sweden Hot dog); Lee Hoon (Dak-kkochi)	Special appearance by Kim Ji-min as customer
99	5	August 18	Suwon	Jeon Sung-hoon (Slush); Park Rae-yoon (Taiwanese Cheese Potatoes); Yoon Jin (Pork steak); Park Won-jae (Pasta); Fiestar's Cao Lu (Jianbing)	
100	6	August 25	Suwon	Jeon Sung-hoon (Slush); Park Rae-yoon (Taiwanese Cheese Potatoes); Yoon Jin (Pork steak); Park Won-jae (Pasta); Fiestar's Cao Lu (Jianbing)	
101	7	September 1	Suwon	Jeon Sung-hoon (Slush); Park Rae-yoon (Taiwanese Cheese Potatoes); Yoon Jin (Pork steak); Park Won-jae (Pasta); Fiestar's Cao Lu (Jianbing)	
102	8	September 8	Suwon	Jeon Sung-hoon (Slush); Park Rae-yoon (Taiwanese Cheese Potatoes); Yoon Jin (Pork steak); Park Won-jae (Pasta); Fiestar's Cao Lu (Jianbing)	
103	9	September 15	Suwon	Jeon Sung-hoon (Slush); Park Rae-yoon (Taiwanese Cheese Potatoes); Yoon Jin (Pork steak); Park Won-jae (Pasta); Fiestar's Cao Lu (Jianbing)	
104	10	September 22	Busan (near Busan Sajik Baseball Stadium)	Hwang Yoon-jeong: Bulgogi Burrito / Bulgogi Quesadilla; Before: Bulgogi Rice / Bulgogi Burger; "Yoon-ah Here!" Ha Jong-woo & Han Seon-woo: Stir-fried Chicken Leg Steak; Before: Deep-fried Sweet potato-Cheese Dumplings / Stir-fried Dak-Sundae; Seo Jeong-wook & Kim Sung-il: Flat Iron Grilled Steak; Park Shin-woo & Kim Tae-hwan: Stir-fried Pork chop Steak; Before: Mixed Egg-Kimchi-Vegetable-Pork Rice / Mixed Chili-Cheese-Shrimp Rice	
105	11	September 29	Busan (near Busan Sajik Baseball Stadium)	Hwang Yoon-jeong: Bulgogi Burrito / Bulgogi Quesadilla; Before: Bulgogi Rice / Bulgogi Burger; "Yoon-ah Here!" Ha Jong-woo & Han Seon-woo: Stir-fried Chicken Leg Steak; Before: Deep-fried Sweet potato-Cheese Dumplings / Stir-fried Dak-Sundae; Seo Jeong-wook & Kim Sung-il: Flat Iron Grilled Steak; Park Shin-woo & Kim Tae-hwan: Stir-fried Pork chop Steak; Before: Mixed Egg-Kimchi-Vegetable-Pork Rice / Mixed Chili-Cheese-Shrimp Rice	
106	12	October 13	Busan (near Busan Sajik Baseball Stadium)	Hwang Yoon-jeong: Bulgogi Burrito / Bulgogi Quesadilla; Before: Bulgogi Rice / Bulgogi Burger; "Yoon-ah Here!" Ha Jong-woo & Han Seon-woo: Stir-fried Chicken Leg Steak; Before: Deep-fried Sweet potato-Cheese Dumplings / Stir-fried Dak-Sundae; Seo Jeong-wook & Kim Sung-il: Flat Iron Grilled Steak; Park Shin-woo & Kim Tae-hwan: Stir-fried Pork chop Steak; Before: Mixed Egg-Kimchi-Vegetable-Pork Rice / Mixed Chili-Cheese-Shrimp Rice	
107	13	October 20	Busan (near Busan Sajik Baseball Stadium)	Hwang Yoon-jeong: Bulgogi Burrito / Bulgogi Quesadilla; Before: Bulgogi Rice / Bulgogi Burger; "Yoon-ah Here!" Ha Jong-woo & Han Seon-woo: Stir-fried Chicken Leg Steak; Before: Deep-fried Sweet potato-Cheese Dumplings / Stir-fried Dak-Sundae; Seo Jeong-wook & Kim Sung-il: Flat Iron Grilled Steak; Park Shin-woo & Kim Tae-hwan: Stir-fried Pork chop Steak; Before: Mixed Egg-Kimchi-Vegetable-Pork Rice / Mixed Chili-Cheese-Shrimp Rice	
108	14	October 27	Busan (near Busan Sajik Baseball Stadium)	Hwang Yoon-jeong: Bulgogi Burrito / Bulgogi Quesadilla; Before: Bulgogi Rice / Bulgogi Burger; "Yoon-ah Here!" Ha Jong-woo & Han Seon-woo: Stir-fried Chicken Leg Steak; Before: Deep-fried Sweet potato-Cheese Dumplings / Stir-fried Dak-Sundae; Seo Jeong-wook & Kim Sung-il: Flat Iron Grilled Steak; Park Shin-woo & Kim Tae-hwan: Stir-fried Pork chop Steak; Before: Mixed Egg-Kimchi-Vegetable-Pork Rice / Mixed Chili-Cheese-Shrimp Rice	
109	15	November 3	Gwangju	1. "Massimo Contaldo" Lee Do-heun (26): Wood-fired Pizza; 2. "Tasty Eel" Im Gwang-ryeol (30): Stir-fried Eel Steak & Vegetable; 3. "Highlight Dakgangjeong" Lee Gi-ja (59) & Lee Jae-woon (35): Stir-fried Sweet Spicy Crispy Chicken & Sweet potatoes with Prawn cracker; Round 2: Seasoned Skate with Vegetable & Deep-fried Foods with Lettuce; 4. "Yeodaesae" Kim Seung-jeong (31): Spicy Stir-fried Pork & Sour cream Sandwich; Round 1, 3, 4: Samgyeopsal & Spanish-style Garlic Shrimp Sandwich; Round 2: Hongeo-samhap; 5. "OMG Churro" Park Min-young (26): Churros & Dak-kkochi; 6. "A Meal" Choi Dae-min (30): Tteok-galbi Pilaf; Round 2: Spicy Zucchini Stew & Mr. Paik packed meals' side dishes; 7. "Sōmen" Song Ji-hoon (31) & So Ryong (28): Japanese Dak-guksu; 8. "Shish Kebab" Park Wan-hyung (30) & Oh Dae-chang (31): Shish kebab with Bokkeum-bap & Salad; 9. "Penguin Chicken" Lee Ji-man (28): Fusion Dak-bokkeum-tang & Tteok & Sugar-coated Sweet potatoes & Rice; 10. "Myung-goo's Hot dog" Oh Myung-goo (33): Kimchi-Meat Sauce Hot dog; 11. "Fat Sal" Kim San (28): Fatty Sandwich (Beef in Ssamjang cream sauce, French fries, Cheese sticks, Macaroni and cheese); 12. "Romantic Truck" Park Woo-jin (32): Indonesian Stir-fried Noodles; 13. "Kuru Kuru" Na Ae-ji (27): Takoyaki; 14. "Ok Hyang" Lee Mi-ok (35): Baguette with Cream Fusilli Pasta & Skewers; Round 2: So-Jeonbok-juk & Soy Braised Beef; 15. "Love Triangle" Park Tae-jin (36): Egg roll Sandwich; 16. "Plan F" Song Ho-kyung (28) & Song Hae-young (20): Pepper Japchae with Rice & Mandarin roll/Tortilla & Miso soup; Round 1–4: Pepper Japchae with Rice & Mandarin roll & Miso soup; 17. "Yummy Place" Kim So-young (27): Rice Croquettes & Spicy White Tteok-bokki; 18. "Assa Rabia" Kim Sung-gyun (38): Bulgogi Gyeran-mari with Rice ball & Seasoned Spring Onions; Round 1, 3, 4: Bulgogi Gyeran-mari & Seasoned Vegetables; Round 2: Hot dog-type Tteok-galbi with Seasoned Spring Onions; 19. "Upper-Lower Jeon" Kim Young (35): Assorted Jeon; 20. "Let's Eat" Park Se-hwi (32) & Han Chang-woo (27): Kebap; 21. "Phozy" Kim Young-wook (26): Rice noodles Soup; 22. "Cococok" Kim Nak-hyun (25) & Oh Da-bin (24): Coconut Pancake Dumplings	Survival of 22 teams to choose 7 final teams who will be given each a ₩40,000,000 (around $40,000) food truck to start their business; Round 1 (Ep. 109–110): Start business (10 minutes of preparation and 80 minutes of business); Judges: Director Yoon Joo-hee of Month Foodbank, Team leader Kim Jae-young of Gwangju Creation Economic Innovation Center, Team leader Jeong Hye-jeong of Gwangju City Hall Welfare Health Bureau, Executive producer Yoo Yoon-jae of Paik Jong-won's Food Truck; Group A: Teams 1–8; Advanced: "Highlight Dakgangjeong", "Tasty Eel", "Yeodaesae", "A Meal"; Group B: Teams 9–15; Advanced: "Myung-goo's Hot dog", "Fat Sal", "Penguin Chicken"; Group C: Teams 16–22; Advanced: "Plan F", "Assa Rabia"; Revival (picked by Mr. Paik): "Sōmen", "Shish Kebap", "Ok Hyang"; Round 2 (Ep. 111): Each team cooked for Mr. Paik (with ₩100,000 given for ingredients' cost, during three hours including preparation time); Eliminated: no team; Round 3 (Ep. 111–112): Cooking, make price and get evaluation out of 100 points (30 from rate of price/prime cost; 20 from food truck owners' qualifications' evaluation by Mr. Paik; 50 from price evaluation after dishes' tasting by ten customer representatives); Group A: "Highlight Dakgangjeong" (100), "Sōmen", "Myung-goo's Hot dog", "Penguin Chicken", "A Meal", "Shish Kebap" (30); Group B: "Plan F" (80), "Ok Hyang", "Fat Sal", "Yeodaesae", "Assa Rabia", "Tasty Eel"; Eliminated: "Shish Kebap", "Tasty Eel"; Round 4 (Ep. 113): Two teams formed a group in which each team with Mr. Paik observed the opponent's cooking process and tasted the dish then evaluated. The better team of each group (picked by Mr. Paik) would be given an advantage for the next round.; "A Meal" vs "Assa Rabia"; "Yeodaesae" vs "Ok Hyang"; "Plan F" vs "Highlight Dakgangjeong"; "Sōmen" vs "Penguin Chicken"; "Myung-goo's Hot dog" vs "Fat Sal"; Eliminated: no team; Final Round (Ep. 113–114): Ten teams divided into two groups which each will sell food for three hours to 50 customers who would vote for two teams that they want to visit again. The advantage of previous round is equivalent to extra five votes. Top 7 most votes' teams would have Mr. Paik's individual coaching and would be given each a ₩40,000,000 food truck.; Group A: "Sōmen" (31 votes), "Assarabia" (27 votes), "Penguin Chicken" (17 votes), "Plan F" (17 votes), "Ok Hyang" (13 votes); Group B: "Highlight Dakgangjeong" (40 votes), "A Meal" (28 votes), "Myung-goo's Hot dog" (20 votes), "Fat Sal" (16 votes), "Yeodaesae" (14 votes); Eliminated: "Fat Sal", "Yeodaesae", "Ok Hyang"; Special appearance by Cao Lu (Fiestar) on episode 115
110	16	November 10	Gwangju		
111	17	November 17	Gwangju		
112	18	November 24	Gwangju		
113	19	December 8	Gwangju		
114	20	December 15	Gwangju		
115	21	December 22	Gwangju		
116	22	December 29	Gwangju		
