= John Park (musician) =

American-Korean singer-songwriter (born 1988)

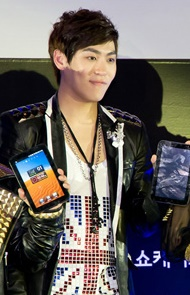
- Park at Samsung's Life is Tab showcase event in 2011
- Born: John Andrew Park; September 13, 1988 (age 38); Chicago, Illinois, U.S.
- Occupations: Singer; songwriter
- Spouse: Unknown (m. 2022)
- Children: 1
- Musical career
- Genres: R&B; Soul
- Instruments: Vocals; guitar; drums; piano
- Years active: 2010–present
- Label: Music Farm

John Andrew Park (Korean: 존 앤드류 박; born September 13, 1988) better known by the stage name John Park (Korean: 존 박), is an American singer-songwriter. He was a semi-finalist on the ninth season of American Idol, placing eighteenth. He is the runner-up of Superstar K 2, a Korean singing contest held by M.net. He is currently signed to Music Farm Entertainment.

== Early life ==
John Andrew Park was born in Chicago, Illinois, and attended Glenbrook North High School. He was a student at Northwestern University, where he majored in economics and was a member of the a cappella group Purple Haze.

== Career ==
=== American Idol season 9 ===
John Andrew Park auditioned in Chicago for the ninth season of American Idol with "I Love You More Than You'll Ever Know" by Blood, Sweat and Tears. The judges, especially Shania Twain, were impressed with his audition and he made it to the Hollywood round.

He also performed "Sweet Escape" in the group round along with Haeley Vaughn, Jessica Furney and Kelsey Madsen who was cut that round. He made it to the semi-finals. During the top 24, he sang Billie Holiday's "God Bless the Child" and John Mayer's "Gravity" for the top 20, but he was eliminated.

=== Superstar K 2 ===
After American Idol, Park entered the second season of the Korean talent show Superstar K 2, where he finished second.

== Personal life ==
John Andrew Park married his non-celebrity girlfriend on June 12, 2022. His wife gave birth to their first child, a daughter, on September 25, 2023.

== Discography ==
=== Studio albums ===
Title	Album details	Peak chart positions	Sales
Title	Album details	KOR	Sales
Inner Child	Released: July 3, 2013; Label: Music Farm; Format: CD, digital download	1	KOR: 8,209
PSST!	Released: October 30, 2024; Label: Music Farm; Format: CD, digital download, LP	51	KOR: 2,938

=== Extended plays ===
Title	EP details	Peak chart positions	Sales
Title	EP details	KOR	Sales
Knock	Released: February 23, 2012; Label: Music Farm; Format: CD, digital download	3	KOR: 18,741
Outbox	Released: July 12, 2021; Label: Music Farm; Format: digital download	—	

=== Singles ===
==== As lead artist ====
Title	Year	Peak chart positions		Album
Title	Year	KOR	KOR Hot	Album
"I'm Your Man"	2010	14	—	Non-album single
"Falling"	2012	4	6	Knock
"Childlike" (철부지)	2012	16	27	Inner Child
"Baby"	2013	23	13	Inner Child
"Alcohol" (술)	2014	71	59	Kang Seung Won Making Project Vol.1 Part.1
"U"	2014	34	—	Non-album singles
"Thought of You" (네 생각)	2016	17	—	Non-album singles
"DND (Do Not Disturb)"	2017	94	—	Non-album singles
"Smile"	2017	66	—	Non-album singles
"Understand"	2018	—	—	Non-album singles
"Hold Me" (잡아) (with Lim Chae Eon)	2019	—	—	Non-album singles
"March Lover" (3월 같은 너)	2020	—	—	Non-album singles
"Airplane Mode" (비행중 (수신끔)) (with Yelo)	2020	—	—	Non-album singles
"Daydreamer"	2021	— (Note: "Daydreamer" did not enter the Circle Digital Chart, but it peaked at number 61 on the component Download Chart.)	—	Non-album singles
"Now, Us, Here"	2021	— (Note: "Now, Us, Here" did not enter the Circle Digital Chart, but it peaked at number 61 on the component Download Chart.)	—	Outbox
"Places" (제자리)	2021	— (Note: "Places" did not enter the Circle Digital Chart, but it peaked at number 79 on the component Download Chart.)	—	Non-album singles
"Stay" (밤새 서로 미루다) (with Jeon Mi-do)	2021	50	51	Non-album singles
"Love Again"	2022	— (Note: "Love Again" did not enter the Circle Digital Chart, but it peaked at number 68 on the component Download Chart.)	—	Non-album singles
"Thought of You" (네 생각) (Sleep Mix)	2023	—	—	Non-album singles
"Vista" (featuring Gaeko & Thama)	2024	— (Note: "Vista" did not enter the Circle Digital Chart, but it peaked at number 60 on the component Download Chart.)	—	PSST!
"Bluff"	2024	— (Note: "Bluff" did not enter the Circle Digital Chart, but it peaked at number 58 on the component Download Chart.)	—	PSST!
"Like A Dream" (꿈처럼)	2024	— (Note: "Like A Dream" did not enter the Circle Digital Chart, but it peaked at number 61 on the component Download Chart.)	—	PSST!
"—" denotes releases that did not chart.

==== As featured artist ====
Title	Year	Peak chart positions		Album
Title	Year	KOR	KOR Hot	Album
"Happy Me" (Huh Gak featuring John Park)	2010	24	—	Huh Gak 1st Mini Album
"Switch" (Song Hye-kyo with John Park)	2012	35	22	Non-album single
"Would We Have Changed" (Younha featuring John Park)	2012	38	11	Supersonic
"Forever" (Kim Jin-pyo featuring John Park)	2013	35	—	JP 7
"Take It Slow" (서두르지 말아요) (Joe Won Sun with John Park)	2018	—	—	Non-album singles
"Street Carol" (ㄱㅓ리에서) (Young Posse with John Park)	2024	—	—	Non-album singles
"—" denotes releases that did not chart.

=== Soundtrack appearances ===
Title	Year	Peak chart positions	Album
Title	Year	KOR	Album
"I'll Give It All" (내가 다 줄게요)	2010	39	Superstar K2 Up to 11
"In the Rain" (빗속에서)	2010	9	Superstar K2 Up to 11
"My Best" (with Huh Gak)	2011	43	Glove OST
"Firelight" (불빛)	2013	88	Medical Top Team OST
"Fateful Love" (운명처럼)	2017	—	The Package OST
"Let Me Stay"	2018	—	Familiar Wife OST
"You're My Everything"	2019	—	Babel OST
"A Whole New World" (아름다운 세상) (with Lena Park)	2019	—	Aladdin (Korean Version OST)
"Foolish Love" (이상한 사람)	2019	— (Note: "Foolish Love" did not enter the Circle Digital Chart, but it peaked at number 91 on the component Download Chart.)	When the Camellia Blooms OST
"For Some Reason" (어쩐지 오늘)	2021	—	Lovestruck in the City OST
"I'm Always by Your Side"	2021	— (Note: "I'm Always by Your Side" did not enter the Circle Digital Chart, but it peaked at number 32 on the component Download Chart.)	Vincenzo OST
"Here I Am"	2021	—	Monthly Magazine Home OST
"Just" (그냥)	2021	—	Begin Again Open Mic Episode 20
"Nightfalling"	2021	—	Yumi's Cells OST
"The Day You Were Falling" (니가 내리는 날에)	2022	170	Forecasting Love and Weather OST
"Butterfly" (with various artists)	2025	— (Note: "Butterfly" did not enter the Circle Digital Chart, but it peaked at number 15 on the component Download Chart.)	Hangout with Yoo Winter Song
"Take Me" (with 1of1)	2025	—	Lost in Starlight OST
"Fine"	2025	—	Pro Bono OST
"—" denotes releases that did not chart.

=== Other charted songs ===
Title	Year	Peak chart positions	Album
Title	Year	KOR	Album
"This Ain't It" (이게 아닌데)	2012	31	Knock
"I Wonder Why" (왜 그럴까)	2012	42	Knock
"Good Day"	2012	47	Knock
"The Song" (그 노래)	2012	56	Knock
"Imagine"	2013	104	Inner Child
"Too Late"	2013	112	Inner Child
"Eraser" (지워져간다)	2013	145	Inner Child
"Again" (다시)	2013	162	Inner Child
"No More" (그만)	2013	191	Inner Child
"Where" (어디있나요)	2013	194	Inner Child
"Sipping My Life" (Bonus track)	2013	199	Inner Child

== Television series ==
Year	Show	Notes	Ref.
2010	American Idol	Contestant (Season 9)	
2012	Superstar K 2	Contestant	
2013–2014	Our Neighborhood Arts and Physical Education	Cast member	
2014	Law of the City (도시의법칙)	Cast member	
2016–2017	Secretly Greatly	Host	
2017	King of Mask Singer	Contestant (Episodes 115–116)	
2019	4 Wheeled Restaurant	Cast member (Season 3)	
2019	Wednesday Music Playlist	Cast member	
2021	The Da Vinci Note (다빈치노트)	Host, with Jang Sung-kyu and Jang Do-yeon	
2022	Love After Divorce: Birth of a Family (돌싱글즈 외전: 가족의 탄생)	Host, with Yoo Se-yoon	
2023	The Time Hotel	Cast member	
2023–2024	The Genius Paik	Cast member (Seasons 1 and 2)	
2024	Agents of Mystery	Cast member	
2026	The Devil's Plan	Contestant (Season 3)	

== Awards and nominations ==
Award ceremony	Year	Category	Nominee/work	Result	Ref.
Gaon Chart K-Pop Awards	2012	Best New Male Solo Artist	"Falling"	Won	
Golden Disc Awards	2013	New Rising Star	Knock	Nominated	
Golden Disc Awards	2017	Digital Song Bonsang	"Thought of You" (네 생각)	Nominated	
KBS Entertainment Awards	2013	Best Newcomer – Variety	Our Neighborhood Arts and Physical Education	Won	
Korean Music Awards	2025	Best Pop Album	PSST!	Won	
Korean Music Awards	2025	Best R&B & Soul Song	"Like A Dream" (꿈처럼)	Nominated	
Mnet Asian Music Awards	2012	Best New Male Artist	John Park	Nominated	
Mnet Asian Music Awards	2012	Best Vocal Performance – Solo	"Falling"	Nominated	
