= Dad! Where Are We Going? =

- Promotional poster for the first season
- Also known as: Dad! Where Are You Going?
- Genre: Variety show
- Country of origin: South Korea
- Original language: Korean
- No. of seasons: 2
- No. of episodes: 102

Production
- Running time: 75–95 minutes

Original release
- Network: Munhwa Broadcasting Corporation
- Release: January 6, 2013 – January 18, 2015

Related
- Sunday Night

Dad! Where Are We Going? (Korean: 아빠! 어디가?; RR: Appa! eodiga?) was a South Korean reality show featuring five celebrity fathers and their children as they travel to rural places and go on camping missions. The show debuted on MBC on January 6, 2013, as part of the Sunday Night programming block. The original cast members were announcer Kim Sung-joo, actor Lee Jong-hyuk, former soccer player Song Chong-gug, actor Sung Dong-il, and Vibe singer Yoon Min-soo (and their respective offspring).

Lee Jong-hyuk and Song Chong-gug left after season 1; Kim Sung-joo, Sung Dong-il and Yoon Min-soo remained, but Kim and Sung brought on different children for season 2. They were joined by former soccer player Ahn Jung-hwan, rapper Kim Jin-pyo, and actor Ryu Jin (and their respective offspring). Kim Jin-pyo left after several episodes (he stated he could not "blend in" with the other cast members), and was replaced by actor Jung Woong-in.

The series started off with a rather low rating of 7%, but it was 1.5% higher than I Am a Singer 2, also on MBC. On its 10th episode, it showed a great improvement with 13%, which surpassed KBS' Happy Sunday.

Due to its popularity in China, Hunan Television purchased the rights for a Chinese adaptation of the show, titled Where Are We Going, Dad?, which premiered on October 11, 2013. It was also very popularity in Vietnam, making Vietnam Television purchased the rights for a Vietnamese adaptation of the show, titled Bố ơi! Mình đi đâu thế?, which premiered on November 1, 2014 and become the only version that still active as of now.

After a two-year run, the show ended on January 18, 2015 and was replaced by Animals.

== Cast ==
=== Season 1 ===
Father	Child
Kim Sung-joo	Kim Min-gook (son)
Lee Jong-hyuk	Lee Jun-soo (son)
Song Chong-gug	Song Ji-a (daughter)
Sung Dong-il	Sung Jun (son)
Yoon Min-soo	Yoon Hoo (son)

=== Season 2 ===
Father	Child
Kim Sung-joo	Kim Min-yul (son)
Sung Dong-il	Sung Bin (daughter)
Yoon Min-soo	Yoon Hoo (son)
Ahn Jung-hwan	Ahn Ri-hwan (son)
Ryu Jin	Im Chan-hyung (son)
Kim Jin-pyo	Kim Gyu-won (daughter) Left mid-season and replaced by Jung Woong-in and daughter.
Jung Woong-in	Jung Se-yoon (daughter)

== International versions ==
Country/Region	Local title	Network	Premiere date	Season(s)
South Korea; Original	Dad! Where Are We Going? 아빠! 어디가?	MBC	January 6, 2013	2
China	Where Are We Going, Dad? Simplified Chinese: 爸爸去哪儿	HBS	October 11, 2013	5
Vietnam	Dad! Where Are We Going? Vietnamese: Bố ơi! Mình đi đâu thế?	VTV	November 1, 2014	6
Russia	Dad! Where Are We Going?	TBA	Late 2014	1
Japan	Dad! Where Are We Going? Japanese : パパ、どこ行くの？	TBS	November 5, 2015	1
Bhutan	Dad! Where Are We Going? Bhutan: 2017?	TBA	TBA	TBA

== Awards and nominations ==
Year	Award	Category	Result
2013	49th Baeksang Arts Awards	Best Entertainment Program	Won
