= Saemaeul Restaurant =

Korean barbecue chain restaurant

- Native name: 새마을식당
- Romanized name: Saemaeul Sikdang
- Industry: Chain restaurant
- Founded: 2005; 20 years ago
- Founder: Paik Jong-won
- Area served: South Korea; Japan; China; Hong Kong; United States; Canada; Australia; Thailand; Vietnam
- Website: newmaul.com (South Korean homepage)

Saemaeul Restaurant (Korean: 새마을식당), name also rendered as Saemaeul Sikdang, is a South Korean multinational Korean barbecue chain restaurant. The restaurant first opened in South Korea in 2005, and has locations in South Korea, Japan, China, the United States, Hong Kong, the Philippines, Thailand, Vietnam, and Australia. In South Korea, the chain reportedly had 101 locations in 2023, with all of them operating as franchise restaurants.

The restaurant's representative dishes are its yeontan bulgogi and its 7-minute kimchi-jjigae. The restaurant is one of several restaurant chains run by South Korean entrepreneur and celebrity chef Paik Jong-won, under his company Theborn Korea.
