= Animals (South Korean TV program) =

- Genre: Reality television
- Created by: MBC
- Directed by: Kim Hyun-chul; Je Young-jae
- Starring: Park Joon-hyung; Kwon Yuri; Eunhyuk; Seo Jang-hoon; Yoon Do-hyun; Jang Dong-min; Kim Jun-hyun; KangNam; Jo Jae-yoon; Kwak Dong-yeon; Don Spike
- Country of origin: South Korea
- Original language: Korean
- No. of seasons: 1
- No. of episodes: 10

Production
- Production locations: South Korea; Guangzhou, China
- Running time: 60 minutes

Original release
- Network: MBC
- Release: January 25 – March 29, 2015

Related
- Sunday Night

Animals (Korean: 애니멀즈) is a South Korean reality-variety show; a part of MBC's Sunday Night lineup, along with Real Men. It first aired on January 25, 2015 replacing Dad! Where Are We Going?. It features eleven celebrities who experience living with a variety of animals in an area created for the show called Animal Town. On March 16, 2015, MBC confirmed that the show would be cancelled after 3 months due to low ratings. The show ended on March 29, 2015 and was replaced by King of Mask Singer.

== Background ==
On January 5, MBC announced that a pilot program would be replacing Dad! Where Are We Going?. They also stated that Animals would be a show about stars raising pet animals and that the directors of the show would be Kim Hyun-chul (Tears in Amazon) and Je Young-jae (Infinite Challenge). The first confirmed member of the show was former basketball player, Seo Jang-hoon. Days later, several articles were released, confirming the 10 remaining members, g.o.d's Park Joon-hyung, comedians Jang Dong-min& Kim Jun-hyun, songwriter Don Spike, actors Jo Jae-yoon & Kwak Dong-yeon, singer Yoon Do-hyun, M.I.B's KangNam, Super Junior's Eunhyuk, and the sole female member of the cast, Girls' Generation's Kwon Yuri.

For the filming of the segment, 'Three Bears', Park Joon-hyung, Yuri, Jang Dong-min and Kwak Dong-yeon visited the Chimelong Safari Park in Guangzhou, China to meet the panda triplets.

== Format ==
The show was originally divided in three segments. Park Joon-hyung, Kwak Dong-yeon, Jang Dong-min and Yuri in the segment, 'Three Bears', where they visit a zoo in China to meet the panda triplets, Seo Jang-hoon, Don Spike and KangNam in the segment 'A dog went to kindergarten' where they visit a kindergarten and babysit six children and some dogs, Kim Jun-hyun, Eunhyuk, Jo Jae-yoon and Yoon Do-hyun in the segment 'OK Farm' where they experience living with animals such as ostriches, goats, sheep, donkeys, calves and pigs.

=== Cancellation of 'Three Bears' ===
On February 9, 2015, MBC released a statement saying the segment 'Three Bears' will be cancelled, due to reports of Canine Distemper Virus spreading among the pandas. The viral disease has already caused the death of four pandas in China in the past few months, and the Chinese government decided to prohibit contact between non-zoo officials and the pandas. With the February 8 episode being the last episode with the segment, the show will continue with the two remaining segments, 'A dog went to kindergarten' and 'OK Farm'.

== Cast ==
Segment	Name
Three Bears	Park Joon-hyung; Kwak Dong-yeon; Jang Dong-min; Yuri
A dog went to kindergarten	Seo Jang-hoon; Don Spike; KangNam
OK Farm	Kim Jun-hyun; Jo Jae-yoon; Yoon Do-hyun; Eunhyuk

== Ratings ==
In the ratings below, the highest rating for the show will in be red, and the lowest rating for the show will be in blue.

List of ratings

Episode #	Original Airdate	TNmS Ratings		AGB Ratings	
Episode #	Original Airdate	Nationwide	Seoul National Capital Area	Nationwide	Seoul National Capital Area
1	January 25, 2015			4.7%	
2	February 1, 2015			4.3%	
