= Pepper steak =

Chinese American steak dish

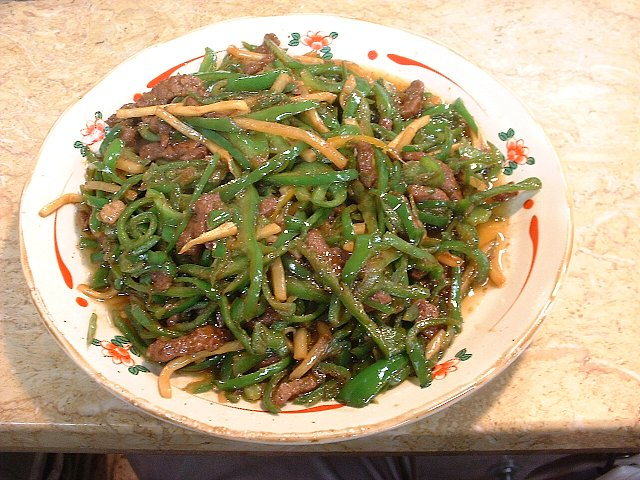
- Place of origin: China
- Serving temperature: Hot
- Main ingredients: Beef, bell peppers, bamboo shoots

Pepper steak (Chinese: 青椒牛肉; pinyin: qīngjiāoniúròu; lit. 'green pepper beef') is a stir-fried Chinese dish consisting of sliced beef steak (often flank, sirloin, or round) cooked with sliced bell peppers and seasonings such as soy sauce and ginger, and usually thickened with cornstarch. Sliced onions, bamboo shoots, and bean sprouts are also frequent additions to the recipe.

Evidence for the dish's existence in the United States dates from at least 1948. The dish originated from Fujian cuisine, where it was known as qīngjiāo ròusī (青椒肉丝, green pepper shredded pork). (A somewhat similar dish, 农家小炒肉 or nóngjiā xiǎo chǎoròu "country-style small stir-fried pork", also exists in Hunan cuisine.) In the original Fujian dish, the meat used was pork and the seasonings were relatively light compared to pepper steak.
