= Paik Jong-won's Top 3 Chef King =

2015 South Korean television program

- Promotional poster
- Also known as: Paik Jong-won's Three Great Emperors, Paik Jong-won's 3 Great Kings, Paik Jong-won's Top 3 Chef King
- Hangul: 백종원의 3대 천왕
- RR: Baek Jongwonui 3dae cheonwang
- MR: Paek Chongwŏnŭi 3tae ch'ŏnwang
- Genre: Variety; Cooking
- Directed by: Kim Joon-soo; Lee Gwan-won; Jung Woo-jin
- Presented by: Paik Jong-won; Kim Jun-hyun; Lee Hwi-jae
- Country of origin: South Korea
- Original language: Korean
- No. of episodes: 94 (list of episodes)

Production
- Running time: 80 minutes

Original release
- Network: SBS
- Release: August 28, 2015 – July 14, 2017

Paik Jong-won's Top 3 Chef King (Korean: 백종원의 3대 천왕) is a South Korean cooking-variety program which has been broadcast since August 28, 2015.

From July 21, 2017, the program was spun off to Paik Jong-won's Food Truck.

Since January 5, 2018, it was again spun off to Paik Jong-won's Alley Restaurant.

== Broadcast Timeline ==
Broadcast Period	Broadcast Time (KST)	Remark
August 28, 2015 – January 22, 2016	Fridays at 23:25	80 minutes
January 30, 2016 – April 8, 2017	Saturdays at 18:10	110 minutes
April 14, 2017 – June 9, 2017	Fridays at 23:20	Two consecutive parts (40 minutes/part)
June 16, 2017 – July 14, 2017	Fridays at 23:20	80 minutes

== Cast ==
=== Main host ===
Main host

- Paik Jong-won (Episodes 1–94)
- Kim Jun-hyun (Episodes 1–94)
- Lee Hwi-jae (Episodes 1–62)
- Hani (EXID) (Episodes 22–51)
- Soyou (Sistar) (Episodes 52–62)
- Lee Si-young (Episodes 62–90)

Fixed guest

- Kim Ji-min (Episodes 34–94)
- Kim Hwan (Episodes 42–59)

=== Special host ===
- Twice (Tzuyu, Dahyun) (Episode 27)
- Hong Jin-young (Episode 28)
- Jung Eun-ji (Apink) (Episode 29)
- Park Seon-young (Episode 30)
- Han Chae-ah (Episodes 91–94)

== List of Episodes ==
=== 2015 ===
Episodes 1–17

Episode	Broadcast Date	Food Theme	Main Guests	Remark
1	August 28	Pork bulgogi	Kim Yoon-sang, Kim Seon-jae, Kim Woo-joo, Leah	
2	September 4	Dak-bokkeum-tang	Dreamcatcher, Kim Yoon-sang, Yoon Hyun-jin	
3	September 11	Tteok-bokki	April	
4	September 18	Tonkatsu	Unicorn	
5	September 25	Kal-guksu	Sonamoo	
6	October 2	Nakji-bokkeum	Jjarimongttang	
7	October 9	Bibimbap	Melody Day	
8	October 16	Barbecue chicken	Lee Hye-seung, Yoon Hyun-jin, So Yoo-mi	
9	October 23	Jjamppong	Berry Good	
10	November 6	Spicy Pork	TAHITI	
11	November 13	Gukbap	Laboum	
12	November 20	Budae-jjigae	SEVENTEEN	
13	November 27	Jeon	Twice	
14	December 4	Jajangmyeonida	BESTie	
15	December 11	Korean fried chicken	Purfles	
16	December 18	Guksup	Lovelyz	
17	December 25	Tteok-bokki (part 2)	GFriend	

=== 2016 ===
Episodes 17–67

Episode	Broadcast Date	Food Theme	Main Guests	Remark
18	January 1	Samgyeopsal	Hong Yoon-hwa, Laboum	
19	January 8	Jokbal	Hong Jin-young, April	
20	January 15	Haejang-guk	EXID	
21	January 22	Top 3 Chef King's Most Preferred Menus	Hong Yoon-hwa, Twice	
22	January 30	Pork ribs	Fiestar	First episode of Hani as host
23	February 6	Mandu	Red Velvet	
24	February 13	Sundae	Dal Shabet	
25	February 20	Tangsuyuk	Cao Lu (Fiestar), Lee Soo-min, Laboum	
26	February 27	Guksu (part 2)	MADTOWN, 4Minute (Jihyun, Sohyun)	
27	March 5	Samgyeopsal (part 2)	Kim Ji-min, Twice	Special host: Twice (Tzuyu, Dahyun)
28	March 12	Gomguk	Kim Ji-min, Fiestar, NU'EST	Special host: Hong Jin-young
29	March 19	Dak-galbi	Baro (B1A4), Hong Yoon-hwa, Oh My Girl	Special host: Jung Eun-ji (Apink)
30	March 26	Tonkatsu (part 2)	Kim Hwan, Kim Yoon-sang, Yoon Hyun-jin, Yoo Young-mi, Lee Byung-hee	Special host: Park Seon-young
31	April 2	Gimbap	Mamamoo, Jang Do-yeon	
32	April 9	Bread	Eun Ga-eun, Cosmic Girls	
33	April 16	Jajangmyeon (part 2)	HEYNE, Laboum	
34	April 23	Squid	Ladies' Code	First episode of Kim Ji-min as fixed guest
35	April 30	Bulgogi	BtoB	
36	May 7	Barbecue chicken (part 2)	Twice, CLC	
37	May 14	Ramyeon	Andy Lee (Shinhwa), Teen Top	
38	May 21	Naengmyeon	B1A4	
39	May 28	Mulhoe (Spicy Raw Fish Soup)	VIXX	
40	June 4	Chicken (Dak-gomtang, Samgye-tang, Chicken in a hot pot)	Oh My Girl, Kim Hwan	
41	June 11	Summer Guksu	Boys Republic, Park Bo-ram	
42	June 18	The Meal of Life	Lee Yoon-ah, Kim Seon-jae	First episode of Kim Hwan as fixed guest
43	June 25	Gamja-tang	Laboum	
44	July 2	Partner Special	Choi Hwa-jung, Lee Keun-Ho, Kim Heung-gook, Andy Lee (Shinhwa)	
45	July 9	Summer Vacation Special		
46	July 16	Bunsik	Cosmic Girls, Soyou (Sistar)	
47	July 23	Market Special	DIA	
48	July 30	Cinema Paradise Special	Gugudan	
49	August 6	Olympic Special	Brave Girls, Kim Yeon-koung	
50	August 13	Fire Fighters Special		
51	August 20	1st Anniversary Special	Laboum	Last episode of Hani as host
52	August 27	Jokbal & Dakbal	Ha Jae-sook, Kangnam (M.I.B)	First episode of Soyou as co-host
53	September 3	Seafood Kal-guksu & Eotang (Fish stew)	Ha Jae-sook, Kangnam (M.I.B)	
54	September 10	Jeon & Pizza	Choi Jung-woo, Alberto Mondi	
55	September 17	Best of Best Restaurants' Highlights		Re-broadcast some parts of the previous episodes
56	September 24	Mandu & Sujebi	Sam Okyere, Kwon Hyuk-soo	
57	October 8	Jajangmyeon & Jjamppong	Lee Guk-joo, Heo Young-ji	
58	October 15	Tteok-bokki & Sundae	Ji Sang-ryeol, Jun Hyo-seong (Secret)	
59	October 22	Busan Special	Kim Kwang-kyu, Bora (Sistar)	
60	October 29	Pork ribs & Bossam	Kim Kwang-kyu, Cheng Xiao (Cosmic Girls)	Last episode of Kim Hwan as fixed guest
61	November 5	Udon & Tonkatsu	Kim Joon-ho, Twice (Dahyun, Chaeyoung)	
62	November 19	Jjimdak & Korean fried chicken	Lee Jun-hyeok, Apink (Jung Eun-ji, Oh Ha-young)	Last episode of Lee Hwi-jae as host and Soyou as co-host
63	December 3	Winter Bunsik	Defconn, Sandeul (B1A4)	First episode of Lee Si-young as host
64	December 10	Haejang-guk (part 2)	Gong Myung, Min Jin-woong	
65	December 17	Ramyeon & Hamburger	Park Chul-min, Tei, YooA (Oh My Girl)	
66	December 24	Gopchang & Nakji	Kang Min-kyung (Davichi), Oh Dae-hwan	
67	December 31	Pasta & Hamburg steak	Jinyoung (B1A4), Kim Yoon-ah (Jaurim)	New Year's Eve Special

=== 2017 ===
Episodes 68–95

Episode	Broadcast Date	Food Theme	Main Guests	Remark
68	January 7	Jeonju's Five Flavors	BTS (Jin, J-Hope)	
69	January 14	World Guksu	I.O.I (Chaeyeon (DIA), Sejeong (Gugudan)), Thunder	
70	January 21	National Jjigae	Tony An, Shoo (S.E.S.)	
71	January 28	Winter Health Food	Jung Shi-ah, AOA (Choa, Mina)	Seollal Special
72	February 4	Bapdoduk (Rice Thief)	Kangnam, Jeon Hye-bin	
73	February 11	Daegu's Five Flavor Alleys	Kim Min-kyung, Key (SHINee), Irene (Red Velvet)	
74	February 18	Beef	Kim Wan-sun, Kim Jong-min, Kim Dong-jun (ZE:A), DinDin	
75	February 25	Kkochi	Park Na-rae, Kim Joon-ho, Mina Fujii	
76	March 4	University's Restaurant Special	BtoB (Sungjae, Peniel), Shin (Cross Gene), Hong Jin-young	
77	March 11	Spring Special	Choi Min-yong, Jessi, Eric Nam, GFriend (Yerin, Yuju)	
78	March 18	Spicy Flavor Special	Sandara Park, Jung Yong-hwa (CNBLUE), Shindong (Super Junior), Solbin (Laboum), Dawon (SF9)	
79	March 25	Jeju Province Special	Girl's Day	
80	April 1	Taxi Drivers' Favorite Restaurant Special	Jang Yun-jeong, Hyoyeon (Girls' Generation), SEVENTEEN (Mingyu, Seungkwan)	
81	April 8	Mountain Climbing Road Special	Yoon Taek, Ye Jeong-hwa, Nara (Hello Venus), Kim Dong-hyun	
82	April 14	School Bunsik	Red Velvet (Seulgi, Irene), Roy Kim, DinDin	
83	April 21	Travel to Jeollanam-do	Son Hoyoung (g.o.d), Jeong Jinwoon (2AM), WINNER (Lee Seung-hoon, Kang Seung-yoon)	
84	April 28	Gangwon-do's Flavor Special	Noh Sa-yeon, Hong Soo-hyun, P. O (Block B)	
85	May 5	Pork Party	Kim Yong-man, Lee Jung-shin (CNBLUE), Jimin (AOA), Rowoon (SF9)	
86	May 12	Pojangmacha	Oh Yoon-ah, Rose Motel (Yook Joong-wan, Kang Joon-woo)	
87	May 19	Adult-only Flavor Special	Twice	
88	May 26	Food Pairings with Beer	HIGHLIGHT (except Yoon Doo-joon)	
89	June 2	World Cuisine Festival	Kim Tae-woo (g.o.d), Park So-hyun, Johyun (Berry Good)	
90	June 9	Naeng-guksu Special	Gummy, Choi Yoon-young, Heo Kyung-hwan	Last episode of Lee Si-young as host
91	June 16	Tokyo Eating Tour	Kim Young-chul, Gugudan (Sejeong, Nayoung)	First episode of Han Chae-ah as special host; Kim Young-chul became the special chef to make monjayaki
92	June 23	Hong Kong Special	Kim Min-jong, Hwang Chi-yeul, Solar (Mamamoo)	
93	June 30	Beef Special	F.T. Island (Lee Hong-gi, Choi Jong-hoon), Kyungri (Nine Muses), Parc Jae-jung	
94	July 7	Chinese cuisine's Partner Menu	Kang Susie, Chae Yeon, iKON (Jay, Bobby)	Last episode of Kim Jun-hyun as host, Han Chae-ah as special host, Kim Ji-min as fixed guest
95	July 14	"The Nations' Big Three" Format's Highlights	no guest	End of the format "The Nations' Big Three"

== Awards and nominations ==
Year	Award	Category	Recipient	Result
2016	10th SBS Entertainment Awards	PD Award	Kim Jun-hyun	Won
2016	10th SBS Entertainment Awards	Top Excellence Award in Talk Show	Kim Jun-hyun	Nominated
2016	10th SBS Entertainment Awards	Rookie Award, Female	Lee Si-young	Nominated
2016	10th SBS Entertainment Awards	Special Award	Paik Jong-won	Won
2016	10th SBS Entertainment Awards	Best Couple Award	Paik Jong-won and Kim Jun-hyun	Nominated
2017	11th SBS Entertainment Awards	Achievement Award	Paik Jong-won	Won
