= Fabrizio Ferrari =

Italian chef in South Korea

- Born: c. 1980
- Occupation: Chef
- Culinary career
- Cooking style: Korean; Italian
- Rating
- Michelin star
- Current restaurant
- Al Porticciolo 84

Fabrizio Ferrari (born c. 1980), also called Fabri (Korean: 파브리), is an Italian chef in South Korea. He received a Michelin star for his seafood restaurant Al Porticciolo 84 in Italy in 2005. His restaurant maintained that status for 15 consecutive years. He has since become a celebrity chef in South Korea, and has appeared in television programs there. He also has a YouTube channel called Italy Fabri. By 2022, he had over 140,000 subscribers.

== Career ==
He grew up in a family of restaurateurs. He majored in business in college. He worked in a company in 2004, but at age 22 quit to run his family's restaurant. In 2010, he reportedly worked with Korean sous-chefs that were attending a culinary school in Italy. There, he became exposed to Korean cuisine for the first time. He learned how to make kimchi and ferment various foods in Korean cuisine. He began incorporating Korean flavors into Italian dishes. In 2016, he was invited to compete in a Korean food competition held by the Korean Consulate General in Milan, and placed first. He then appeared on the KBS contest Global Taste of Korea. In 2018, he appeared on the program Hansik Battle for three months. He moved to South Korea in 2019, and began teaching at Woosong University in Daejeon. He also appeared in Baek's Class. He appeared on the 2024 Netflix program Culinary Class Wars.

He brought his wife and daughter to South Korea.
