= 1theK Originals =

South Korean web series

1theK Originals, formerly LOEN TV (Korean: 로엔 TV), is a South Korean web series, produced by Kakao M. It is shown on the label's official YouTube channel.

== History ==
=== 2011: Debut ===
LOEN TV started in 2011, also going under the name LOEN Bangsong (로엔 방송, LOEN broadcast). At first, it only covered IU. It has six episodes.

=== 2012: Comeback ===
In 2012, LOEN TV came back with three new episodes covering IU's Japanese tour.

==== 2012: Introduction of segments ====
In the same year, LOEN TV launched segments. Ask in a Box started in October 2012 with Gain as debut star followed by CSI: Coming Soon Interview (Girl's Day), Let's Dance (November 2012, Girl's Day), LOEN TV Live (December 2012, Sunny Hill and Yoon Hyun-sang), Special Feature (December 2012, Kim Sung-kyu), Run to You (March 2013, Kim Tae-woo), I'M: Introduce Myself (April 2013, Yoo Ji-ae) and Wonder Live (September 2013, Lyn).

==== 2014 ====
Due to the change of LOEN's music distribution brand from LOEN Music to 1theK, the web series became "1theK Originals".

== Background ==
=== Segments ===
As of 2015, it has 14 segments.

==== Ask in a Box ====
It is about asking guest artists different questions. LOEN gets the questions from "likers" (subscribers) of its Facebook page (fb.me/1theK).

List of Ask in a Box guests

2016

- 2016.10.15 - BTS

2014

- 2014.7.25 - B1A4
- 2014.5.15 - EXO-K
- 2014.5.14 - EXO-K
- 2014.1.8 - TVXQ

2013

- 2013.12.5 - 2AM
- 2013.10.17 - IU
- 2013.9.18 - G-Dragon
- 2013.9.1 - Seungri
- 2013.8.13 - Brown Eyed Girls
- 2013.7.29 - XIA
- 2013.7.16 - Dynamic Duo
- 2013.6.25 - Sistar
- 2013.5.27 - Lee Min-ho
- 2013.5.23 - 2PM
- 2013.4.11 - Infinite
- 2013.2.5 - MYNAME
- 2013.1.24 - Ock Joo-hyun
- 2013.1.20 - Boyfriend
- 2013.1.2 - Sunny Hill

2012

- 2012.12.9 - Lee Seung-gi
- 2012.11.30 - Orange Caramel
- 2012.11.27 - Roh Ji-hoon
- 2012.11.14 - Noel
- 2012.11.11 - B.A.P
- 2012.11.6 - Girl's Day
- 2012.11.4 - Ailee
- 2012.11.1 - Block B
- 2012.10.31 - John Park
- 2012.10.29 - Secret
- 2012.10.25 - K.Will
- 2012.10.17 - Ga-in

==== CSI: Comeback Special Interview ====
It shows interviews on guest artists and their new releases (album, single etc.). It was formerly called CSI: Coming Soon Interview until October 10, 2013.

List of CSI: Comeback Special Interview guests

2014

- 2014.2.5 - Ga-in (with Show Lo) Truth or Dare
- 2014.2.2 - B.A.P 1004 (Angel)
- 2014.1.26 - Sunny Hill Don't Say Anything
- 2014.1.17 - Gary No Cut Special: Gary's Special Confession
- 2014.1.15 - Gary Shower Later / Zotto Mola
- 2014.1.12 - B1A4 Lonely

2013

- 2013.12.8 - Sweet Sorrow Again and Again
- 2013.11.21 - History What am I to You
- 2013.11.20 - San E Break-Up Dinner (featuring Sanchez)
- 2013.10.24 - Shin Seung-hun Sorry
- 2013.10.10 - Nine Muses Gun
- 2013.9.26 - Song Jieun False Hope
- 2013.8.29 - KARA Damaged Lady
- 2013.8.21 - Sunmi 24 Hours
- 2013.8.7 - Girl's Day DEUX 20th Anniversary Tribute Album Part I: In Summer
- 2013.6.16 - Choi Jin-hyuk Best Wishes to You
- 2013.6.2 - Rainbow Sunshine
- 2013.5.8 - Orange Caramel, 10cm re;code Episode IV: Hug Song
- 2013.5.2 - UV Because of You
- 2013.4.4 - Ga-in, Cho Hyung-woo Brunch
- 2013.4.3 - Sunny Hill, Daybreak Love Actually
- 2013.3.27 - Ra.D Thank You
- 2013.3.14 - Davichi Just the Two of Us
- 2013.3.12 - Girl's Day Expect
- 2013.2.25 - Woo-hyun, Lucia re;code Episode II: Cactus
- 2013.2.20 - Jeong Hyeong-don and Daejune Hemensahang / Get Out
- 2013.2.17 - SHINee Dream Girl
- 2013.2.11 - Nu'est Hello
- 2013.1.29 - Sistar19 Gone Not Around Any Longer
- 2013.1.21 - Eric Nam Heaven's Door
- 2013.1.1 - Baek Ji-young Hate

2012

- 2012.12.12 - Sunny Hill Goodbye to Romance
- 2012.12.10 - Jungyup No More Us
- 2012.12.6 - 100% (A) Guy Like Me
- 2012.12.4 - Kim Jang-hoon Someday
- 2012.12.2 - Secret Talk That, Nell White Night
- 2012.11.25 - Boom Beautiful
- 2012.11.21 - Lee Seung-gi Return
- 2012.11.20 - Spica Lonely
- 2012.11.13 - C-Clown Far Away... Young Love
- 2012.11.8 - Boyfriend I Yah, Fiestar We Don't Stop
- 2012.11.5 - Roh Ji-hoon Punishment
- 2012.10.30 - Geeks re;code Episode I: Officially Missing You, Too
- 2012.10.26 - Girl's Day Don't Forget Me

==== Let's Dance ====
It teaches viewers moves from the latest K-pop dance crazes.

List of Let's Dance performances

2014

- 2014.4.2 - Crayon Pop "Uh-ee"
- 2014.3.17 - Orange Caramel "Catallena"
- 2014.2.13 - Ladies' Code "So Wonderful"
- 2014.1.22 - Got7 "Girls Girls Girls"
- 2014.1.20 - Dal Shabet "B.B.B (Big Baby Baby)"
- 2014.1.6 - Girl's Day "Something"

2013

- 2013.12.22 - Secret "I Do I Do"
- 2013.12.15 - Nine Muses "Glue"
- 2013.12.4 - History "What am I to You"
- 2013.12.2 - Tasty "Day 'n Night"
- 2013.11.4 - Fiestar "I Don't Know"
- 2013.11.3 - A-JAX "Snake"
- 2013.10.23 - Nine Muses "Gun"
- 2013.10.22 - BESTie " Love Options"
- 2013.10.20 - Kahi "It's Me" (featuring Dumbfoundead)
- 2013.10.16 - Tiny-G "Miss You"
- 2013.9.23 - KARA "Damaged Lady"
- 2013.9.4 - Teen Top "Rocking"
- 2013.8.28 - Nu'est "Sleep Talking"
- 2013.8.26 - History "Tell Me Love"
- 2013.8.19 - Tasty "MAMAMA"
- 2013.8.5 - Crayon Pop "Bar Bar Bar"
- 2013.7.18 - BESTie " Pitapat"
- 2013.7.10 - MYNAME "Baby I'm Sorry"
- 2013.7.2 - Dal Shabet " Be Ambitious"
- 2013.6.30 - Sunny Hill "Darling of All Hearts" (featuring Hareem)
- 2013.6.10 - Rainbow "Sunshine"
- 2013.5.29 - 100% "Want U Back"
- 2013.5.22 - Nine Muses "WILD"
- 2013.5.15 - Secret "YooHoo"
- 2013.5.13 - SHINee "Why So Serious?"
- 2013.5.12 - T-ara N4 "Jeon Won Diary"
- 2013.4.24 - C-Clown "Shaking Heart"
- 2013.3.20 - Girl's Day "Expect"
- 2013.3.18 - RaNia "Just Go"
- 2013.3.4 - Teen Top "Miss Right"
- 2013.2.27 - Nu'est "Hello"
- 2013.2.24 - B.A.P "One Shot"
- 2013.2.4 - Nine Muses "Dolls"
- 2013.1.31 - DMTN "Safety Zone"
- 2013.1.28 - Tiny-G "Minimanimo"
- 2013.1.7 - GLAM "I Like That"

2012

- 2012.12.11 - Spica "Lonely"
- 2012.12.4 - Secret "Talk That"
- 2012.11.13 - Girl's Day "Don't Forget Me"

==== LOEN TV Live ====
It features live performances and interviews on artists.

List of LOEN TV Live guests

2014

- 2014.1.19 - Rumble Fish

2013

- 2013.8.25 - Bumkey, San E
- 2013.8.6 - Kim Greem
- 2013.7.18 - Sweet Sorrow
- 2013.4.21 - Lunafly
- 2013.4.10 - Sunny Hill, Daybreak
- 2013.3.24 - Bobby Kim, Kingston Rudieska
- 2013.3.12 - Lim Jeong-hee, Herz Analog

2012

- 2012.12.27 - Sunny Hill
- 2012.12.23 - Sunny Hill
- 2012.12.20 - Roh Ji-hoon
- 2012.12.19 - Ailee
- 2012.12.16 - Sunny Hill, Yoon Hyun-sang

==== Special Feature ====
It features interview on an artist, with a twist. The twist is that the interviewer is the same artist.

List of Special Feature guests

2013

- 2013.7.7 - John Park Baby
- 2013.4.7 - K.Will Love Blossom
- 2013.3.28 - Choiza Going Down
- 2013.2.19 - Kim Tae-woo Cosmic Girl
- 2013.1.27 - Moon Hee-joon I'm Not OK
- 2013.1.6 - JeA While You're Sleeping

2012

- 2012.12.17 - Kim Sung-kyu 60 Seconds / I Need You

==== Run to You ====
It features a special live event presented by a K-pop artist.

List of Run to You guests
- 2013.12.3 - Fiestar
- 2013.8.1 - Koyote
- 2013.7.9 - Sunny Hill
- 2013.6.26 - Baek A-yeon
- 2013.4.16 - Jun Guk-gu of Gag Concert
- 2013.3.7 - Kim Tae-woo

==== I'M: Introduce Myself ====
It aims to introduce "rookies" (new singers) of K-pop.

List of I'M: Introduce Myself guests

2014

- 2014.2.9 - Soyou, Junggigo

2013

- 2013.12.25 - Swings
- 2013.11.25 - Shin Ji-hoon
- 2013.11.24 - 100% V
- 2013.11.18 - NC.A
- 2013.11.7 - Led Apple
- 2013.10.27 - Fiestar
- 2013.10.13 - MYNAME
- 2013.10.7 - Kye Bum-joo
- 2013.9.24 - Electroboyz
- 2013.9.15 - BTS
- 2013.9.9 - Ladies' Code
- 2013.8.12 - Tasty
- 2013.7.21 - A-JAX
- 2013.7.11 - BESTie
- 2013.6.17 - Park Mu-jin
- 2013.5.7 - History
- 2013.4.29 - Yoo Ji-ae

==== Wonder Live ====
It is a mini-concert from an artist.

List of Wonder Live guests

2014

- 2014.1.28 - Zia Have You Ever Cried and three more songs
- 2014.1.16 - MC the Max Wind That Blows and three more songs

2013

- 2013.12.18 - Bumkey, Verbal Jint Only for You and three more songs
- 2013.11.21 - Park Ji-yoon Mr. Lee (featuring San E) and four more songs
- 2013.10.29 - K.Will You Don't Know Love, Lay Back, I'll Be with You and three more songs
- 2013.9.3 - Lyn I Like This Song, Song for Love and a short medley of five songs

=== Mini-Programs ===
==== History's ToryTory BangBang ====
Called a "short-com" (comedy short film), it starred the boy band History and premiered on June 6, 2013. It tackles about the group members' lives before their debut. It had five episodes and ended on July 4, 2013.

==== Fiestar's A-HA! For the Global K-pop Fan ====
It is an educational show featuring Fiestar's leader Jei, vocalist Cao Lu and lead rapper Cheska. It caters for international viewers who wants to learn the Korean language. The first video is released on July 26, 2013, with their main topic, "Daebak", with Jei speaking Korean, Cheska in English, and Cao Lu translating it in Chinese. The last video, "Kkuljaem", was uploaded on October 24, 2013.

List of Fiestar's A-HA! For the Global K-Pop Fan episodes
- 2013.7.26 - Daebak
- 2013.8.1 - Deuktem
- 2013.8.8 - Tteokbap
- 2013.8.15 - Jjal
- 2013.8.22 - Doljikgu
- 2013.8.29 - Anseup
- 2013.9.5 - Menbung
- 2013.9.12 - Real
- 2013.9.26 - Dotne
- 2013.10.3 - Bolmae
- 2013.10.10 - Cri
- 2013.10.17 - Gaenso
- 2013.10.24 - Kkuljaem

==== Oven Radio ====
It is a five-minute program resembled to a radio show, airing for five days.

It was supposed to start in October 2013 and to be hosted by Jung Joon-young, but was cancelled. It finally started the following month with Lee Juck as host.

List of Oven Radio episodes

EXO's Oven Radio

- 2013.12.9 - Episode 1 Miracles in December, Episode 2 Christmas Day
- 2013.12.10 - Episode 3 The Star
- 2013.12.11 - Episode 4 My Turn to Cry
- 2013.12.12 - Episode 5 The First Snow

Lee Juck's Oven Radio

- 2013.11.10 - Episode 1 Before Sunrise
- 2013.11.11 - Episode 2 20 Years After
- 2013.11.12 - Episode 3 What Do You See
- 2013.11.13 - Episode 4 Is There Anybody
- 2013.11.14 - Episode 5 Lie Lie Lie
