= IU videography =

List of music videos

IU video discography
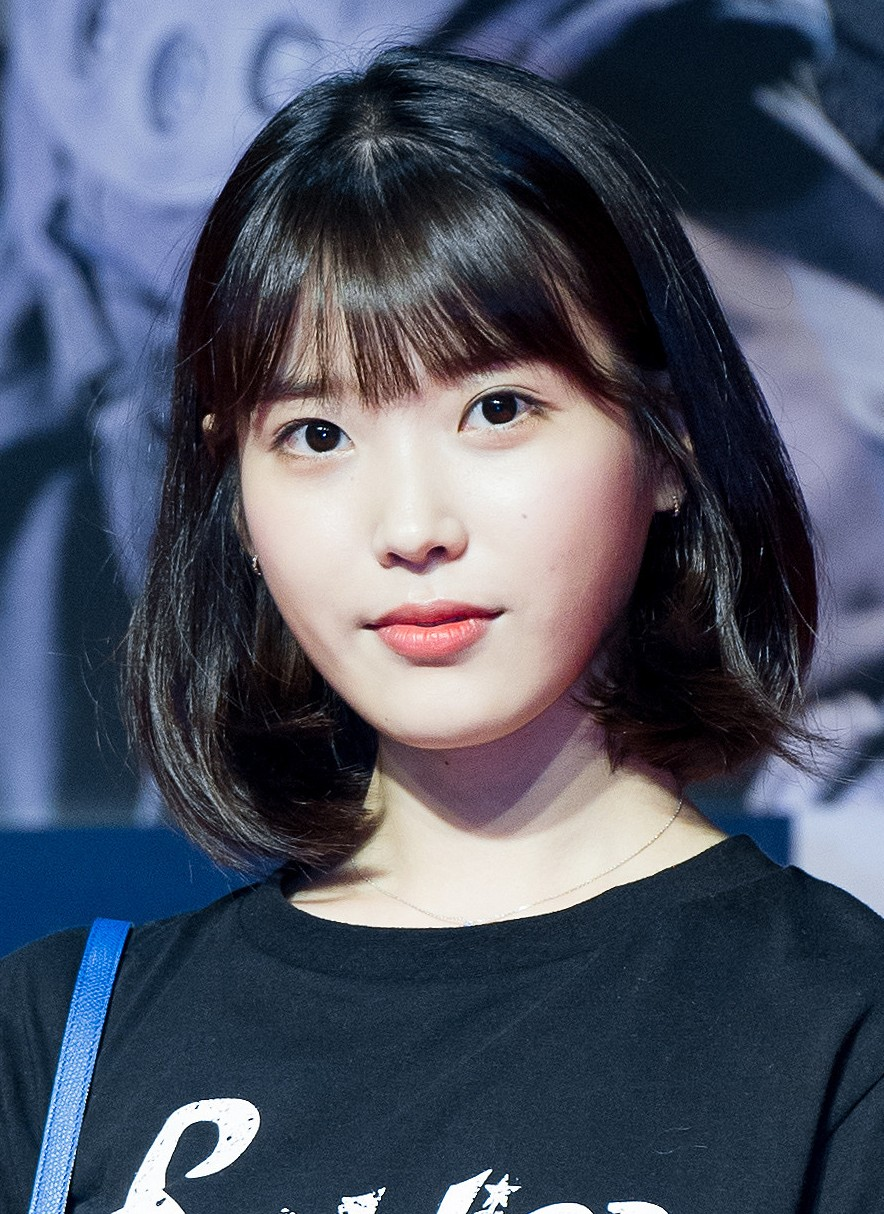
- IU at the premiere for Midnight Runners on August 7, 2017
- Music videos: 58
- Special clips: 14

South Korean musician IU has released more than 50 music videos since her debut in 2008, creating works for songs she has released as singles, as well as songs from her albums.

In addition to her music videos, she has released 14 special clips made of live performances of the songs.

== Music videos ==
=== As lead artist ===
Title	Year	Artist(s)	Director(s)	Notes
"Lost Child"	2008	IU	Cho Soo-hyun	Features Thunder
"Boo"	2009	IU	Oh Se-hoon	
"You Know (Rock version)"	2009	IU	Han Sang-beom	
"You Are Always Like That"	2009	IU	Unknown	
"Marshmallow"	2009	IU	Seo Sang-goon & Jung Jin-seong	
"Because I'm a Girl"	2010	IU	Unknown	For MBC's Road No. 1 OST
"Good Day"	2010	IU	Hwang Soo-ah	Features Jung Jae-hyung
"Only I Didn't Know"	2011	IU	Hwang Soo-ah	Features Park Bo-young and Yoon Sang
"Only I Didn't Know"	2011	IU	Hwang Soo-ah	IU version
"I Hoppin U"	2011	IU	Unknown	For Samsung Galaxy S CF
"Melody of the Wind"	2011	IU	Unknown	For Leafie, A Hen into the Wild OST
"Memories of the Sea"	2011	IU	Unknown	Expo 2012 Yeosu Korea theme song
"Hold My Hand"	2011	IU	Unknown	For MBC's The Greatest Love OST
"Let's Catch the Bus"	2011	IU	Unknown	For Hyundai's Bus Concert campaign
"You and I"	2011	IU	Hwang Soo-ah	Features Lee Hyun-woo
"You and I"	2011	IU	Hwang Soo-ah	Performance version
"Last Fantasy"	2012	IU	Kim Do-yeon	
"Good Day"	2012	IU	Hwang Soo-ah	Japanese version
"Every End of the Day"	2012	IU	Hwang Soo-ah	Documentary-like short film Also features a performance of the song "Peach"
"You and I"	2012	IU	Hwang Soo-ah	Japanese version
"Beautiful Dancer"	2013	IU	Hwang Soo-ah	Japanese; Features Song Kyung-il
"Monday Afternoon"	2013	IU	Digipedi	Japanese
"The Red Shoes"	2013	IU	Hwang Soo-ah	Features You Hee-yeol, Peppertones, Fhi Fan, and Jang Ki-yong
"The Red Shoes"	2013	IU	Hwang Soo-ah	Performance version
"Friday"	2013	IU featuring Jang Yi-jeong	Hwang Soo-ah	Features Jang Yi-jeong and Jang Ki-yong
"My Old Story"	2014	IU	Han Dae-hee	Features Choi Woo-shik
"Take Care of My Dad"	2015	IU	Unknown	SBS's Take Care of My Dad theme song
"Twenty-Three"	2015	IU	Lumpens	
"Through the Night"	2017	IU	BTS Film	
"Palette"	2017	IU featuring G-Dragon	BTS Film	
"Ending Scene"	2017	IU	Bae Doo-hyun	Features Kim Soo-hyun
"Last Night Story"	2017	IU	BTS Film	Starring Lim Hyun-jae of Hyukoh
"With the Heart to Forget You"	2018	IU	BTS Film	Features Park Jeong-min
"BBIBBI"	2018	IU	VM Project Architecture	
"Above the Time"	2019	IU	Hwang Soo-ah	Features Lee Hyun-woo
"Blueming"	2019	IU	Naive Creative Production	
"Eight"	2020	IU featuring Suga	Woogie Kim (MOTHER STUDIO)	
"Celebrity"	2021	IU	Paranoid Paradigm (VM Project Architecture)	
"Lilac"	2021	IU	Seo Donghyeok (FLIPEVIL)	Special Starring Jung Jae-hyung
"Coin"	2021	IU	SUNNYVISUAL	Features Kim Yoon-seok
"Strawberry Moon"	2021	IU	Seo Donghyeok (FLIPEVIL)	Features Lee Jong-won
"Love Wins All"	2024	IU	Um Tae-hwa	Features V of BTS
"Holssi"	2024	IU	Digipedi	Features Tweety of Looney Tunes
"Shopper"	2024	IU	DPR Ian	
"Shh.."	2024	IU featuring Hyein, Wonsun Joe and Special Narration by Patti Kim	Hwang Soo-ah	Features Tang Wei
"Never Ending Story"	2025	IU	Lee Rae-kyung	Features Heo Nam-jun
"A Beautiful Person"	2025	IU featuring Balming Tiger	Unknown	Features Cha Eun-woo
"Dear My Crazy Soulmate"	2026	IU		
"Unknown Planet"	2026	IU		

=== As featured artist ===
Title	Year	Artist(s)	Director(s)	Notes
"247"	2009	The Three Views featuring IU	Fanny	
"Nagging"	2010	IU and Lim Seul-ong	Hwang Soo-ah	For We Got Married's We Fell in Love 2
"Let's Go (English version)"	2010	Various artists	Unknown	2010 G20 Seoul summit theme song
"I Believe in Love"	2010	IU and Yoo Seung-ho	Unknown	For KBS's Love Request OST
"Ice Flower"	2011	IU and Yuna Kim	Unknown	SBS's Kiss & Cry theme song
"Sea of Moonlight"	2012	IU and Fiestar	Hwang Soo-ah	For LOEN Tree's summer project album, Summer Story
"Not Spring, Love, or Cherry Blossoms"	2014	High4 and IU	Unknown	
"Sogyeokdong"	2014	Seo Taiji and IU	Hwang Soo-ah	Features Sung Yu-bin and Kim Hyun-soo
"When Would It Be"	2014	Yoon Hyun-sang and IU	Digipedi	
"SoulMate"	2018	Zico and IU	Oui Kim (GDW)	
"Ganadara"	2022	Jay Park and IU	FLIPEVIL	

== Special clips ==
Title	Year	Artist(s)	Album
"The Meaning of You"	2014	IU featuring Kim Chang-wan	A Flower Bookmark
"The Shower"	2015	IU	Chat-Shire
"Knees"	2015	IU	Chat-Shire
"Zezé"	2015	IU	Chat-Shire
"Dear Name"	2017	IU	Palette
"Sleepless Rainy Night"	2017	IU	A Flower Bookmark 2
"Blueming"	2019	IU	Love Poem
"Eight"	2020	IU	Non-album single
"Love Poem"	2020	IU	Love Poem
"Above the Time"	2020	IU	Love Poem
"Celebrity"	2021	IU	Lilac
"Coin"	2021	IU	Lilac
"Next Stop"	2021	IU	Pieces
"Winter Sleep"	2021	IU	Pieces
