= USS Everett F. Larson =

USS Everett F. Larson has been the name of more than one United States Navy ship, and may refer to:

- USS Everett F. Larson (DE-554), a destroyer escort cancelled in 1944
- USS Everett F. Larson (DD-830), a destroyer in commission from 1945 to 1972
