= USS Everett F. Larson (DD-830) =

Gearing-class destroyer

Coordinates: 37.7176852°N 129.0053792°E

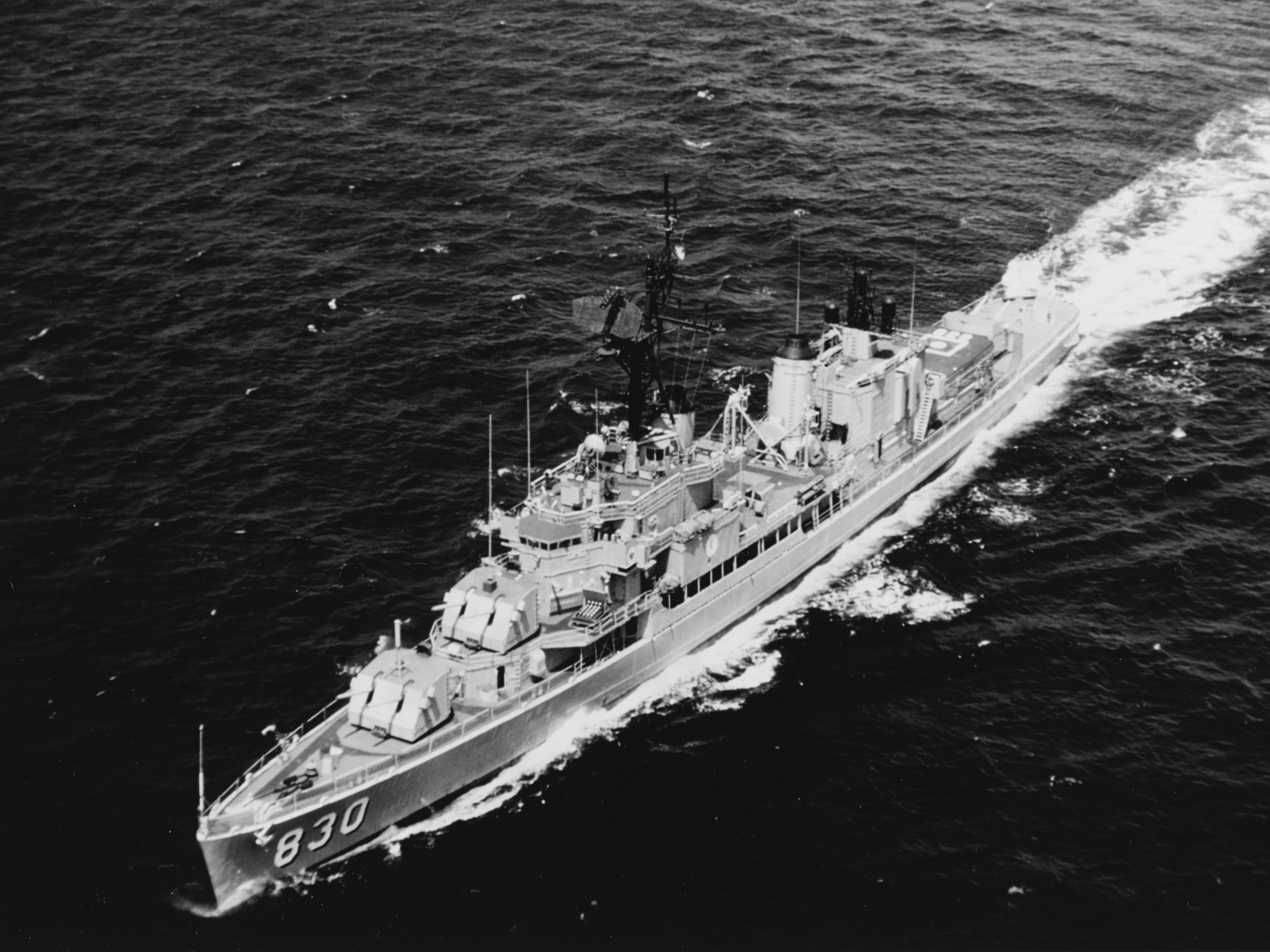
- USS Everett F. Larson underway on 16 April 1969

History

United States
- Name: Everett F. Larson
- Namesake: Everett F. Larson
- Builder: Bath Iron Works
- Laid down: 4 September 1944
- Launched: 28 January 1945
- Sponsored by: Mrs. H. Larson
- Commissioned: 6 April 1945
- Decommissioned: August 1972
- Reclassified: DDR-830, 18 March 1949
- Stricken: 2 June 1975
- Identification: Callsign: NKEZ; Hull number: DD-830
- Motto: Watch Dog of the Sea
- Fate: Transferred to South Korea, 30 October 1972
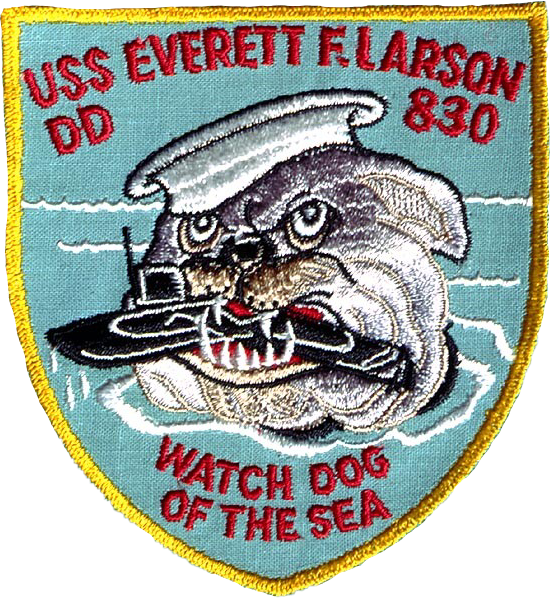
- Badge

South Korea
- Name: Jeongbuk; (전북)
- Namesake: Jeonbuk
- Acquired: 30 October 1972
- Decommissioned: December 1999
- Identification: Hull number: DD-916
- Fate: Scrapped, December 2021

General characteristics
- Class & type: Gearing-class destroyer; Chungbuk-class destroyer
- Displacement: 3,460 long tons (3,516 t) full
- Length: 390 ft 6 in (119.02 m)
- Beam: 40 ft 10 in (12.45 m)
- Draft: 14 ft 4 in (4.37 m)
- Propulsion: Geared turbines, 2 shafts, 60,000 shp (45 MW)
- Speed: 35 knots (65 km/h; 40 mph)
- Range: 4,500 nmi (8,300 km) at 20 kn (37 km/h; 23 mph)
- Complement: 336
- Armament: 6 × 5"/38 caliber guns; 12 × 40 mm AA guns; 11 × 20 mm AA guns; 10 × 21 inch (533 mm) torpedo tubes; 6 × depth charge projectors; 2 × depth charge tracks

USS Everett F. Larson (DD/DDR-830) was a Gearing-class destroyer of the United States Navy, named for Private First Class Everett F. Larson (1920–1942) who was killed in the Guadalcanal campaign.

== Namesake ==
Everett Frederick Larson was born on 3 September 1920 in Stamford, Connecticut. He enlisted in the United States Marine Corps Reserve on 13 January 1942. Serving in the Guadalcanal Campaign during World War II, Private First Class Larson was killed in action on Guadalcanal on 8 October 1942, while attempting to swim the Matanikau River under heavy Japanese fire to rescue a wounded comrade. He was posthumously awarded the Silver Star and shared in the Presidential Unit Citation awarded the 1st Marine Division for its actions on Guadalcanal. In 1943, the destroyer escort USS Everett F. Larson (DE-554) was named for him but its construction was cancelled in 1944.

== Construction and commissioning ==
Everett F. Larson was launched on 28 January 1945 by Bath Iron Works, Bath, Maine; sponsored by Mrs. H. Larson, mother of PFC Larson; and commissioned on 6 April 1945. She was reclassified DDR-830 on 18 March 1949.

== Service history ==
=== 1945–1960 ===
Everett F. Larson sailed from Boston, Massachusetts on 1 August 1945 for the Pacific, and on 29 September arrived at Tokyo Bay. During her lengthy occupation service, she participated in the landing of Marines at Taku, China, in October 1945, and in Operation "Road's End," the sinking of 24 captured Japanese submarines in April 1946. She put in San Diego, California, on 21 December, bound for Newport, Rhode Island, her assigned home port, where she arrived on 19 March 1947.

During her nine years with the Atlantic Fleet, Everett F. Larson completed seven tours of duty with the 6th Fleet in the Mediterranean, patrolling the Near East during the crisis over the Palestine partition and joining in NATO training cruises in 1948 and 1955, and participated in antisubmarine warfare activities off the east coast, as well as training in the Caribbean.

On 28 June 1956, Everett F. Larson arrived at Long Beach, California, her home port for duty in the Pacific Fleet. Operations off the coast of California, and north to Seattle, Washington, prepared her for deployments to the Far East in 1957, 1958, 1959, and 1960. During these she served on patrol duty off Taiwan, exercised off Okinawa and in the Philippines, and acted as escort and plane guard for the aircraft carriers of Task Force 77 (TF 77). Outward bound for her 1958 tour, she called at Pago Pago, American Samoa, and Auckland, New Zealand.

Everett F. Larson's last eastern Pacific operation prior to her 1960 deployment to the western Pacific was as a unit of the U.S. 1st Fleet passing in review in the annual "Great White Fleet Review", in September 1960, in San Francisco Bay.

=== 1960–1972 ===
In June, 1962, the ship entered Long Beach Naval Shipyard for an extensive overhaul under the Navy's FRAM MkII program. In line with Larson's new capabilities, the ship's primary mission was changed from a Radar Picket Destroyer to a modern anti-submarine fighting ship. Thus, DDR-830 with its 3"/50 guns and SPS 6 and SPS 8 radars passed into history and DD-830, an anti-submarine configured destroyer joined the fleet on 30 December 1962.

In April, 1963, Everett F. Larson was transferred from DESRON 19 to DESRON 23 which had made a name for itself during World War II under the command of Admiral Arleigh Burke when it first took the name of "the Little Beavers". Everett F. Larson was assigned to DESDIV 231

On 27 August 1965, Everett F. Larson fired her guns at an enemy for the first time since World War II, firing over 300 rounds of 5"/38 caliber ammunition into North Vietnam conducting shore bombardment operations. The ship remained on the "gun line" until early September conducting underway replenishments of fuel from Bennington (CV-20) and Hassayampa (AO-145), stores from Pictor (AF-54) and Pollux (AKS-4), and ammunition from Paricutin (AE-18) between gun shoots and occasional plane guard duties behind one of the three to four attack carriers operating in the vicinity.

On 27 February 1966, Larson left Long Beach Naval Shipyard, after completing a regularly scheduled overhaul, which commenced in November 1965. She conducted local operations until 12 March when she began refresher training at San Diego, California. Refresher training was completed on 22 April 1966 and Larson immediately began a HUKASWEX (Hunter Killer Anti-Submarine Exercise) with ASWGRU (Anti-Submarine Group) FIVE. At the completion of this exercise, Larson conducted local operations in preparation for deployment to WESTPAC (Western Pacific).

On 9 June 1966, Larson deployed to WESTPAC with ASWGRU FIVE. The pre-deployment ORE (Operational Readiness Evaluation) was conducted in the Hawaiian operations area with units of ASWGRU FIVE, including Kearsarge (CV-33) Destroyer Division (DESDIV 252), Carrier Anti-Submarine Group 53 (CVSG 53). Additionally, time was spent in Pearl Harbor preparing for the long at-sea periods ahead. Finally on 5 July, Larson got underway for Yokosuka, Japan, arriving there on 14 July 1966.

The Sea of Japan transit began 20 July as Larson left Yokosuka; during the transit exercises were conducted with the Japan Maritime Self-Defense Force until 28 July; then with Republic of Korea Navy until 1 August. On 2 August, Larson pulled into Sasebo, Japan, and left 8 August with ASWGRU FIVE for duty on "Yankee Station". After a short period on "Yankee Station", Larson spent alternate periods on patrol and in port at Kaohsiung and Keelung, Taiwan, until 15 September when she left Kaohsiung as a typhoon came roaring in and headed back to "Yankee Station". As soon as she arrived, she was ordered to participate in operation "Silver Skate" and did so from 22 to 27 September. At the completion of this exercise, Larson was ordered to gunfire support activities in South Vietnam. On 1 October, Larson pulled into Da Nang Harbor and began the gunfire support activities, which would last until 6 October. During this period, Larson fired 656 rounds of five-inch 38-caliber ammunition, and killed or wounded 63 Viet Cong soldiers. In addition, she also destroyed 62 structures, and numerous roads and trenches.

Upon completion of gunfire support, Larson was detached and ordered to Subic Bay, Philippines for a week of up-keep and repair. After this period, Larson returned to "Yankee Station" and operated with other units of the 7th Fleet until she was detached for nearly a week of R and R in Hong Kong, beginning 30 October 1966.

On 5 November, Larson arrived in Kaohsiung to resume duties on Taiwan patrol. She patrolled uneventfully until she was detached 1 December to proceed for Yokosuka, Japan. Larson was at Yokosuka from 5 to 9 December, and then proceeded for the States with the rest of ASWGRU FIVE; chopped from the Seventh Fleet to the First Fleet on 12 December. 20 December 1966 marked homecoming for the men of Larson. For the rest of the year, holiday routine was standard operating procedure.

Having been deployed to WESTPAC since August 1967. The first quarter of 1968 found the Larson on "Yankee Station", plane guarding and serving from 6 to 10 January as ASW training area coordinator. Hong Kong was a port stop from 15 to 21 January with a passage on 21 January to Kaohsiung, Taiwan. After five days in Kaohsiung, Larson was ordered to the Sea of Japan, arriving with the first U.S. units there after USS Pueblo's capture. Larson was the first DESRON 23 ship assigned to TF 71 for this operation, remaining from 31 January to 2 March 1968 as part of Operation Formation Star.

The 2-12 period in March was spent in port in Sasebo for upkeep, then a return to the Sea of Japan from 13 to 21 March. While in the Sea of Japan. Larson plane guarded and served as surface action unit with Canberra (CA-70) once again in port in Sasebo, Japan, 22–23 March, Larson readied to leave WESTPAC for the return home.

Transit from Sasebo to Long Beach took from 24 March to 6 April. Larson arrived in Long Beach on her twenty-third birthday, 6 April 1968. From 6 April for the rest of the year, Larson spent most of her time in port or in the Southern California operations areas, providing services for other units and in type training.

From 19 May to 8 June found Larson in Long Beach shipyard for repairs to her hull. Larson participated in HOLDEX 4-68 from 23 June to 1 July. On 24 July, Larson tested the MK 46 towed target and became the first towed vessel to successfully launch tube and Dash launched torpedoes on target.

Primary mission during the year was training for and conducting ASW operations as part of ASW Group One (ASWGRU ONE). Component Units included the Kearsarge (CV-33), Walke (DD-723), Frank E. Evans (DD-754), James E. Kyes (DD-787), USS Everett F. Larson (DD-830), Schofield (DEG-3), and Bronstein (FF-1037).

In March 1969 the ship departed Long Beach in company with other units of DESDIV 231 which included the destroyers James E. Kyes with COMDESDIV 231 aboard, Frank E. Evans, and Walke en route WEST PAC via Hawaii.

During her Far East deployments she served on patrol duty off Taiwan (Formosa), exercised off Okinawa, Philippines and was one of the first ships to conduct shore bombardment operations against North Vietnam, she also provide fire support missions off South Vietnam, and acted as escort and plane guard for the carriers of TF 77.

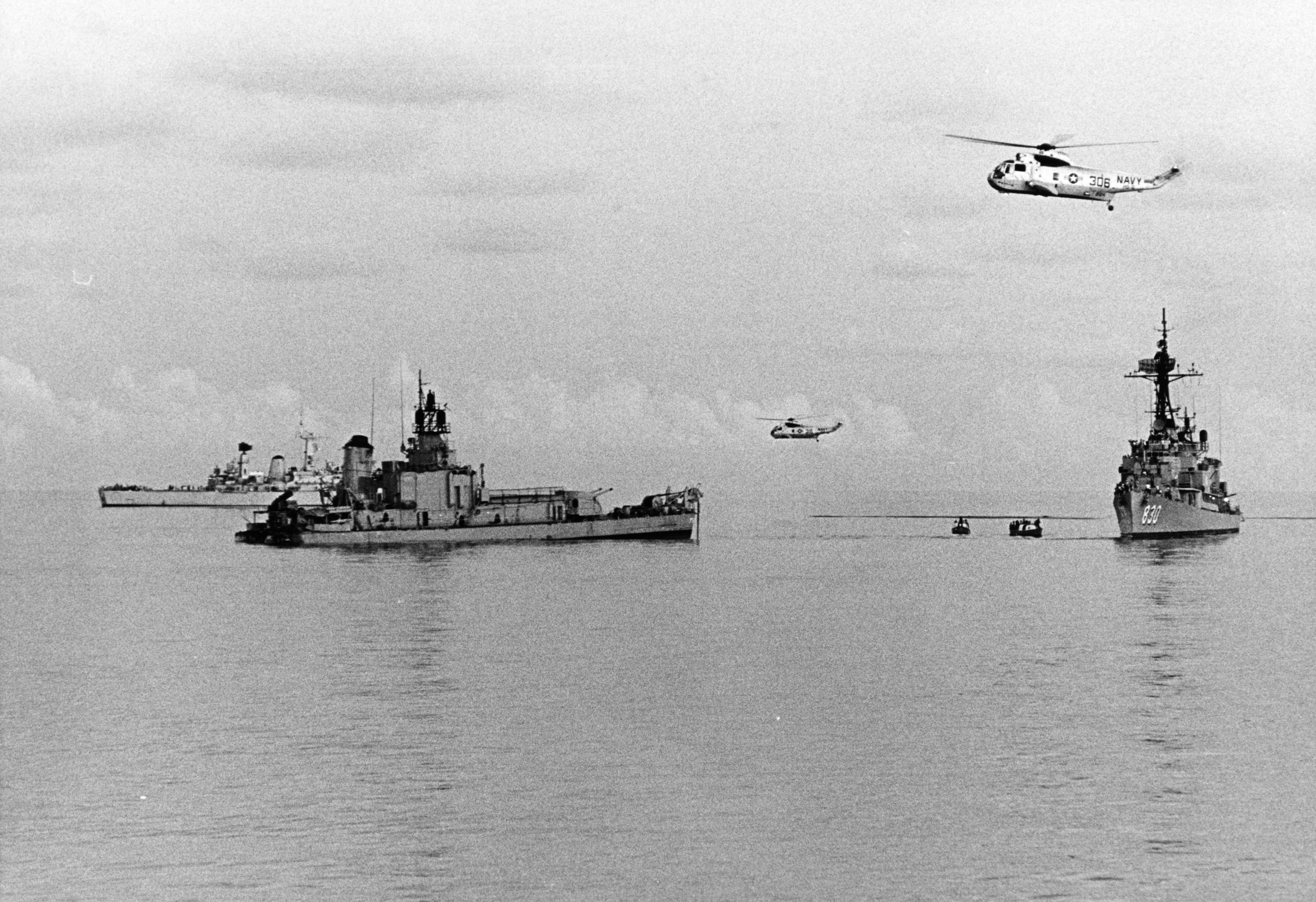
The stern section of USS Frank E. Evans on the morning after the Melbourne-Evans collision. USS Everett F. Larson (right) is moving in to salvage the remains of the abandoned destroyer.

In late May 1969, Larson was one of several U.S. ships deployed to Southeast Asia Treaty Organization (SEATO) Exercise Sea Spirit. She was part of a multi-national five-destroyer screen for the Australian aircraft carrier HMAS Melbourne during the war games. Despite being informed of the collision Melbourne had been involved in five years earlier, and of the operating conditions demanded by the Australian admiral commanding the group of ships, Larson was nearly involved in a collision with Melbourne during the early hours of 31 May. The destroyer had put herself in danger while assuming the plane guard station, and only quick thinking on the parts of both warships' crews prevented a collision. Three nights later, Frank E. Evans (DD-754), also a part of Melbourne's screen, was rammed and sunk by the carrier with the loss of 74 U.S. sailors. Larson was involved in the salvaging of Evans' stern section after the collision.

The Everett F. Larson continued to operate with the 7th Fleet throughout the sixties and early seventies. She was decommissioned in August 1972 and transferred to the Korean Navy.

=== ROKS Jeon Buk (DD-916) ===
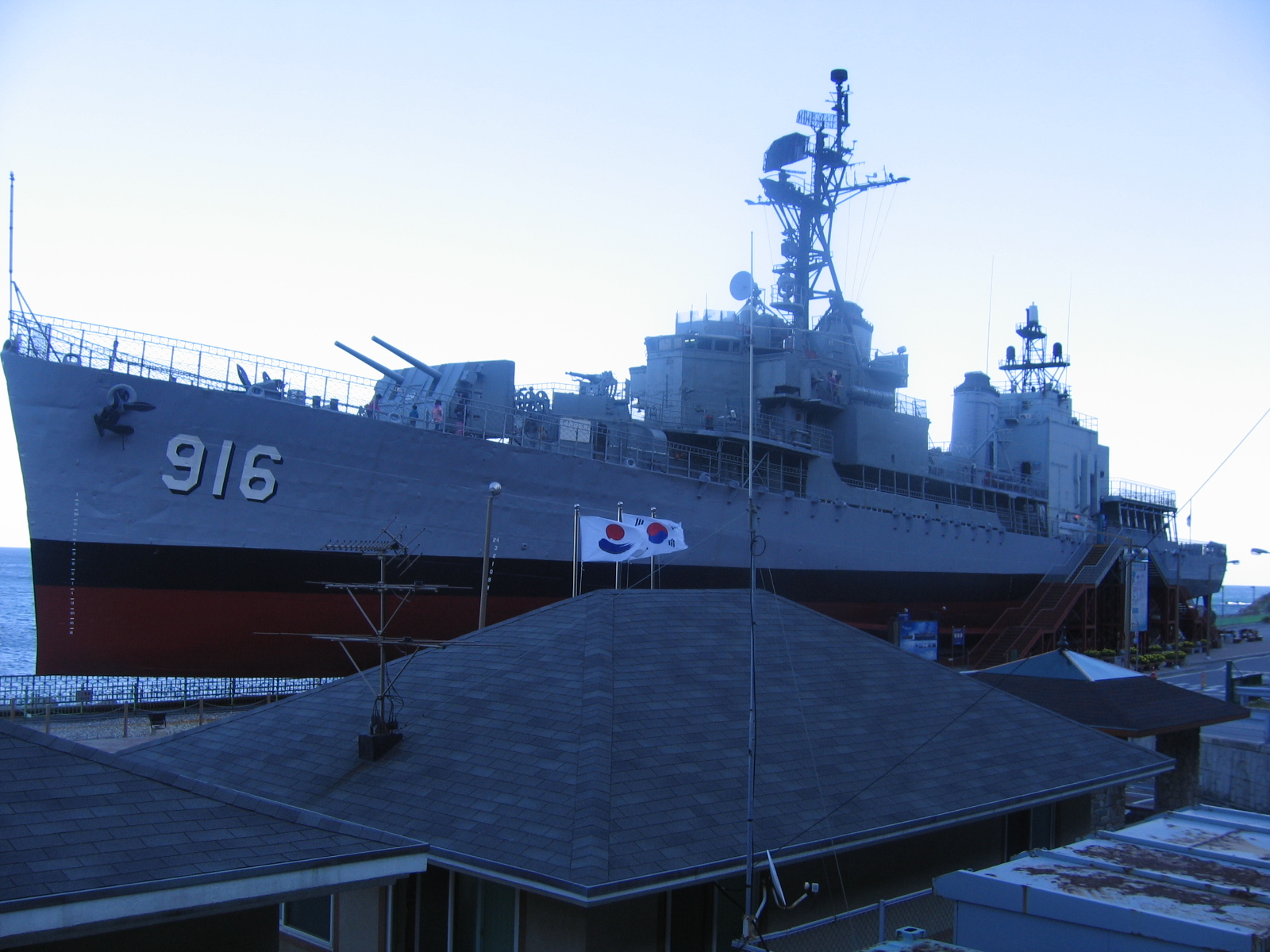
ROKS Jeonbuk (DD-916) as a museum ship in Gangneung, South Korea

Everett F. Larson was transferred to South Korea on 30 October 1972. She served in the Republic of Korea Navy as ROKS Jeonbuk (DD-916).

in 2018, the ship was used to film the psychological thriller movie Human, Space, Time and Human.

She was decommissioned by Korea in December 1999, and became a museum ship at Gangneung Unification Park, Gangneung, South Korea. By 2021, the city was spending $264,500 annually to maintain the aging structure of the 76 year-old ship. Facing rising costs and decreased tourism (due in part to the COVID-19 pandemic), she was returned to the Korean navy and dismantled in December 2021.
