= Black Label (Fiestar EP) =

EP by Fiestar
- Released: March 4, 2015
- Recorded: Seoul, South Korea; 2015
- Genres: K-pop, dance-pop, electro hop
- Label: LOEN Entertainment

Fiestar chronology
Black Label (2015)	A Delicate Sense (2016)

Singles from Black Label
- 1. "So Tight" Released: October 30, 2014; 2. "You're Pitiful" Released: March 4, 2015

Black Label is the first extended play by South Korean girl group Fiestar. The album was released digitally and physically on March 4, 2015. The album contains six tracks with the lead single, "You're Pitiful".

== Background and release ==
In February 2015, LOEN Entertainment launched the band's official that the group would debut with the mini-album "Black Label" and title-track "You're Pitiful". The track is described as a 'ballad' track with elements of dream, and dance.

The first teaser was posted on February 25, 2015. Second teaser was posted on March 1, 2015. On March 4, the song's music video were released online. The group also released a dance practice on March 9, 2015. Special "Performance Version" was released on March 11, 2015.

== Promotion ==
Fiestar held a live showcase on March 4, where they performed "You're Pitiful" along with other tracks.

The group started promoting their title track "You're Pitiful" on music shows on March 4. They first performed the songs on Mnet's M! Countdown, followed by performances on KBS' Music Bank, MBC's Show! Music Core and SBS's Inkigayo.

== Track listing ==
No.	Title	Lyrics	Music	Arrangement	Length
1.	"You're Pitiful" (짠해)	Shinsadong Tiger, Cleanup Hitter, LE, Yezi	Shinsadong Tiger, Cleanup Hitter	Shinsadong Tiger	3:52
2.	"Hello"	Yezi, Cleanup Hitter	Cleanup Hitter	Cleanup Hitter	3:22
3.	"Turn Off The Lights" (볼 좀 꺼줘요)	Yezi, Zuwan	Youm Dongkun, Zuwan	Youm Dongkun, Zuwan	3:22
4.	"Cold"	Hyemi, Yezi, Cheongdam Super	Cheongdam Super, Hyemi, Seo Jieun	Cheongdam Super, Seo Jieun	3:19
5.	"Today"	Linzy	Linzy	Linzy, Kim Jongsu, Lee Jincheol	3:14
6.	"So Tight" (타이트해)	Shinsadong Tiger, Bum I, Nam I	Shinsadong Tiger, Bum I, Nam I	Shinsadong Tiger	3:31
