= Woo Ki-hoon =

South Korean actor

- Born: Woo Ki-hoon; 30 December 1996 (age 29); South Korea
- Other names: Woo Gi-hoon, Woo Ki-hun, Woo Gi-hun
- Occupations: Actor; model
- Years active: 2014–present
- Agent: Big Whale Entertainment
- Known for: Second 20s Solomon's Perjury; The Missing

Woo Ki-hoon (born 1996) is a South Korean actor and model. He is best known for his drama roles in Solomon's Perjury, Second 20s and The Missing.

== Filmography ==
=== Television series ===
Year	Title	Role	Ref.
2014	Your Heart	Gi-hui	
2015	Second 20s	Woo-hun	
2015	The Missing	Kim Min-jung	
2016-2017	Solomon's Perjury	Kim Min-seok	
2018	KBS Drama Special: "So Close, Yet So Far"	Hong Ki-joon	
2018	Cross	Lee-dong	
2018	The Ghost Detective	Pil-seung	
2018	Twelve Nights	Yoo Shik-eun	

=== Film ===
Year	Title	Role	Language	Ref.
2017	Human, Space, Time and Human	Ki-seok	Korean	
