= The Missing (South Korean TV series) =

2015 South Korean television series

- Promotional poster
- Hangul: 실종느와르 M
- Hanja: 失踪느와르 M
- RR: Siljong neuwareu M
- MR: Silchong nŭwarŭ M
- Genre: Police procedural Thriller; Mystery; Action
- Written by: Lee Yoo-jin
- Directed by: Lee Seung-young
- Starring: Kim Kang-woo; Park Hee-soon
- Composer: Roh Hyung-woo
- Country of origin: South Korea
- Original language: Korean
- No. of episodes: 10

Production
- Executive producers: Baek Ho-min; Park Ho-shik
- Producers: Park Ji-young; Park Seon-jin; Kim Geun-hong; Jung Se-ryeong
- Production location: South Korea
- Cinematography: Jeon Byung-moon
- Editor: Nam In-joo
- Running time: 65 minutes
- Production companies: CJ E&M; MBC C&I

Original release
- Network: OCN
- Release: March 28 – May 30, 2015

The Missing (Korean: 실종느와르 M; lit. 'Missing Noir M') is a 2015 South Korean television series starring Kim Kang-woo and Park Hee-soon. It aired on OCN on Saturdays at 23:00 for 10 episodes from March 28 to May 30, 2015.

== Plot ==
Gil Soo-hyun is a genius who entered Harvard University at the age of ten. After working for the FBI for a decade, he mysteriously decides to return to Korea, where he gets assigned to lead a special missing persons task force that goes after the 1% toughest unsolved cases.

He becomes partner of Oh Dae-young, a detective with a lot of years of experience in the field and a strong sense of justice. Whereas Soo-hyun is overly analytical, Dae-young goes with his gut feeling. These two characteristics are combined in this series and with their will to serve justice, they book in prison a lot of violent criminals.

== Cast ==
=== Main ===
- Kim Kang-woo as Gil Soo-hyun
- Park Hee-soon as Oh Dae-young
- Jo Bo-ah as Jin Seo-joon
- Kim Kyu-chul as Park Jung-do
- Park So-hyun as Kang Joo-young

=== Supporting ===
- Woo Ki-hoon as Kim Min-jung
- Yoo Jung-ho
- Jo Yeon-hee as Shin Ji-sub's wife
- Im Jae-min
- Park Gun-rak
- Yoo Soon-chul
- Lee Seok-gu
- Sung In-ja
- Gong Ho-seok
- Jang Joon-ho
- Ji Sung-geun
- Han Seo-jin as Lee So-yoon
- Kim Byung-chul as Kang Yoon-goo

=== Guest appearances ===
- Kang Ha-neul as Lee Jung-soo (ep 1-2)
- Go Bo-gyeol as Kang Soon-young (ep 1-2)
- Jung Woo-sik as Kang Min-chul/Joseph Joo (ep 2)
- Ryu Tae-ho as Kim Seok-gyu (ep 2)
- Lee Seung-hyung as Kim Seok-jin (ep 2)
- Kim Nam-hee as Jailor (ep 2)
- Park Hae-joon as Ha Tae-jo (ep 3-4)
- Son Jong-hak as Ryu Jung-gook (ep 3-4)
- Kim Byung-chul as Kang Yoon-goo (ep 6)
- L.Joe as Yang Jeong-ho (ep 7)
- Dean Dawson as The Man (ep 10)

== Ratings ==
Episode	Original air date	Title	AGB Average rating (Nationwide)
01	March 28, 2015	A Puzzle from Prison Part 1	3.014%
02	April 4, 2015	A Puzzle from Prison Part 2	1.445%
03	April 11, 2015	Rust Part 1 – Highway Missing Person Case	1.101%
04	April 18, 2015	Rust Part 2 – Justice	1.585%
05	April 25, 2015	Murder Reconstruction	1.816%
06	May 2, 2015	Murder Premonition	1.247%
07	May 9, 2015	Home	1.303%
08	May 16, 2015	Pure Heart Part 1	1.177%
09	May 23, 2015	Pure Heart Part 2	1.039%
10	May 30, 2015	Injustice	0.867%
