= Andante (TV series) =

2017 South Korean television series

- Promotional poster
- Hangul: 안단테
- RR: Andante
- MR: Andant'e
- Genre: Coming-of-age; Teen drama; Romance
- Developed by: KBS Drama Production
- Written by: Park Sun-ja; Kwon Ki-kyung
- Directed by: Park Ki-ho
- Starring: Kim Jong-in; Baek Chul-min; Lee Ye-hyun; Kim Jin-kyung
- Country of origin: South Korea
- Original language: Korean
- No. of episodes: 16

Production
- Executive producers: Park Ki-ho; Choi Wook; Jung Si-sun; Choi Hyun-mook
- Producers: Sung Joon-hae; Kim Jung-gon
- Running time: 55 minutes
- Production companies: UBICULTURE; ZIO Films; J1 Communication

Original release
- Network: KBS1
- Release: September 24, 2017 – January 7, 2018

Andante (Korean: 안단테; RR: Andante) is a 2017 South Korean television series starring Kim Jong-in, Baek Chul-min, Lee Ye-hyun, and Kim Jin-kyung. It aired on KBS1 from September 24, 2017 to January 7, 2018, every Sunday at 10:10 (KST).

== Synopsis ==
A high school student named Lee Shi-kyung (Kai) moves to the countryside with his family and discovers a real-life ecosystem.

== Cast ==
=== Main ===
- Kim Jong-in as Lee Shi-kyung

An antisocial high school student who is a VVIP at his nearest PC room.

- Go On as Park Ga-ram

An elite student with a warm temperament and dreams of becoming a doctor.

- Lee Ye-hyun as Lee Shi-young

Shi-Kyung's younger sister has a prickly personality and is a cosplay otaku.

- Kim Jin-kyung as Kim Bom

A mysterious student, who has a cool-girl aura and is so shy to approach her fellow students.

=== Supporting ===
==== Shi-kyung and Shi-young's family ====
- Jeon Mi-seon as Oh Jung-won, Shi-kyung's mother
- Sung Byung-sook as Kim Duk-boon, Shi-kyung's grandmother
- Park Ji-yeon as Oh Jung-soo, Shi-kyung's aunt

==== People at the Hospital ====
- Kim Kwang-sik as Park Young-geun
- Kim Joo-ryoung as Young-sook
- Lee Chang-joo as Yum Chang-hoon
- Jeon Jin-gi as patient Kim Jae-woong

==== School Staff ====
- Kwon Nam-hee as Do Kyung-ja
- Ahn Hong-jin as Choi Jong-min
- Jay Kim as Kang Hyun-woo

==== Students ====
- Song Ji-hyun as Suk Joo-yeon

The class president who has a forceful, direct personality and strong leadership skills but becomes a tongue-tied and bashful in front of the boy she likes.

- Kim Ki-soo as Eom Yong-gi

A troubled school rebel who is threatened by Shi-kyung's arrival and views him as a rival.

- Ahn Seung-gyun as Min Ki-hoon

A cheerful student who has an insatiable curiosity about people and the talkative school gossip.

- Baek Eun-kyung as Kim Ji-hye

A sweet ordinary girl without any special dreams until she meets Shi-young and learns how to ponder her future goals.

- Kim Jung-ho as Kim Min-seok

=== Others ===
- Shin Cheol-jin as Han-young
- Lee Jin-kwon
- Jang Ki-hyun
- Kim Hyung-joo
- Lee Sang-yi as Sung Joon
- Son Jin-hwan
- Lee Chae-min as Do-young
- Yoo Hae-byul
- Jo Han-sol
- Son Soo-min
- Baek Seung-do
- Lee Jin-kwon
- Keum Bo as Myung-soo
- Gong Yoon-chan as Jae-hoon
- Kim Do-joon
- Kim Mo-bum
- Kim Dae-han
- Jung Kang-hee

=== Special appearances ===
- Lee Byung-joon

== Production ==
- Jung Da-bin was first offered the female lead role, but declined due to her schedule.
- First script reading took place January 13, 2017 at KBS Annex Broadcasting Station in Yeouido, Seoul, South Korea.
- Filming began on January 18, 2017, and ended on March 30.
- Filming mostly take place in Yeoju, including filming at Yeogang High School.

== Original soundtrack ==
Andante OST Album

Soundtrack album by Various Artists
- Released: December 23, 2017
- Genre: soundtrack
- Languages: Korean, English
- Labels: Music & New; Snow Entertainment; Windmill Entertainment

=== Part 1 ===
No.	Title	Lyrics	Music	Artist	Length
1.	"Since I Met You" (그댈 만난 이후로)	Tom and Jerry; Hani	Tom and Jerry	Huh Gak	4:17
2.	"Since I Met You" (Inst.)		Tom and Jerry		4:17
Total length:					8:34

=== Part 2 ===
No.	Title	Lyrics	Music	Artist	Length
1.	"Lovely Gift" (선물 같은 그대)	Kwon Hee-jin; C.Park	The Night of Seokyo	The Night of Seokyo	3:24
2.	"Lovely Gift" (Inst.)		The Night of Seokyo		3:24
Total length:					6:48

=== Part 3 ===
No.	Title	Lyrics	Music	Artists	Length
1.	"You Are in My Heart" (넌 내 안에)	ROZ; Emotion is; Bens Family	ROZ; Emotion is	Standing Egg	3:11
2.	"You Are in My Heart" (Inst.)		ROZ; Emotion is		3:11
Total length:					6:22

=== Part 4 ===
No.	Title	Lyrics	Music	Artist	Length
1.	"Everyday" (매일)	ZigZagNote; Lee Shin-sung	ZigZagNote; Noh Eun-jong	Jung Joon-young	4:07
2.	"Everyday" (Inst.)		ZigZagNote; Noh Eun-jong		4:07
Total length:					8:14

=== Part 5 ===
No.	Title	Lyrics	Music	Artist	Length
1.	"Someday" (언젠가 우연히)	Hana	IMFACT	Imfact	4:17
2.	"Someday" (Inst.)		IMFACT		4:17
Total length:					8:34

=== Part 6 ===
No.	Title	Lyrics	Music	Artist	Length
1.	"Sunshine"	Hana; Tom and Jerry	Tom and Jerry	Kim E-ji (Ggotjam Project)	4:01
2.	"Sunshine" (Inst.)		Tom and Jerry		4:01
Total length:					8:02

== Ratings ==
- In the table below, the blue numbers represent the lowest ratings and the red numbers represent the highest ratings.

Ep.	Original broadcast date	Title	Average audience share (Nationwide)	
Ep.	Original broadcast date	Title	TNmS Ratings	AGB Nielsen
1	September 24, 2017	First Death (첫번째 죽음)	2.9%	2.8%
2	October 1, 2017	Birth of Bernard (버나드의 탄생)	1.8%	2.0%
3	October 8, 2017	It Bothers Me That Much (신경 쓰여서. 그렇게)	2.3%	2.3%
4	October 15, 2017	Scenes of Grandma (할머니가 있는 풍경)	2.1%	2.4%
5	October 22, 2017	What Should I Say (무슨 말을 할까)	1.8%	1.8%
6	October 29, 2017	30,912 Hours, 14 Years, 10 Months, 10 Days (삼만구백십이시간, 십사년, 십개월, 십일)	2.2%	1.7%
7	November 5, 2017	Two Rings (두개의 반지)	2.1%	1.7%
8	November 12, 2017	Invitation to Daily Life (일상으로의 초대)	1.9%	1.9%
9	November 19, 2017	You Are My Spring (너는 나의 봄이다)	2.4%	2.1%
10	November 26, 2017	Memories of That Warm Winter (그 겨울 따뜻한 기억)	1.4%	1.6%
11	December 3, 2017	Fake or Real... What's Important is the Heart (진짜와 가짜... 중요한 건 마음이야)	2.3%	2.1%
12	December 10, 2017	Discovery of Family (가족의 발견)	2.3%	1.9%
13	December 17, 2017	You Can Choose to Stop Caring, but You Can't Choose to Stop Loving (정을 끊어도 사랑은 끊어지지 않는다)	1.8%	2.1%
14	December 24, 2017	The Show Must Go On!	2.1%	2.1%
15	December 31, 2017	Bom's Miracle (봄의 기적)	1.9%	1.7%
16	January 7, 2018	Father Is Back (아버지가 돌아왔다)	2.4%	1.8%
Average			2.00%	2.11%

== International broadcast ==
- According to KBS World, "Andante" has been contracted to all countries in Asia, excluding China, and Europe. The countries will be able to watch the series at the same time as its broadcast.
  - 24/09/2017 - Malaysia (Every Sunday - 6.30 p.m.). - Thailand (Every Weekends - 9.45 a.m.).
- Andante will air in Japan on KNTV starting from March 10, 2019.
