= Familyhood =

- Directed by: Kim Tae-gon
- Written by: Shin Dong-sun; Kim Tae-gon; Jeon Go-woon
- Produced by: Lee Jung-eun; Choi Won-ki
- Starring: Kim Hye-soo; Ma Dong-seok; Kim Hyun-soo; Kim Yong-gun; Seo Hyun-jin; Kwak Si-yang
- Cinematography: Lee Chang-jae
- Edited by: Shin Min-gyeong
- Music by: Kim Tae-seong
- Production companies: HODU&U Entertainment; Film Company RAM
- Distributed by: Showbox/Mediaplex
- Release date: June 29, 2016
- Running time: 120 minutes
- Country: South Korea
- Language: Korean
- Box office: US$15 million

Familyhood (Korean: 굿바이 싱글; RR: Gutbai singgeul; lit. 'Goodbye Single') is a 2016 South Korean comedy-drama film directed by Kim Tae-gon, starring Kim Hye-soo.

== Plot ==
Go Joo-yeon (Kim Hye-soo) is a self-centered star actress who has always gotten what she wants: fame, money, and even good-looking young boyfriends. However, now in her 40s and with her acting career going downhill, she wonders whether she should settle down with her secret boyfriend, who is 12 years younger than her. However, the boyfriend, a rookie actor, is only interested in taking advantage of her fame, cheating on her behind her back. Discovering the truth, Joo-yeon is devastated that she has no one who she can truly rely on. So she decides to have someone definite in her life, her own baby.

She goes to see an obstetrician only to learn that she has reached menopause. While facing the depressing truth, she comes across a pregnant teenager Kim Dan-ji (Kim Hyun-soo) at the hospital. Joo-yeon makes the offer to Dan-ji that she will adopt the baby at whatever price, and will support her until she delivers. Dan-ji, who needs the money, accepts the offer and agrees to stay hidden at Joo-yeon's home. When Joo-yeon makes a press announcement of her pregnancy, in vengeance against her ex-boyfriend, who has become a rising star, rumors start to spread about who the father is. She declares that she will be a single mom and her dignified demeanor earns her numerous jobs making her more successful than ever. Dazzled by the new phase in her career, Joo-yeon begins to neglect Dan-ji, but worse, people are now getting suspicious.

Dan-ji's sister and her boyfriend gets hold of Dan-ji's situation and extorts some money from Joo-yeon and flee to Australia leaving Dan-ji in an orphanage. Dan-ji plans on putting the baby up for adoption. Joo-yeon comes to know of this and meets Dan-ji and takes her to the art competition missing her press conference meant for apologizing for the false publicity of her pregnancy. Dan-ji gives birth to a baby and lives with Joo-yeon. The film ends with all the people sitting down for dinner in Joo-yeon's house.

== Cast ==
=== Main ===
- Kim Hye-soo as Go Joo-yeon
- Ma Dong-seok as Park Pyung-goo

=== Supporting ===
- Kim Hyun-soo as Kim Dan-ji
- Kim Yong-gun as CEO Kim
- Seo Hyun-jin as Sang-mi
- Kwak Si-yang as Kang Ji-hoon
- Hwang Mi-young as Mi-rae
- Kim Bo-yoon as Ok Hee
- Choi Go as Pyung-goo's child
- Ahn Jae-hong as Han Deok-soo
- Kang Chan-hee as Hyun-bin
- Jung Yeon-joo as Broadcasting station celebrity
- Lee Soo-kyung as Seon-yeong

=== Cameo ===
- Lee Sung-min as Joo Min-ho
- Kim Hee-chul as Broadcasting Station Idol
- Hwang Seung-eon as Award Ceremony Woman
- Ryu Hye-rin as Joo-yun's entertainment company's trainee

== Box office ==
Familyhood debuted on top of the Korean box office, opening in first place with 652,894 viewers (USD 4.83 million) over the weekend and 908,949 admissions (USD 6.36 million) over its first five days. It reached 1 million admissions on its first week. The film reached its breakeven point and has accumulated a total of 2,108,130 admissions.

== Awards and nominations ==
Year	Award	Category	Recipient	Result
2016	25th Buil Film Awards	Best Actress	Kim Hye-soo	Nominated
2016	25th Buil Film Awards	Best Supporting Actor	Ma Dong-seok	Nominated
2016	37th Blue Dragon Film Awards	Best Leading Actress	Kim Hye-soo	Nominated
2016	37th Blue Dragon Film Awards	Best New Director	Kim Tae-gon	Nominated
2017	53rd Baeksang Arts Awards	Best Actress	Kim Hye-soo	Nominated
