= History (band) =

2013–2017 South Korean boy band

History 히스토리
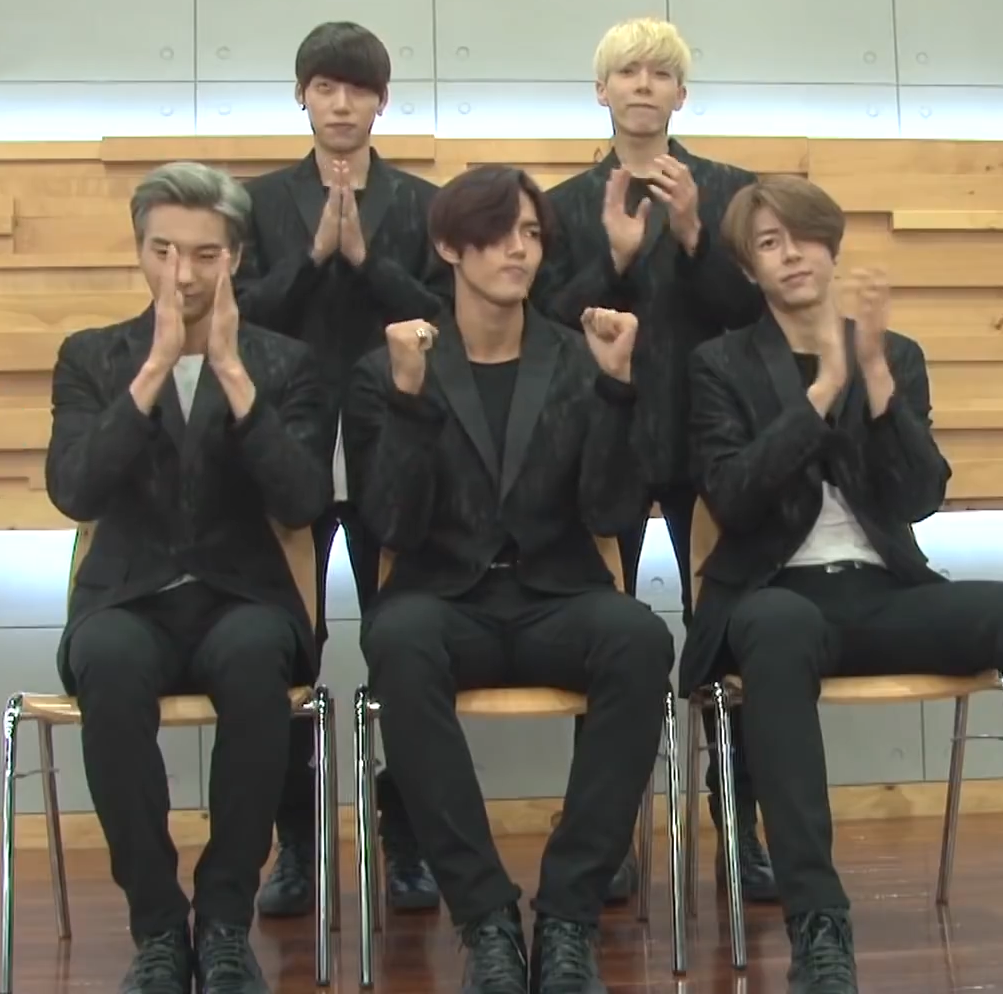
- History in 2015

Background information
- Origin: Seoul, South Korea
- Genres: K-pop
- Years active: 2013–2017
- Labels: LOEN Entertainment; KISS Entertainment (Japan)
- Past members: Kyungil; Dokyun; Sihyoung; Jaeho; Yijeong
- Website: History Official Profile

History (Korean: 히스토리) was a South Korean boy band formed by LOEN Entertainment in 2013. They debuted on April 26, 2013 with "Dreamer", featuring the narration of their labelmate IU. They were LOEN Entertainment's first boy group. They officially disbanded on May 12, 2017.

== History ==
=== Pre-debut ===
LOEN Entertainment announced on April 12, 2013 that they would be debuting their first male idol group named "History" on 26th of that month. At the same time, they unveiled two of the group's members, Kim Si-hyoung (who had previously appeared on Ulzzang Generation Season 3) and Jang Yi-jeong (who had appeared on Birth of a Great Star 2).

Prior to their debut, Na Do-kyun had been a vocalist for the rock/ballad group Buzz under the stage name Na Yul, while Song Kyung-il had been a dancer with appearances in IU's "Beautiful Dancer" and Fiestar's "Vista" music videos, as well as performances of IU's "Cruel Fairy Tale" on SBS Inkigayo and GD TV. Kyung-il was also a part of the de facto group Nuthang (pronounced ‘new-thang’), whose members included Big Bang's G-Dragon and T.O.P among other figures.

=== 2013: Debut with "Dreamer", Just Now, and Blue Spring ===
In April 2013, LOEN Entertainment released a first teaser for the group starring IU, titled "Do you know us?". A series of teaser trailers featuring the five members titled 'Real Dating Tip Book' was also released and it was announced that actress and singer Son Dam Bi would appear in the upcoming music video for the group's debut single, "Dreamer". The single was composed by Lee Min-soo and written by Kim Eana, featuring narration from IU and rap written by Sunny Hill's Misung. The group made their first live broadcast performance on Show! Music Core.

On August 20, History released the single "Tell Me Love" (produced by V.O.S's Choi Hyun-joon and composer Lim Kwang-wook, with lyrics by Eluphant's Keebee) and the mini-album Just Now.

The group's second mini-album Blue Spring was released in November of the same year, produced by Cho Young-chul and with lyrics by Kim Eana. The title track, "What Am I To You", was released on November 26 with a music video directed by Hwang Su-ah, who previously worked on IU's singles "The Red Shoes" and "Good Day" as well as Ga-In's "Bloom". Shortly after that, Yijeong featured on IU's single "Friday" from the repackage album Modern Times- Epilogue. The single was a domestic and international success, charting at number one on the Billboard K-pop Hot 100.

=== 2014–2017: Desire, Beyond the History, Him and disbandment ===
On June 23, 2014, History made their comeback with the five-track EP Desire, including the title track "Psycho", composed by Lee Min-soo and East4A with lyrics by Kim Eana. Yijeong participated in writing the lyrics for the tracks "I Got U" and "Blue Moon". Longtime producer Cho Young-chul, who had previously worked on History's debut single "Dreamer" and their previous mini-albums Just Now and Blue Spring, also participated in the EP's production.

History released their fourth EP Beyond the History on May 20, 2015, along with the title track "Might Just Die".

The following year, on April 11, 2016, they released their fifth EP Him, with the title track "Queen".

The group was officially announced to be disbanding on May 12, 2017, with Kyungil enlisted in the military as part of South Korea's compulsory military service and the rest of the members required to enlist soon. All members remain signed to Loen Entertainment, but following their military service will be focusing on individual activities.

== Members ==
- Song Kyung-il (now is 1iL) (송경일) — leader, rapper, vocalist
- Na Do-kyun (나도균) — vocalist
- Kim Si-hyoung (김시형) — rapper
- Kim Jae-ho (김재호) — rapper, vocalist
- Jang Yi-jeong (장이정) — vocalist

== Discography ==
=== Extended plays ===
List of extended plays, with selected details, chart positions, and sales
Title	Album details	Peak chart positions		Sales
Title	Album details	KOR	JPN	Sales
Just Now	Released: August 20, 2013; Label: LOEN Entertainment; Formats: CD, digital download; Track listing: 1. Tell Me Love (열대야); 2. Blind; 3. Ma Red Night; 4. Why Not; 5. Tell Me Love (열대야) inst.	19	—	KOR: 1,711+
Blue Spring	Released: November 28, 2013; Label: LOEN Entertainment; Formats: CD, digital download; Track listing: 1. What Am I To You? (난 너한테 뭐야?); 2. Hello; 3. Tomorrow; 4. Easy (신파); 5. What Am I To You? (난 너한테 뭐야?) inst.	16	—	KOR: 2,069+
Desire	Released: June 23, 2014; Label: LOEN Entertainment; Formats: CD, digital download; Track listing: 1. I Got U 2. Psycho (싸이코); 3. Nobody Nowhere (태양은 없다); 4. It's Alright; 5. Blue Moon	10	—	KOR: 2,627+
Beyond The History	Released: May 21, 2015; Label: LOEN Entertainment; Formats: CD, digital download; Track listing: 1. Mind Game; 2. Might Just Die (죽어버릴지도 몰라); 3. Ghost; 4. Slow Down; 5. 1Century (Yi Jeong Solo)	8	—	KOR: 2,085+
Him	Released: April 10, 2016; Label: LOEN Entertainment; Formats: CD, digital download; Track listing: 1. Wild Boy; 2. Queen; 3. Baby, Hello; 4. Whenever (그럴 때면) (Do Kyun Solo); 5. Lost; 6. Liar; 7. Wild Boy inst.; 8. Queen inst.	3	27	KOR: 45,048; JPN: 16,246

=== Single albums ===
Title	Album details	Peak chart positions	Sales
Title	Album details	KOR	Sales
Dreamer	Released: April 26, 2013; Label: LOEN Entertainment; Formats: CD, digital download; Track listing: 1. Dreamer (narr. IU); 2. D-Day; 3. The Last Time	13	KOR: 1,515+

=== Singles ===
List of singles, with selected chart positions, showing year released, sales and album name
Title	Year	Peak chart positions		Sales	Album
Title	Year	KOR	JPN	Sales	Album
"Dreamer" (narr. IU)	2013	73	—N/a	KOR: 56,564	Dreamer
"Tell Me Love" (열대야)	2013	85	—N/a	KOR: 20,501	Just Now
"What Am I To You?" (난 너한테 뭐야?)	2013	183	—N/a	KOR: 9,789	Blue Spring
"Psycho" (싸이코)	2014	—	—N/a		Desire
"Might Just Die" (죽어버릴지도 몰라)	2015	—	—N/a	KOR: 7,615	Beyond The History
"My Love" (消えてしまった)	2015	—N/a	7	JPN: 17,200+	Non-album single
"Lost"	2015	—N/a	6	JPN: 34,300+	Him
"Queen"	2016	—	—N/a		Him
"—" denotes releases that did not chart or were not released in that region.

== Awards ==
Year	Awards	Category	Result
2013	5th Melon Music Awards	Best New Artist	Nominated
2014	28th Golden Disk Awards	New Rising Stars	Nominated
