= Go On (actor) =

South Korean actor

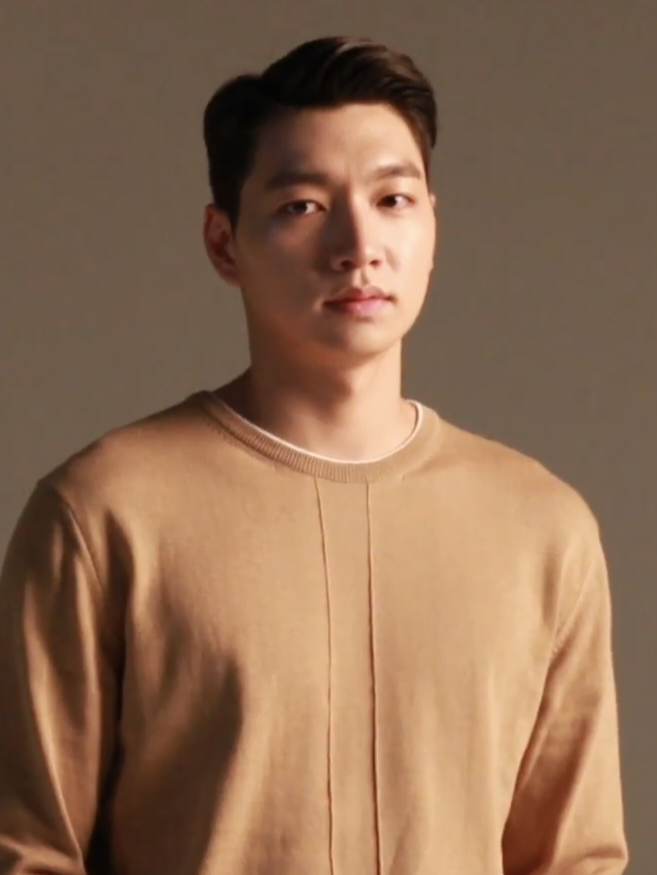
- Go in 2017
- Born: Baek Chul-min; 5 July 1992 (age 34); Seoul, South Korea
- Other name: Baek Cheol-min
- Occupations: Actor; model
- Years active: 2014–present
- Agent: E-Um Contents
- Known for: Solomon's Perjury; Kill Me, Heal Me; Andante

Baek Chul-min, known by the stage name Go On, is South Korean actor and model. He is known for his lead role in Andante. He is also for his roles in dramas such as Solomon's Perjury, Kill Me, Heal Me and Witch at Court.

== Biography and career ==
Baek was a professional model before he debuted as an actor. Born on July 5, 1992, he made his acting debut in the 2014 television drama Secret Door. He gained attention with a supporting role in the popular 2015 drama Kill Me, Heal Me as Alex that gained him wider recognition. He then appeared in dramas such as Run Toward Tomorrow, Matching! Boys Archery and Solomon's Perjury. He also did a lead role in Andante.

== Filmography ==
=== Television ===
Year	Title	Role	Ref.
2014	Aftermath Season 2	Person saying Dae Yon is fake	
2014	Secret Door	Pagan	
2015	Run Towards Tomorrow	Choi Woo-ram	
2015	Kill Me, Heal Me	Alex Kang	
2016	Matching! Boys Archery	Joo Seung-joon	
2016	Solomon's Perjury	Choi Woo-hyuk	
2017	Andante	Park Ga-ram	
2017	Witch at Court	Ahn Tae-gyu	
2018	Your Honor	Kang In-gyoo	
2022	Three Bold Siblings	Bae Dong-chan	

=== Film ===
Year	Title	Role	Language	Ref.
2015	Wonderful Nightmare	Park Chan-jin	Korean	
