= Human, Space, Time and Human =

- Poster
- Hangul: 인간, 공간, 시간 그리고 인간
- Hanja: 人間, 空間, 時間 그리고 人間
- RR: Ingan, gonggan, sigan geurigo ingan
- MR: In'gan, konggan, sigan kŭrigo in'gan
- Directed by: Kim Ki-duk
- Written by: Kim Ki-duk
- Produced by: Kim Dong-hoo
- Cinematography: Lee Jeong-in
- Edited by: Kim Ki-duk
- Music by: Park In-young
- Production company: Kim Ki-duk Film
- Release date: February 17, 2018 (Berlinale)
- Running time: 122 minutes
- Country: South Korea
- Languages: Korean; Japanese

Human, Space, Time and Human is a 2018 South Korean drama film directed by Kim Ki-duk.

== Plot ==
The film follows people of various ages and occupations traveling on a warship (the Jeonbuk), and explores the limits of humanity and morality.

== Cast ==
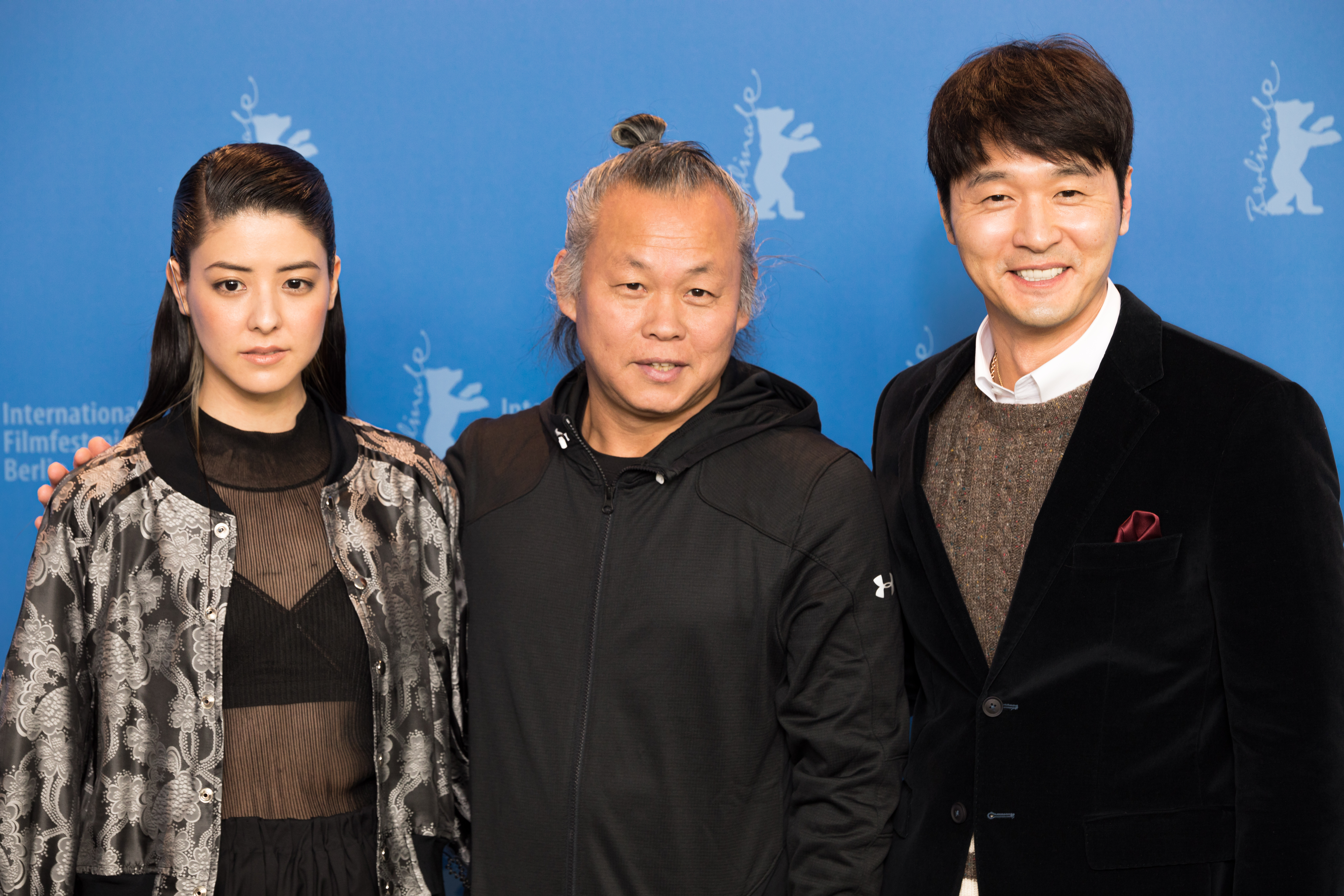
Actress Mina Fujii, director Kim Ki-duk und actor Lee Sung-Jae during a photo call at the Berlinale 2018.

- Mina Fujii as Eve
- Jang Keun-suk as Adam
- Ahn Sung-ki as The old man
- Lee Sung-jae as Adam's father
- Ryoo Seung-bum as Gangster boss
- Sung Ki-youn as Captain
- Joe Odagiri as Eve's boyfriend
- Woo Ki-hoon as Ki-seok
- Kim Dong-chan
- Ahn Philip
- Lee Yoo-joon
- Tae Hang-ho
- Son Fe-ya
- Park Se-in

== Production ==
Principal photography began in May 2017 and ended in early July 2017.

== Reception ==
On review aggregator website Rotten Tomatoes, the film has an approval rating of 20% based on five reviews.

== See also ==
- Ages of Man
