= The Master of Revenge =

2016 South Korean television series

- Promotional poster
- Hangul: 마스터 – 국수의 신
- RR: Maseuteo – guksuui sin
- MR: Masŭt'ŏ – kuksuŭi sin
- Genre: Revenge; Melodrama
- Based on: God of Noodles by Park In-kwon
- Written by: Chae Seung-dae
- Directed by: Kim Jong-yeon
- Starring: Chun Jung-myung; Cho Jae-hyun; Jeong Yu-mi; Lee Sang-yeob; Gong Seung-yeon
- Music by: Park Seung-jin
- Country of origin: South Korea
- Original language: Korean
- No. of episodes: 20

Production
- Executive producers: Bae Kyung-soo; Yoon Young-ha; Choi Ji-yoon; Park Jae-sam
- Producers: Han Sang-woo; Lee Young-beom
- Production location: South Korea
- Production companies: Verdi Media; Celltrion Entertainment (formerly Dream E&M)

Original release
- Network: KBS2
- Release: April 27 – June 30, 2016

The Master of Revenge (Korean: 마스터 – 국수의 신; lit. 'Master – God of Noodles') is a 2016 South Korean television series starring Chun Jung-myung, Cho Jae-hyun, Jeong Yu-mi, Lee Sang-yeob and Gong Seung-yeon. It aired on KBS2 from April 27, 2016 to June 30, 2016 on Wednesdays and Thursdays at 21:55 for 20 episodes, replacing Descendants of the Sun.

== Synopsis ==
A man whose name and life were taken from him seeks revenge. To do so, he must attempt to become a master noodle cook, or a god of noodles.

== Cast ==
=== Main characters ===
- Chun Jung-myung as Moo Myung-yi / Choi Soon-seok
  - Go Woo-rim as child Moo Myung-yi
- Cho Jae-hyun as Kim Gil-do
  - Park Chan as child Kim Gil-do
  - Cha Sun-woo as teen Kim Gil-do
- Jeong Yu-mi as Chae Yeo-kyung
  - Choi Ji-won as child Chae Yeo-kyung
- Lee Sang-yeob as Park Tae-ha
  - Lee Geon-ha as child Park Tae-ha
- Gong Seung-yeon as Kim Da-hae
  - Lee Go-eun as child Kim Da-hae

=== Supporting characters ===
==== Goongrakwon ====
- Kim Min-sang as Min Seon-ho (Head of Noodles)
- Cha Do-jin as Lee Gi-baek (2nd Head of Noodles)
- Kim Min-ho as Kim Jin-hak
- Choi Dae-seong as Na Won-sang (Head of Meats)
- Nam Moon-cheol as Park Moon-bok (Head of Broth)
- Son San as Kim Jin-nyeo (Head of Banchan)
- Im Do-yoon as Hong Cheo-nyeo (2nd Head of Banchan)
- Yeo Moo-young as Ha Tae-bong (Restaurant Manager)

==== Extended cast ====
- Kim Jae-young as Go Gil-yong
  - Ahn Won-jin as child Go Gil-yong
- Choi Jong-won as Go Dae-cheon
- Lee Ye-hyun as Go Gang-seok
- Lee Il-hwa as Go Gang-sook
- Seo Yi-sook as Seol Mi-ja
- Jo Hee-bong as Dokku Jin
- Kim Byung-ki as So Tae-seob
- Um Hyo-sup as Senator Choi
- Son Yeo-eun as Do Hyun-jeong
- Kim Joo-wan as Hwang Sung-rok (Kim Gil-do's assistant)
- Jo Deok-hyun as Ha Jeong-tae
  - Noh Young-hak as teen Ha Jeong-tae
- Oh Yoon-hong as Choi Ok-shim (Choi Soon-seok's mother)
- Oh Yong as Lee Myung-shik (orphanage director)
- Park Ji-hwan as Doo-chul
- Kwak Dong-yeon as Lee Yong-joo (Park Tae-ha's prison mate)
- Chae Min-hee as Chae Yeo-kyung's teacher and friend
- Cha Jung-won as Kim Da-hae's friend
- Lee Jin-mok
- Seo Jin-won
- Ji Seong-geun
- Ham Jin-seong
- Yook Dong-il
- Im Hyung-taek
- Yoo Geum
- Kim Hyun
- Kang Chul-sung
- Lee Gyu-ho
- Choi Hyo-sang
- Yang Seung-geol
- Lee Jung-sung
- Shin Chi-young
- Kim Jae-geon
- Joo Hyo-man
- Jin Yong-wook
- Kim Choo-wol
- Lee Gyu-seop
- Park Young-soo
- Kwon Hong-seok
- Dan Kang-ho
- Lee Jong-goo
- Kwon Oh-soo
- Lee Young-jin as Kim Kyung-jang
- Choi Byung-mo as Ahn Joong-yong
- Han Sung-sik
- Heo Seon-haeng
- Jin Yong-wook
- Oh Hwa-yeol
- Choi Yong-jin

=== Cameo appearances ===
- Ryu Hyun-kyung as Kim Seon-joo (Kim Da-hae's mother)

== Ratings ==
In the table below, the blue numbers represent the lowest ratings and the red numbers represent the highest ratings.

Episode #	Original broadcast date	Average audience share			
Episode #	Original broadcast date	TNmS Ratings		AGB Nielsen Ratings	
Episode #	Original broadcast date	Nationwide	Seoul National Capital Area	Nationwide	Seoul National Capital Area
1	April 27, 2016	6.8%	7.6%	7.6%	8.6%
2	April 28, 2016	6.4%	6.8%	6.5%	7.0%
3	May 4, 2016	6.1%	<6.5%	7.3%	7.6%
4	May 5, 2016	5.3%	5.0%	6.0%	6.4%
5	May 11, 2016	6.4%	6.6%	6.6%	6.9%
6	May 12, 2016	6.1%	<7.3%	7.4%	<7.8%
7	May 18, 2016	6.3%	<7.0%	7.0%	<7.3%
8	May 19, 2016	5.5%	<7.7%	6.6%	<7.6%
9	May 25, 2016	7.1%	7.4%	6.8%	<7.7%
10	May 26, 2016	7.0%	7.1%	8.0%	8.2%
11	June 1, 2016	8.0%	9.0%	7.2%	<7.1%
12	June 2, 2016	7.2%	8.0%	8.6%	8.5%
13	June 8, 2016	7.7%	8.3%	7.9%	7.9%
14	June 9, 2016	7.2%	7.9%	6.9%	<7.1%
15	June 15, 2016	6.6%	6.7%	6.9%	6.7%
16	June 16, 2016	7.5%	7.9%	9.0%	8.6%
17	June 22, 2016	6.6%	6.8%	7.4%	7.6%
18	June 23, 2016	6.3%	6.1%	7.2%	<6.7%
19	June 29, 2016	6.6%	7.0%	7.5%	7.1%
20	June 30, 2016	7.1%	7.7%	8.2%	8.1%
Average		6.69%	<7.22% (Note: lack of information)	7.33%	<7.53%

== Awards and nominations ==
Year	Award	Category	Recipient	Result
2016	30th KBS Drama Awards	Excellence Award, Actor in a Mid-length Drama	Cho Jae-hyun	Nominated
2016	30th KBS Drama Awards	Excellence Award, Actress in a Mid-length Drama	Jeong Yu-mi	Nominated
2016	30th KBS Drama Awards	Best New Actress	Gong Seung-yeon	Nominated
2016	30th KBS Drama Awards	Best Young Actor	Go Woo-rim	Nominated
2017	53rd Baeksang Arts Awards	Best New Actress (Television)	Gong Seung-yeon	Nominated
