= Solomon's Perjury (TV series) =

2016 South Korean television series

- Promotional poster
- Genre: Mystery Teen
- Based on: Solomon's Perjury by Miyuki Miyabe
- Developed by: JTBC
- Written by: Kim Ho-soo
- Directed by: Kang Il-soo
- Starring: Kim Hyun-soo; Jang Dong-yoon; Seo Ji-hoon
- Country of origin: South Korea
- Original language: Korean
- No. of seasons: 1
- No. of episodes: 12

Production
- Executive producers: Ham Young-hoon; Cho Joon-hyoung; Kim Jong-sik; Song Chae-joon
- Producers: Jang Ji-yeon; Kim Yeon-im
- Running time: 60 minutes
- Production company: iWill Media

Original release
- Network: JTBC
- Release: December 16, 2016 – January 28, 2017

Solomon's Perjury (Korean: 솔로몬의 위증; RR: Sollomonui wijeung) is a 2016 South Korean television series starring Kim Hyeon-soo, Jang Dong-yoon, Seo Ji-hoon, Seo Young-joo and Cho Jae-hyun based on the novel of the same title by Japanese novelist Miyuki Miyabe. It aired on cable network JTBC on Fridays and Saturdays at 20:30 (KST) time slot from December 16, 2016 to January 28, 2017 for 12 episodes.

== Synopsis ==
A student from an elite high school fell to his death on Christmas Day. Just as the police and the school were ready to wrap it up as a suicide, a student claimed to have witnessed the murder. That witness got into a car accident soon after. The students became restless and uneasy. Hounded by the media and frustrated with the surrounding adults who ignored their pleas and questions, they decided to hold their own school trial, where each student had their own role to play.

== Cast ==
=== Main ===
- Kim Hyun-soo as Go Seo-yeon

A student at a well-known high school, she is intelligent and determined. Although as a class president, she tries to help struggling students from time to time, she's ordinarily just a simple girl who wants to pass high school smoothly and then enter a good college. A murder incident at the school will thrust her onto a pedestal and change her life. She acts as a prosecutor in the school trial.

- Jang Dong-yoon as Han Ji-hoon

An adopted son of a former prosecutor, he is a student from another school who has a dark secret that could be the key to solving the case. A cellist and Lee So-woo's best friend, he assumes the identity of The Watchman of Jung Guk High School. He acts as a defense attorney in the school trial.

- Seo Ji-hoon as Bae Joon-young

The first one who found Lee So-woo's body. Growing up in a dysfunctional family, he is being suspected by his own mother and had suicidal thoughts for a while. Has a crush on Go Seo-yeon. He acts as an assistant attorney in the school trial.

- Seo Young-joo as Lee So-woo

The dead student. He tried not to stand-out, but had keen observation skills and a cynical view of the world. He was the original owner of a secret SNS account, The Watchman of Jung Guk High School.

- Cho Jae-hyun as Han Kyung-moon

He is the legal counsel of the school's foundation and a former prosecutor. He adopted Ji-hoon and supported him, to the point that he is even ready to conceal anything that can ruin his adopted son's life.

=== Supporting ===
Classmates

- Go On as Choi Woo-hyuk

The defendant in the school trial, since many students saw him and Lee So-woo fight near the time of his death.

- Shin Se-hwi as Lee Joo-ri

The supposed witness of the murder of Lee So-woo.

- Woo Ki-hoon as Kim Min-suk

The deputy class president. A studious and rigid boy. He acts as the judge in the school trial.

- Seo Shin-ae as Park Cho-rong

A classmate of Go Seo-yeon and Bae Joon-young and close friend of Lee Joo-ri. She's in a coma after a car accident.

- Kim So-hee as Kim Soo-hee

Best friends with Go Seo-yeon and Lee Yoo-jin, part of the prosecutors' team in the school trial.

- Ahn Sol-bin as Lee Yoo-jin

Close friend of Go Seo-yeon and Kim Soo-hee, part of the prosecutors' team in the school trial.

- Ahn Seung-gyun as Choi Seung-hyun

Best friend of Kim Soo-hee, Lee Yoo-jin, Kim Min-suk and Go Seo-yeon, part of the prosecutors' team in the school trial.

- Go Soo-jung as Girl reading a memorial service

Classmate of Choi Woo-hyuk.

- Lee Do-gyeom as Lee Sung-min

Best friend of Choi Woo-hyuk and Kim Dong-hyun.

- Yang Hak-jin as Kim Dong-hyun

Friend of Choi Woo-hyuk and Lee Sung-min.

- Park Gyu-young as Baek Hye-rin

Girlfriend of Choi Woo-hyuk.

The Adults

- Ahn Nae-sang as Go Sang-joong

Go Seo-yeon's father. He is a detective.

- Kim Yeo-jin as Go Seo-yeon's mother

The mother of Go Seo-yeon. She is ready to defend her family and fight for what is right.

- Lee Kyung-shim as Bae Joon-young's mother

The mother of Bae Joon-young, a depressed and sick woman who suspects that her son has something to do with Lee So-woo's death.

- Choi Joon-yong as Choi Woo-hyuk's father

The father of Choi Woo-hyuk, an arrogant man who always uses money and power to take care of problems.

- Shim Yi-young as Detective Oh

The detective in charge of the dead student's case.

- Heo Jung-do as Reporter Park

A reporter who takes a big interest in the case and then the students' trial.

- Shin Eun-jung as teacher Kim

A teacher at the high school that Seo-yeon and Ji-hoon attend.

- Ji Yi-soo as Homeroom teacher

She is the homeroom teacher of class 2-1.

- Oh Yoon-hong as Student advisor

A stern and uncompromising teacher, she can be mean to the students.

- Yoo Ha-bok as The Principal

He is the principal of the high school. He has many hidden secrets.

- Ryu Tae-ho as The Vice Principal

The vice principal of the high school. He is confused as to whether he should be on the school's side or students' side.

=== Cameos ===
- Choi Deok-moon as Kim Sang-deok

== Ratings ==
In this table, the blue numbers represent the lowest ratings and the red numbers represent the highest ratings.

Ep.	Original broadcast date	Average audience share	
Ep.	Original broadcast date	AGB Nielsen	TNmS
Ep.	Original broadcast date	Nationwide	Nationwide
1	December 16, 2016	1.422%	1.5%
2	December 17, 2016	1.106%	0.6%
3	December 23, 2016	1.731%	1.3%
4	December 24, 2016	0.970%	1.0%
5	January 6, 2017	1.614%	1.1%
6	January 7, 2017	0.836%	0.6%
7	January 13, 2017	1.204%	1.2%
8	January 14, 2017	1.268%	1.1%
9	January 20, 2017	1.537%	1.3%
10	January 21, 2017	0.730%	0.7%
11	January 27, 2017	1.142%	1.3%
12	January 28, 2017	0.722%	0.8%
Average		1.190%	1.0%

- This drama aired on a cable channel/pay TV which normally has a relatively smaller audience compared to free-to-air TV/public broadcasters (KBS, SBS, MBC and EBS).
- Episode 5-6 were delayed a week due to the special New Year broadcast of JTBC's variety shows Phantom Singer and Package Tour on December 30–31, 2016.

== Production ==
The series is directed by Kang Il-soo (KBS 2TV's Emperor of the Sea, The Kingdom of the Winds and Jeon Woo-chi, KBS 1TV's Taejo Wanggun).

JTBC released the first video teaser on November 18, 2016 through the YouTube channel of its drama unit.

The first cast and crew meeting was held on November 22, 2016 at the JTBC studios in Sangam-dong, Seoul.

== International broadcast ==
Streaming rights to this drama are held by On Demand Korea, Netflix, and Viki.

This drama also aired on Disney plus Hotstar in India With Multiples languages.

== See also ==
- The 2015 two-part movie series based on the same novel.
