= Lee Ye-hyun =

South Korean actress (born 1995)

- Born: Lee Ye-hyun; 25 June 1995 (age 31); Jeonju, South Korea
- Other names: Yoo Jae-yi; Lee Ye-hyeon
- Education: Seoul Institute of the Arts (Department of Acting)
- Occupation: Actress
- Years active: 2016–present
- Agent: Soo Entertainment
- Known for: The Real Has Come! The Master of Revenge; Andante
- Spouse: Unknown (m. 2025)

Lee Ye-hyun is a South Korean actress. She is best known for her roles in dramas such as Extraordinary You, The Master of Revenge, Andante and The Real Has Come!.

== Filmography ==
=== Television series ===
Year	Title	Role	Ref.
2016	The Master of Revenge	Go Gang-seok	
2017	Andate	Lee Shi-young	
2019	Extraordinary You	Kim Soo-hyang	
2020	Cold Case Provisional Task Force	Lee Min-joo	
2023	The Real Has Come!	Gong Yoo-myeong	
2024	Miss Night and Day	Mi-jin's co-worker	

=== Film ===
Year	Title	Role	Language	Ref.
2018	Be-Bop-A-Lula	Ye-in	Korean	
2019	Intern Detective	Soo-hyeon	Korean	
