= Ahn Seung-gyun =

South Korean actor

- Born: Ahn Seung-gyun; 18 January 1994 (age 32); South Korea
- Other names: Ahn Seung Kyoon, An Seung Gyun, Ahn Seung Kyun
- Education: School of Performing Arts Seoul (Department of Visual Arts); Kookmin University (Department of Drama and Film)
- Occupation: Actor
- Years active: 2016–present
- Agent: PF Entertainment

Korean name
- Hangul: 안승균
- RR: An Seunggyun
- MR: An Sŭnggyun

Ahn Seung-gyun (Korean: 안승균; born 18 January 1994) is a South Korean actor. He is best known for starring in television dramas such as Still 17 (2018), Solomon's Perjury (2016), Tale of Fairy (2018) and Netflix's All of Us Are Dead (2022).

== Personal life ==
=== Military service ===
Ahn enlisted for mandatory military service on February 17, 2022.

== Filmography ==
=== Film ===
Year	Title	Role	Notes	Ref.
2016	Queen of Walking	Jung-don		
2018	60 Days of Summer	Yoon-sung		
2022	Love and Leashes	Lee Han	Netflix film	
2022	My Son	Hee Jun-yang		
2022	Kill Me Now	Hyeon-jae		

=== Television series ===
Year	Title	Role	Ref.
2016	Solomon's Perjury	Choi Seung-hyun	
2017	Idol Fever	Seung-gyun	
2017	KBS Drama Special – "If We Were a Season"	Seo Min-joon	
2017	School 2017	Ahn Jung Il	
2017	Andante	Min Gi-hoon	
2018	My Mister	Song Ki-beom	
2018	Still 17	Jin-hyun	
2018	Tale of Fairy	Oh Kyung-shik	
2019	Haechi	Ah-bong	
2019	KBS Drama Special – "Socialization: Understanding of Dance"	Lee Byung-hyun	
2019	Catch the Ghost	Kang Soo-ho	
2020	365: Repeat the Year	Go Jae-young	
2025	Secret: Untold Melody	Gyeong-bong	

=== Web series ===
Year	Title	Role	Ref.
2022	All of Us Are Dead	Oh Joon-yeong	

== Awards and nominations ==
Name of the award ceremony, year presented, category, nominee of the award, and the result of the nomination
Award ceremony	Year	Category	Nominee / Work	Result	Ref.
42nd Durban International Film Festival	2021	Best Actor Award	My Son	Won	
