= Go Soo-jung =

South Korean actress (1995–2020)

- Born: April 17, 1995; South Korea
- Died: February 7, 2020 (aged 24)
- Education: Seokyeong University
- Occupations: Actress; model
- Years active: 2016–2020
- Agent: Story J Company
- Known for: Solomon's Perjury; Goblin; Search Out

Korean name
- Hangul: 고수정
- RR: Go Sujeong
- MR: Ko Sujŏng

Go Soo-jung (Korean: 고수정; April 17, 1995 – February 7, 2020) was a South Korean actress and model. She was best known for starring in Goblin and Solomon's Perjury. She also appeared in a music video for BTS's song "With Seoul".

== Biography ==
Go Soo-jung was born on April 17, 1995. She started her acting career in 2016 and she also did modeling. She did supporting in dramas such as Goblin and Solomon's Perjury.

=== Illness and death ===
She died on February 7, 2020. Her agency Story J Company stated that she died due to chronic illness. Her parents held the funeral privately.

== Filmography ==
=== Television ===
Year	Title	Role	Ref.
2016	Goblin	Ghost	
2016–2017	Solomon's Perjury	Girl reading a memorial service	

=== Film ===
Year	Title	Role	Ref.
2020	Search Out	Tenant	

=== Music video appearances ===
Year	Song title	Artist	Ref.
2019	"With Seoul"	BTS	
