= Kim Hyun-soo (actress) =

South Korean actress (born 2000)

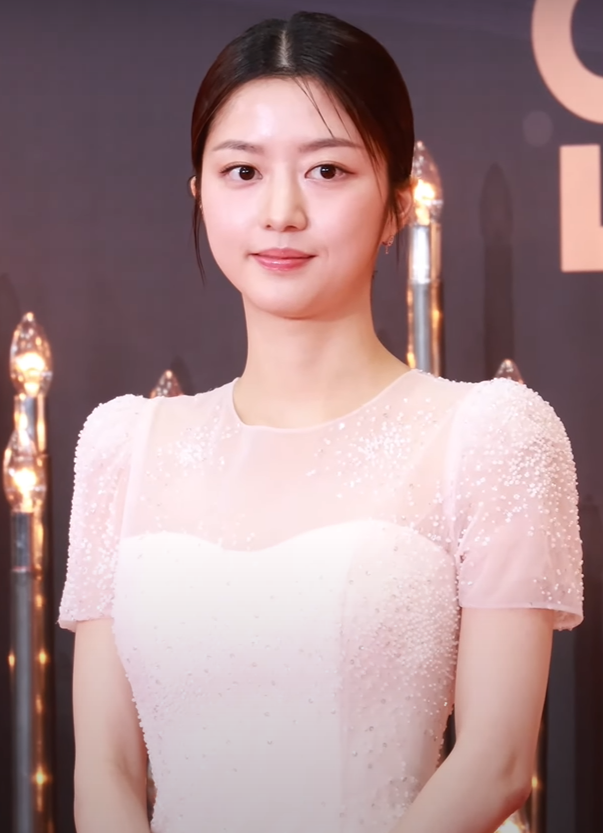
- Kim in December 2023
- Born: June 23, 2000 (age 26); Osan, South Korea
- Education: Chung-Ang University – Theater and Film
- Occupation: Actress
- Years active: 2011–present
- Agent: Andmarq

Korean name
- Hangul: 김현수
- Hanja: 金賢秀
- RR: Gim Hyeonsu
- MR: Kim Hyŏnsu

Kim Hyun-soo (Korean: 김현수; born June 23, 2000) is a South Korean actress. She often starred as the younger version of female protagonists in television series such as Bridal Mask and My Love from the Star, before receiving her first leading role in Solomon's Perjury. Kim's most notable on-screen role so far is Bae Ro-na from The Penthouse: War in Life (2020–2021).

== Career ==
Kim started to work in the entertainment industry as a child model. She debuted as an actress through 2011 film Silenced, in which her role as a deaf student who suffered abuse landed her the nomination for Best Supporting Actress at the 49th Grand Bell Awards. Kim then starred as the younger version of female protagonist in several hit series, notably Deep Rooted Tree, Bridal Mask and My Love from the Star. She played her first regular role in TV series with Gunman in Joseon.

In 2016, she acted alongside Kim Hye-soo in the well-received dramedy film Familyhood, as a high school girl who got caught up in teenage pregnancy. Later that year, Kim has been cast as the protagonist for the first time in JTBC's youth mystery drama, Solomon's Perjury.

Kim costarred with Jang Hyuk for the 2020 historical action film, The Swordsman. In the same year, she was cast in SBS melodrama suspense The Penthouse: War in Life, in which her role as a girl who strives to be top soprano singer amidst many obstacles, got her nominated for Best New Actress at the most prestigious TV Awards in South Korea, 57th Baeksang Arts Awards.

On April 25, 2022, Kim signed with Andmarq.

== Filmography ==
=== Film ===
| Year | Title | Role | Notes | Ref. |
|---|---|---|---|---|
| 2011 | Silenced | Kim Yeon-doo | | |
| 2012 | Horror Stories | Seon-yi | Segment: "Don't Answer to the Door" | |
| 2013 | The Five | Kim Ga-young | | |
| 2014 | Murderer | Ji-soo | | |
| 2015 | The Treacherous | Young Dan-hee | | |
| 2016 | Familyhood | Kim Dan-ji | | |
| 2018 | Be with You | Young Im Soo-ah | | |
| 2020 | The Swordsman | Tae-ok | | |
| 2021 | Whispering Corridors 6: The Humming | Kim Ha-young | | |

=== Television series ===
| Year | Title | Role | Notes | Ref. |
|---|---|---|---|---|
| 2011 | 49 Days | young Shin Ji-min | | |
| 2011 | Deep Rooted Tree | young Dam / So-yi | | |
| 2011 | Living in Style | Jo Han-yi | | |
| 2011 | High Kick: Revenge of the Short Legged | young Kim Ji-won | | |
| 2012 | Bridal Mask | young Boon-yi / Mok-dan/Esther | | |
| 2012 | Dream of the Emperor | young Princess Seungman | | |
| 2013 | Good Doctor | Na In-hae | | |
| 2013 | My Love from the Star | young Cheon Song-yi / Seo Yi-hwa | | |
| 2014 | Gunman in Joseon | Park Yeon-ha | | |
| 2016 | Solomon's Perjury | Go Seo-yeon | | |
| 2018 | Mother | young Kang Soo-jin | | |
| 2019 | Rookie Historian Goo Hae-ryung | So Young-hwa | Cameo | |
| 2020–2021 | The Penthouse: War in Life | Bae Ro-na | Season 1–3 | |
| 2022 | Artificial City | Do Eun-young | Cameo (episode 20) | |

=== Web series ===
| Year | Title | Role | Ref. |
|---|---|---|---|
| 2019 | Biggest Fan | Jung Yu-hee | |

=== Television show ===
| Year | Title | Role | Ref. |
|---|---|---|---|
| 2014 | Star Friends | Cast member | |

=== Music video appearances ===
| Year | Song title | Artist(s) | Ref. |
|---|---|---|---|
| 2014 | "Sogyeokdong" | IU & Seo Taiji | |

== Awards and nominations ==
Name of the award ceremony, year presented, category, nominee of the award, and the result of the nomination
| Award ceremony | Year | Category | Nominee / work | Result | Ref. |
|---|---|---|---|---|---|
| APAN Star Awards | 2014 | Best Young Actress | My Love from the Star | Won | |
| Baeksang Arts Awards | 2021 | Best New Actress – Television | The Penthouse: War in Life | Nominated | |
| Brand of the Year Awards | 2021 | Rising Star Actress | Kim Hyun-soo | Nominated | |
| Grand Bell Awards | 2012 | Best Supporting Actress | Silenced | Nominated | |
| KBS Drama Awards | 2012 | Best Young Actress | Bridal Mask | Nominated | |
| KBS Drama Awards | 2013 | Best Young Actress | Good Doctor & Dream of the Emperor | Nominated | |
| KBS Drama Awards | 2014 | Best Young Actress | Gunman in Joseon | Nominated | |
| SBS Drama Awards | 2020 | Best Young Actress | The Penthouse: War in Life | Won | |
