= We Don't Stop =

2012 single by Fiestar

- Digital cover and stylized gold cover with designable colored version.

Single by Fiestar
- B-side: "Sweet Love"
- Released: November 9, 2012
- Recorded: 2012
- Genre: Dance-pop
- Length: 3:28
- Label: LOEN Entertainment
- Songwriters: Shin Hyuk, D'day, Jasmine Kearse, Brittani White DK, Edward Ross Lara

Fiestar Korean singles chronology
"Vista" (2012)	"We Don't Stop" (2012)	"I Don't Know" (2013)

Music video
- "We Don't Stop" on YouTube

"We Don't Stop" is a song and second single by South Korean girl group, Fiestar. The single was released on November 9, 2012, by LOEN Entertainment.

== History ==
Fiestar's Cheska tweeted on her Twitter account that they will be making a comeback on November 9, which was later confirmed by LOEN Entertainment by releasing new teaser images.

A short BTS footage of the recording of "Sweet Love" featuring Kim Yeon-woo was released on November 3, followed by the full audio on the next day. They also released a CSI 7-minute video of "We Don't Stop".

== Music video ==
The music video starts in a construction site, where Jei appears on the window, seemingly annoyed by the noise. She goes to the rooftop, befriending the other members on her way up. It is then revealed that the building is angled, allowing the girls are able to stand on the building itself. The girls jump on a window, entering into a funky room.

During close-ups, the girls are seen in the funky room, playing. The girls are shown leaving the funky room, each part of the room glowing, transporting them into a neon room. A dance scene is followed again. They are again appearing in the rooftop of the construction site, each of them in a line, then facing the screen, only being followed by Yezi's rap. They jump down the floor, appearing again on the construction site, with the name "FIESTAR" imprinted on the floor. During the final chorus, confetti is shown falling on them, reenacting their group name, and finishing the song on the rooftop.

There are five dance settings featured in the video. The first one is the construction site, second is the funky room, followed by the neon room, and then on the rooftop with the background is bunch of distorted letter "A"s, then again, on the construction site, only being nighttime, and a sign reading "I LOEN U", appears beside the dance set.

== Release ==
The song was originally first performed by the group in Music Bank on November 9, 2012, and then to Music Core on November 10, 2012. During this times, Fiestar's leader, Jei, is shooting a love reality show entitled "The Romantic & Idol". They also performed on SBS Jongshim Love Sharing Concert on November 11, 2012.

== Track listing ==
No.	Title	Lyrics	Music	Arrangement	Length
1.	"We Don't Stop"	Shin Hyuk, D'day, Jasmine Kearse, Brittani White	DK, Shin Hyuk, Edward Ross Lara	Shin Hyuk, Edward Ross Lara	3:28
2.	"Sweet Love" (featuring Kim Yeon-woo)	Texu	Texu	Texu	3:47
Total length:					7:15

== Chart performance ==
=== Singles chart ===
Title	Peak positions	
Title	KOR Gaon	KOR Billboard
"We Don't Stop"	66	58
"Sweet Love" (Feat. Kim Yeon-woo)	70	99
"—" denotes releases that did not chart or were not released in that region.

=== Albums chart ===
Chart	Peak position
Gaon Weekly	21
Gaon Monthly	62
"—" denotes releases that did not chart or were not released in that region.

=== Sales and Certifications ===
Chart	Amount
Gaon Physical Sales	1,408+
