= Vista (song) =

Single by Fiestar
- B-side: "Wicked"; "Sea of Moonlight"
- Released: August 31, 2012
- Recorded: 2012
- Genre: Dance-pop
- Length: 3:36
- Label: LOEN Entertainment
- Songwriters: Kim Eana, KZ

Fiestar singles chronology
"Vista" (2012)	"We Don't Stop" (2012)

Music video
- "Vista" on YouTube

"Vista" is the debut single by South Korean girl group Fiestar. The single was released on August 31, 2012, by LOEN Entertainment.

== History ==
LOEN Entertainment confirmed that they will be releasing a six-member girl group coming from various countries. It is confirmed later when they released teasers of Yezi and Cheska's raps, along with the dance cover of SHINee's Lucifer by the group.

Before the group's debut, they released a collaborative song with IU entitled "Sea of Moonlight". The song charted high on charts, making number 1 at Bugs, Soribada, and Naver; Number 2 at Mnet and Olleh; and number 5 at Melon. They confirmed that the group's name will be Fiestar, a combination of Fiesta + Star. They released the music video on July 26, 2012.

One week before their debut, Fiestar collaborates with Tiger JK to release "Wicked", a song influenced by electronic house music and reggaeton combined. The song also charted at number 57 at Gaon and number 71 at Billboard, showing their popularity before their debut. The song is released digitally on August 23, 2012.

== Music video ==
The music video starts in a supernatural world, with superheroes living in this world. Yezi is shown having the ability to teleport, Cao Lu has super speed, and Linzy has the ability to fly. Hyemi watches a commercial by JYJ's Junsu for a product called Super Spray. Meanwhile, in the same room, Cheska is seen testing her jetpack (which fails), and writes calculations and formulas on a board. Jei goes to Vista, an audition show, and is shown seating with Sunny Hill's Seungah reprising her role as Wonder Woman. The song now begins, showing various auditions, and the other members arrive to help Jei. It is also revealed that JYJ's Junsu is Superman. After the audition, Fiestar wins the show, continuing their popularity. Cheska flies to the screen, and appears again on the dance scene where their group name is written in the background. After the song finishes, the girls vanish from the screen.

There are two dance settings featured in the video. The first one is an attic with their group's name as the background, and the second one is the stage of Vista's auditioning show.

== Release ==
The song was originally first performed by the group in Music Core on September 1, 2012, and then to Inkigayo on September 2, 2012. The album became a hit, and entering the Billboard's Hot 100, peaking at number 27, and also their other songs, Wicked at number 71, and Sea of Moonlight entering the Hot 10, with its peak at number 10. They ended their promotions at Inkigayo on October 14, 2012.

== Track listing ==
No.	Title	Lyrics	Music	Arrangement	Length
1.	"Vista"	Kim Eana	KZ	KZ	3:31
2.	"Wicked" (featuring Tiger JK)	Kim Eana, Texu, Tiger JK, Red Roc	Texu	Kim Eana	3:40
3.	"Sea of Moonlight" (달빛바다; Dalbitbada) (Fiestar version)	Kim Eana	Psyturned, Tae Bong-in	Psyturned, Tae Bong-in	3:29
Total length:					10:40

== Chart performance ==
=== Singles chart ===
Title	Peak positions	
Title	KOR Gaon	KOR Billboard
"Sea of Moonlight"	12	10
"Vista"	27	28
"Wicked" (Feat. Tiger JK)	57	71
"—" denotes releases that did not chart or were not released in that region.

=== Albums chart ===
Chart	Peak position
Gaon Weekly	9
Gaon Monthly	40
Mnet	14
"—" denotes releases that did not chart or were not released in that region.

=== Sales and Certifications ===
Chart	Amount
Gaon Physical Sales	1,920+
