= I Don't Know (Fiestar song) =

Single by Fiestar
- B-side: "Head, Shoulders, Knee, Foot"
- Released: November 1, 2013
- Recorded: 2013
- Genre: Dance-pop
- Length: 3:45
- Label: LOEN Entertainment
- Songwriter: Shinsadong Tiger

Fiestar singles chronology
"We Don't Stop" (2012)	"I Don't Know" (2013)	"One More" (2014)

"I Don't Know" (아무것도 몰라요) is a song by South Korean girl group, Fiestar, from their third single album, Curious. It's their first single after a 1-year hiatus. The single was released on November 1, 2013, by LOEN Entertainment, with the title track 'I Don't Know'. This is also their first single under LOEN's music label, Collabodadi., It was also the last single release with former member Cheska had left the group in 2014.

== Background ==
Fiestar said on LOEN's I'M Interview that their "I Don't Know" is about a naive woman who doesn't know how to love and is so picked on because shes a woman who just wants a man to love but she decides to become independently wealthy.

== Music video ==
The music video stars the leader, Jei, and two Gag Concert team members, and also a cameo by main rapper Yezi. The story starts on a guy's room, then the doorbell rangs. The guy opens it, and his girlfriend Jei appears. As she enters, her boyfriend asks him to remove his jacket. As she removes her jacket, her boyfriend stares on her breasts, and thinks about lewd things which was portrayed by his furnitures, such as Pinocchio growing his long nose. As they're playing a game, her character Yezi is almost losing, then the guy's character is about to win but as he looks down on Yezi's breasts, the girl took an opportunity and beats her boyfriend's character, who forgot to play since he's staring at his girlfriend's breasts. As the two celebrates, the couple had an awkward moment and the boyfriend tried to kiss his girlfriend, which she refuses. The guy forces it until the girl left the room. As the guy's desperation came to an end, he turns on the television and sees his girlfriend, and begins to think of dirty things again, and the video ends the girls turn away to the right beside the soldiers.

There are four dance settings on this video: the black-and-white television, and the fun fantasy background with a marching band as backdancers. The other two settings are not really dance settings, but rather a song setting, since in the bridge part of the song, there are two settings: the lead singer Hyemi singing to a seemingly night-time version of the fun fantasy background, and the visual and leader Jei singing on the backdoor of her girlfriend's room.

== Release ==
The song was originally first performed by the group in Music Core on November 2, 2013. The single ranked 4 places higher than their previous single, "We Don't Stop", from 21 to 17, but was still not enough to beat their debut single which peaked at rank 9.

== Track listing ==
No.	Title	Lyrics	Music	Arrangement	Length
1.	"Intro (....Fantasy)"		Shinsadong Tiger		0:55
2.	"I Don't Know (아무것도 몰라요)"	Shinsadong Tiger	Shinsadong Tiger	KZ	3:45
3.	"Head, Shoulders, Knee, Foot (머리 어깨 무릎 발)"	Kim Eana	Shinsadong Tiger		3:49
4.	"I Don't Know (R.Tee Remix) (아무것도 몰라요)"	Shinsadong Tiger	Shinsadong Tiger		3:27
Total length:					11:56

== Chart performance ==
=== Singles chart ===
Title	Peak positions	
Title	KOR Gaon	KOR Billboard
"I Don't Know"	63	63
"Head, Shoulders, Knee, Foot"	57	92
"—" denotes releases that did not chart or were not released in that region.

=== Albums chart ===
Chart	Peak position
Gaon Weekly	17
Gaon Monthly	63
"—" denotes releases that did not chart or were not released in that region.
