= Fiestar =

South Korean girl group

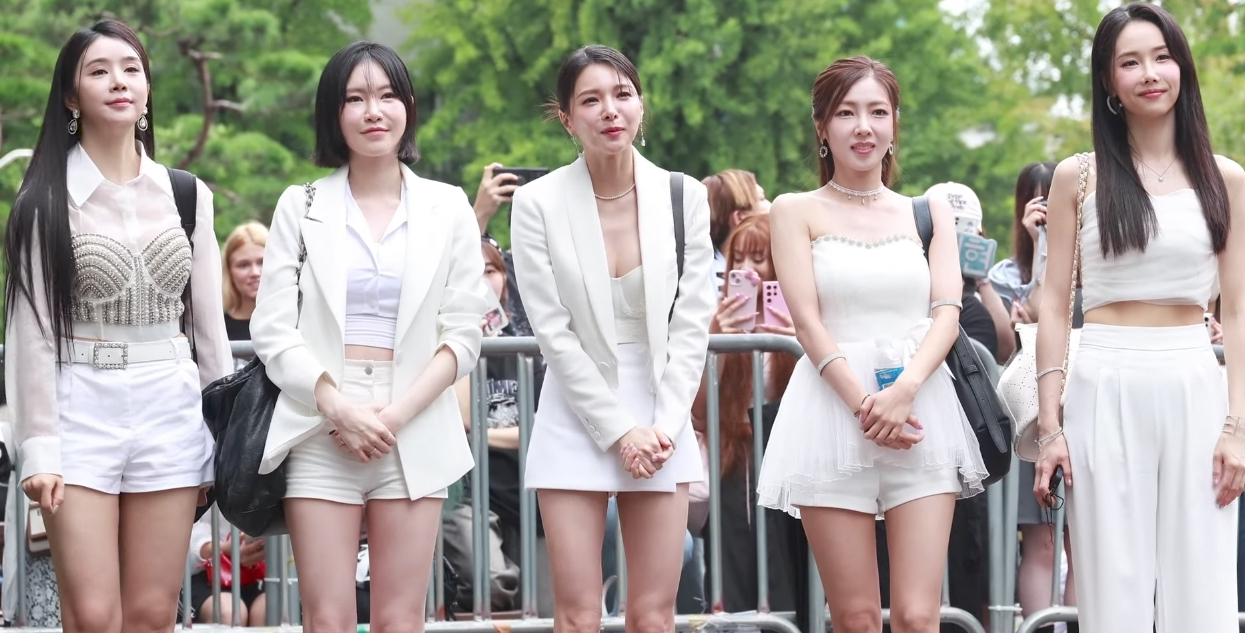
- Fiestar in September 2024. L-R: Cao Lu, Yezi, Jei, Hyemi, Linzy

Background information
- Origin: Seoul, South Korea
- Genre: K-pop
- Years active: 2012–2018; 2024–present
- Labels: Kakao M; Bomnal
- Members: Cao Lu; Jei; Linzy; Hyemi; Yezi
- Past members: Cheska
- Website: www.bomnal-ent.com/피에스타

Fiestar (Korean: 피에스타) is a South Korean girl group, composed of Cao Lu, Jei, Linzy, Hyemi and Yezi. They began their career prior to debut by releasing a duet with label mate IU titled "Sea of Moonlight" in July 2012 for LOEN Entertainment's collective label album and later gained domestic success after entering the top ten of the Gaon Digital Chart. The group later debuted on August 31, 2012, with the single "Vista" and concluded their career in May 2018 after four members decided not to renew their contracts with the label.

On August 27, 2024, Fiestar announced they would reunite to release a single on August 31 to celebrate their 12th anniversary debut. The group released their first independent single, "You're Pitiful", a remake version from their first EP Black Label (2015).

On April 9, 2025, Bomnal Entertainment announced that the members of Fiestar signed an exclusive contract with their company. On August 28, Cao Lu released a video titled "Fiestar's contract ended after 6 months and will released song 'Vista' with investment from Cao Lu.

== History ==
=== Pre-debut ===
In July 2012, LOEN Entertainment announced it would be debuting a six-member girl group named Fiestar in August. The group members, who came from South Korea, China, and the United States, had trained together for two years and individually for an average of four years.

The oldest member, Cao Lu, had previously debuted as a soloist in China after winning a 2004 CCTV singing contest.

The group's leader, Jei, had modeled for online clothing stores and appeared in the music video for Infinite's 2011 single "Paradise".

Linzy had been a trainee under YG Entertainment and was reportedly intended to be a member of the group 2NE1. In 2010, she recorded a song for the Korean drama Obstetrics and Gynecology.

Cheska, who is Korean American, auditioned for JYP Entertainment in 2008, but did not join the company due to opposition from her parents. She was later discovered by Kim Chang-hwan, the producer behind Clon and Kim Gun-mo, who convinced her parents to let her come to South Korea.

Yezi started her career as a backup dancer for singers Park Mi-kyung and Hong Kyung-min.

=== 2012–2013: Debut and further releases ===
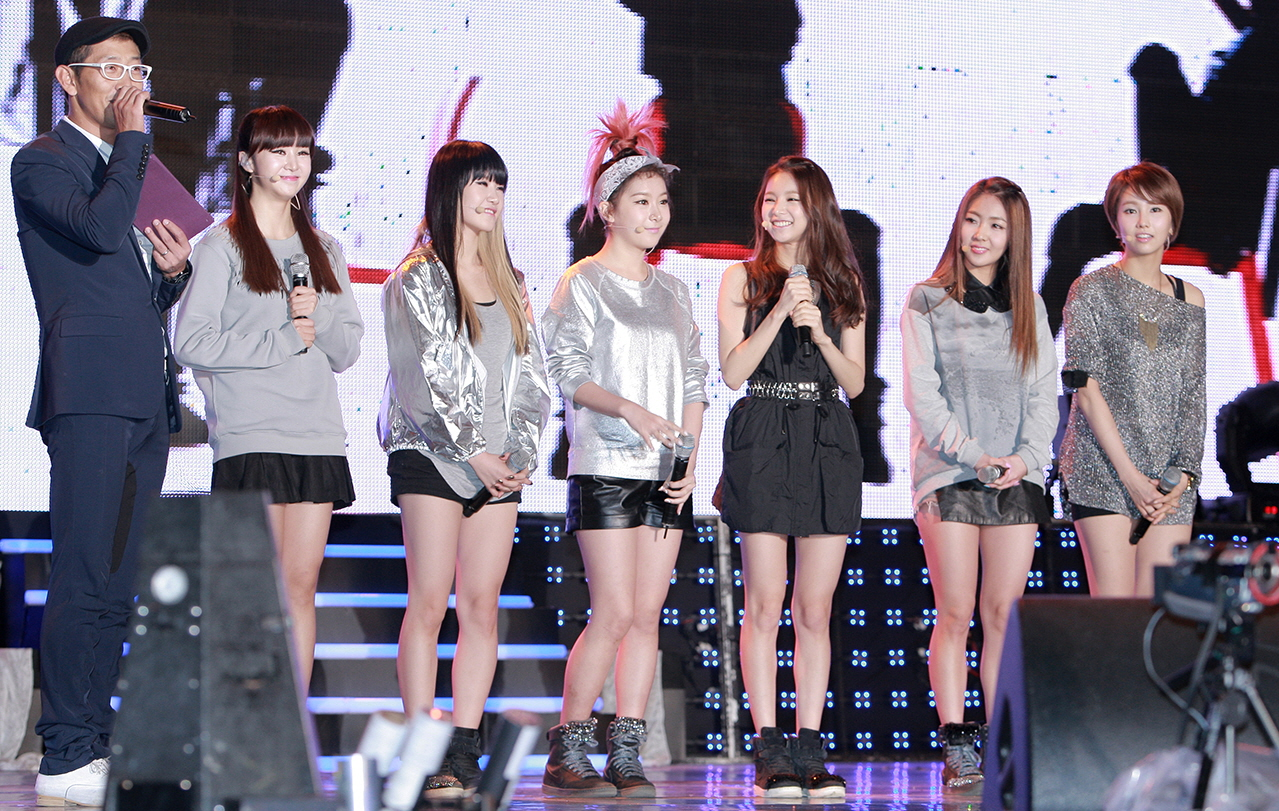
Fiestar in October 2012

Before their official debut, Fiestar released a duet with label mate IU for LOEN Entertainment's collective label album. The track was titled "Sea of Moonlight" and was a domestic chart success. They also collaborated with Tiger JK for the pre-release song "Wicked".

The group released their first official single, "Vista", on August 31, 2012. The tracks from the corresponding EP all charted on the K-pop Billboard Hot 100.

Fiestar's second single "We Don't Stop" was released on November 9, with the B-side track "Sweet Love" featuring ballad singer Kim Yeon-woo. Live promotions for the album began on Music Bank the following day. Alongside group promotions, Jei appeared in TVN's reality program Romantic and Idol, and alongside IU for the comedy show Gag Concert along with Jei, Cao Lu and Linzy. Vocalists Linzy and Hyemi appeared on KBS's 1000 Song Challenge, and the group as a whole made appearances on Weekly Idol and Dream Team 2. They also endorsed HIM Magazine.

In 2013, Linzy played Sharpay Evans in the CJE&M Korean musical adaptation of High School Musical, sharing the role with The Grace's Dana. The show began on July 2 at the Blue Square Samsung Card Hall. The same year, Fiestar also participated in a video series entitled "Fiestar's A-HA! For the Global K-Pop Fan" as well as endorsements for the Samsung Galaxy S4.

On August 27, a pre-release single, "Whoo!" featuring Eric Benét, was released online. Despite there being no live promotions for the single, it was a chart success.

In September, LOEN Entertainment created the sub-label Collabodadi, under which Fiestar would continue to release their music. On November 1, the group released the single "I Don't Know" on the EP Curious, making their stage comeback on Music Core the following day. Following promotions, the reality television show Channel FIESTAR! aired on SBS MTV.

=== 2014–2015: Cheska's departure and Black Label ===
On March 20, 2014, LOEN Entertainment announced that Cheska would be leaving the group and would not be replaced by any new members, and Fiestar's comeback was scheduled for mid-July after being postponed due to the Sewol ferry tragedy.

On June 16, a single in collaboration between The Friends and Fiestar for the 2014 Brazil World Cup titled "I Love Korea" was released. On July 1, the music video for the single "One More" was released.

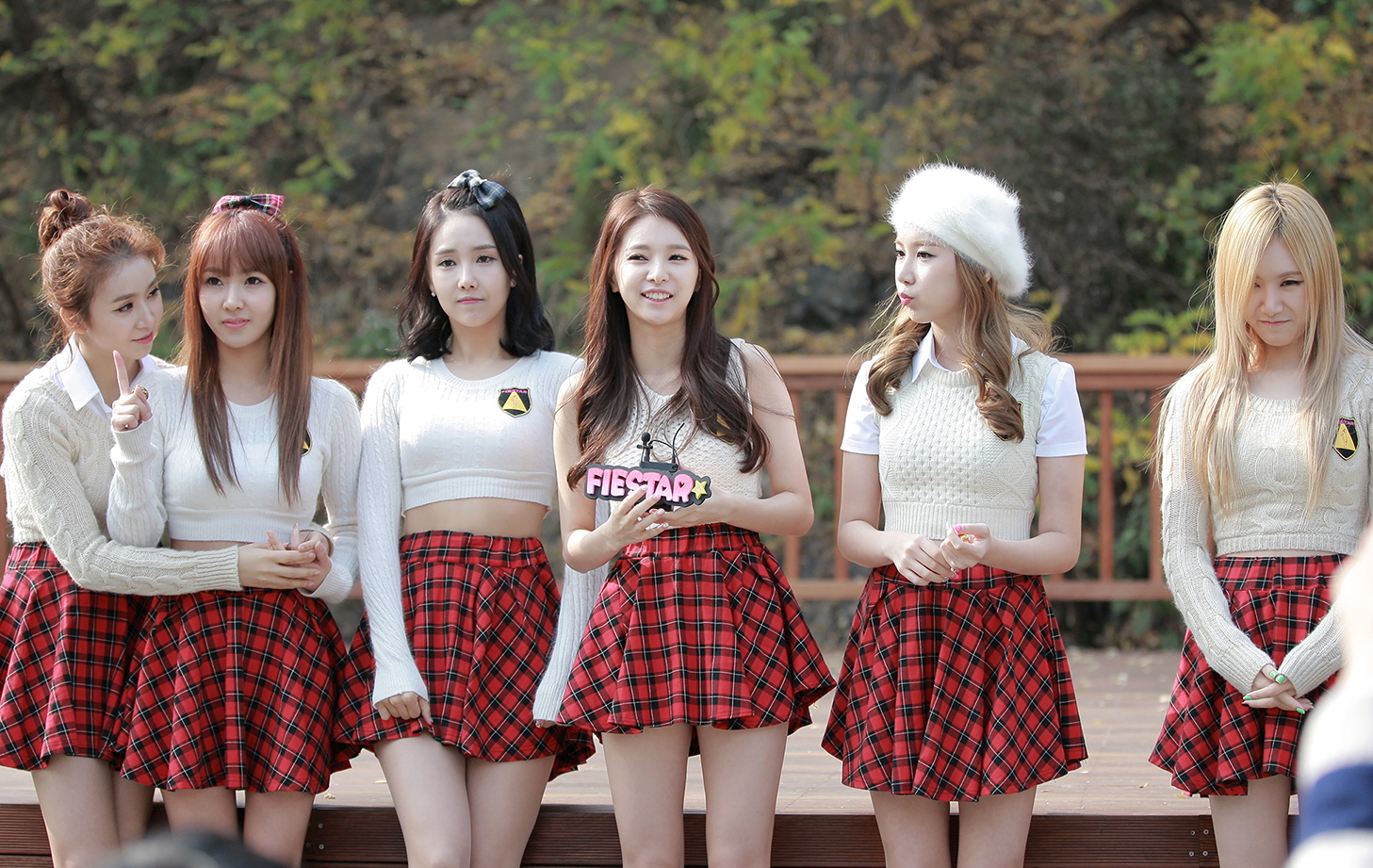
Fiestar in January 2014

On March 4, 2015, Fiestar's first EP, Black Label, was released with the title track "You're Pitiful". Six months after the album's release, on September 22, Collabodadi was dissolved, with LOEN Tree becoming the sole in-house label of LOEN Entertainment. Thus, Fiestar returned to LOEN Tree after a two-year run under Collabodadi.

On December 17, Cao Lu appeared on Radio Star as a guest along with rapper Jessi, Got7's Jackson, and Lena Park as part of the Outsiders special. She gained national attention for her appearance on the program and became the number one trending topic on Naver, with Fiestar also trending.

=== 2016–2018: Last activities and disbandment ===
In March 2016, Fiestar released their second EP A Delicate Sense. The album consists of six tracks, including lead single "Mirror". Notably, all the members also participated in the production.

On May 31, 2016, Fiestar returned with the digital single "Apple Pie".

On May 15, 2018, after a year of no group activities, it was announced that Fiestar had officially disbanded following the expiration of four of the members' contracts on April 30 and Cao Lu's contract would be expiring on May 31.

On May 29, 2018, former member Cheska announced via her Instagram that she was leaving Korea and quitting music. She thanked her fans for supporting her, but stated that she decided to walk away as "music was slowly killing [her]".

=== 2024–present: Reunion and new label ===
On August 27 it was reported that Fiestar would reunite with the release of a new song on August 31 to commemorate their 12th debut anniversary. On August 29, Fiestar appeared together on Cao Lu's YouTube channel and confirmed that they would reunite with the release of a remake of their 2015 single "You're Pitiful", their first independent release. Cao Lu also cited that the single's copyright was already bought by her. Their remake single "You're Pitiful" was officially released on August 31, with a new style which combined "UK Garage" and "Rage Pop" genres.

On April 9, 2025, it was reported that Fiestar signed an exclusive contract with Bomnal Entertainment and preparing a remake album to share memories with their fans and will perform on stage at the Kpop Super Concert in Macau on April 27. On August 28, 2025, it was reported Cao Lu posted a video through her YouTube channel that Fiestar's contract terminated with Bomnal on July 31 after 6 months and she announced that the song 'Vista' which was arranged and recorded will be released on the 31st, marking the 13th anniversary of her debut.

== "One More" controversy ==
Fiestar's single "One More" was banned from broadcast by MBC for its supposedly risqué lyrics. While the song had originally passed scrutiny from the three major broadcasting stations (KBS, MBC and SBS), backlash from public commentators forced the networks to review the song's content. While their representatives claimed that the song was innocuous, the group re-recorded the song and changed the lyrics. The controversy spawned from the lyrics prompted MBC to crack down further on songs with ambiguous or easily misconstrued lyrical content.

== Members ==
Current

- Cao Lu (차오루)
- Jei (재이) - Leader
- Linzy (린지)
- Hyemi (혜미)
- Yezi (예지)

Former

- Cheska (체스카)

== Discography ==
=== Extended plays ===
Title	Album details	Peak positions	Sales
Title	Album details	KOR	Sales
Black Label	Released: March 4, 2015; Label: LOEN Entertainment; Format: CD, digital download	11	KOR: 3,021
A Delicate Sense	Released: March 9, 2016; Label: LOEN Entertainment; Format: CD, digital download; Track listing: 1. A Sip In Your Lips; 2. Mirror; 3. Mr. Black; 4. Thirst; 5. Come And Go; 6. Mirror (instr.)	9	KOR: 3,060

=== Singles ===
Title	Year	Peak chart positions			Sales (Note: Sales figures for tracks are based on digital downloads, except noted.)	Album
Title	Year	KOR Gaon		KOR Hot	Sales	Album
Title	Year	Digital	Album	KOR Hot	Sales	Album
"Sea of Moonlight" (with IU)	2012	12	—N/a	10	KOR: 1,004,426	LOEN Tree Summer Story
"Vista"	2012	27	9	28	KOR (Phy.): 1,920; KOR: 350,922	Vista (single)
"We Don't Stop"	2012	66	21	58	KOR (Phy.): 1,408; KOR: 107,083	We Don't Stop (single)
"Whoo! " (with Eric Benét)	2013	58	—N/a	80	KOR: 30,599	Non-album single
"I Don't Know"	2013	63	17	63	KOR (Phy.): 1,629; KOR: 72,042	Curious (single)
"One More"	2014	51	—N/a	57	KOR: 73,668	Non-album single
"You're Pitiful"	2015	60	—N/a	—N/a	KOR: 65,454	Black Label
"Mirror"	2016	80	—N/a	—N/a	KOR: 47,100	A Delicate Sense
"Apple Pie"	2016	84	—N/a	—N/a	KOR: 39,118	Non-album singles
"You're Pitiful 2024 ver."	2024	TBA	—N/a	—N/a	—N/a	Non-album singles
Note: The Billboard K-Pop Hot 100 was introduced in August 2011 and was discontinued in July 2014.

=== Other charted songs ===
Title	Year	Peak chart positions		Sales	Album
Title	Year	KOR Gaon	KOR Hot	Sales	Album
"Wicked" (feat. Tiger JK)	2012	57	71	KOR: 85,571	Vista (single)
"Sweet Love" (feat. Kim Yeon-woo)	2012	70	—	KOR: 69,762	We Don't Stop (single)
"—" denotes releases that did not chart or were not released in that region.

=== Soundtrack appearances ===
Title	Year	Album
"So Tight"	2014	My Lovely Girl OST Part 7
"Miraculous Ladybug"	2015	Miraculous Ladybug OST
"Save Me Tarzan"	2015	Golden Tower OST Part 1
"#Like"	2016	Centerpole OST

=== Other appearances ===
Title	Year	Album
"Such A Woman" (by Zia)	2014	Such A Woman (repackage album)

== Videography ==
=== Music videos ===
Year	Song title	Album	Released	Length	Director/Production House	Notes
2012	"Sea of Moonlight" (with IU)	LOEN Tree Summer Story	July 26	3:43	Hwang Soo-ah (LOEN Entertainment In-house / Film Production Korea)	Special collaboration
2012	"Vista"	Vista	August 31	5:11	Hwang Soo-ah (LOEN Entertainment In-house / Film Production Korea)	Debut music video.
2012	"Vista (Performance Ver.)"	Vista	September 4	3:34	Hwang Soo-ah (LOEN Entertainment In-house / Film Production Korea)	
2012	"We Don't Stop"	We Don't Stop	November 8	3:40	Jo Soo-hyun	
2013	"I Don't Know"	Curious	October 31	3:46	Kim Young-jo, Yoo Jun-seok (Naive Creative Production)	
2014	"I Love Korea"	-	June 16	6:27		World Cup cheering song
2014	"One More"	One More (single)	July 1	3:18	Seong Won-mo, Park Sang-woo (Digital Pedicure)	First official release without Cheska
2015	"You're Pitiful"	Black Label	March 4	3:57	Lee Gi-baek (Tiger Cave Studio)	
2016	"Mirror"	A Delicate Sense	March 9	3:59	Hong Won-ki (zanybros)	
2016	"Apple Pie"	Apple Pie (single)	May 30	4:05	Hong Won-ki (zanybros)	

== Awards and nominations ==
Year presented, name of the award ceremony, award category and the result of the nomination
Year	Awards	Category	Result
2012	4th Annual Seoul Success Awards	Best Rookie of the Year	Won
2012	2012 Arirang's Simply K-Pop Awards	Super Rookie Idol of the Year	Won
2012	All the Kpop - World-Class Rookie Awards	Rookie of the Year	Won
2012	All the Kpop - World-Class Rookie Awards	Knock-Out Award	Won
2012	22nd Seoul Music Awards	Rookie of the Year Award	Nominated
2012	22nd Seoul Music Awards	Popularity Award	Nominated
2015	25th Seoul Music Awards	Bonsang Award	Nominated
2015	25th Seoul Music Awards	Popularity Award	Nominated
