= Those Who Cross the Line =

South Korean television program

- Also known as: On the Border; The Guys Who Cross the Line
- Hangul: 선을 넘는 녀석들
- RR: Seoneul neomneun nyeoseokdeul
- MR: Sŏnŭl nŏmnŭn nyŏsŏktŭl
- Genre: Reality television Travel documentary
- Starring: Various artistes
- Country of origin: South Korea
- Original language: Korean
- No. of seasons: 4
- No. of episodes: 125 (list of episodes)

Production
- Production locations: Season 1: Mexico, United States, France, Germany, Jordan, Israel-Palestine, Spain, Gibraltar, Morocco, Portugal, Italy, Slovenia; Season 2: South Korea, Japan; Season 3: South Korea, Russia, China, Saipan, Tinian; Season 4: South Korea
- Camera setup: Multi-camera
- Running time: 60–90 minutes
- Production company: MBC

Original release
- Network: MBC TV
- Release: 30 March 2018 – 22 December 2021

Those Who Cross the Line (Korean: 선을 넘는 녀석들) is a South Korean television entertainment program and televised on MBC.

Season 1 was aired every Friday, starting 30 March and ending on 14 September 2018.

Season 2 was aired every Saturday, starting 16 February and ending on 23 March 2019.

Season 3 was aired every Sunday, starting 18 August 2019 and ending on 13 December 2020.

Season 4 was aired every Sunday, starting 25 April 2021 with a new master and another guest as X. It was changed to Wednesday as of 1 December 2021 and the show ended on 22 December 2021.

== Overview ==
=== Season 1 ===
The program is a 20-episode series program that compares and contrasts different histories, cultures, and arts as if they resemble the two nations facing the border. It is a new concept that takes away from everyday life that can only be felt locally to a unique history. The program was originally a 16 episodes series but got extended due to its popularity.

=== Season 2 ===
The second season, Those who cross the line - Korean Peninsula (선을 넘는 녀석들 - 한반도편; Seoneul neomneun nyeoseokdeul - Hanbandopyeon), is a 6-episode series program that compares and contrasts on the history of Korean Peninsula and to commemorate the 100th anniversary of March First Movement and Provisional Government. This second season is based on the success of the first season and Seol Min-seok's wishes to visit/cross the Military Demarcation Line (MDL) as mentioned in the opening premier of the Season 2 when the five cast members met. Before visiting the MDL, the cast will learn about the history of Korean Peninsula, particularly on the topics on "Those who tried to protect their borders" from history teacher, Seol Min-seok and invited guests.

=== Season 3 ===
The third season, Those who cross the line - Returns (선을 넘는 녀석들 리턴즈; Seoneul neomneun nyeoseokdeul riteonjeu), is the continuation with the success of the Season 2 and is to visit the hidden historical sites all over South Korea. The excitement is the journey to find the true story that cannot be learned from history books. Furthermore, it is expected that it will make a meaningful move that draws together the stories of yesterday, today, and tomorrow that we have not known yet. In addition, invited guests will visit each historical site to make the Korean history exploration more enriching and enjoyable.

=== Season 4 ===
The fourth season, Those Who Cross the Line – Master X (선을 넘는 녀석들 : 마스터-X; Seoneul neomneun nyeoseokdeul : Maseuteo-X), returned with an expanded format that combines history with other fields of knowledge. Episodes are built around weekly pairings, such as History vs Science, History vs Psychology and History vs Art.

== Airtime ==
Season	Airdate	Broadcast Start Time (KST)	
1	30 March – 14 September 2018	Fridays at 9:50 pm	
2	16 February – 23 March 2019	Part 1	Saturdays at 6:25 pm
2	16 February – 23 March 2019	Part 2	Saturdays at 7:10 pm
3	18 August 2019 – 13 December 2020	Part 1	Sundays at 9:05 pm
3	18 August 2019 – 13 December 2020	Part 2	Sundays at 9:50 pm
4	25 April – 21 November 2021	Part 1	Sundays at 9:10 pm
4	25 April – 21 November 2021	Part 2	Sundays at 9:50 pm
4	1 – 22 December 2021	Wednesdays at 9:00 pm	

== Cast ==
=== Season 1 ===
List of cast (season 1) International Border

Name	Episode	Ref/Notes
Kim Gu-ra	Ep. 1 – 20	
Seol Min-seok	Ep. 1 – 20	
Lee Si-young	Ep. 1 – 16	Lee exited from the show after episode 16, as the original filming of the program was for 16 episodes, and she is filming for her new show. Due to the popularity, the program got extended as explained in episode 17 by Kim Gu-ra.

=== Season 2 ===
List of cast (season 2) Korean Peninsula

Name	Episode	Ref/Notes
Jun Hyun-moo	Ep. 1 – 6	
Seol Min-seok	Ep. 1 – 6	
Moon Geun-young	Ep. 1 – 6	
Yoo Byung-jae	Ep. 1 – 6	
Daniel Lindemann	Ep. 1 – 6	

=== Season 3 ===
List of cast (season 3) Returns

Name	Episode	Ref/Notes
Jun Hyun-moo	Ep. 1 – 67	
Yoo Byung-jae	Ep. 1 – 67	
Kim Jong-min (Koyote)	Ep. 1 – 67	
Seol Min-seok	Ep. 1 – 67	

=== Season 4 ===
List of cast (season 4) Master X

Name	Episode	Role	Ref/Notes
Jun Hyun-moo	Ep. 1 – 32	Host	
Yoo Byung-jae	Ep. 1 – 32	Host	
Kim Jong-min (Koyote)	Ep. 1 – 32	Host	
Shim Yong-hwan	Ep. 1 – 32	History Master	
Kim Kyung-il	Ep. 1 – 32	Psychology Master	
Kim Sang-wook	Ep. 1 – 32	Science Master	

== Episodes ==
=== Season 1 ===
List of episodes (season 1) International Border

Episode #	Trip #	Original Airdate Date	Location	Guests	Ref/Notes
1 – 4	1	30 March 2018; 6 April 2018; 13 April 2018; 20 April 2018	Mexico City & Tijuana (Mexico) (30 March - 20 April) + San Diego (United States) (20 April)	Tyler Rasch; Christian Burgos; Yoo Byung-jae	
—	No broadcast on 27 April due to special broadcast of Inter Korea Summit				
5 – 8	2	4 May 2018; 11 May 2018; 18 May 2018; 25 May 2018	Paris & Strasbourg (France) (4 May – 18 May) + Baden-Württemberg & Berlin (Germany) (18 May – 25 May)	Cha Eun-woo (Astro); Daniel Lindemann; Yoo Byung-jae	
—	No broadcast on 1 June due to International Friendly soccer match between South Korea & Bosnia-Herzegovina				
9 – 12	3	8 June 2018; 22 June 2018; 29 June 2018; 13 July 2018	Amman, Jerash, Ma'in Hot Springs & Petra (Jordan) (8 June, 22 June) + Jerusalem & Dead Sea (Israel-Palestine) (29 June, 13 July)	Minho (Shinee); MC Gree	No broadcast on 15 June and 6 July due to 2018 FIFA World Cup matches Live telecast
13 – 16	4	20 July 2018; 27 July 2018; 3 August 2018; 10 August 2018	Barcelona (Spain) (20 July - 3 August) + Gibraltar (British Overseas Territories) (3 August) + Morocco & Portugal (10 August)	P.O (Block B); Lee Su-hyun (AKMU)	Lee Si-young's last trip
17 – 20	5	17 August 2018; 24 August 2018; 7 September 2018; 14 September 2018	Florence, Venice & Trieste (Italy) (17 – 24 August, 7 – 14 September) + Lake Bled (Slovenia) (14 September)	Solbi; Yura (Girl's Day); Yoo Byung-jae	No broadcast on 31 August due to 2018 Asian Games live telecast.

=== Season 2 ===
List of episodes (season 2) Korean Peninsula

Episode #	Original Airdate Date	Location/Place visited	Historical Events	Special Guest(s)	Ref/Notes
1	16 February 2019	Ganghwa Island: Gwangseongbo (광성보) (江華 廣城堡); Samrangseong (강화 삼랑성) (江華 三郞城); Ganghwa Peace Observatory (강화평화전망대) (江华和平观察站)	1871 Korean Campaign; French Campaign against Korea, 1866; 1884 Kapsin Coup	—	
2	23 February 2019	Ganghwa County: Yeunsangun's house of exile; Gyodong Island	First Literati Purge of 1498; Second Literati Purge of 1504; Jungjong coup in 1506	Kim Young-ok	Kim Young-ok talk about her personal experiences in Korea under Japanese rule, Korean War and family reunion with her eldest brother (North Korean) whom she has not seen for 50 years (in 2000) since the start of Korean War.
2	23 February 2019	Jeju Island: Samseonghyeol Shrine (삼성혈); Yeonbukjeong (연북정); Jocheon Monument Street (조천비석거리)	Tonghak Peasant Revolution	—	All the five cast members are together for the first time since the premier opening of the show.
3	2 March 2019	Jeju Island: Songaksan (Jeju) (송악산); Japanese-made Cave Encampment at Sesaloleum (제주 셋알오름 일제 동굴진지); Altteureu Airfield (알뜨르 비행장); Socotra Rock (이어도); Sanbangsan (산방산); Jeongbang Waterfall (정방폭포)	Beopjeongsa Movement; Jeju uprising Hendrick Hamel in the Joseon Korea	Go Doo-shim	
4	9 March 2019	Jeju Island: Jeongbang Waterfall (정방폭포); Yeongmowon (영모원)	Jeju uprising	—	
4	9 March 2019	Tokyo, Japan: The Classic house at Asakasa Prince; Hibiya Park; Ichigaya Prison (Commemorative Tombstone)	Triple Intervention; February 8 Declaration of Independence; Sakuradamon Incident (1932); Kantō Massacre	Choi Hee-seo	
5	16 March 2019	Tokyo, Japan: Tokyo Station	Five Eulsa Traitors; Seven Jeongmi Traitors; 8 pro-Japanese Traitors	—	
5	16 March 2019	Kyoto, Japan: Koryo Museum of Art; Doshisha University - Yun Dong-ju Memorial; Yodo River	Era of Imperialistic Cultural Cleansing	—	
5	16 March 2019	South Korea: Cheorwon County	—	—	
6	23 March 2019	Cheorwon County: Igrl-ri; Labor Party Headquarter (Former North Korea building); Baengmagoji station; Korean Demilitarized Zone; Civilian Control Line; Southern Limit Line; Arrow Head Ridge Guard Post; Military Demarcation Line	Korean War: Battle of Inchon; Hungnam evacuation; Third Battle of Seoul; Battle of Arrow Head Ridge	Kim Ji-yoon (International Political Specialist)	

=== Season 3 ===
List of episodes (season 3) Returns (2019)

Episode #	Original Airdate Date	Location/Place visited/Event	Special Guest(s)	Ref/Notes
1	18 August	Seoul: Gyeongbokgung; Changdeokgung; Jungmyeongjeon	Choi Hee-seo; Yuji Hosaka	
2	25 August	Busan: Taejongdae; Dongnae-eupseong Imjin Warran History Museum at Suan Station of Busan Metro Line 4; Yongdusan Park (Busan Tower); Joseon Tongsinsa	Cho Jin-woong; Sandeul	
3	1 September	Seoul History tour: Chōsen Shrine; Former residence of Resident-General of Korea; Mitsukoshi Department Store; Gyeonggyojang	Choi Hee-seo	
4	8 September	History of Silla (Gyeongju, North Gyeongsang Province): Gyeongju National Museum; Tomb of King Muyeol; Tomb of General Kim Yu-sin; Hwangnyongsa; Tomb of Munmu of Silla; Gameunsa; Gyeongju National Research Institute of Cultural Heritage	Moon Geun-young	
5	15 September	History of Silla (Gyeongju, North Gyeongsang Province): Gyeongju National Museum; Tomb of King Muyeol; Tomb of General Kim Yu-sin; Hwangnyongsa; Tomb of Munmu of Silla; Gameunsa; Gyeongju National Research Institute of Cultural Heritage	Moon Geun-young	
5	15 September	History of Silla (Gyeongju, North Gyeongsang Province): Gyeongju National Museum; Tomb of King Muyeol; Tomb of General Kim Yu-sin; Hwangnyongsa; Tomb of Munmu of Silla; Gameunsa; Gyeongju National Research Institute of Cultural Heritage	Solbi	
6	22 September	Tongyeong, South Gyeongsang Province: Samdo navy; Sebyeonggwan; Hansando	Kim Myung-min; Kim In-kwon	
7	29 September	Imjin War (Jinju, South Gyeongsang Province): Jinjuseong; Namhae Yi Sunshin Sunguk Park	Lee Jin-hyuk (UP10TION)	
8	6 October	Baekje Historic Areas (Gongju & Buyeo County, South Chungcheong Province and Iksan, North Jeolla Province): Songsan-ri Ancient Tombs; Buyeo Jeongnimsaji; Buyeo National Museum (ft. Gilt-bronze Incense Burner of Baekje and Geumdong Guanyin Bodhisattva statue); Baekje Cultural Land; Nakhwaam Stone; Mireuksaji Stone Pagoda; Iksan Wanggung-ri ruins	Park Chan-ho; Mijoo (Lovelyz)	
9	13 October	Baekje Historic Areas (Gongju & Buyeo County, South Chungcheong Province and Iksan, North Jeolla Province): Songsan-ri Ancient Tombs; Buyeo Jeongnimsaji; Buyeo National Museum (ft. Gilt-bronze Incense Burner of Baekje and Geumdong Guanyin Bodhisattva statue); Baekje Cultural Land; Nakhwaam Stone; Mireuksaji Stone Pagoda; Iksan Wanggung-ri ruins	Park Chan-ho; Han Sun-hwa	
10	20 October	Panmunjom: Events and history of Joint Security Area	Lee Jin-hyuk (UP10TION); Park Yeon-kyung	
11	27 October	Panmunjom: Events and history of Joint Security Area	Lee Jin-hyuk (UP10TION); Park Yeon-kyung	
12	3 November	Veritable Records of the Joseon Dynasty (Odaesan, Pyeongchang): Odaesansago National History Archives; Woljeongsa; Sangwonsa Temple	Jeon In-hwa	
13	10 November	Trans–Siberian Railway (Vladivostok, Russia): Ussuriysk; Oversea Independence Movement in Vladivostok	Choi Hee-seo	
14	17 November	Trans–Siberian Railway (Vladivostok, Russia): Ussuriysk; Oversea Independence Movement in Vladivostok	Choi Hee-seo	
15	24 November	Danjong of Joseon (Yeongwol, Gangwon Province): Yeongwol Seondol; King Danjong's residence during exile; Jagyuru and Gwanpungheon; Tomb of King Danjong; Changjeolsa	Jeong Yu-mi	
16	1 December	Danjong of Joseon (Yeongwol, Gangwon Province): Yeongwol Seondol; King Danjong's residence during exile; Jagyuru and Gwanpungheon; Tomb of King Danjong; Changjeolsa	Jeong Yu-mi	
17	8 December	Korean Independence Movement (Shanghai, China): Provisional Government of the Republic of Korea's Temporary Office Building; Yun Bong-gil - Hongkew Park Bombing; Kim Ku's Independence Movement in China	Han Go-eun; Yoon Joo-bin	
18	15 December	Korean Independence Movement (Shanghai, China): Provisional Government of the Republic of Korea's Temporary Office Building; Yun Bong-gil - Hongkew Park Bombing; Kim Ku's Independence Movement in China	Han Go-eun; Yoon Joo-bin; Kim Yong-man (Kim Gu's great grandson)	
19	22 December	Korean Independence Movement (Shanghai, China): Provisional Government of the Republic of Korea's Temporary Office Building; Yun Bong-gil - Hongkew Park Bombing; Kim Ku's Independence Movement in China	Han Go-eun; Yoon Joo-bin; Kim Yong-man (Kim Gu's great grandson)	
19	22 December	Confucian scholars of Andong (Andong, North Gyeongsang Province): Dosan Seowon	Jeong Yu-mi	
—	No new episode on 29 December due to 2019 MBC Entertainment Awards live telecast			

List of episodes (season 3) Returns (2020)

Episode #	Original Airdate Date	Location/Place visited/Event	Special Guest(s)	Ref/Notes
20	5 January	Confucian scholars of Andong (Andong, North Gyeongsang Province): The Korean Studies Institute; Byeongsanseowon Confucian Academy; Yi Yuksa (ft. Poetic work during Korea Independence Movement)	Jeong Yu-mi	
21	12 January	Confucian scholars of Andong (Andong, North Gyeongsang Province): The Korean Studies Institute; Byeongsanseowon Confucian Academy; Yi Yuksa (ft. Poetic work during Korea Independence Movement)	Jeong Yu-mi; Lee Ok-bi	
21	12 January	Busan Exploration Special: Dong-A University Seokdang Museum (ft. Relics excavated from Yangsan Geumjoong); United Nations Memorial Cemetery; Yeongdo Bridge; 40-step stairway (ft. the historical stairway and cultural centre)	Song Hae; Yook Joong-wan	
22	19 January	Busan Exploration Special: Dong-A University Seokdang Museum (ft. Relics excavated from Yangsan Geumjoong); United Nations Memorial Cemetery; Yeongdo Bridge; 40-step stairway (ft. the historical stairway and cultural centre)	Song Hae; Yook Joong-wan	
—	No new episode on 26 January due to New Year Special 2020 Songan Concert telecast.			
23	2 February	Sejong Science Special (Seoul): National Palace Museum of Korea	Kim Sang-wook	
24	9 February	Sejong Science Special (Seoul): National Palace Museum of Korea	Kim Sang-wook	
25	16 February	Provisional Government of the Republic of Korea (Chongqing, China): Yi Dong-nyeong - (ft. Yi Dong-nyeong's residence & the footsteps of the 80th anniversary of the Korean Liberation Army	Han Go-eun	
26	23 February	Provisional Government of the Republic of Korea (Chongqing, China): Yi Dong-nyeong - (ft. Yi Dong-nyeong's residence & the footsteps of the 80th anniversary of the Korean Liberation Army	Han Go-eun	
27	1 March	March First Movement Special (Seoul): Independence movement theme at Anguk Station; Boseongsa (ft. Korean Declaration of Independence); Cheondogyo Central Bridge; Tapgol Park; Seodaemun Prison History Hall	Jeong Yu-mi	
28	8 March	March First Movement Special (Seoul): Independence movement theme at Anguk Station; Boseongsa (ft. Korean Declaration of Independence); Cheondogyo Central Bridge; Tapgol Park; Seodaemun Prison History Hall	Jeong Yu-mi	
28	8 March	Sejong Hangul Special (Seoul): National Hangeul Museum; MBC Sangam-dong Studio (History Golden Bell); Ju Si-gyeong - Standardizing Korean Language; Korean Language Society incident	Ddotty	
29	15 March	Sejong Hangul Special (Seoul): National Hangeul Museum; MBC Sangam-dong Studio (History Golden Bell); Ju Si-gyeong - Standardizing Korean Language; Korean Language Society incident	Ddotty	
30	22 March	Qing invasion of Joseon (Seoul): Changuimun; Namhansanseong; Samjeondo Monument	Kim Kang-hoon	
31	29 March	Qing invasion of Joseon (Seoul): Changuimun; Namhansanseong; Samjeondo Monument	Kim Kang-hoon	
32	5 April	Sukjong of Joseon (Seoul): Seooreung - Royal tomb of the Joseon Dynasty (ft. the tomb of Gyeongneung and Myeongneung); Land Palace	Jeong Yu-mi	
33	12 April	Sukjong of Joseon (Seoul): Seooreung - Royal tomb of the Joseon Dynasty (ft. the tomb of Gyeongneung and Myeongneung); Land Palace	Jeong Yu-mi	
34	19 April	April Revolution: Unification Education Center; April 19 National Democratic Cemetery; Namsan Literature House; Former Namyeong-dong's Anti-Communist Office	Kim In-kwon	
35	26 April	April Revolution: Unification Education Center; April 19 National Democratic Cemetery; Namsan Literature House; Former Namyeong-dong's Anti-Communist Office	Kim In-kwon	
35	26 April	Joseon Dynasty Special - Yeongjo Exploration: Changgyeonggung (ft. Honghwamun (main gate) and Munjeongjeon (council hall)); Jangchungdan Park - Supyogyo Bridge	Rowoon (SF9); Kim Kang-hoon	
36	3 May	Joseon Dynasty Special - Yeongjo Exploration: Changgyeonggung (ft. Honghwamun (main gate) and Munjeongjeon (council hall)); Jangchungdan Park - Supyogyo Bridge	Rowoon (SF9); Kim Kang-hoon	
37	10 May	Joseon Dynasty Special - Jeongjo Exploration: Changdeokgung (ft. Buyongji and Kyujanggak)	Rowoon (SF9); Kim Kang-hoon	
37	10 May	Joseon Dynasty Special - The 1795 Eight Days Parade: Hwaseong Fortress - Janganmun; Hwaseong Haenggung (ft. Sinpoongru, Naknamheon and Bongsudang)	Kim Se-jeong	
38	17 May	Joseon Dynasty Special - The 1795 Eight Days Parade: Hwaseong Fortress - Janganmun; Hwaseong Haenggung (ft. Sinpoongru, Naknamheon and Bongsudang)	Kim Sang-wook	
38	17 May	Joseon Dynasty Special - The 1795 Eight Days Parade: Hwaseong Fortress - Janganmun; Hwaseong Haenggung (ft. Sinpoongru, Naknamheon and Bongsudang)	Kim Se-jeong; Park Yeong-tak	
39	24 May	Dasan Ecological Park: Chŏng Yagyong	Kim Se-jeong; Park Yeong-tak	
39	24 May	Donghak Peasant Revolution	Jeong Yu-mi; Kim Ho-jung	
40	31 May	Donghak Peasant Revolution	Jeong Yu-mi; Kim Ho-jung	
41	7 June	UNESCO World Heritage Special: Jongmyo Shrine; Heojun Museum; Gyeojangbawi	Jun Kwang-ryul	
42	14 June	UNESCO World Heritage Special: Jongmyo Shrine; Heojun Museum; Gyeojangbawi	Jun Kwang-ryul	
42	14 June	Special feature of the 70th anniversary of the Korean War: Namdaemun; Hangang Bridge; War Memorial of Korea	Sung Yu-ri	
43	20 June	Special feature of the 70th anniversary of the Korean War: Namdaemun; Hangang Bridge; War Memorial of Korea	Sung Yu-ri	
43	20 June	Koreans on the battlefield during the Second World War (Saipan): Mount Tapochau	Kim Hye-yoon	
44	27 June	Koreans on the battlefield during the Second World War (Saipan): Mount Tapochau	Kim Hye-yoon	
45	5 July	Koreans on the battlefield during the Second World War (Tinian): Sugar King Park; Last Japanese Command	Kim Hye-yoon	
46	12 July	1st Anniversary Special (Ulleungdo & Dokdo)	Jeong Yu-mi	
47	19 July	1st Anniversary Special (Ulleungdo & Dokdo)	Jeong Yu-mi	
48	26 July	Ancient Korean Social Class System: Korean Folk Village	Alberto Mondi; Shin Ji (Koyote)	
49	2 August	Ancient Korean Social Class System: Korean Folk Village	Alberto Mondi; Shin Ji (Koyote)	
49	2 August	Ancient Korean Social Class System: Seongsu-dong Valley	Kim Se-jeong; Park Yeong-tak	
50	9 August	Museum is alive Special Feature: National Museum of Korea	Han Ji-hye	
51	16 August	Liberation Day: Massacre in Hwaseong, Gyeonggi Province; Pro-Japanese	Choi Hee-seo	
52	23 August	Liberation Day: Massacre in Hwaseong, Gyeonggi Province; Pro-Japanese	Choi Hee-seo	
53	30 August	Jeong Mong-ju and Jeong Do-jeon rivalry: Yeonju flight; Buseoksa Muryangsujeon; The beginning of Joseon	Choi Soo-jong	
54	6 September	Jeong Mong-ju and Jeong Do-jeon rivalry: Yeonju flight; Buseoksa Muryangsujeon; The beginning of Joseon	Choi Soo-jong	
55	13 September	Joseon's last rivalry: Gojong and Heungseon Daewongun: Conflict between the rich; Seokpajeong - villa of Heungseon Daewongun; Unhyeongung - former residence of Heungseon Daewongun; Gojong's new rival emerged; Wongudan	Moon Ga-young	
56	20 September	Joseon's last rivalry: Gojong and Heungseon Daewongun: Conflict between the rich; Seokpajeong - villa of Heungseon Daewongun; Unhyeongung - former residence of Heungseon Daewongun; Gojong's new rival emerged; Wongudan	Moon Ga-young	
57	27 September	The Age of Three Kingdom	Choi Soo-jong	
—	No new episode on 4 October due to Chuseok Special program telecast.			
58	11 October	Joseon's sovereignty	Jin Se-yeon	
59	18 October	100th Anniversary of the Battle of Cheongsanri	Song Il-gook	
60	25 October	100th Anniversary of the Battle of Cheongsanri	Song Il-gook	
61	1 November	Parallel Theory of Plagues	Jin Tae-hyun	
62	8 November	Finding Sisters Who Have Crossed the Line of Prejudice: Gangneung (Shinsaimdang & Heonanseolheon); Hwang Jini	Noh Sa-yeon	
63	15 November	Finding Sisters Who Have Crossed the Line of Prejudice: Gangneung (Shinsaimdang & Heonanseolheon); Hwang Jini	Noh Sa-yeon	
63	15 November	Real Men Special: Goryeo military regime; Sambyeolcho	Jung Tae-woo	
64	22 November	Real Men Special: Goryeo military regime; Sambyeolcho	Jung Tae-woo	
65	29 November	Real Men Special: Goryeo military regime; Sambyeolcho	Jung Tae-woo	
66	6 December	Finding the Secret of Modern History: 10.26 incident; Yeouido Park; 12.12 Military Insurrection	Jin Se-yeon	
67	13 December	Finding the Secret of Modern History: 10.26 incident; Yeouido Park; 12.12 Military Insurrection	Jin Se-yeon	
67	13 December	There is no country for princesses: Princess Deokhye	Park Ha-sun	

=== Season 4 ===
List of episodes (season 4) Master X

Episode #	Original Airdate Date	Collaboration	Theme/Location/Place visited/Event	Guest(s)	Ref/Notes
1	25 April 2021	Psychology	Between the Tyrant and the Seonggun – Yeonsan-gun vs Jeongjo: Seonjeongneung – Changdeokgung; Changdeokgung Secret Garden – Kyujanggak	Kim Kyung-il	
2	2 May 2021	Psychology	Between the Tyrant and the Seonggun – Yeonsan-gun vs Jeongjo: Seonjeongneung – Changdeokgung; Changdeokgung Secret Garden – Kyujanggak	Kim Kyung-il	
3	9 May 2021	Science	The X-Files That Changed the History of the Korean Peninsula: Hwajinpo Castle; Goseong County (Gangwon Province) – Unification Observatory	Kim Sang-wook	
4	16 May 2021	History	Remembrance of 18 May: Chonnam National University; Geumnam-ro; Former Main Building Gwangju Jeollanam-do Office; May 18th National Cemetery	Ihn Yo-han	
5	23 May 2021	Psychology	Spy: Hongjecheon, Bugaksan & Cheongundae	Kim Kyung-il	
6	30 May 2021	Psychology	Vengeance Blood Battle Top Secret Project, Silmido Island, Hell's Island: Silmido	Kim Kyung-il	
7	6 June 2021	Science	Learning Journey No. 1 (Gyeongju - Moonlit Night of Shilla): Gyeongju National Museum; Jjoksaem District; Cheomseongdae	Kim Sang-wook	
8	13 June 2021	Science & Arts	Find the Science Code! (Kookjung Park - Treasure Hunter Edition): National Museum of Korea	Kim Sang-wook	
9	20 June 2021	History & Psychology	Who is this newcomer? Baekbaekgyo Incident: Dongducheon	Kim Kyung-il; Pyo Chang-won	
10	27 June 2021	History	6.25 Special In Search of Hidden Heroes We Didn't Know: Jangseungpo Port; Hungnam evacuation; UN Memorial Park	Kim Sang-wook	
11	4 July 2021	History & Psychology	"I Can Be No. 1" by Na Hye-seok, who wrote the history of the Joseon first	Shim Yong-hwan; Park Jae-yeon	
12	11 July 2021	History & Crime	Korean version of the CSI forensic unit war on crime	Kwon Il-yong	
13	18 July 2021	History & Environment	1 °C warning, the last SOS from the Earth special: Gyeongsin Great Famine	Shim Yong-hwan; Jo Cheon-ho	
—	No new episode from 25 July to 1 August due to live telecast of Tokyo Olympics.				
14	8 August 2021	History & Psychology	Could Be No. 1 Chosun superstar Yoon Shim-deok	Park Jae-yeon	
15	15 August 2021	History	Liberation Day Special: Sohn Ki-jeong, the first Korean gold medalist.	Seo Kyung-duk	
16	22 August 2021	History & Science	Our relics that will overturn the history of the world! "History has been turned upside down"	Shim Yong-hwan; Kim Sang-wook	
17	29 August 2021	History & Psychology	Gyeongsul Gukchi Special: Story of pro-Japanese policemen brutality: Cheonan Independence Hall	Kim Kyung-il	
18	5 September 2021	History & Science	History of the volcanic eruption of Mt. Baekdu	Kim Sang-wook; Shim Yong-hwan	
19	12 September 2021	History & Psychology	Chun Doo-hwan's Samchung re-education camp	Shim Yong-hwan; Kim Kyung-il	
—	No new episode on 19 September due to Chuseok special movie telecast.				
20	26 September 2021	Classic Literature & Pansori	Lee Mongryong and Seong Chunhyang	Lee Bong-geun; Kim Gemma	
21	3 October 2021	History & Drug	History of drugs in Korea	Kim Sang-wook	
22	10 October 2021	History & Science	History of Space Exploration (Go to the Future): Naro Space Center	Kim Sang-wook; Shim Chae-kyung	
23	17 October 2021	History & Science	History of Space Exploration (Go to the Future): Naro Space Center	Kim Sang-wook; Shim Chae-kyung	
23	17 October 2021	History & Terror	9/11 terror and Osama bin Laden	Park Hyun-do; Kim Kyung-il; Kim Sang-wook	
24	24 October 2021	History & Economics	Let's Play, Economy	Kim Dong-hwan; Shim Yong-hwan	
25	31 October 2021	History & Army	Brutality of Deserter Pursuit (DP)	Attorney Park Joon-young	
26	7 November 2021	History & Criminal Psychology	The Age of Assassination	Pyo Chang-won; Park Tae-gyun	
27	14 November 2021	History & Criminal Psychology	The Age of Assassination	Pyo Chang-won; Park Tae-gyun	
28	21 November 2021	Science & Mystery	UFO & Alien	Kim Sang-wook	
—	Change of broadcast schedule to Wednesday starting 1 December.				
29	1 December 2021	History	Joseon Super Heroes - Hong Gil-dong	Kim Gemma; Kim Dahyun	
30	8 December 2021	History	Joseon Super Heroes - Jeon Woo-chi	Kim Gemma; Kim Dahyun	
31	15 December 2021	History	Our Twisted Hero	Song Hyeong-seok; Kim Gemma	
32	22 December 2021	History & Psychology	A precious vote that will change the fate of Korea! <Choice 2022>	Pyo Chang-won; Lee Ji-sun	

== Ratings ==
In the ratings below, the highest rating for the show will be in red and the lowest rating for the show will be in blue for each season or year.

=== Season 1 ===
List of ratings (season 1)

2018		AGB Nielsen (Nationwide)
Episode	Broadcast Date	AGB Nielsen (Nationwide)
1	30 March	3.3%
2	6 April	4.3%
3	13 April	2.9%
4	20 April	4.2%
5	4 May	4.6%
6	11 May	5.8%
7	18 May	4.6%
8	25 May	4.1%
9	8 June	5.7%
10	22 June	5.6%

2018		AGB Nielsen (Nationwide)
Episode	Broadcast Date	AGB Nielsen (Nationwide)
11	29 June	4.6%
12	13 July	4.1%
13	20 July	4.4%
14	27 July	4.1%
15	3 August	3.3%
16	10 August	3.2%
17	17 August	4.2%
18	24 August	5.2%
19	7 September	5.9%
20	14 September	4.7%

=== Season 2 ===
List of ratings (season 2)

The show will be aired in two parts. Only the higher rating of the episode will be shown.

2019		AGB Nielsen (Nationwide)
Episode	Broadcast Date	AGB Nielsen (Nationwide)
1	16 February	6.2%
2	23 February	5.6%
3	2 March	6.5%
4	9 March	6.2%
5	16 March	5.3%
6	23 March	7.8%

=== Season 3 ===
List of ratings (season 3) 2019

The show will be aired in two parts. Only the higher rating of the episode will be shown.

2019		AGB Nielsen (Nationwide)
Episode	Broadcast Date	AGB Nielsen (Nationwide)
1	18 August	4.4%
2	25 August	2.8%
3	1 September	3.0%
4	8 September	4.6%
5	15 September	4.1%
6	22 September	3.9%
7	29 September	4.5%
8	6 October	4.7%
9	13 October	4.6%
10	20 October	5.5%

2019		AGB Nielsen (Nationwide)
Episode	Broadcast Date	AGB Nielsen (Nationwide)
11	27 October	3.9%
12	3 November	4.8%
13	10 November	4.2%
14	17 November	6.6%
15	24 November	5.6%
16	1 December	6.3%
17	8 December	3.5%
18	15 December	3.0%
19	22 December	3.1%

List of ratings (season 3) 2020

The show will be aired in two parts. Only the higher rating of the episode will be shown.

2020		AGB Nielsen (Nationwide)
Episode	Broadcast Date	AGB Nielsen (Nationwide)
20	5 January	4.2%
21	12 January	3.6%
22	19 January	4.1%
23	2 February	3.8%
24	9 February	3.2%
25	16 February	2.8%
26	23 February	3.0%
27	1 March	3.6%
28	8 March	3.6%
29	15 March	2.9%
30	22 March	4.1%
31	29 March	4.1%
32	5 April	6.2%
33	12 April	5.4%
34	19 April	6.9%
35	26 April	5.8%

2020		AGB Nielsen (Nationwide)
Episode	Broadcast Date	AGB Nielsen (Nationwide)
36	3 May	5.5%
37	10 May	5.7%
38	17 May	5.7%
39	24 May	5.0%
40	31 May	4.2%
41	7 June	4.6%
42	14 June	4.4%
43	21 June	4.6%
44	28 June	4.5%
45	5 July	5.2%
46	12 July	5.4%
47	19 July	4.9%
48	26 July	4.7%
49	2 August	3.5%
50	9 August	4.6%
51	16 August	4.0%

2020		AGB Nielsen (Nationwide)
Episode	Broadcast Date	AGB Nielsen (Nationwide)
52	23 August	5.6%
53	30 August	5.5%
54	6 September	5.3%
55	13 September	6.9%
56	20 September	5.2%
57	27 September	6.0%
58	11 October	4.6%
59	18 October	5.1%
60	25 October	4.6%
61	1 November	5.4%
62	8 November	5.9%
63	15 November	6.0%
64	22 November	6.5%
65	29 November	5.9%
66	6 December	8.6%
67	13 December	7.8%

=== Season 4 ===
List of ratings (season 4)

The show will be aired in two parts. Only the higher rating of the episode will be shown.

2021		AGB Nielsen (Nationwide)
Episode	Broadcast Date	AGB Nielsen (Nationwide)
1	25 April	3.7%
2	2 May	3.3%
3	9 May	3.9%
4	16 May	4.0%
5	23 May	3.8%
6	30 May	4.2%
7	6 June	5.1%
8	13 June	3.0%
9	20 June	4.0%
10	27 June	2.9%
11	4 July	3.0%
12	11 July	2.8%
13	18 July	3.3%
14	8 August	2.4%
15	15 August	3.2%
16	22 August	3.1%

2021		AGB Nielsen (Nationwide)
Episode	Broadcast Date	AGB Nielsen (Nationwide)
17	29 August	3.3%
18	5 September	4.8%
19	12 September	3.6%
20	26 September	3.1%
21	3 October	3.5%
22	10 October	2.7%
23	17 October	2.7%
24	24 October	2.9%
25	31 October	3.3%
26	7 November	2.6%
27	14 November	3.1%
28	21 November	2.6%
29	1 December	3.1%
30	8 December	2.7%
31	15 December	2.4%
32	22 December	2.1%

== Awards and nominations ==
Year	Award	Category	Recipient	Result	Ref.
2018	18th MBC Entertainment Awards	Grand Prize (Daesang)	Kim Gu-ra	Nominated	
2018	18th MBC Entertainment Awards	Entertainer of the Year Award	Kim Gu-ra	Won	
2018	18th MBC Entertainment Awards	Top Excellence Award, Variety Category (Female)	Lee Si-young	Nominated	
2018	18th MBC Entertainment Awards	Best Entertainer Award (variety)	Yoo Byung-jae	Won	
2019	19th MBC Entertainment Awards	Program of the Year	Those Who Cross the Line - Returns	Nominated	
2019	19th MBC Entertainment Awards	Excellence Award, Variety Category (Male)	Yoo Byung-jae	Won	
2019	19th MBC Entertainment Awards	Excellence Award, Variety Category (Male)	Kim Jong-min	Nominated	
2019	19th MBC Entertainment Awards	Excellence Award, Variety Category (Female)	Moon Geun-young	Nominated	
2019	19th MBC Entertainment Awards	Special Award, Variety	Seol Min-seok	Won	
2019	19th MBC Entertainment Awards	Entertainer of the Year	Jun Hyun-moo	Won	
2020	20th MBC Entertainment Awards	Program of the Year	Those Who Cross the Line - Returns	Nominated	
2020	20th MBC Entertainment Awards	Excellence Award, Music/Talk Category (Male)	Kim Jong-min	Won	
2020	20th MBC Entertainment Awards	Rookie Award, Variety Category (Male)	Kim Kang-hoon	Won	
2021	21st MBC Entertainment Awards	Entertainer of the Year	Jun Hyun-moo	Won	
2021	21st MBC Entertainment Awards	Best Entertainer Award	Yoo Byung-jae	Won	
2021	21st MBC Entertainment Awards	Popularity Award	Kim Jong-min	Won	

== Controversy ==
=== Season 1 ===
==== Jordanian Image Mistake ====
On 11 June 2018, the production crew of MBC "선을 넘는 녀석들" wrote in the official Instagram that some Jordanian-Israel-Palestine editions broadcast on Friday, 8 June, have pointed out that "the part that used the image of Muhammad as a prophet of Islam and the part that used the rock dome together with the flag of a certain country". The production crew has issued an official apology, in both Korean and English version, for telling people of particular religions and views.

=== Season 3 ===
==== Seol Min-seok's plagiarism of his master's thesis ====
On 30 December 2020, there was a report that Seol Min-seok's thesis on 'A Study on the Ideological Controversy Appearing in Textbooks of Modern and Contemporary Korean History' for which he received his master's degree at the Yonsei University Graduate School of Education in 2010 was 52% plagiarised. Seol admit that in his research in writing the thesis, he neglected citations and footnotes in the process of referencing other papers. Due to the plagiarism allegation, Seol resigned from all the programs he was cast in and MBC decided to end season 3 of the program to reorganise.
