= Flower Crew =

Korean television entertainment program

- Hangul: 꽃놀이패
- RR: Kkonnoripae
- MR: Kkonnorip'ae
- Genre: Reality (live-voting), comedy, travel-variety show
- Directed by: Park Seung-min
- Starring: Various artistes
- Country of origin: South Korea
- Original language: Korean
- No. of episodes: 29 + 2 pilot

Production
- Executive producers: Min Eui-sik; Yang Min-suk
- Producer: Choi Young-in
- Production location: South Korea
- Running time: 90 minutes
- Production companies: YG Entertainment, SBS

Original release
- Network: SBS; NAVER V App (Pilot Episode)
- Release: July 15–16, 2016 (pilot); September 5, 2016 – March 19, 2017

Related
- Running Man, Good Sunday

Flower Crew (Korean: 꽃놀이패) is a South Korean travel-reality show that was formerly broadcast via SBS on Mondays at 23:10 (KST) from September 5 to November 21, 2016. Starting November 27, 2016, it aired every Sunday at 16:50 (KST), before Running Man, forming part of SBS's Good Sunday lineup and ended with its last episode on March 19, 2017.

Flower Crew was first broadcast through the Naver V App as a pilot episode. The regular show starred Seo Jang-hoon, Jo Se-ho, Ahn Jung-hwan, Yoo Byung-jae, Winner's Kang Seung-yoon and Lee Sung-jae. Flower Crew took the cast members on a three-day adventure in which all their decisions were made by viewers of the show. Viewers had the chance to participate in the show through Naver V live broadcast voting.

YG Entertainment decided to partner with broadcasting station SBS to begin airing the new show regularly. From episode 1 of the variety show, the show no longer included Jungkook and Kim Min-seok because of their hectic schedules. To replace them, the producers picked Sechs Kies's Lee Jaijin and Eun Jiwon. Eun Jiwon has been in other variety shows such as New Journey to the West and 2 Days & 1 Night.

== Format ==
As of Episode 1, basically, all members will gathered and will create an activity to determine the Team Flowery Road and Team Muddy Road, followed by picking Golden Transfer Ticket, which is shaped like a golden coin with hole in the middle as written "Flowery Road", same as "Silver Transfer Ticket".

Usually a Guest(s) only participated on the second day for a while to do activities with the members, and sometimes invited at the beginning of trip as Leader of Team Flowery Road for early trip and will participated with members until the end of the trip.

Team Flowery Road receives better accommodation, comfortable vehicles, adequate food, and services provided by the crew during the trip. In contrast, Team Muddy Road stays in dilapidated houses, has limited food supplies, and takes part in different activities.

After a situation of havoc created unintentionally by Lee Jaijin, in one of the latter episodes, the production team created a rule stating that the Transfer Ticket only can be used & only available in same day the Flower Crew members receive or get it from the lucky draw or the guest. It only can be used before midnight at any situation, for anyone & any place.

== Transfer Ticket ==
As in early episode, there are several types of Transfer Ticket in this show as almost every new episode or trip, the staff production keep introduces a new kind of Transfer Ticket to the Flower Crew Member.

The most common one and as the powerful transfer ticket, Golden a.k.a. "Exchange", function as the user can swap or trade House Road with the other member from other house road. The user can switch place from Muddy road to Flower Road and must summon someone from other house to replace the user.

The second and the famous one, Silver a.k.a. "Transfer", function as the user can transfer someone from both House Road to the other house road but he/she cannot use it to him/herself.

== Theme ==
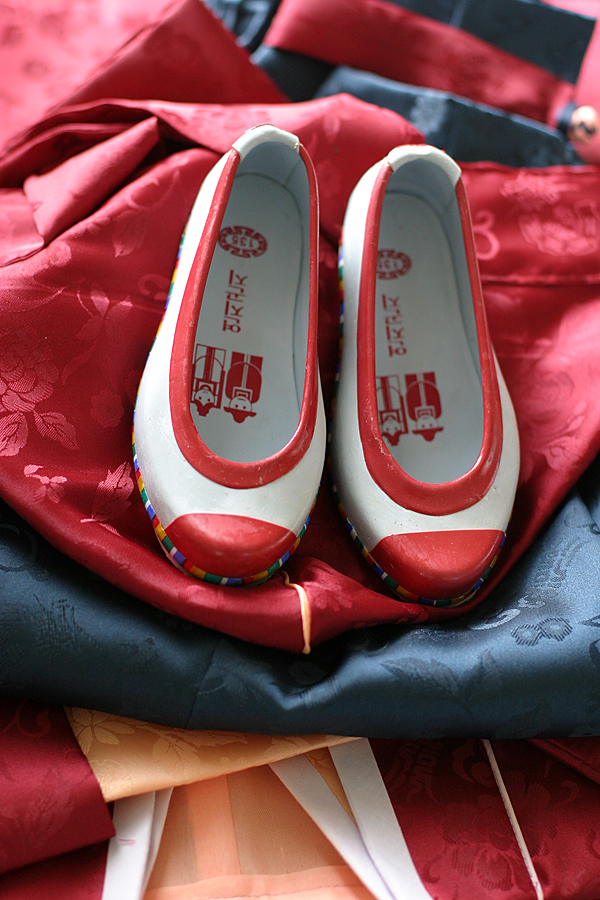
Gomusin

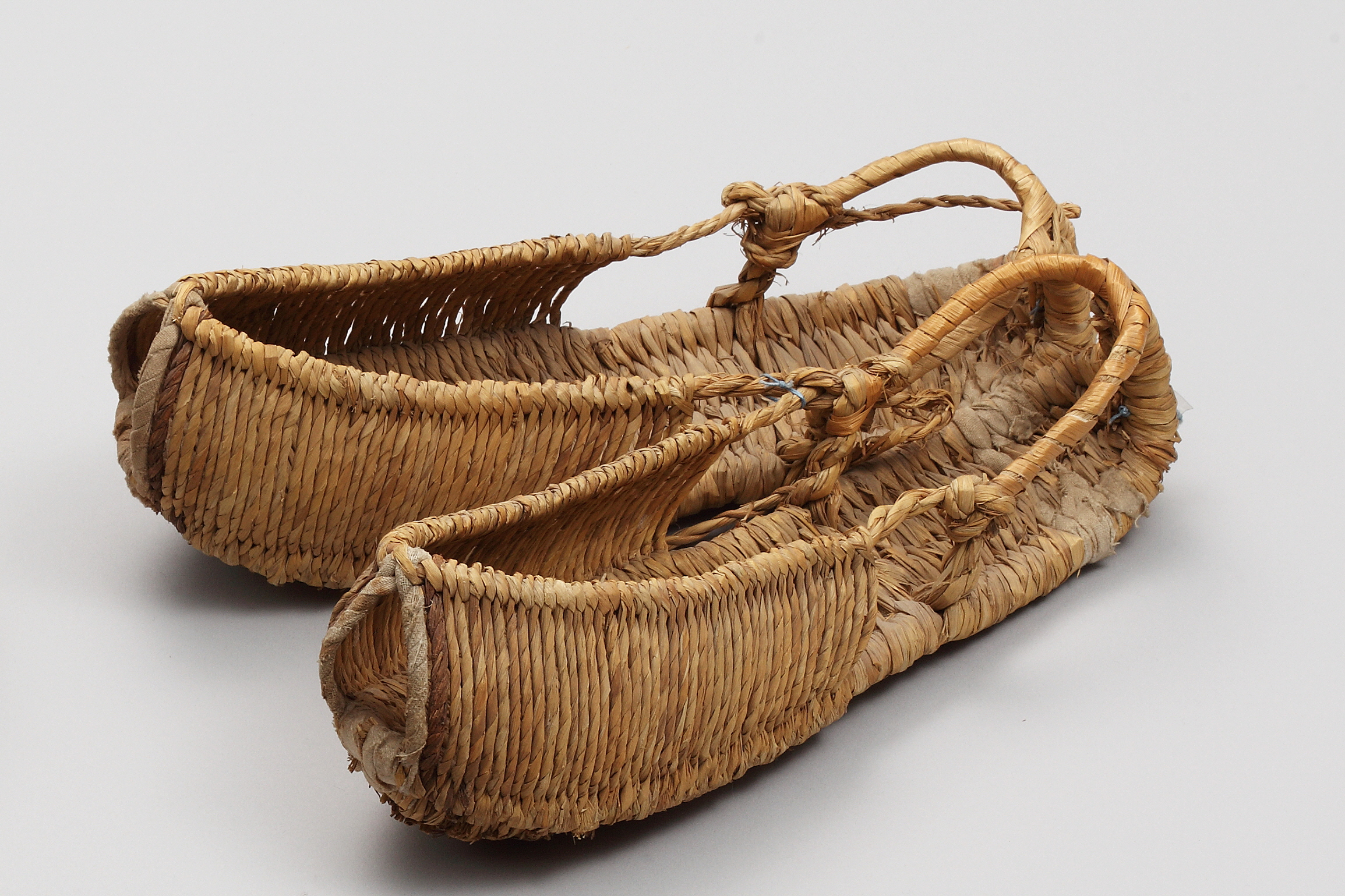
Jipsin

As of pilot episode, Flower Crew consists of 2 theme, Flower Road & Muddy Road. The symbol for Flower Road is Gomusin, are shoes made of rubber in a form of Korean traditional shoes. And Jipsin is the symbol for Muddy Road, are Korean traditional sandals made of straw.

== Cast member ==
The original Line-up for Flower Crew consist of 6 members. The original members of Flower Crew were Seo Jang-hoon, Ahn Jung-hwan, Jo Se-ho, Yoo Byung-jae and Kim Min-seok. Kim Min-seok and Jungkook left the show because of their hectic schedules and their position were replaced by Sechs Kies member, Eun Jiwon & Lee Jaijin from episode 1 that was broadcast on SBS Channel.

On the 4th Trip (Episode 12), Sechs Kies members Eun Jiwon & Lee Jaijin made last appearance and left the show for concentrating on group promotions & their spots was filled by the previous guest, WINNER's Kang Seung-yoon to be the 5th member of Flower Crew and latter episode, actor Lee Sung Jae had invited to be the 6th member of Flower Crew.

Name	Character & Trait	Duration	Notes
Seo Jang-hoon	Second Oldest Member; Tallest; Sport Guy; Grumbler; Unlucky	Episodes pilot–29	He has intense rivalry with Ahn Jung-hwan
Ahn Jung-hwan	Responsible Guy; Sport Guy; Third Oldest Member; Cooking Master; Unlucky	Episodes pilot–29	Arguably one of the most unlucky member in show (almost always end up in Muddy Road Team at the end of the day)
Jo Se-ho	Gag Man; Talkative; Smooth Talker; Dumb & Dumber; Kimchi Dance	Episodes pilot–29	He has great chemistry with Yoo Byung-jae as The Stupid Duo
Yoo Byung-jae	The Thinker; Trickster; Smart; Desperate; Girl's Choice; Shortest; Dumb & Dumber	Episodes pilot–29	In earlier episodes, he has found a trick to pick the Transfer Ticket 100% of the time. He has great chemistry with Jo Se-ho as The Stupid Duo
Kang Seung-yoon (Winner)	New Member; Idol Group; Tolerate; Guitar Guy; Little Devil	Episodes 13–29	Came in episode 7 as the guest of the episode, later, he was invited to become a permanent member of Flower Crew as of episode 13.
Lee Sung-jae	New Member; Oldest Member; Actor; Cute; Game Master; Unlucky	Episodes 17–29	Came in episode 13 as the guest of the episode, later, he was invited to become a permanent member of Flower Crew
Eun Jiwon (Sechs Kies)	Sechs Kies; Food Terrorist; Mischievous; Spoiler; Troublemaker	Episodes 1–12	Known as troublemaker during cook session with Ahn Jung-hwan
Lee Jaejin (Sechs Kies)	Sechs Kies; Peculiar; Hard To Read; Artistic; Grumpy	Episodes 1–12	The most unexpected member of Flower Crew because of his behavior

== Guest ==
Episode	Guest
Pilot (2 episodes)	Twice (Nayeon, Dahyun)
1	No Guests
2–3	Hong Jin-young
4–6	Choo Sung-hoon
5–6	Apink (Jung Eun-ji, Oh Ha-young)
7–9	Kang Seung-yoon (WINNER)
8–9	Solji (EXID)
10–11	Heechul (Super Junior)
11	Twice (Nayeon, Momo)
12	No Guests
13–14	Lee Dae-ho, Lee Sung-jae, Jinyoung (B1A4)
14	IU
15–16	Seungri (Big Bang), Minah (Girl's Day), Nara (Hello Venus)
17–18	Kim Se-jeong (I.O.I/Gugudan), Lee Sang-min
18	Sol Bi
19	Chae Soo-bin
19–20	Rain
20	Yura (Girl's Day)
21	Seolhyun (AOA)
22–23	Im Soo-hyang
23–24	Song Min-ho (WINNER), Cao Lu (Fiestar)
25	No Guests
26	Kim Jun-hyun
27-29	Lee Jaijin (Sechs Kies)
27	Hani (EXID)
28-29	Kyungri (Nine Muses)

== Ratings ==
In the ratings below, the highest rating for the show will be in red, and the lowest rating for the show will be in blue each year.

=== 2016 ===
List of ratings in 2016 (Episode 1 - 17)

Episode #	Broadcast Date	TNMS Ratings	AGB Ratings
1	September 5	3.2%	2.7%
2	September 12	3.0%	3.1%
3	September 19	2.4%	2.8%
4	September 26	3.6%	3.4%
5	October 3	3.3%	3.2%
6	October 10	2.7%	2.8%
7	October 17	3.4%	3.3%
8	October 24	3.1%	3.1%
9	October 31	3.0%	2.9%
10	November 7	3.4%	3.0%
11	November 14	2.9%	3.1%
12	November 21	3.1%	3.5%
13	November 27	4.5%	4.6%
14	December 4	4.2%	3.5%
15	December 11	4.1%	4.0%
16	December 18	4.2%	3.8%
17	December 25	3.9%	4.0%

=== 2017 ===
List of ratings in 2017 (Episode 18 - 29)

Episode #	Broadcast Date	TNMS Ratings	AGB Ratings
18	January 1	4.3%	3.8%
19	January 8	4.6%	4.3%
20	January 15	4.3%	5.6%
21	January 22	4.4%	4.9%
22	January 29	4.4%	4.5%
23	February 5	4.7%	4.7%
24	February 12	4.1%	4.7%
25	February 19	4.7%	4.6%
26	February 26	4.0%	4.1%
27	March 5	4.1%	3.8%
28	March 12	2.5%	2.8%
29	March 19	2.9%	2.8%

== Awards and nominations ==
Year	Award	Category	Recipient	Result	Ref
2016	10th SBS Entertainment Awards	Entertainment Scene Stealer Award	Jo Se-ho	Won	
2016	10th SBS Entertainment Awards	Top Excellence Award in Variety Show	Jo Se-ho	Nominated	
2016	10th SBS Entertainment Awards	Excellence Award in Variety Show	Seo Jang-hoon	Won	
2016	10th SBS Entertainment Awards	Excellence Award in Variety Show	Ahn Jung-hwan	Nominated	
2016	10th SBS Entertainment Awards	Rookie Award, Male	Yoo Byung-jae	Won	
2016	10th SBS Entertainment Awards	Best Friends Award	Flower Crew team	Won	
