= Tomb of Munmu of Silla =

Underwater tomb in Gyeongju, South Korea

- 문무대왕릉 (Korean)
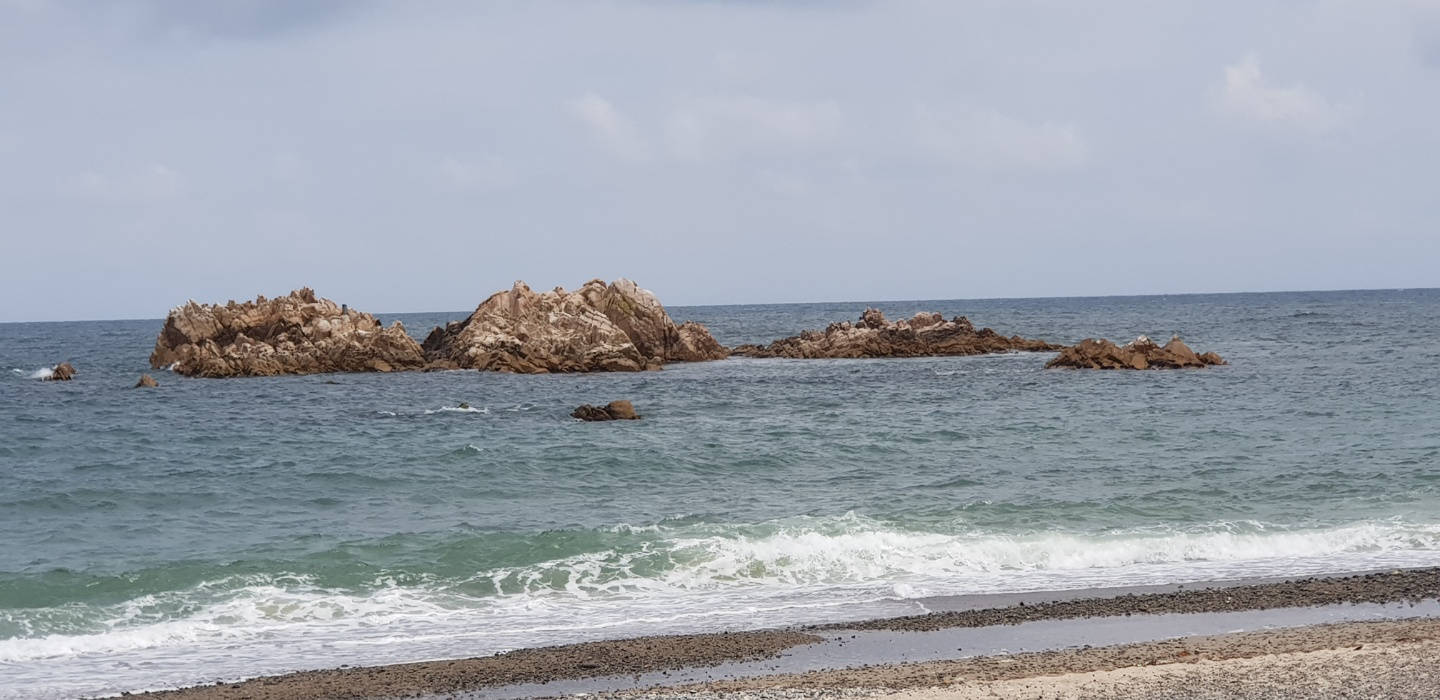
- The tomb, viewed from the coast (2018)
- Interactive map of Tomb of Munmu of Silla
- 35.7381906°N 129.4846487°E
- Type: Mausoleum

Historic Sites of South Korea
- Official name: Tomb of King Munmu, Gyeongju
- Designated: 1967-07-244
- Reference no.: 158

The tomb of Munmu, the 30th king of Silla, one of the Three Kingdoms of Korea, is located off the coast at Bonggil village, Yangbuk township, Gyeongju, North Gyeongsang Province, South Korea. It is designated as a Historic Site of South Korea.

== Location and Description ==
The tomb of Munmu of Silla is one of the few intentionally constructed underwater tombs in the world. It is located near the coast of Bonggil-ri, South Korea. It looks like a small rocky island from a distance. At low tide, the many small rocks surrounding the tomb are visible, looking like pillars. There is a depression in the centre of the largest rock; water flows in and out of it during tides. The monument built on the rocks collapsed shortly after being built. Two large sections and one small stone of the monument have been discovered so far. The Gyeongju National Museum is in charge of the tomb.

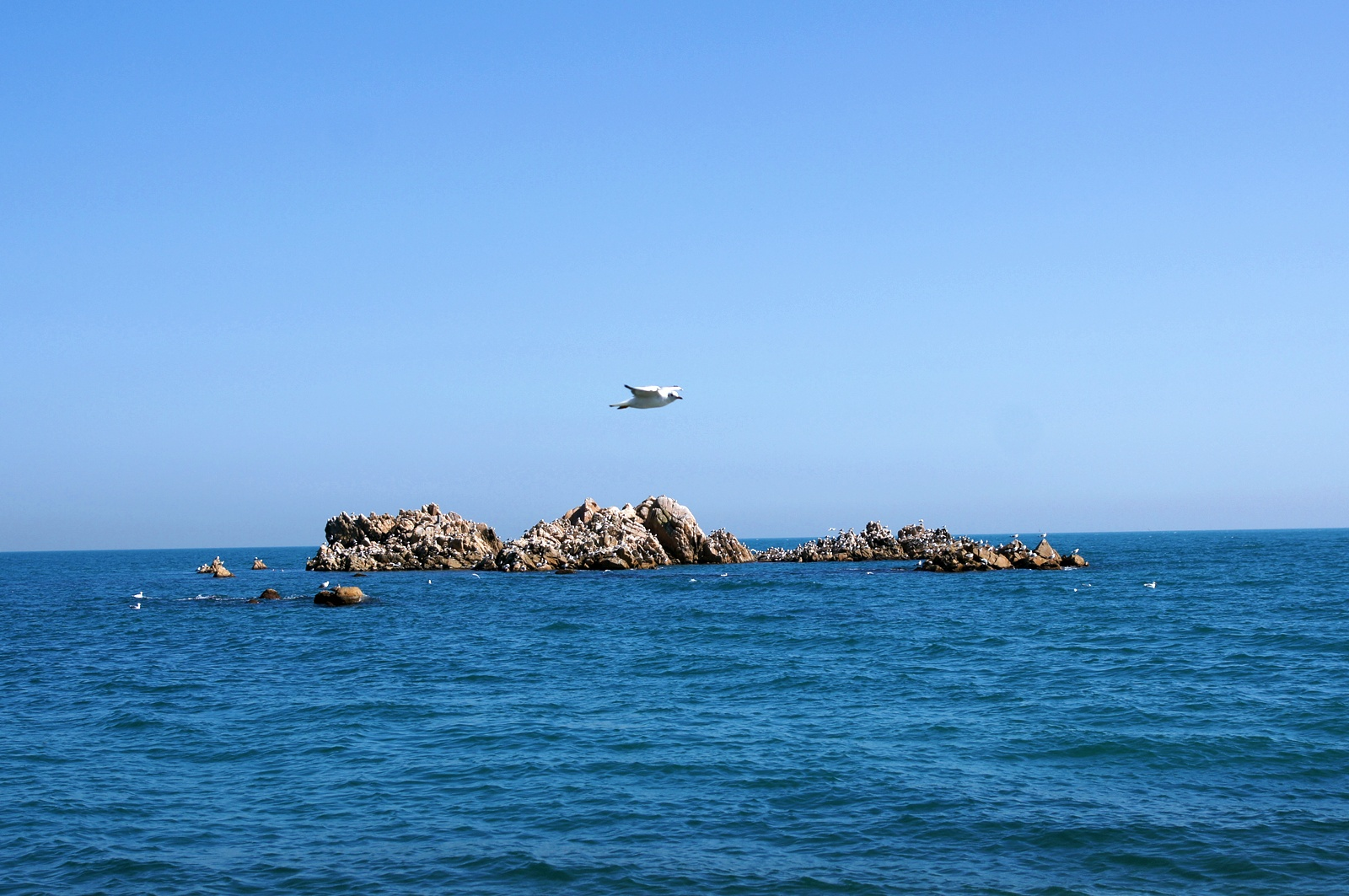
Underwater tomb of 'Munmu of Silla'

== History ==
=== Late Silla ===
Munmu of Silla (626–681) unified the Three Kingdoms of Korea. He began building military facilities and along the eastern coast of Korea to prevent Japan from invading. He also started building a Buddhist temple, but fell ill and died before it was completed. He left a will stating that his body should be cremated in accordance with Buddhist ceremony and his ashes should be buried in the East Sea. After his death, his son King Sinmun completed the temple in 682 CE and named it Kamŭnsa. Munmu's tomb was constructed in the sea under the belief that he would become a dragon and protect the land from invasion.

=== Tombstone ===
Because Munmu was buried among sea rocks, his tombstone could not be placed near his body. It is assumed that his tombstone was built at Sacheonwang Temple. This temple is mentioned in the historical record Samguk sagi.

After the fall of Silla, Munmu of Silla's tomb was lost. Its existence was confirmed by Hong Yang-ho in 1760, and reconfirmed by scholar Kim Jeong-hui, who visited Gyeongju in 1817. The lower part of the tombstone was discovered in 1961, and the higher part of tombstone was discovered in 2009 by a gas inspector when it was used as a laundry stone in a house in eastern Gyeongju.

== Cultural activities ==
The tomb of Munmu is associated with various festivals held nearby.

=== Chunhyang Daeje ===
Chunhyang Daeje is a festivals commemorating ancestors, held in early spring. More than 900 people participate in it.

=== Sunrise festival ===
Every New Year's Day, the sunrise festival is celebrated near the tomb of Munmu.

=== King Munmu culture festival ===
The city of Gyeongju organizes various traditional cultural events honoring King Munmu in front of his tomb. On the first day of the event, the royal procession from Kamŭnsa temple to the tomb of King Munmu is reenacted. Kites are flown, and various rituals dedicated to King Munmu are performed.

== Gallery ==
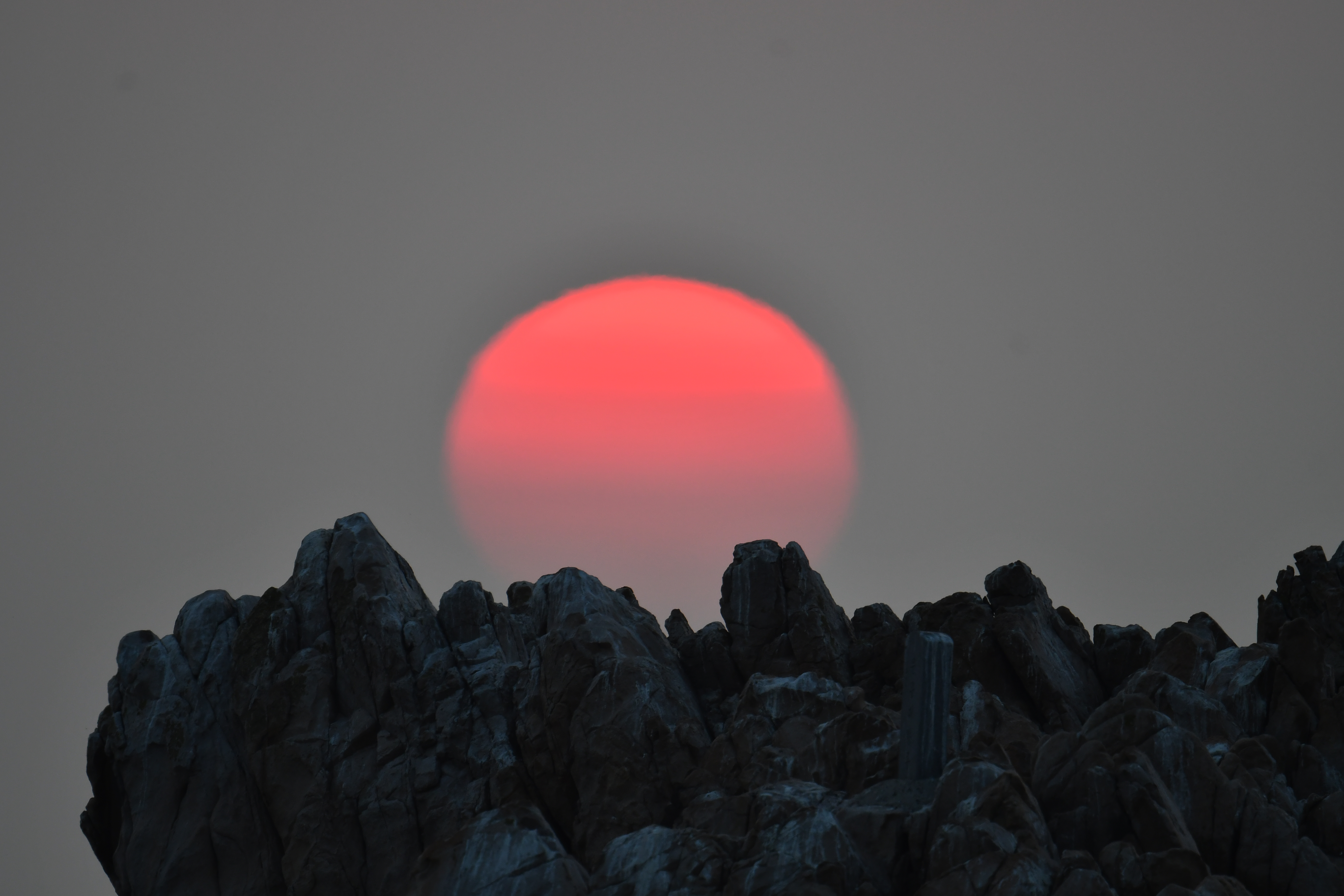

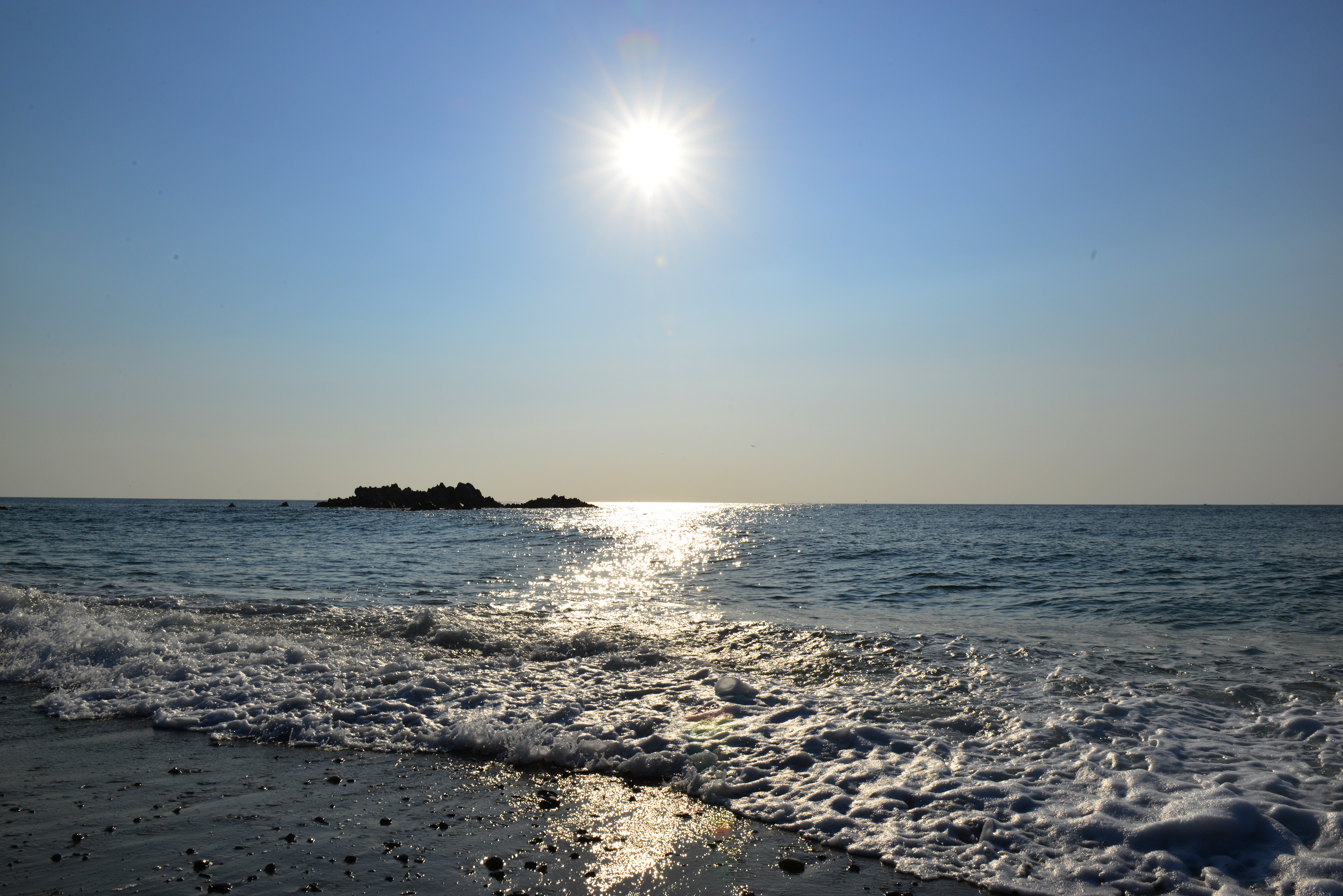

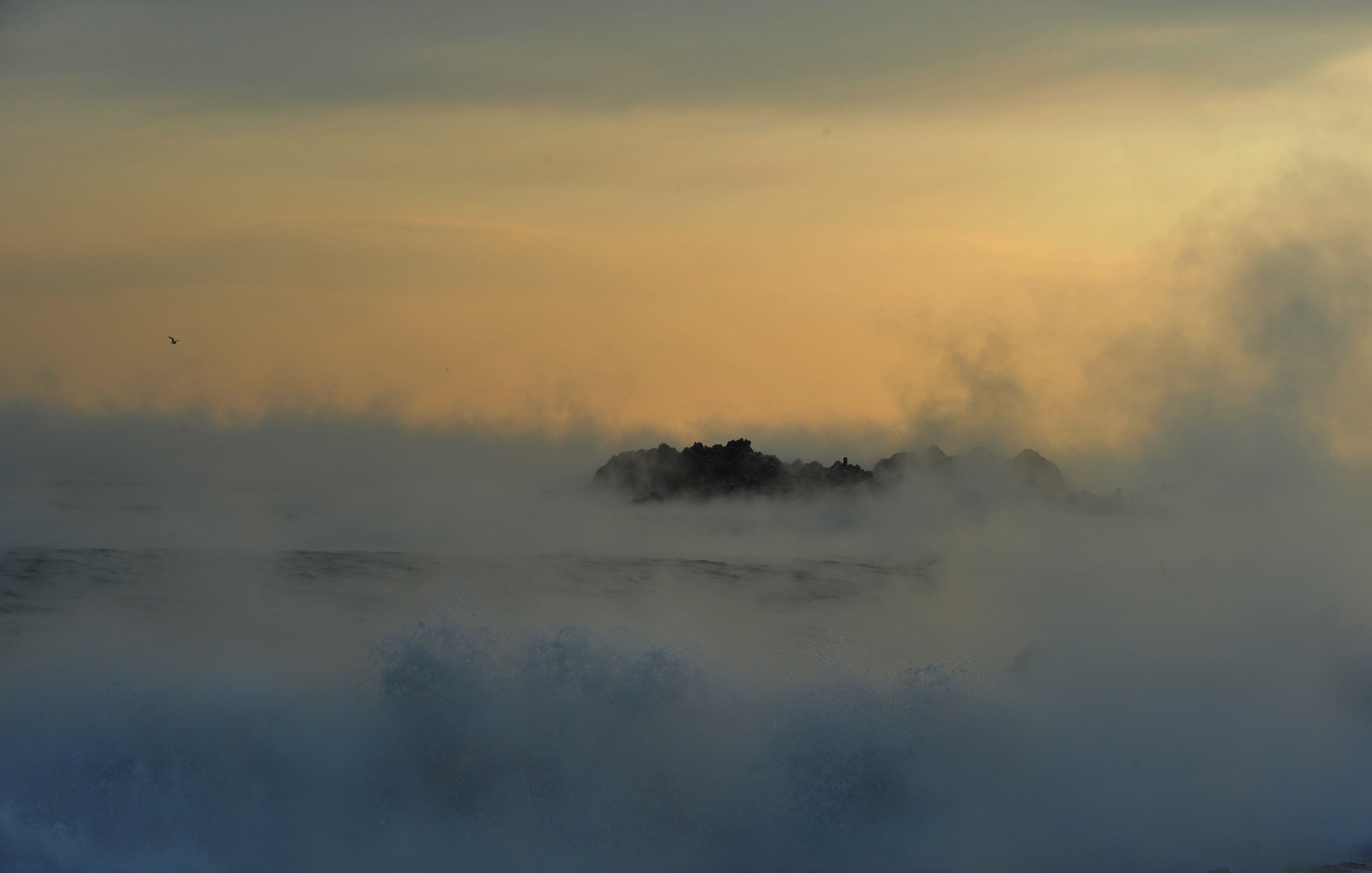

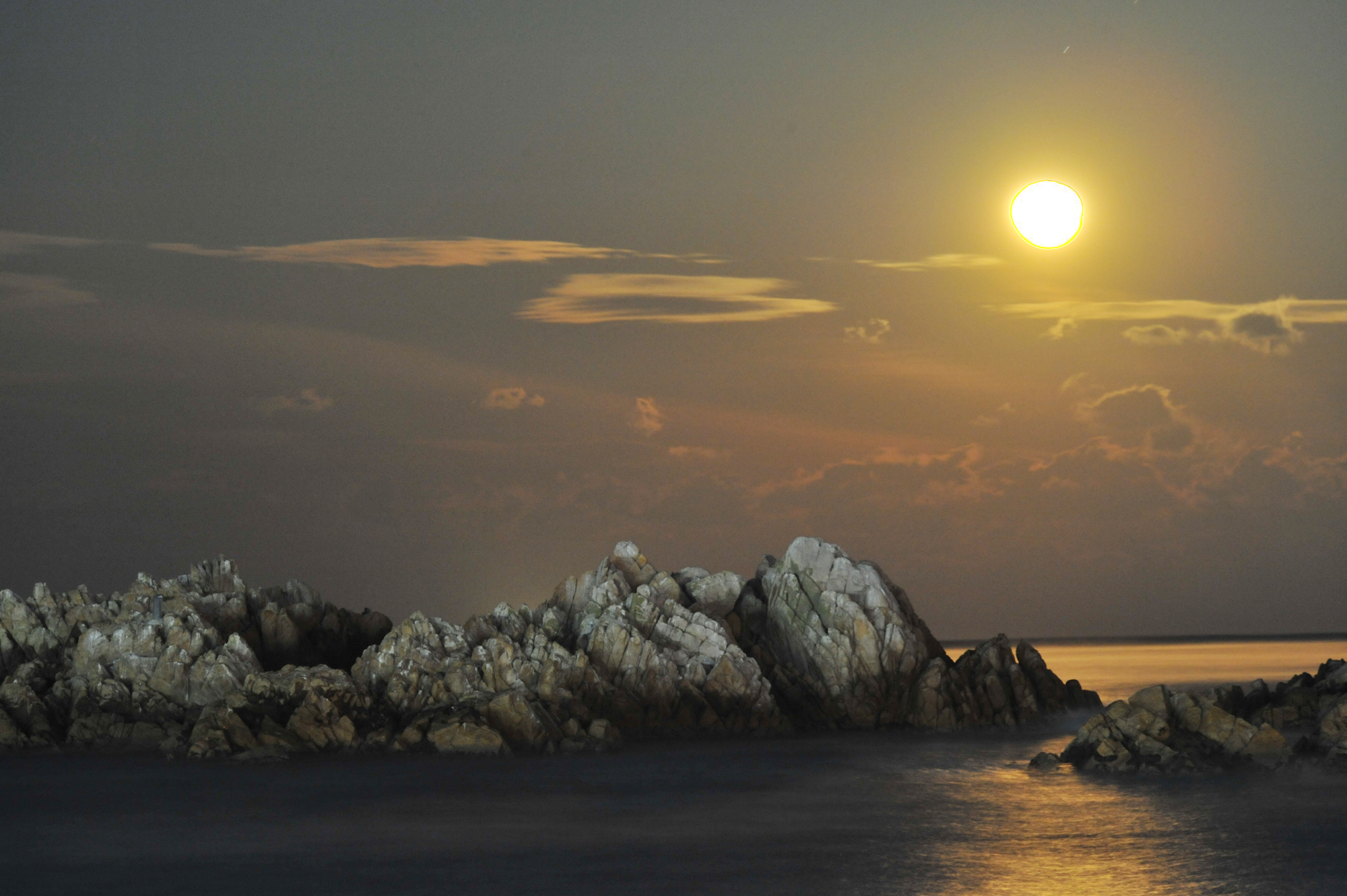

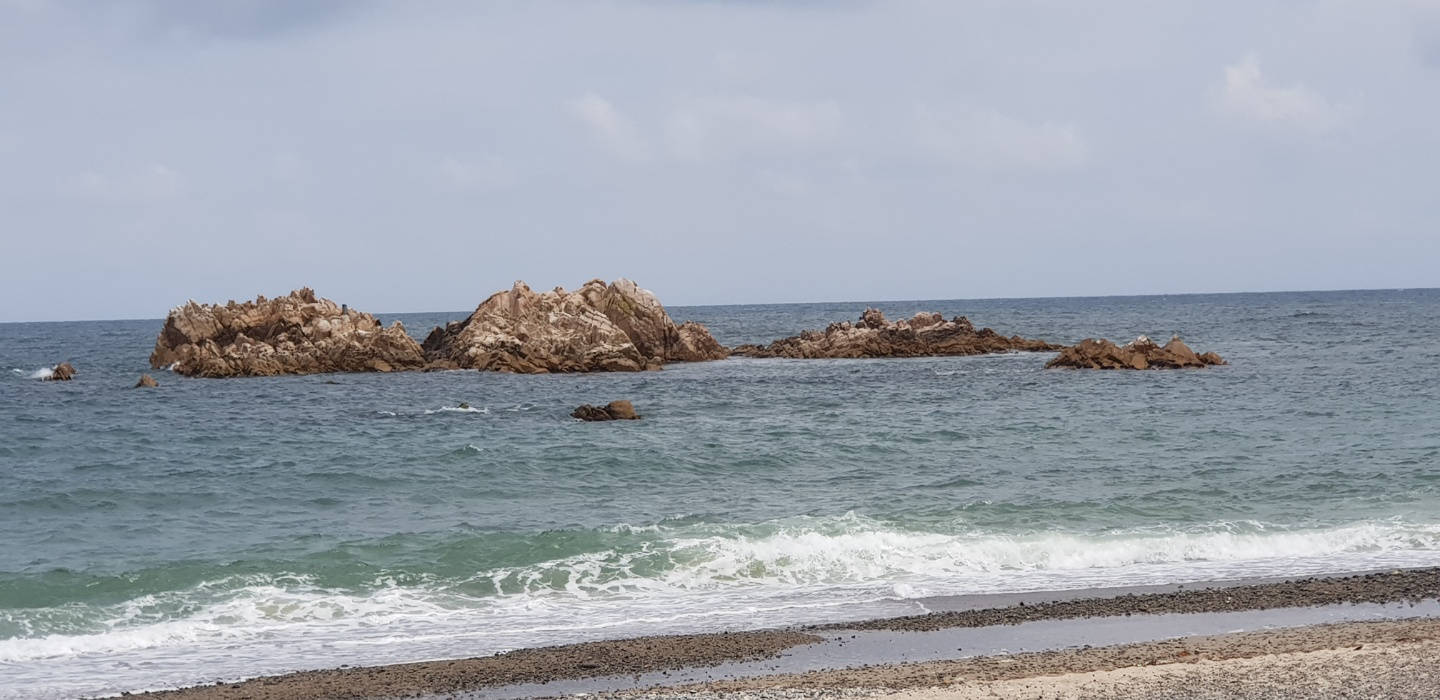

== See also ==
- History of Korea
- Silla
