= 2016 SBS Entertainment Awards =

10th edition of award ceremony

- Date: December 25, 2016
- Site: SBS Prism Tower, Sangam-dong, Mapo-gu, Seoul
- Hosted by: Main: Lee Kyung-kyu; Kang Ho-dong; Lee Si-young; Special: Yang Se-hyung; Kim Shin-young

Television coverage
- Network: SBS
- Duration: 180 minutes
- Viewership: 9.9% (part 1); 7.8% (part 2)

The 2016 SBS Entertainment Awards presented by Seoul Broadcasting System (SBS), took place on December 25, 2016 at SBS Prism Tower in Sangam-dong, Mapo-gu, Seoul. It was hosted by Lee Kyung-kyu, Kang Ho-dong and Lee Si-young. The nominees were chosen from SBS variety, talk and comedy shows that aired from December 2015 to November 2016.

== Nominations and winners ==
(Winners denoted in bold)

Grand Prize (Daesang)	Program of the Year	Star of the Year (SBS PDs' choice)
**Shin Dong-yup** - **My Little Old Boy**, **TV Animal Farm**; Kim Byung-man - Law of the Jungle; Kim Gook-jin - Flaming Youth; Kim Gu-ra - Same Bed, Different Dreams, Men in Black Box; Yoo Jae-suk - Running Man	**My Little Old Boy** (Variety); **Unanswered Questions** (Documentary)	**Park Jin-young** - **K-pop Star 6: The Last Chance**
Top Excellence Award
in Variety Show	in Talk Show	in Comedy Show
**Lee Kwang-soo** - **Running Man**; Haha - Running Man; Jo Se-ho - Flower Crew; Kang Susie - Flaming Youth	**Kim Gun-mo** - **My Little Old Boy**, **Fantastic Duo**; Han Hye-jin - My Little Old Boy; Kim Jun-hyun - Baek Jong-won's Top 3 Chef King; Park Soo-hong - My Little Old Boy	**Hong Yoon-hwa** - **People Looking for a Laugh**; Choi Gook - People Looking for a Laugh; Hwang Hyun-hee - People Looking for a Laugh; Lee Eun-hyung - People Looking for a Laugh
Excellence Award
in Variety Show	in Talk Show	in Comedy Show
**Seo Jang-hoon** - **My Little Old Boy**, **Flower Crew**; Ahn Jung-hwan - Flower Crew; Gu Bon-seung - Flaming Youth; Kim Wan-sun - Flaming Youth	**Jun Hyun-moo** - **Fantastic Duo**, **K-pop Star 6: The Last Chance**; **Sung Dae-hyun** - **Jagiya**, **Einstein**; Cultwo - Einstein; Tony Ahn - My Little Old Boy	**Kim Jeong-hwan** - **People Looking for a Laugh**; **Kim Jin-gon** - **People Looking for a Laugh**; Hong Hyun-hee - People Looking for a Laugh; Kim Won-goo - People Looking for a Laugh
Rookie Award, Male	Rookie Award, Female	Best Entertainer Award
**Kangnam** - **Law of the Jungle**; **Yoo Byung-jae** - **Flower Crew**; Do Gwang-rok - People Looking for a Laugh; Kim Min-seok - Inkigayo	**Gong Seung-yeon** and **Yoo Jeong-yeon** - **Inkigayo**; **Lee Yeon-soo** - **Flaming Youth**; Jang Da-woon - People Looking for a Laugh; Lee Si-young - Baek Jong-won's Top 3 Chef King	**Kim Hwan** - **Good Morning**, **Jagiya**, **Law of the Jungle**; **Kim Min-seok** - **Inkigayo**; **Seolhyun** - **Law of the Jungle**
Special Award	Mobile Icon Award	Best Friends Award
**Baek Jong-won** - **Baek Jong-won's Top 3 Chef King**	**Yang Se-hyung** - **Yang Se-hyung's Shorterview**	**Flower Crew team**
Entertainment Scene Stealer Award	PD Award	Radio DJ Award
**Choi Sung-kook** - **Flaming Youth**; **Jo Se-ho** - **Flower Crew**	**Kim Jun-hyun** - **Baek Jong-won's Top 3 Chef King**; **Park Soo-hong** - **My Little Old Boy**	**Park So-hyun** - **Park So-hyun's Love Game**
Scriptwriter of the Year	Best Couple Award	
**Lee Jae-gook** - **Kim Chang Ryul's Old School Radio Show**; **Park Jin-ah** - **Curious Stories Y**, **The Its Know**, **TV Animal Farm**; **Yook So-young** - **My Little Old Boy**	**Kim Kwang-kyu** and **Kim Wan-sun** - **Flaming Youth**; **Park Hyung-il** and **Park Soon-ja** - **Jagiya**; Baek Jong-won and Kim Jun-hyun - Baek Jong-won's Top 3 Chef King; Seo Kang-joon and Jota - Law of the Jungle	

== Presenters ==
Order	Presenter	Award	Ref.
1	Yoo Jae-suk, Minho (SHINee)	Rookie Award	
2	Choi Sung-kook, Kim Wan-sun	Radio DJ Award	
3	Kim Gook-jin, Kang Susie	Best Couple Award	
4	Park Sang-hyun, Gong Seung-yeon	Best Friends Award	
5	Kim Kwang-kyu, Leeteuk	Entertainment Scene Stealer Award	
6	Jo Se-ho, Yoo Byung-jae	PD Award	
7	Kim Jun-hyun, Kim Ji-min	Special Award	
8	Kangnam, Lee Tae-im	Mobile Icon Award	
9	Seo Jang-hoon, Nara (Hello Venus)	Best Entertainer Award	
10	Heo Ji-woong, Tony An	Program of the Year; Star of the Year	
11	Park Soo-hong, Hwang Seok-jeong	Excellence Award	
12	Kim Gura, Kang Ye-won	Top Excellence Award	
13	Park Jeong-hoon, Seolhyun (AOA)	Grand Prize (Daesang)	

== Special performances ==
Order	Artist	Song/Spectacle	Ref.
1	Twice	"Cheer Up", "TT" (ft. "Middle-aged Clubber" Park Soo-hong)	
2	People Looking for a Laugh (Hwang Hyun-hee, Kim Min-gi, Song In-ho, Kim Young-goo)	Comedy show "Grand Award nominees' photoshop"	
3	GFriend	"Navillera" (너 그리고 나)	
4	Jeon In-kwon & Daesang nominees	"Don't Worry My Darling" (걱정말아요 그대)	
