= Yoo Byung-jae =

South Korean TV personality (born 1988)

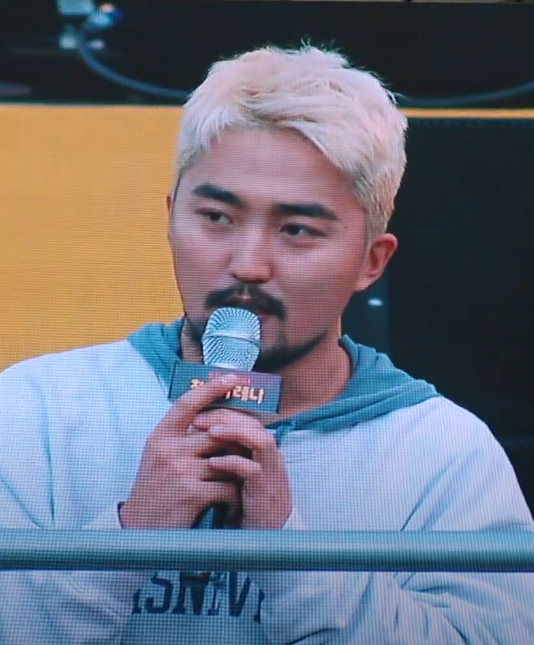
- Yoo in 2017
- Born: May 6, 1988 (age 38); Hongseong County, South Korea
- Occupations: Television personality; actor; screenwriter
- Years active: 2011–present
- Agent(s): YG Entertainment (2015–2019); Sand Box Network (2019–2024); Black Paper (2024–present)

Korean name
- Hangul: 유병재
- Hanja: 柳炳宰
- RR: Yu Byeongjae
- MR: Yu Pyŏngjae

Yoo Byung-jae (born May 6, 1988) is a South Korean television personality, actor and screenwriter.

== Career ==
Yoo rose to fame in 2012 when he became a writer on the third season of live sketch comedy show Saturday Night Live Korea. He then joined the cast of the succeeding seasons of SNL Korea, notably playing a star's overworked manager in the sketch Extreme Job. He also appeared in the variety shows Yoo Se-yoon's Art Video and First Day of Work. Yoo's increasing popularity led to Infinite Challenge's "Sixth Man" project, where he was one of eight celebrities who competed to become the reality show's new regular cast member (Yoo lost to singer Hwang Kwanghee).

In 2015, Yoo made his first foray into scripted television when he wrote and starred in The Superman Age, a seven-episode fantasy-comedy series about three single, unemployed "losers" whose virginity at age 25 enables them to acquire superpowers. Later that year, he became the first comedian to sign with top agency YG Entertainment, who called Yoo "not just a talented actor with an outstanding comical wit, but also an asset to the company as a writer who brings creative content."

Yoo's comedy special Too Much Information was released on Netflix on March 16, 2018, with a second, titled Discomfort Zone, released on August 17, 2018.

On May 21, 2019, it was announced that he left YG entertainment. It was later announced that he signed an exclusive contract with Sandbox.

== Philanthropy ==
On March 6, 2022, Yoo donated 10 million Korean won (around USD 7,200) to the Hope Bridge Disaster Relief Association to help the victims of the massive wildfire that started in Uljin, Gyeongbuk and has spread to Samcheok, Gangwon.

On August 9, 2022, Yoo donated ₩10 million to help those affected by the 2022 South Korean floods through the Hope Bridge Korea Disaster Relief Association.

On September 7, 2022, donated Yoo ₩10 million to help those recovering damage from Typhoon Hinnamno through The Hope Bridge Korea Disaster Relief Association.

In November 2022, Yoo donated ₩10 million to G Foundation, an international development cooperation NGO, to help the underprivileged have a warm winter.

On October 1, 2023, Yoo donated 10 million won to provide sanitary pads to underprivileged women.

== Filmography ==
=== Variety show ===
Year	Title	Notes/Ref.
2012	Saturday Night Live Korea - Season 3	Writer
2012	Yoo Se-yoon's Art Video	
2013 – 2015	Saturday Night Live Korea - Season 4 – 6	Cast member
2014	First Day of Work	Cast member
2015	Chuseok Special: Visible Radio Yeowoosai	Cast member
2016	Flower Crew	Cast member
2018	Creaking Heroes	Cast member
2018	YG Future Strategy Office	Cast member
2018 – 2021	Great Escape - Season 1 – 4	Cast member
2018 – present	Omniscient Interfering View	Cast member
2019	Hollywood Breakfast	Manager
2019 – 2021	Those Who Cross the Line - Season 2 – 4	Cast member
2020	Delicious Rendezvous	Episode 36 - 78
2021	Still Alive	Main Cast Chuseok pilot
2021	Mialin	Host
2022	Hong Jin-kyung's Glorious Devotee Life	Host
2022	Oh! My Wedding	Wedding planner
2022	Crazy Tongue	Host
2023	Solo Reunion Recital	Host
2025	The Great Escape: The Story	Cast member

=== Web shows ===
Year	Title	Platform	Role	Notes	Ref.
2021	Good Advertisement	YouTube	Host	Channel tvN D ENT	

=== Television series ===
Year	Title	Role	Notes
2015	The Superman Age	Yoo Byung-jae	Also credited as screenwriter

=== Web series ===
Year	Title	Role	Notes	Ref.
2022	Dr. Park's Clinic		Cameo	
2022	Unicorn	screenwriter		

=== Stand-up comedy - comedy specials ===
Year	Title	Role	Network	Notes
March 2018	Too Much Information	Yoo Byung-jae	Netflix	Actor, writer and director
August 2018	Discomfort Zone	Yoo Byung-jae	Netflix	Actor, writer and director

=== Music video appearances ===
Year	Song title	Artist
2015	"쩔어 (ZUTTER)"	GD & TOP

== Discography ==
Yoo released the single "My Girlfriend.." on November 18, 2011, under the label Nameless Music/Sixteen Media. On November 18, he was featured on YG Entertainment labelmate Mino's first album XX on the track "Hope" (소원이지; sowoniji).

== Accolades ==
=== Awards and nominations ===
Year	Award	Category	Nominated work	Result	Ref.
2016	10th SBS Entertainment Awards	Rookie Award, Male	Flower Crew	Won	
2018	54th Baeksang Arts Awards	Best Variety Performer – Male	Creaking Heroes	Nominated	
2018	18th MBC Entertainment Awards	Excellence Award, Variety Category (Male)	Omniscient Interfering View; Those Who Cross the Line	Nominated	
2018	18th MBC Entertainment Awards	Best Entertainer Award (Variety)	Omniscient Interfering View; Those Who Cross the Line	Won	
2019	55th Baeksang Arts Awards	Best Variety Performer – Male	Omniscient Interfering View	Nominated	
2019	19th MBC Entertainment Awards	Excellence Award, Variety Category (Male)	Those Who Cross the Line	Won	
2021	21st MBC Entertainment Awards	Best Entertainer Award	Omniscient Interfering View and Those Who Cross the Line: Master X	Won	
2021	21st MBC Entertainment Awards	Best Couple Award with Yang Se-hyung	Omniscient Interfering View	Nominated	

=== Listicles ===
Name of publisher, year listed, name of listicle, and placement
Publisher	Year	Listicle	Placement	Ref.
Forbes	2019	Korea Power Celebrity	15th	
