= Sach'ŏnwangsa =

Former temple in Gyeongju, South Korea

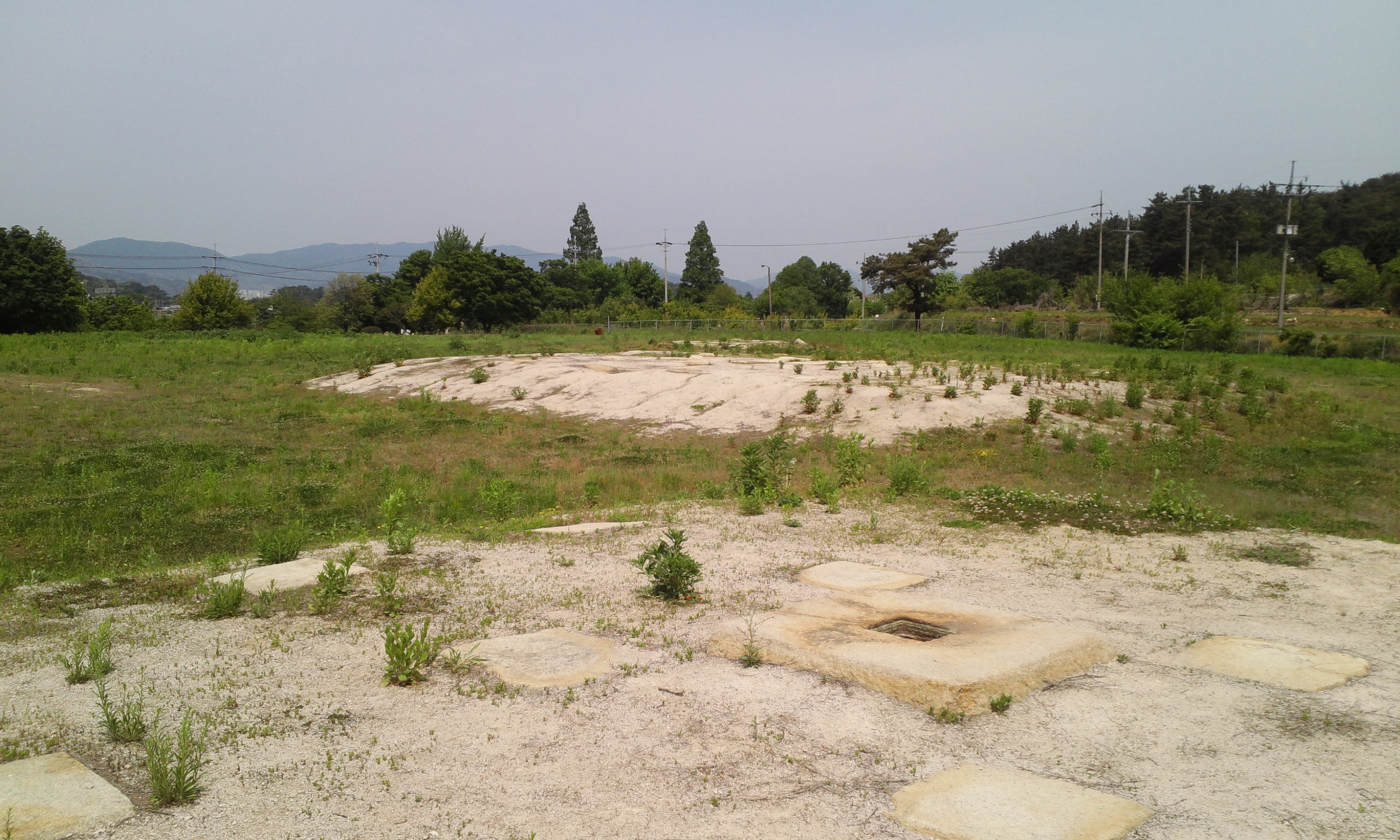

Religion
- Affiliation: Korean Buddhism

Location
- Interactive map of Sach'ŏnwangsa
- Coordinates: 35°49′9″N 129°14′31″E

Architecture
- Completed: 679 (Korean calendar)
- Destroyed: Unknown
- Historic Sites of South Korea
- Official name: Sacheonwangsa Temple Site, Gyeongju
- Designated: January 21, 1963
- Reference no.: 8

Sach'ŏnwangsa (Korean: 사천왕사; Hanja: 四天王寺; RR: Sacheonwangsa) was a Silla-era Buddhist temple in what is now Gyeongju, South Korea. On January 21, 1963, it was made Historic Site of South Korea No. 8.

The temple is described in detail in the Samguk yusa. It was built amidst a conflict with the Tang dynasty in China. It was completed in 679 (Korean calendar). It had Korea's first twin pagodas. Its use was attested to in the Koryosa. It was attested to in the 1530 geography book Sinjŭng Tongguk yŏji sŭngnam. It is not known when it fell into disuse. It was used as a private house by the late 15th century.

Excavations began on the site in 1922, during the 1910–1945 Japanese colonial period. It was excavated seven times from 2006 to 2012.
