= Odaesansago National History Archives =

Archives in Pyeongchang, South Korea

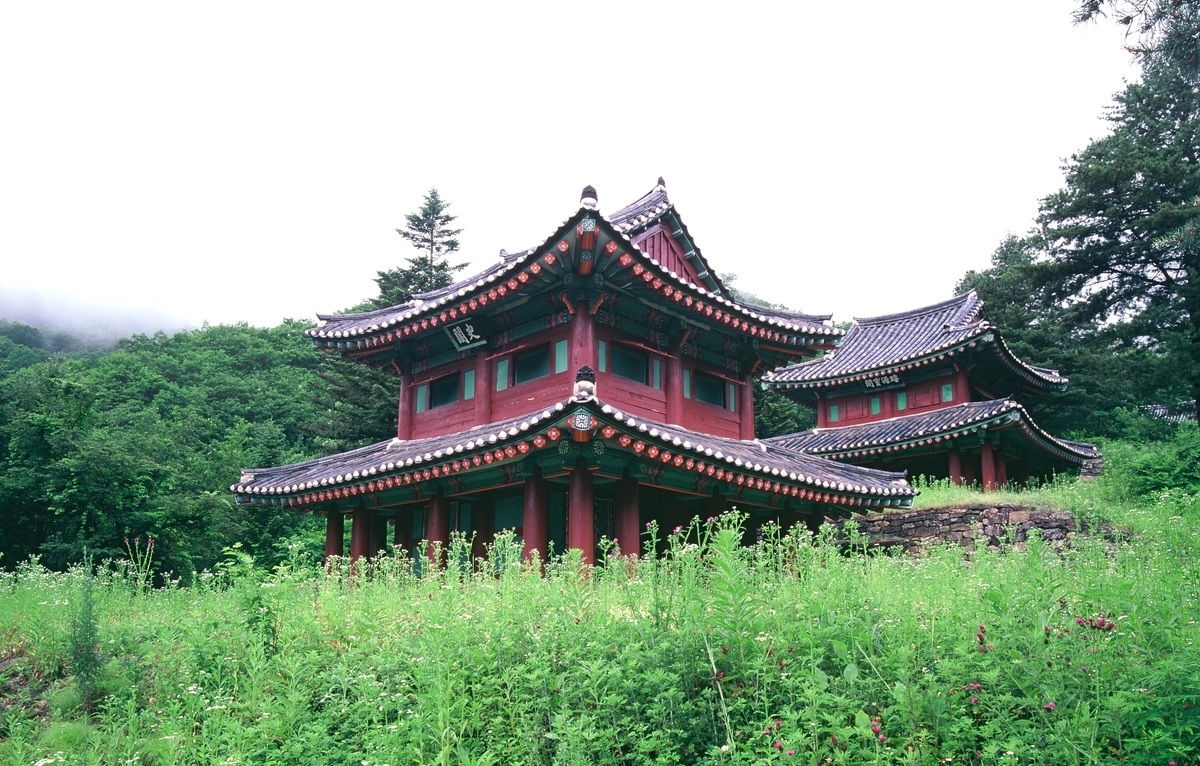
- Buildings of the archive
- Interactive map of the Odaesansago National History Archives area

General information
- Location: Pyeongchang County, Gangwon Province, South Korea
- Coordinates: 37°45′53″N 128°33′58″E

Design and construction
- Designations

Historic Sites of South Korea
- Designated: 1963-01-21
- Reference no.: 37

The Odaesansago National History Archives (Korean: 오대산사고; Hanja: 五臺山史庫) are Joseon-era royal libraries on the mountain Odaesan in Pyeongchang County, Gangwon Province, South Korea. They were used to store copies of the Veritable Records of the Joseon Dynasty. On January 21, 1963, the archives were made Historic Site of South Korea No. 37.

It was established in 1606 (Korean calendar). It was one of several new archives established after the 1592–1598 Imjin War, when the Japanese invaders destroyed most of the royal archives in Korea. These destructions almost resulted in the total loss of Veritable Records. This facility held just one set of copies of those records. They continued holding these and other records until the early 20th century, when Korea was annexed by Japan. They then went under the ownership of the Office of the Yi Dynasty. In March 1911, the Government-General of Chōsen seized the archive's records. In October 1913, the records were transferred to the Tokyo Imperial University library. Most of these records were lost in the 1923 Great Kantō earthquake. 45 volumes were spared, as they were on loan elsewhere at the time. In May 1932, 27 of its volumes were transferred to Keijō Imperial University (predecessor to Seoul National University) in Korea. The rest of its collection continued to be held at the University of Tokyo until 2006, when they were returned to South Korea. They are now held at the National Palace Museum of Korea.
