= List of Saturday Night Live Korea episodes =

This is a list of episodes of Saturday Night Live Korea. Abbreviated as SNL Korea or SNLK, it is a South Korean late-night live television sketch comedy and variety television program that airs on general service cable channel tvN on Saturdays at 23:00. Adapted from the long-running American TV show Saturday Night Live on NBC, SNL Korea premiered on December 3, 2011, and season 9 premiered on March 25, 2017.

== Series overview ==
Series	Episodes	Originally released	
Series	Episodes	First released	Last released
1	8	3 December 2011	21 January 2012
2	8	26 May 2012	14 July 2012
3	17	8 September 2012	29 December 2012
4	38	23 February 2013	23 November 2013
5	35	1 March 2014	29 November 2014
6	32	14 February 2015	19 December 2015
7	18	27 February 2016	25 June 2016
8	17	3 September 2016	24 December 2016
9	33	25 March 2017	18 November 2017
10	10	4 September 2021	6 November 2021
11	20	25 December 2021	28 May 2022
12	10	19 November 2022	28 January 2023
13	9	15 July 2023	16 September 2023
14	10	2 March 2024	4 May 2024
15	10	31 August 2024	2 November 2024
16	10	5 April 2025	7 June 2025
17	10	28 March 2026	30 May 2026

== Episodes ==
=== Season 1 (2011–12) ===
The first season ran from December 3, 2011, to January 21, 2012, for eight episodes.

No. overall	No. in season	Host(s)	Musical guest(s)	Guest(s)	Original release date	Ref(s)
1	1	Kim Joo-hyuk	Dynamic Duo	Shim Eun-kyung	3 December 2011	
2	2	Gong Hyung-jin	Kim Chang-wan Band	TBA	10 December 2011	
3	3	Kim In-kwon	Kim Jo-han	TBA	17 December 2011	
4	4	Kolleen Park	Choi Jae-rim	TBA	24 December 2011	
5	5	Kim Dong-wook	Jang Jae-in	TBA	31 December 2011	
6	6	Kim Sang-kyung	TBA	Kim In-kwon	7 January 2012	
7	7	Kim Sung-soo	Jungyup	TBA	14 January 2012	
8	8	Ye Ji-won	TBA	Kwak Seung-Jun	21 January 2012	

=== Season 2 (2012) ===
The second season ran from May 26 to July 14, 2012, for eight episodes.

No. overall	No. in season	Host(s)	Musical guest(s)	Guest(s)	Original release date	Ref(s)
9	1	Oh Ji-ho	Baek Ji-young	TBA	26 May 2012	
10	2	Jo Yeo-jeong	TBA	Kim Dong-wook	2 June 2012	
11	3	Yang Dong-geun	TBA	Jung Joon	9 June 2012	
12	4	(none)	TBA	Lee Soon-jae; Im Ha-ryong; Kim Bu-seon; Lee Jae-oh	16 June 2012	
13	5	Shin Dong-yup	TBA	Hong Seok-cheon	23 June 2012	
14	6	Park Jin-young	Lena Park	Lee Sang-min; Kim Min-soo; Min Hyo-rin; Shin Eun-kyung	30 June 2012	
15	7	Bada; Horan (Clazziquai); Ham Eun-jung (T-ara)	TBA	Chung Se-kyun; Hyolyn (Sistar)	7 July 2012	
16	8	Super Junior	Super Junior	TBA	14 July 2012	

=== Season 3 (2012) ===
The third season ran from September 8 to November 15, 2012, for seventeen episodes.

No. overall	No. in season	Host(s)	Musical guest(s)	Guest(s)	Original release date	Ref(s)
17	1	SNL cast	TBA	Kim Bo-sung, Jung Woon-taek	8 September 2012	
18	2	Seo In-guk; Eun Ji-won; Lee Si-eon; Shin So-yul	TBA	TBA	15 September 2012	
19	3	Yoo Oh-sung	TBA	TBA	22 September 2012	
20	4	(none)	TBA	TBA	29 September 2012	
21	5	Lee Hyun-woo	TBA	Yoon Sang, Kwon Oh-joong	6 October 2012	
22	6	Kim Jung-nan	TBA	Dongho (U-KISS)	13 October 2012	
23	7	Son Dam-bi	TBA	Orange Caramel, Kim Wan-sun	20 October 2012	
24	8	(none) (Note: Director's cut special)	TBA	Lee Hyun-woo; Kim Jung-nan; Son Dam-bi	27 October 2012	
25	9	Jun Hyun-moo	TBA	Shin Young-il	3 November 2012	
26	10	Park Eun-ji	TBA	Ahn Young-mi, Nancy Rang	10 November 2012	
27	11	Tony An & Jang Woo-hyuk	Smash	Smash; Kang Ye-bin; Kim Dong-hyun	17 November 2012	
28	12	(none)	TBA	Jun Hyun-moo; Park Eun-ji; Tony An; Jang Woo-hyuk; Shin Young-il	24 November 2012	
29	13	Jay Park	TBA	NS Yoon-G; DickPunks; Shin So-yul; Won Mi-yeon	1 December 2012	
30	14	Kim Hyun-sook	TBA	Kwak Hyun-hwa, Choi Won-jun	8 December 2012	
31	15	Brown Eyed Girls	TBA	Jang Jin	15 December 2012	
32	16	(none) (Note: SNL Christmas Finale Special (director's cut))	TBA	Jay Park; Kim Hyun-sook; Brown Eyed Girls	22 December 2012	
33	17	(none) (Note: 격동 SNL (mockumentary))	TBA	TBA	29 December 2012	

=== Season 4 (2013) ===
No. overall	No. in season	Host(s)	Musical guest(s)	Guest(s)	Original release date	Ref(s)
34	1	Choi Min-soo	Miyuki Nakajima	Jang Jin, Ko Kyung-pyo	23 February 2013	
35	2	Lee Moon-sik	TBA	Kang Yong-suk	2 March 2013	
36	3	Lee Young-ja	TBA	Kang Yong-suk	9 March 2013	
37	4	Yoo Se-yoon	UV	Choi Jong-hoon	16 March 2013	
38	5	Choi Yeo-jin	TBA	Kim Ye-won (Jewelry); Seo Kyung-seok; Lee Yoon-seok	23 March 2013	
39	6	Oh Man-seok	TBA	Fujita Sayuri, Kwak Han-gu	30 March 2013	
40	7	Cultwo	TBA	Seo Kyung-seok, Lee Yoon-seok	6 April 2013	
41	8	2AM	TBA	TBA	13 April 2013	
42	9	Lee Soo-young	Jay Park	TBA	20 April 2013	
43	10	4Minute	TBA	TBA	27 April 2013	
44	11	Shinhwa	TBA	TBA	4 May 2013	
45	12	Yoon Je-moon	TBA	TBA	11 May 2013	
46	13	SNL cast	Jason Mraz	Junseok Lee; Song Chong-Gug; JK Kim Dong-wook; Younha; Sam Hammington; Hong Seok-cheon	18 May 2013	
47	14	Park Yong-woo	TBA	TBA	25 May 2013	
48	15	MBLAQ	TBA	TBA	1 June 2013	
49	16	Ivy	Ivy	TBA	8 June 2013	
50	17	Lee Beom-soo	TBA	Miranda Kerr; Sean Lee; Lee Joon (MBLAQ)	15 June 2013	
51	18	(none)	TBA	TBA	22 June 2013	
52	19	Bong Tae-gyu	TBA	Jessica Gomez	13 July 2013	
53	20	Kim Wan-sun	TBA	Lee Eun-gyeol	20 July 2013	
54	21	Han Jung-soo & Jo Dong-hyuk	TBA	TBA	27 July 2013	
55	22	Kim Gura	TBA	Crayon Pop	3 August 2013	
56	23	Choi Soo-jong	TBA	Yoo Se-yoon	10 August 2013	
57	24	Koyote	TBA	TBA	17 August 2013	
58	25	(none)	TBA	TBA	24 August 2013	TBA
59	26	Jang Hyuk	TBA	TBA	31 August 2013	
60	27	Seungri	TBA	TBA	7 September 2013	
61	28	Hye Park; Kyung-ah Song; Han Jin	TBA	TBA	14 September 2013	
62	29	(none) (Note: Chuseok Special)	TBA	Seungri	21 September 2013	
63	30	G.NA	TBA	BTOB	28 September 2013	
64	31	Im Chang-jung	TBA	TBA	5 October 2013	
65	32	Jaurim	Jaurim	TBA	12 October 2013	
66	33	Jung Kyung-ho	TBA	Tom Hiddleston	19 October 2013	
67	34	(none)	TBA	TBA	26 October 2013	
68	35	Han Eun-jung	TBA	TBA	2 November 2013	
69	36	Kim Gyu-ri	TBA	Block B	9 November 2013	
70	37	Kahi	TBA	Lizzy & Nana (After School)	16 November 2013	
71	38	(none)	TBA	Son Ho-jun	23 November 2013	

=== Season 5 (2014) ===
No. overall	No. in season	Host(s)	Guest(s)	Original release date	Ref(s)
72	1	SNL Korea Return 2014	Yoon Hyung-bin, Seo Doo-Won, Song Ga-yeon, Kim Jae-kyung, Park Gwang-hyun, Hong Jin Ho	1 March 2014	
73	2	Park Sung-woong	Kim Buseon, Choi Hee, Bong Seo-Young, Hong Jin-ho	8 March 2014	
74	3	Park Ji-yoon	Dohee (Tiny-G)	15 March 2014	
75	4	Jeong Jun-ha	TBA	22 March 2014	
76	5	Jung Sung-hwa	Seo Eunkwang (BtoB)	29 March 2014	
77	6	DJ DOC	TBA	5 April 2014	
78	7	Joo Byung-jin	Noh Sa-yeon	12 April 2014	
79	8	Jo Sungmo	TBA	24 May 2014	
80	9	Lee Hwi-jae	Bae Gi-seong	31 May 2014	
81	10	Ryu Hyun-kyung	Jung-yup (Brown Eyed Soul)	7 June 2014	
82	11	On Ju-wan	Lee Chun-soo	14 June 2014	
83	12	Kim Kwang-kyu	AOA, Lee Guk-joo	21 June 2014	
84	13	Jung Joon-young	Choi Chang-hwan	28 June 2014	
85	14	Shin Hae-chul	Hong Seok-cheon	5 July 2014	
86	15	Moon Hee-joon	Lady Jane, Yoo Hyeon-sang	12 July 2014	
87	16	Dynamic Duo	DJ Premier	19 July 2014	
88	17	Yoo Se-yoon; Yoo Sang-mu; Jang Dong-min	TBA	26 July 2014	
89	18	(none)	Shin Soo-ji, Enes Kaya	2 August 2014	
90	19	Lee Guk-joo	Nam Joo-hyuk	9 August 2014	
91	20	(none)	TBA	16 August 2014	
92	21	Secret	TBA	23 August 2014	
93	22	Kim Min-jun	TBA	30 August 2014	
94	23	Cho Young-nam	TBA	6 September 2014	
95	24	Hong Jin-kyeong	TBA	13 September 2014	
96	25	Sistar	TBA	20 September 2014	
97	26	Kang Yong-suk	TBA	27 September 2014	
98	27	Kim Ji-hoon & Lee Yoo-ri	TBA	4 October 2014	
99	28	Girl's Day	TBA	11 October 2014	
100	29	Joon Park	TBA	18 October 2014	
101	30	Daniel Snoeks; Fabien; Ryohei Otani	TBA	25 October 2014	
102	31	Shin Sung-woo	TBA	1 November 2014	
103	32	Song Jae-rim	Zico (Block B)	8 November 2014	
104	33	Kim Bum-soo	Lena Park	15 November 2014	
105	34	Lee Sang-min	TBA	22 November 2014	
106	35	Yoon Sang-hyun	Chae Yeon	29 November 2014	

=== Season 6 (2015) ===
No. overall	No. in season	Host(s)	Guest(s)	Original release date	Ref(s)
107	1	(none)	Tiger JK, Zhang Yu'an, Rubber Soul	14 February 2015	
108	2	Shim Hyung-rae	EXID	21 February 2015	
109	3	Ailee	Kim Pung	28 February 2015	
110	4	Haha	Kim Oak-jeong, Niel	7 March 2015	
111	5	Jin Goo	Shim Hyung-tak	14 March 2015	
112	6	Chae Jung-an	Yoo Seung-ok	21 March 2015	
113	7	Amber	Laboum	28 March 2015	
114	8	Gain	(none)	4 April 2015	
115	9	Kim Hee-won	(none)	11 April 2015	
116	10	Lee Kyu-han	Kim Sang, Madtown, Sam Okyere	18 April 2015	
117	11	Hong Seok-cheon; Raymon Kim; Sam Kim	MC Ding Dong, Maeng Gi-yong	25 April 2015	
118	12	Son Ho-jun	Bob Sapp, Lee Jong-soo, Heo Jun, Park Si-hwan, Jessi	2 May 2015	
119	13	EXID	Lee Ji-hye, Eric Nam, An Yoon-sang, Yoo Byung-jae, Shinsadong Tiger	9 May 2015	
120	14	Kim Byung-man	Lee Soo-geun	16 May 2015	
121	15	Kang Kyun-sung	Chloë Grace Moretz, Eric Nam, Navi	23 May 2015	
122	16	SHINee	(none)	30 May 2015	
123	17	Jun Hyoseong	Oh Ji-heon, Hong Dae Kwang, Lee Soo-geun	6 June 2015	
124	18	Kim Gun-mo	Lee Ji-hyun	13 June 2015	
125	-	Digital Short Special	(none)	20 June 2015	
126	19	Kim Sang-joong	Seventeen	26 September 2015	
127	20	YB	Anda	3 October 2015	
128	21	Wonder Girls	Yuk Jidam	10 October 2015	
129	22	Ryu Seung-soo	Basick	17 October 2015	
130	23	Kim Young-chul	Kim Hyong-uk, Stephanie	24 October 2015	
131	24	Jang Seo-hee	Park Hae-mi	31 October 2015	
132	25	Lee Tae-im	Kim Sang-hyuk, Choi Gun	7 November 2015	
133	26	Kwon Yul	Fiestar	14 November 2015	
134	27	Im Won-hee	Kang Ye-bin, Heo Sol-ji, Ah-in Park, Anda	21 November 2015	
135	28	AOA	Jang Dong-min	28 November 2015	
136	29	Lee Hong-gi	Nine Muses (Kyungri, Euaerin)	5 December 2015	
137	30	Shim Hyung-tak	Min Do-hee, Laboum	12 December 2015	
138	31	Park Na-rae; Jang Do-yeon	Ray Yang	19 December 2015	
139	32	(none)(Christmas special)	Lee Sang-min	26 December 2015	

=== Season 7 (2016) ===
No. overall	No. in season	Host(s)	Guest(s)	Original release date	Ref(s)
140	1	(none)	Lee Tae-min, Ha Sang Wook	27 February 2016	
141	2	Lee Hanee	Chloë Grace Moretz, Lee Han-wi	5 March 2016	
142	3	Namkoong Min	Margaret Cho	12 March 2016	
143	4	Yoon Jung-soo	Kim Sook, Lee Sook, Kim Gura, Yoo Seung-ok, Kim Sung Soo	19 March 2016	
144	5	Block B	(none)	26 March 2016	
145	6	Son Tae-young	Jo Jung-min, Hong Jin-ho	2 April 2016	
146	7	Lee Jung-jin	Jackson Wang	9 April 2016	
147	8	Eric Nam	Zhang Yu'an	16 April 2016	
148	9	Tak Jae-hoon	Muzie	23 April 2016	
149	10	Hong Soo-ah	Ken Jeong	30 April 2016	
150	11	I.O.I	Mario, Lee Ji-hye	7 May 2016	
151	12	Moon Jeong-hee	Berry Good (Taeha, Daye, Sehyung and Gowoon)	14 May 2016	
152	13	Nam Bo-ra	TBA	21 May 2016	
153	14	Tiffany	Dana	28 May 2016	
154	15	Jonghyun	Luna	4 June 2016	
155	16	Jay Park, Simon Dominic, Loco, Gray	Yang Jung Won	11 June 2016	
156	17	Lee El	Jung Chae-yeon	18 June 2016	
157	18	Lee Kyung-kyu	(none)	25 June 2016	

=== Season 8 (2016) ===
No. overall	No. in season	Host(s)	Guest(s)	Original release date	Ref(s)
158	1	Bang Min-ah	(none)	3 September 2016	
159	2	2PM	(none)	10 September 2016	
160	3	Yang Se-hyung	(none)	17 September 2016	
161	4	Jang Hyun-sung	Ahn Sol-bin (Laboum)	24 September 2016	
162	5	Lee Sun-bin	(none)	1 October 2016	
163	6	Lee Mi-do	Hwayobi	8 October 2016	
164	7	Kim Min-seok	(none)	15 October 2016	
165	8	Infinite	(none)	22 October 2016	
166	9	Twice	(none)	29 October 2016	
167	10	Sol Bi	(none)	5 November 2016	
168	11	Hwang Woo-seul-hye	Min Jin-woong	12 November 2016	
169	12	Lee Si-eon	Johyun (Berry Good)	19 November 2016	
170	13	B1A4	(none)	26 November 2016	
171	14	Mamamoo	Hyebin (Momoland)	3 December 2016	
172	15	Lee Soo-geun	Hyoyeon	10 December 2016	
173	16	Sunwoo Sun	TBA	17 December 2016	
174	17	Hwang Chi-yeul	Kim Dong Woo	24 December 2016	

=== Season 9 (2017) ===
No. overall	No. in season	Host(s)	Guest(s)	Original release date	Ref(s)
175	1	Choi Soo-young	(none)	25 March 2017	
176	2	Im Soo-hyang	Robert Holley	1 April 2017	
177	3	gugudan	(none)	8 April 2017	
178	4	Choi Tae-joon	Jang Jae-in	15 April 2017	
179	5	Kim Jong-min	(none)	22 April 2017	
180	6	Kim So-yeon	(none)	29 April 2017	
181	7	Kim Joon-ho	(none)	6 May 2017	
182	8	Jung Hye-sung	(none)	13 May 2017	
183	9	Kim Ye-won	(none)	20 May 2017	
184	10	Hyun Woo	Lim Eun-kyung	27 May 2017	
185	11	Choi Jung-won	LJ, UV x Shindong	3 June 2017	
186	12	Kim Seo-hyung	Sunwoo Yong-nyeo	10 June 2017	
187	13	Roy Kim	(none)	17 June 2017	
188	14	T-ara	Jang Moon-bok (Produce 101 Season 2 contestants)	24 June 2017	
189	15	Apink	(none)	1 July 2017	
190	16	Park Soo-hong	Ahn Sol-bin (Laboum)	8 July 2017	
191	17	Red Velvet	(none)	22 July 2017	
192	18	Kim Sung-oh	(none)	29 July 2017	
193	19	Hong Jin-young	(none)	5 August 2017	
194	20	Wanna One	(none)	12 August 2017	
195	21	Wanna One	(none)	16 August 2017	
196	22	Yoon Se-ah	(none)	26 August 2017	
197	23	Tony An	(none)	2 September 2017	
198	24	GFriend	Onesun	9 September 2017	
199	25	Lee Chae-young	(none)	16 September 2017	
200	26	Kim Saeng-min	(none)	23 September 2017	
201	27	Choo Sung-hoon	(none)	30 September 2017	
202	28	DIA	(none)	14 October 2017	
203	29	Tasty Guys cast	(none)	21 October 2017	
204	30	Lee Tae-im	JBJ	28 October 2017	
205	31	Song Eun-i, Kim Sook	(none)	4 November 2017	
206	32	Super Junior (Leeteuk, Yesung, Shindong, Eunhyuk, Donghae)	Heechul	11 November 2017	
207	33	SNL cast	TBA	18 November 2017	

=== Season 10 (2021) ===
Beginning with this season, all episodes of SNL Korea are aired exclusively on the streaming platform Coupang Play.

No. overall	No. in season	Host(s)	Guest(s)	Original release date	Ref(s)
208	1	Lee Byung-hun	(none)	4 September 2021	
209	2	Ha Ji-won	(none)	11 September 2021	
210	3	Cho Jung-suk	(none)	18 September 2021	
211	4	Jessi	(none)	25 September 2021	
212	5	Cho Yeo-jeong	(none)	2 October 2021	
213	6	NCT 127	(none)	9 October 2021	
214	7	Ock Joo-hyun	(none)	16 October 2021	
215	8	Kim Dong-wook	(none)	23 October 2021	
216	9	Yoon Kye-sang	(none)	30 October 2021	
217	10	Cho Jin-woong	(none)	6 November 2021	

=== Season 11 (2021–22) ===
No. overall	No. in season	Host(s)	Guest(s)	Original release date	Ref(s)
209	1	Shin Hye-sun	(none)	25 December 2021	
210	2	Cha In-pyo	(none)	1 January 2022	
211	3	Lee Sun-bin, Han Sun-hwa, Jung Eun-ji	(none)	8 January 2022	
212	4	Kang Ha-neul	(none)	15 January 2022	
213	5	Lee Dong-hwi	(none)	22 January 2022	
214	6	Heo Sung-tae	(none)	29 January 2022	
215	7	Hwasa	(none)	12 February 2022	
216	8	Kim Ji-seok	(none)	26 February 2022	
217	9	Gabee, Aiki, Monika, Lip J	(none)	5 March 2022	
218	10	Jung Il-woo	(none)	19 March 2022	
219	11	Jay Park	(none)	26 March 2022	
220	12	WINNER	(none)	2 April 2022	
221	13	Park Ha-sun	(none)	9 April 2022	
222	14	Oh Na-ra	(none)	16 April 2022	
223	15	Brave Girls	(none)	23 April 2022	
224	16	Lee Sang-yeob	(none)	30 April 2022	
225	17	Im Chang-jung	(none)	2 May 2022	
226	18	Jo Sung-ha	(none)	14 May 2022	
227	19	Song Ga-in	(none)	21 May 2022	
228	20	SNL Korea cast	Moon Se-yoon, Kwak Yoon-gy, Um Ji-yoon	28 May 2022	

=== Season 12 (2022–2023) ===
No. overall	No. in season	Host(s)	Original release date	Ref(s)
229	1	Song Seung-heon	19 November 2022	
230	2	Lee Eun-ji, Um Ji-yoon, Mimi (Oh My Girl)	26 November 2022	
231	3	Chae Soo-bin	3 December 2022	
232	4	Zico	10 December 2022	
233	5	Jang Yoon-ju	17 December 2022	
234	6	Park Hae-soo	24 December 2022	
235	7	Kim Seul-gi	31 December 2022	
236	8	Kim Ok-bin	7 January 2023	
237	9	Go Soo	14 January 2023	
Special	Special	(none)	21 January 2023	
238	10	Jang Keun-suk	28 January 2023	

=== Season 13 (2023) ===
No. overall	No. in season	Host(s)	Original release date	Ref(s)
239	1	Jung Woo	15 July 2023	
240	2	Han Ye-ri	22 July 2023	
241	3	Ko Kyu-pil	29 July 2023	
242	4	Jung Woo-sung	5 August 2023	
243	5	Lee Da-hee	12 August 2023	
244	6	Sung Si-kyung	19 August 2023	
245	7	Jin Seo-yeon	26 August 2023	
246	8	Chang Kiha	2 September 2023	
247	9	Daniel Henney	16 September 2023 (Note: There was a planned episode on September 9, 2023, with Kim Hieora as host. However, due to a controversy related to her, the episode was cancelled.)	

=== Season 14 (2024) ===
No. overall	No. in season	Host(s)	Original release date	Ref(s)
248	1	Yim Si-wan	2 March 2024	
249	2	Lee Yoo-mi	9 March 2024	
250	3	Park Ji-hwan	16 March 2024	
251	4	Han Ye-seul	23 March 2024	
252	5	Hwang Jung-eum	30 March 2024	
253	6	Lee So-ra	6 April 2024	
254	7	Kang Tae-oh	13 April 2024	
255	8	Lee Hee-joon	20 April 2024	
256	9	Kian84	27 April 2024	
257	10	Lee Ji-ah	4 May 2024	

=== Season 15 (2024) ===
No. overall	No. in season	Host(s)	Original release date	Ref(s)
258	1	Jeon Jong-seo	31 August 2024	
259	2	Kim Sung-kyun	7 September 2024	
260	3	Kwak Dong-yeon	14 September 2024	
261	4	Moon Sang-hoon	21 September 2024	
262	5	Kim Shin-rok	28 September 2024	
263	6	Joo Won	5 October 2024	
264	7	Rain	12 October 2024	
265	8	Kim Eui-sung	19 October 2024	
266	9	Go Joon-hee	26 October 2024	
267	10	Jin Seon-kyu	2 November 2024	

=== Season 16 (2025) ===
No. overall	No. in season	Host(s)	Original release date	Ref(s)
268	1	Ha Jung-woo	5 April 2025	
269	2	Seo Yea-ji	12 April 2025	
270	3	Yoon Kyung-ho	19 April 2025	
271	4	Kim Sa-rang	26 April 2025	
272	5	Hyun Bong-sik	3 May 2025	
273	6	Moon Chae-won	10 May 2025	
274	7	Ahn Jae-hong	17 May 2025	
275	8	Bae Seong-woo	24 May 2025	
276	9	Park Ju-hyun	31 May 2025	
277	10	Yook Sung-jae	7 June 2025	

=== Season 17 (2026) ===
No. overall	No. in season	Host(s)	Original release date	Ref(s)
278	1	Tak Jae-hoon	28 March 2026	
279	2	Go Ah-sung	4 April 2026	
280	3	Song Ji-hyo	11 April 2026	
281	4	Lee Mi-sook	18 April 2026	
282	5	Shin Sung-rok	25 April 2026	
283	6	Choo Sung-hoon	2 May 2026	
284	7	Han Ga-in	9 May 2026	
285	8	Lee Jung-eun	16 May 2026	
286	9	Jung Soo-jung	23 May 2026	
287	10	Uhm Ji-won	30 May 2026	
