= Dancing with the Stars (South Korean TV series) season 3 =

Dancing with the Stars
- Season 3
- Celebrity winner: Fei
- Professional winner: Kim Su-ro
- No. of episodes: 12

Release
- Original network: MBC TV
- Original release: March 15 – May 31, 2013

Season chronology
- ← Previous; Season 2

Dancing with the Stars: Season 3 (Korean: 댄싱 위드 더 스타3) was the third season of the Korean TV show based on the British television series Strictly Come Dancing. The hosts were Lee Deok-hwa and Kim Gyu-ri.

== Couples ==
Celebrity	Occupation	Professional partner	Status
Hye Park	Model	Zegna	Eliminated 1st on March 22, 2013
Jeanette Lee	Pool player	Lee Hoo-sun	Eliminated 2nd on March 29, 2013
Oh Mi-hee	Actor	Kim Sang-min	Eliminated 3rd on April 5, 2013
Lee Jong-won	Actor	Lee Chae-won	Eliminated 4th on April 12, 2013
Woo Ji-Won	Basketball player	Choi Song-hwa	Eliminated 5th on April 19, 2013
Seungho	MBLAQ singer	Son Jin-joo	Eliminated 6th on April 26, 2013
Nam Bo-ra	Actor	Kwon Sun-yong	Eliminated 7th on May 3, 2013
Kim Dae-ho	TV Host	Choi Soo-jeong	Eliminated 8th on May 10, 2013
Kim Wan-sun	Pop icon	Kim Hyung-suk	Eliminated 8th on May 17, 2013
Lee Eun-gyeol	Magician	Lee Jung-hyun	Third place on May 24, 2013
Kim Kyung-ho	Rock singer	Ahn Hye-sang	Runner-up on May 31, 2013
Fei	Miss A singer	Kim Su-ro	Winner on May 31, 2013

== Scores ==
Couple	Place	1	2	1+2	3	4	5	6	7	8	9	10	11	12
Fei & Su-ro	1	19	21	40	23	24	22	23	24	26	24	27+28=55	27+29=56	28+29=57
Kyung-ho & Hye-sang	2	20	20	40	21	19	21	22	23	23	23	23+25=48	25+26=51	27+27=54
Eun-gyeol & Jung-hyun	3	21	20	41	23	23	23	24	23	24	26	25+26=51	24+29=53	
Wan-sun & Hyung-suk	4	22	21	43	21	22	20	24	25	25	23	25+25=50		
Dae-ho & Soo-jeong	5	18	20	38	20	21	20	20	21	23	21			
Bo-ra & Sun-yong	6	19	21	40	20	20	19	22	24	23				
Seungho & Jin-joo	7	19	20	39	20	22	22	23	20					
Ji-won & Song-hwa	8	19	20	39	20	19	17	20						
Jong-won & Chae-won	9	21	21	42	21	21	19							
Mi-hee & Sang-min	10	20	20	40	20	19								
Jeanette & Hoo-sun	11	18	21	39	19									
Hye & Zegna	12	19	20	39										

Red numbers indicate the lowest score for each week.
Green numbers indicate the highest score for each week.
indicates the couple eliminated that week.
indicates the winning couple (the couple that received the highest combined total of judges' scores and viewers' votes).
indicates the runner-up couple.
indicates the third-place couple.

== Averages ==
This table only counts dances scored on the traditional 30-points scale.

Rank by average	Place	Couple	Total points	Number of dances	Average
1	1	Fei & Kim Su-ro	374	15	24.93
2	3	Lee Eun-gyeol & Lee Jung-hyun	311	13	23.92
3	2	Kim Kyung-ho & Ahn Hye-sang	345	15	23.00
3	4	Kim Wan-sun & Kim Hyung-suk	253	11	23.00
5	6	Nam Bo-ra & Kwon Sun-yong	168	8	21.00
6	7	Seungho & Son Jin-joo	146	7	20.86
7	9	Lee Jong-won & Lee Chae-won	103	5	20.60
8	5	Kim Dae-ho & Choi Soo-jeong	184	9	20.44
9	10	Oh Mi-hee & Kim Sang-min	79	4	19.75
10	12	Hye Park & Zegna	39	2	19.50
11	11	Jeanette Lee & Lee Hoo-sun	58	3	19.33
12	8	Woo Ji-won & Choi Song-hwa	115	6	19.17

== Highest and lowest scoring performances ==
The best and worst performances in each dance according to the judges' marks are as follows:

Dance	Best dancer(s)	Best score	Worst dancer(s)	Worst score
Swing	Lee Jong-won	21	Fei	19
Samba	Fei	28	Lee Jong-won	19
Jive	Fei	27	Nam Bo-ra; Woo Ji-Won; Kim Kyung-ho	19
Tango	Kim Wan-sun	25	Lee Jong-won; Nam Bo-ra; Kim Dae-ho	21
Rumba	Fei	26	Hye Park	19
Quickstep	Fei	22	Woo Ji-Won	17
Waltz	Seungho	22	Oh Mi-hee	19
Paso Doble	Fei	28	Nam Bo-ra	19
Viennese Waltz	Nam Bo-ra	22	Seungho	19
Salsa	Lee Eun-gyeol	24	Jeanette Lee	18
Foxtrot	Hye Park	20	Kim Dae-ho	18
Cha-cha-cha	Fei	29	Kim Dae-ho; Oh Mi-hee; Nam Bo-ra	20
Fusion	Lee Eun-gyeol	26	Kim Dae-ho	21
Latin-based Freestyle	Fei; Lee Eun-gyeol	29	Kim Kyung-ho	26

== Couples' Highest and Lowest Scoring Dances ==
According to the traditional 30-point scale:

Couples	Highest Scoring Dance(s)	Score	Lowest Scoring Dance(s)	Score
Fei & Kim Su-ro	Samba Freestyle & Cha-cha-cha	29	Swing	19
Kim Kyung-ho & Ahn Hye-sang	Samba & Paso Doble	27	Jive	19
Lee Eun-gyeol & Lee Jung-hyun	Rumba Freestyle	29	Quickstep	20
Kim Wan-sun & Kim Hyung-suk	Cha-cha-cha, Tango and Paso Doble	25	Quickstep	20
Kim Dae-ho & Choi Soo-jeong	Paso Doble	23	Foxtrot	18
Nam Bo-ra & Kwon Sun-yong	Cha-cha-cha	24	Jive & Paso Doble	19
Seungho & Son Jin-joo	Paso Doble	23	Viennese Waltz	19
Woo Ji-won & Choi Song-hwa	Paso Doble, Rumba and Samba	20	Quickstep	17
Lee Jong-won & Lee Chae-won	Tango, Swing, Cha-cha-cha and Waltz	21	Samba	19
Oh Mi-hee & Kim Sang-min	Waltz, Salsa and Cha-cha-cha	20	Waltz	19
Jeanette Lee & Lee Hoo-sun	Waltz	21	Salsa	18
Hye Park & Zegna	Foxtrot	20	Rumba	19

== Weekly scores and songs ==
Unless indicated otherwise, individual judges scores in the charts below (given in parentheses) are listed in this order from left to right: Park Sang-won, Alex Kim, Kim Joo-won.

=== Week 1 ===
Running order

Couple	Score	Dance	Music
Fei & Kim Su-ro	19 (6,6,7)	Swing	"Puttin' On The Ritz" — Irving Berlin
Kim Kyung-ho & Ahn Hye-sang	20 (7,6,7)	Samba	"말해줘 (Tell Me)" – Jinusean featuring Uhm Jung-hwa
Nam Bo-ra & Kwon Sun-yong	19 (7,6,6)	Jive	"Waterloo" – ABBA
Lee Jong-won & Lee Chae-won	21 (7,7,7)	Tango	"Viva la Vida" – Coldplay
Hye Park & Zegna	19 (7,6,6)	Rumba	"If I Were a Boy" — Beyoncé
Woo Ji-won & Choi Song-hwa	19 (7,6,6)	Quickstep	"9 to 5" – Dolly Parton
Oh Mi-hee & Kim Sang-min	20 (7,6,7)	Waltz	"When I Need You" — Rod Stewart
Lee Eun-gyeol & Lee Jung-hyun	21 (7,7,7)	Paso Doble	"난 남자다 (I'm a Man)" – Kim Jang-hoon
Seungho & Son Jin-joo	19 (6,6,7)	Viennese Waltz	"Scarborough Fair" – Simon & Garfunkel
Jeanette Lee & Lee Hoo-sun	18 (7,5,6)	Salsa	"Fly Me to the Moon" — Frank Sinatra
Kim Dae-ho & Choi Soo-jeong	18 (6,6,6)	Foxtrot	"Can't Smile Without You" – Barry Manilow
Kim Wan-sun & Kim Hyung-suk	22 (7,7,8)	Cha-cha-cha	"Hands Up (Give Me Your Heart)" – Ottawan

=== Week 2 ===
Running order

Couple	Score	Dance	Music	Result
Lee Eun-gyeol & Lee Jung-hyun	20 (7,6,7)	Quickstep	"첫인상 (First Impressions)" – Kim Gun-mo	Safe
Kim Wan-sun & Kim Hyung-suk	21 (7,7,7)	Rumba	"Hello" — Lionel Richie	Safe
Lee Jong-won & Lee Chae-won	21 (7,6,8)	Swing	"새들처럼 (Like the Birds)" – Byun Jin-sup ft. F.T. Island	Safe
Oh Mi-hee & Kim Sang-min	20 (7,6,7)	Salsa	"Just the Two of Us" – Grover Washington, Jr. & Bill Withers	Safe
Kim Dae-ho & Choi Soo-jeong	20 (7,6,7)	Cha-cha-cha	"Daddy Cool" – Boney M.	Safe
Fei & Kim Su-ro	21 (7,6,8)	Samba	"Flashdance... What a Feeling" — Irene Cara	Safe
Seungho & Son Jin-joo	20 (7,6,7)	Jive	"The Lion Sleeps Tonight" – The Tokens	Safe
Hye Park & Zegna	20 (7,6,7)	Foxtrot	"The Wayfaring Stranger" – Emmylou Harris	Eliminated
Kim Kyung-ho & Ahn Hye-sang	20 (7,6,7)	Viennese Waltz	"A Whiter Shade of Pale" — Procol Harum	Winner
Nam Bo-ra & Kwon Sun-yong	21 (7,7,7)	Tango	"Moves Like Jagger" — Maroon 5 ft. Christina Aguilera	Safe
Woo Ji-won & Choi Song-hwa	20 (7,6,7)	Paso Doble	"붉은 노을 (The Red Glow)" – Lee Moon-se	Safe
Jeanette Lee & Lee Hoo-sun	21 (8,6,7)	Waltz	"보고싶다 (I Miss You)" – Kim Bum-soo	Safe

=== Week 3 ===
Running order

Couple	Score	Dance	Music	Result
Oh Mi-hee & Kim Sang-min	20 (8,5,7)	Cha-cha-cha	"One Way Ticket" – Eruption	Safe
Woo Ji-won & Choi Song-hwa	20 (7,6,7)	Rumba	"I'm Your Man" – Leonard Cohen	Safe
Lee Eun-gyeol & Lee Jung-hyun	23 (8,7,8)	Salsa	"The Tide Is High" – Blondie	Safe
Kim Wan-sun & Kim Hyung-suk	21 (8,6,7)	Cha-cha-cha	"Stand by Me" – John Lennon	Safe
Seungho & Son Jin-joo	20 (7,6,7)	Rumba	"Killing Me Softly with His Song" – Roberta Flack	Safe
Jeanette Lee & Lee Hoo-sun	19 (7,5,7)	Salsa	"With Me" – Wheesung	Eliminated
Lee Jong-won & Lee Chae-won	21 (7,6,8)	Cha-cha-cha	"Le Freak" – Chic	Safe
Kim Dae-ho & Choi Soo-jeong	20 (7,6,7)	Rumba	"I Believe I Can Fly" – R. Kelly	Safe
Kim Kyung-ho & Ahn Hye-sang	21 (7,7,7)	Salsa	"La Isla Bonita" — Madonna	Winner
Fei & Kim Su-ro	23 (8,7,8)	Rumba	"Nobody" – Wonder Girls	Safe
Nam Bo-ra & Kwon Sun-yong	20 (7,6,7)	Cha-cha-cha	"Yes Sir, I Can Boogie" – Baccara	Safe

=== Week 4 ===
Running order

Couple	Score	Dance	Music	Result
Kim Dae-ho & Choi Soo-jeong	21 (7,6,8)	Jive	"Call Me" – Nikka Costa	Safe
Oh Mi-hee & Kim Sang-min	19 (7,5,7)	Waltz	"Yesterday" – The Beatles	Eliminated
Kim Wan-sun & Kim Hyung-suk	22 (8,6,8)	Tango	"Abracadabra" – Steve Miller Band	Safe
Nam Bo-ra & Kwon Sun-yong	20 (7,6,7)	Jive	"Crocodile Rock" – Elton John	Safe
Seungho & Son Jin-joo	22 (8,7,7)	Waltz	"Only You (And You Alone)" – The Platters	Safe
Lee Eun-gyeol & Lee Jung-hyun	23 (8,7,8)	Tango	"보여줄게 (I'll Show You)" – Ailee	Safe
Woo Ji-won & Choi Song-hwa	19 (7,5,7)	Jive	"The Loco-Motion" – Kylie Minogue	Safe
Lee Jong-won & Lee Chae-won	21 (7,6,8)	Waltz	"Sailing" – Rod Stewart	Safe
Fei & Kim Su-ro	24 (9,7,8)	Tango	"Tragedy" – Bee Gees	Winner
Kim Kyung-ho & Ahn Hye-sang	19 (7,6,6)	Jive	"Wake Me Up Before You Go-Go" — Wham!	Safe

=== Week 5 ===
Running order

Couple	Score	Dance	Music	Result
Kim Kyung-ho & Ahn Hye-sang	21 (7,6,8)	Samba	"El Bimbo" – Paul Mauriat	Safe
Fei & Kim Su-ro	22 (8,6,8)	Quickstep	"Mambo No. 5" – Lou Bega	Safe
Nam Bo-ra & Kwon Sun-yong	19 (7,6,6)	Paso Doble	"Wanted" – The Dooleys	Safe
Lee Jong-won & Lee Chae-won	19 (7,5,7)	Samba	"Brother Louie" – Modern Talking	Eliminated
Woo Ji-won & Choi Song-hwa	17 (6,5,6)	Quickstep	"Sea of Heartbreak" – Poco	Safe
Seungho & Son Jin-joo	22 (8,7,7)	Paso Doble	"Lay All Your Love on Me" – ABBA	Winner
Kim Dae-ho & Choi Soo-jeong	20 (7,6,7)	Samba	"Belfast" – Boney M.	Safe
Kim Wan-sun & Kim Hyung-suk	20 (7,6,7)	Quickstep	"She Bop" – Cyndi Lauper	Safe
Lee Eun-gyeol & Lee Jung-hyun	23 (8,7,8)	Paso Doble	"The Final Countdown" — Europe	Safe

=== Week 6: Movie Week ===
Running order

Couple	Score	Dance	Music	Movie	Result
Kim Dae-ho & Choi Soo-jeong	20 (7,6,7)	Swing	"All You Need Is Love" – Lynden David Hall	Love Actually	Safe
Kim Wan-sun & Kim Hyung-suk	24 (8,8,8)	Cha-cha-cha	"Fame" – Naturi Naughton	Fame	Winner
Nam Bo-ra & Kwon Sun-yong	22 (8,7,7)	Viennese Waltz	"When a Man Loves a Woman" – Percy Sledge	When a Man Loves a Woman	Safe
Kim Kyung-ho & Ahn Hye-sang	22 (7,7,8)	Jive	"Footloose" – Kenny Loggins	Footloose	Safe
Fei & Kim Su-ro	23 (8,7,8)	Tango	"I Will Follow Him" – Little Peggy March	Sister Act	Safe
Lee Eun-gyeol & Lee Jung-hyun	24 (8,8,8)	Salsa	"Turn the Beat Around" – Gloria Estefan	The Specialist	Safe
Woo Ji-won & Choi Song-hwa	20 (7,6,7)	Samba	"Under the Sea" – Samuel E. Wright	The Little Mermaid	Eliminated
Seungho & Son Jin-joo	23 (8,7,8)	Paso Doble	"Americano" – Lady Gaga	Puss in Boots	Safe

=== Week 7: 70s and 80s Week ===
Running order

Couple	Score	Dance	Music	Result
Kim Wan-sun & Kim Hyung-suk	25 (8,8,9)	Cha-cha-cha	"Happy Song" – Boney M. and Bobby Farrell with the School Rebels	Winner
Lee Eun-gyeol & Lee Jung-hyun	23 (8,7,8)	Rumba	"We're All Alone" – Rita Coolidge	Safe
Kim Kyung-ho & Ahn Hye-sang	23 (8,7,8)	Tango	"Don't Bring Me Down" – Electric Light Orchestra	Safe
Nam Bo-ra & Kwon Sun-yong	24 (8,7,9)	Cha-cha-cha	"Be My Lover" – La Bouche	Safe
Seungho & Son Jin-joo	20 (7,6,7)	Rumba	"Woman in Love" – Barbra Streisand	Eliminated
Kim Dae-ho & Choi Soo-jeong	21 (7,6,8)	Tango	"Harlem Desire" – London Boys	Safe
Fei & Kim Su-ro	24 (8,8,8)	Cha-cha-cha	"In the Navy" – Village People	Safe

=== Week 8: Personal Story Week ===
Running order

Couple	Score	Dance	Music	Result
Kim Wan-sun & Kim Hyung-suk	25 (8,8,9)	Tango	"Libertango" – Ástor Piazzolla	Safe
Kim Kyung-ho & Ahn Hye-sang	23 (7,8,8)	Cha-cha-cha	"Now" – Kim Kyung-ho	Safe
Lee Eun-gyeol & Lee Jung-hyun	24 (8,8,8)	Rumba	"Miracle Drug" – U2	Safe
Fei & Kim Su-ro	26 (9,8,9)	Rumba	"The Moon Represents My Heart" – Teresa Teng	Winner
Nam Bo-ra & Kwon Sun-yong	23 (8,7,8)	Rumba	"기억의 습작 (An Essay of Memory)" – Kim Dong-ryool	Eliminated
Kim Dae-ho & Choi Soo-jeong	23 (8,7,8)	Paso Doble	"He's a Pirate" – Hans Zimmer	Safe

=== Week 9: Fusion Week ===
Running order

Couple	Score	Fusion	Music	Result
Fei & Kim Su-ro	24 (8,8,8)	Viennese Waltz; Paso Doble	"Don't Cry for Me Argentina" – Madonna	Safe
Lee Eun-gyeol & Lee Jung-hyun	26 (9,8,9)	Swing; Rumba	"When a Child Is Born" – Boney M.	Safe
Kim Wan-sun & Kim Hyung-suk	23 (8,7,8)	Waltz; Cha-cha-cha	"The Sound of Silence" – Simon & Garfunkel	Safe
Kim Dae-ho & Choi Soo-jeong	21 (7,7,7)	Quickstep; Salsa	"You're the One That I Want" — John Travolta & Olivia Newton-John	Eliminated
Kim Kyung-ho & Ahn Hye-sang	23 (8,7,8)	Tango; Jive	"Just the Way You Are" – Bruno Mars	Winner

=== Week 10 ===
Running order

Couple	Score	Dance	Music	Result
Kim Wan-sun & Kim Hyung-suk	25 (8,8,9)	Cha-cha-cha	"(Shake, Shake, Shake) Shake Your Booty" – KC and the Sunshine Band	Eliminated
Kim Wan-sun & Kim Hyung-suk	25 (9,8,8)	Paso Doble	"Monday Morning 5:19" – Rialto	Eliminated
Kim Kyung-ho & Ahn Hye-sang	23 (8,7,8)	Cha-cha-cha	"Baby" – Justin Bieber ft. Ludacris	Safe
Kim Kyung-ho & Ahn Hye-sang	25 (9,8,8)	Paso Doble	"Nathalie" – Julio Iglesias	Safe
Fei & Kim Su-ro	27 (9,8,10)	Cha-cha-cha	"Video Killed the Radio Star" – The Buggles	Winner
Fei & Kim Su-ro	28 (10,9,9)	Paso Doble	"Unstoppable" — E.S. Posthumus "Oops!... I Did It Again" – Britney Spears	Winner
Lee Eun-gyeol & Lee Jung-hyun	25 (9,7,9)	Cha-cha-cha	"U Can't Touch This" – MC Hammer	Safe
Lee Eun-gyeol & Lee Jung-hyun	26 (9,8,9)	Paso Doble	"(I Just) Died in Your Arms" — Cutting Crew	Safe

=== Week 11: Semi-finals ===
Note: As their second dance, every couple performed a Freestyle routine based on a Latin dance they had already performed previously in the competition. Each couple was accompanied by guest singer(s) of their choice.

Running order

Couple	Score	Dance	Music	Result
Fei & Kim Su-ro	27 (9,9,9)	Jive	"Knock on Wood" – Amii Stewart	Safe
Fei & Kim Su-ro	29 (10,9,10)	Samba Freestyle	"Conga" – Miami Sound Machine (performed by 15& and Baek A-yeon)	Safe
Lee Eun-gyeol & Lee Jung-hyun	24 (8,8,8)	Jive	"Don't Be Cruel" – Elvis Presley	Eliminated
Lee Eun-gyeol & Lee Jung-hyun	29 (10,9,10)	Rumba Freestyle	"Creep" — Radiohead (performed by Hong Kyung-min)	Eliminated
Kim Kyung-ho & Ahn Hye-sang	25 (8,8,9)	Jive	"Queen of Hearts" – Juice Newton	Safe
Kim Kyung-ho & Ahn Hye-sang	26 (9,8,9)	Cha-cha-cha Freestyle	"Each and Every Night" – Insooni (performed by Insooni)	Safe

=== Week 12: Finals ===
Note: Both couples performed the Samba as their first dance. For their second dance, the couples were allowed to choose the style they wanted to perform. Fei & Su-ro chose the Cha-cha-cha, while Kyung-ho & Hye-sang chose the Paso Doble.

Running order

Couple	Score	Dance	Music	Result
Fei & Kim Su-ro	28 (9,9,10)	Samba	"Karma Chameleon" – Culture Club	Winner
Fei & Kim Su-ro	29 (10,9,10)	Cha-cha-cha	"Last Night" – Chris Anderson & Dj Robbie	Winner
Kim Kyung-ho & Ahn Hye-sang	27 (9,8,10)	Samba	"TiK ToK" — Ke$ha	Runner-up
Kim Kyung-ho & Ahn Hye-sang	27 (10,8,9)	Paso Doble	"Separate Ways (Worlds Apart)" – Journey	Runner-up

Other performances

Couple	Dance	Music
Oh Mi-hee & Kim Sang-min	Waltz	"Over the Rainbow" – Park Ji-min
Kim Dae-ho & Choi Soo-jeong	Swing	"Swing Baby" – Park Jin-young
Nam Bo-ra & Kwon Sun-yong	Viennese Waltz	"The Last Waltz" – from Oldboy
Kim Wan-sun & Kim Hyung-suk	Cha-cha-cha	"Play That Funky Music" – Wild Cherry
Lee Jong-won & Lee Chae-won	Paso Doble	"Desperado" – Han Dong Geun
Lee Eun-gyeol & Lee Jung-hyun	Paso Doble	"Viva la Vida" – Coldplay
All couples	Group dance	"Bounce" – Cho Yong-pil

== Dance chart ==
The celebrities and professional partners danced one of these routines for each corresponding week:

- Week 1: One unlearned dance
- Week 2: One unlearned dance
- Week 3: Cha-cha-cha or Rumba or Salsa
- Week 4: Waltz or Jive or Tango
- Week 5: Quickstep or Samba or Paso Doble
- Week 6: One unlearned or repeated dance (Movie Week)
- Week 7: One unlearned or repeated dance (70s & 80s Week)
- Week 8: One unlearned or repeated dance (Personal Story Week)
- Week 9: One dance of two combined styles (Fusion)
- Week 10: Cha-cha-cha and Paso Doble
- Week 11: Jive and Freestyle based on a repeated Latin dance
- Week 12: Samba and a repeated Latin dance

Couple	1	2	3	4	5	6	7	8	9	10		11		12	
Fei & Kim Su-ro	Swing	Samba	Rumba	Tango	Quickstep	Tango	Cha-cha-cha	Rumba	Viennese Waltz; Paso Doble	Cha-cha-cha	Paso Doble	Jive	Samba Freestyle	Samba	Cha-cha-cha
Kim Kyung-ho & Ahn Hye-sang	Samba	Viennese Waltz	Salsa	Jive	Samba	Jive	Tango	Cha-cha-cha	Tango; Jive	Cha-cha-cha	Paso Doble	Jive	Cha-cha-cha Freestyle	Samba	Paso Doble
Lee Eun-gyeol & Lee Jung-hyun	Paso Doble	Quickstep	Salsa	Tango	Paso Doble	Salsa	Rumba	Rumba	Swing; Rumba	Cha-cha-cha	Paso Doble	Jive	Rumba Freestyle		Paso Doble
Kim Wan-sun & Kim Hyung-suk	Cha-cha-cha	Rumba	Cha-cha-cha	Tango	Quickstep	Cha-cha-cha	Cha-cha-cha	Tango	Waltz; Cha-cha-cha	Cha-cha-cha	Paso Doble				Cha-cha-cha
Kim Dae-ho & Choi Soo-jeong	Foxtrot	Cha-cha-cha	Rumba	Jive	Samba	Swing	Tango	Paso Doble	Quickstep; Salsa						Swing
Nam Bo-ra & Kwon Sun-yong	Jive	Tango	Cha-cha-cha	Jive	Paso Doble	Viennese Waltz	Cha-cha-cha	Rumba							Viennese Waltz
Seungho & Son Jin-joo	Viennese Waltz	Jive	Rumba	Waltz	Paso Doble	Paso Doble	Rumba								
Woo Ji-won & Choi Song-hwa	Quickstep	Paso Doble	Rumba	Jive	Quickstep	Samba									
Lee Jong-won & Lee Chae-won	Tango	Swing	Cha-cha-cha	Waltz	Samba										Paso Doble
Oh Mi-hee & Kim Sang-min	Waltz	Salsa	Cha-cha-cha	Waltz											Waltz
Jeanette Lee & Lee Hoo-sun	Salsa	Waltz	Salsa												
Hye Park & Zegna	Rumba	Foxtrot													

Highest scoring dance
Lowest scoring dance
Danced, but not scored
