= MasterChef Korea Celebrity =

- Genre: Reality; Variety; Cooking; Game show
- Created by: Franc Roddam
- Directed by: Ha Jeong-seok, Ryoo Hye-joo, Lee Soo-ho
- Judges: Kim Sohyi, Kang Leo, Noh Hee-young
- Narrated by: Seon Ho-je
- Composers: Han Cheol-ho, Lee Min-young, Kim Gook-han
- Country of origin: South Korea
- Original language: Korean
- No. of episodes: 8

Production
- Executive producers: Shin Yoo-jin, Kim Kyung-soo
- Producer: Seok Jeong-ho
- Cinematography: Shin Sung-hwan
- Editor: E-TEAM
- Camera setup: Multi-camera
- Running time: 60 minutes

Original release
- Network: O'live
- Release: February 22 – April 12, 2013

MasterChef Korea Celebrity (Korean: 마스터셰프 코리아 셀러브리티) is a South Korean competitive cooking game show. It is spin-off of MasterChef Korea, itself an adaptation of the British show MasterChef, and features celebrity contestants. The program was broadcast on O'live from February 22 to April 12, 2013 for 8 episodes. The last winner received ₩100,000,000 and a refrigerator of the sponsor as prize.

== Judges ==
- Chef Kim Sohyi
- Chef Kang Leo
- Food marketing expert Noh Hee-young (노희영)

== Competition overview ==
WIN – Winner of the mystery box mission.
SAFE – Contestant did not have to compete in that mission and was safe from elimination.
TASTE – Contestant had the dish which was tasted by judges in the mystery box mission.
HIGH – Contestant had the best dish for this mission.
IN – Contestant advanced to the next round.
ELIM – Contestant was eliminated.

- MM: Main Mission
- MB: Mystery Box
- TM: Team Mission
- FM: Final Mission

Contestant (Occupation)	Elimination Order														
Contestant (Occupation)	Episode 1		Episode 2		Episode 3		Episode 4		Episode 5		Episode 6		Episode 7		Episode 8
Contestant (Occupation)	MB	MM	MB	MM	MB	MM	MB	MM	MB	MM	TM	MM	MB	MM	FM
Son Ho-young (Singer)	IN	IN	IN	IN	TASTE	IN	TASTE	IN	IN	IN	IN	SAFE	WIN	IN	WINNER
Fei (Miss A singer)	WIN	SAFE	WIN	IN	IN	IN	WIN	SAFE	TASTE	IN	WIN	SAFE	TASTE	IN	RUNNER-UPS
Shin Bong-sun (Comedian)	IN	IN	IN	IN	IN	IN	IN	IN	WIN	SAFE	WIN	SAFE	TASTE	IN	RUNNER-UPS
Hwayobi (Singer)	IN	IN	TASTE	IN	IN	IN	WIN	SAFE	TASTE	HIGH	IN	IN	TASTE	ELIM	
Shin Eun-jung (Actress)	IN	IN	IN	IN	IN	IN	IN	IN	IN	IN	IN	ELIM			
Henry Lau (Super Junior-M singer)	TASTE	IN	TASTE	IN	WIN	SAFE	IN	IN	IN	ELIM					
Kim Sung-soo (Actor)	TASTE	IN	IN	IN	WIN	SAFE	TASTE	IN	IN	ELIM					
Tony An (Singer)	TASTE	IN	IN	IN	IN	IN	IN	ELIM							
Lee Kye-in (Actor)	IN	IN	IN	IN	IN	ELIM									
Jiyul (Dal Shabet singer)	IN	ELIM													
Seo Hye-jeong (Voice Actress)	IN	ELIM													

== List of episodes and detail of missions ==
=== Episode 1 (February 22) ===
Mystery Box: Nothing

For 60 minutes, make a most confident dish using all skills to show the passion in cooking. The winner could choose the main mission's theme ingredient first and could distribute its to other contestants.

Main Mission: Noodles

For 60 minutes, make a dish using the kind of noodles distributed by the mystery box's winner, who was safe from elimination and did not compete in this mission: Dang-myeon (Son Ho-young), Pasta (Lee Gye-in, Shin Eun-jung), Memil-myeon (Hwayobi, Henry), Ssal-guksu-myeon (Shin Bong-sun, Jiyul), So-myeon (Seo Hye-jeong, Kim Sung-soo), Kal-guksu-myeon (Tony An)

=== Episode 2 (March 1) ===
Mystery Box: Chef Kang Leo

For 60 minutes, make exactly anything that chef Kang Leo has made after observing his cooking process and tasting his dish. The winner could choose the main mission's theme ingredient first and could distribute its to other contestants.

Main Mission: Jang (장; Korean sauces and pastes)

For 60 minutes, make a dish using the kind of sauce or paste distributed by the mystery box's winner: Ganjang (Kim Sung-soo, Hwayobi, Fei), Gochujang (Lee Kye-in, Shin Bong-sun, Henry), Doenjang (Shin Eun-jung, Tony An, Son Ho-young)

=== Episode 3 (March 8) ===
Mystery Box: Manager

For 60 minutes, make dish using anything brought back (from ingredients to tools) by the managers, who have only five minutes (included in the cooking time) to choose the ingredients.

Main Mission: Gyeran-mari

For 10 minutes, make a gyeran-mari with ten eggs after observing the dish of Kim Seung-min, MasterChef Korea Season 1's winner. The mystery box's winner was safe from elimination and did not compete in this mission.

=== Episode 4 (March 15) ===
Mystery Box: Three-layer picnic box

For 60 minutes, make a meal suitable for spring picnic and arrange in three layers of box (one for rice, one for fruit and one for side dish).

Main Mission: Bibimbap

Taste chef Kim Sohyi's bibimbap and guess the ingredients in it (out of 21). Each contestant was called in to do the mission which would be stopped when they guess a wrong ingredient. Who have the least answers would be eliminated. The mystery box's winner was safe from elimination and did not compete in this mission.

Result (sort by mission execution order): Kim Sung-soo (9), Son Ho-young (10), Shin Eun-jung (10), Tony An (8), Shin Bong-sun (9), Henry (9)

=== Episode 5 (March 22) ===
Mystery Box: Dairy product

For 60 minutes, make a meal suitable for children using dairy products in the box. Two child chefs appeared as the special judges for this mission.

Main Mission: Waffle

For 60 minutes, make a special waffle dish. The mystery box's winner was safe from elimination and did not compete in this mission.

=== Episode 6 (March 29) ===
Team Mission: Jun Ji-hyun's mission

For 2 hours, make a three-meal menu for a party of 47 female guests. Five contestants divided into two teams whose the leader are the mystery box's winner and the best dish's contestant in previous episode. Guests would vote directly for their favorite dish by pressing the corresponding color button of the team.

- Red Team (win): Shin Bong-sun (leader), Fei
- Blue Team (lose): Hwayobi (leader), Shin Eun-jung, Son Ho-young

Main Mission: Fridge's leftover foods

For 60 minutes, make a dish using the leftover foods in fridge. Only two members of the losing team competed in this mission, team leader Hwayobi decided that she and Shin Eun-jung would compete, i.e. Son Ho-young was safe from elimination and did not compete in this mission.

=== Episode 7 (April 5) ===
Mystery Box: Healthy food

For 30 minutes, make a simple and healthy breakfast using the ingredients in the box. The winner could choose the main mission's theme ingredient first.

Main Mission:

For 60 minutes, make a dish using the theme ingredient chosen by another contestant. Except the mystery box's winner, after choosing the theme ingredient, all contestants had to invert the cooking place included their theme ingredient chosen.

- Before: Son Ho-young (Crab), Shin Bong-sun (Chicken), Hwayobi (Pork), Fei (Clam)
- After: Son Ho-young (Crab), Shin Bong-sun (Pork), Hwayobi (Clam), Fei (Chicken)

=== Episode 8 (April 12) ===
Final Mission:

For 2 hours, make a Korean three-course meal (Appetizer – Main course – Dessert).

Some guests appeared as supporters: former contestants such as Lee Kye-in, Seo Hye-jeong, Shin Eun-jung, Hwayobi, and other celebrities such as Park Jin-young, Kim Sook, Park Hwi-soon, Danny Ahn, Jia (Miss A), 15& and Baek A-yeon.
