= Dancing with the Stars (South Korean TV program) =

- Developed by: Park Jung-gun
- Presented by: Lee Deok-hwa; Kim Gyu-ri
- Judges: Park Sang-won; Alex Kim; Kim Joo-won
- Country of origin: South Korea
- No. of seasons: 3

Production
- Executive producer: Han Bong-gun
- Producer: Lim Yeon-sang
- Production companies: MBC C&I; Under license from BBC Worldwide

Original release
- Network: MBC TV
- Release: October 6, 2011 – June 7, 2013

Dancing with the Stars (Korean: 댄싱 위드 더 스타) is a dance competition show airing on MBC TV in South Korea. The show is based on the British reality TV competition Strictly Come Dancing and is part of the Dancing with the Stars franchise.

== Cast ==
=== Presenters ===
Key:

Current presenter
Previous presenter

Presenter	Season 1	Season 2	Season 3
Lee Deok-hwa			
Kim Gyu-ri			
Lee So-ra			

=== Judging panel ===
Key:

Current judging panel
Previous judge(s)

Judge	Season 1	Season 2	Season 3
Kim Joo-won			
Alex Kim			
Park Sang-won			
Song Seung-hwan			
Nam Kyong-joo			
Hwang Seon-woo			

== Contestants ==
=== Season 1 Contestants ===
- Kim Yeong-cheol (actor, partnered by Lee Chae-won)
- Kim Dong-kyoo (classical singer, partnered by Lee Han-na)
- Kim Jang-hoon (rock singer, partnered by Jeong Ah-reum)
- Lee Bong-Ju (former marathoner, partnered by Choi Soo-jeong)
- Moon Hee-joon (pop/rock singer, partnered by Ahn Hye-sang)
- Oh Sang-jin (announcer, partnered by Ham Ga-yeon)
- Kim Gyu-ri (actress, partnered by Kim Kang-san)
- Park Eun-ji (entertainer, partnered by Kwon Soon-yong)
- Jessica Gomes (model, partnered by Park Ji-woo)
- Lee Seul-ah (professional Go player, partnered by Park Sang-woon)
- Hyuna (pop singer, partnered by Nam Kee-yong)

=== Season 2 Contestants ===
- Kim Hyoyeon (pop singer, partnered by Kim Hyung-suk)
- Kim Ga-young (pocket billiards/pool player, partnered by Kim Kang-san)
- Ye Ji-won (actress, partnered by Bae Ji-ho)
- Choi Yeo-jin (actress and model, partnered by Park Ji-woo)
- Shin Soo-Ji (former rhythmic gymnast, partnered by Kwon Sun-bin)
- Choi Eun-kyung (entertainer, partnered by Kim Sang-min)
- Lee Hoon (actor, partnered by Ham Ga-yeon)
- Song Chong-gug (former football player, partnered by Lee Ji-eun)
- Denis Kang (MMA fighter, partnered by Kim Soo-kyung)
- Sunwoo Jae-duk (actor, partnered by Lee Han-na)
- Kim Won-chul (architect, partnered by Son Jin-joo)
- Tony An (singer, partnered by Bae So-young)

=== Season 3 Contestants ===
- Kim Wan-sun (singer, partnered by Kim Hyung-suk)
- Lee Jong-won (actor, partnered by Lee Chae-won)
- Lee Eun-gyeol (magician, partnered by Lee Jung-hyun)
- Kim Kyung-ho (rock singer, partnered by Ahn Hye-sang)
- Oh Mi-hee (actress, partnered by Kim Sang-min)
- Fei (pop singer, partnered by Kim Su-ro)
- Nam Bo-ra (actress, partnered by Kwon Sun-yong)
- Hye Park (model, partnered by Zegna)
- Woo Ji-Won (former basketball player, partnered by Choi Song-hwa)
- Seungho (pop singer, partnered by Son Jin-joo)
- Jeanette Lee (pool player, partnered by Lee Hoo-sun)
- Kim Dae-ho (announcer, partnered by Choi Soo-jeong)

== Series overview ==
Season	No. of stars	No. of weeks	Duration dates	Celebrity honor places		
Season	No. of stars	No. of weeks	Duration dates	Winner	Second place	Third place
1) 2011	11	12	June 10, 2011 – August 26, 2011	Moon Hee-joon & Ahn Hye-sang	Kim Gyu-ri & Kim Kang-san	Jessica Gomes & Park Ji-woo
2) 2012	12	12	April 27, 2012 – July 27, 2012	Choi Yeo-jin & Park Ji-woo	Kim Hyoyeon & Kim Hyung-suk	Ye Ji-won & Bae Ji-ho
3) 2013	12	12	March 8, 2013 – June 7, 2013	Fei & Kim Su-ro	Kim Kyung-ho & Ahn Hye-sang	Lee Eun-gyeol & Lee Jung-hyun
