= Days of Wrath =

Days of Wrath may refer to:

- Days of Wrath (2008 film), an American drama film
- Days of Wrath (2013 film), a South Korean film

== See also ==
- Day of Wrath, 1943 Danish film
