= Lee Tae-im =

South Korean actress (born 1986)

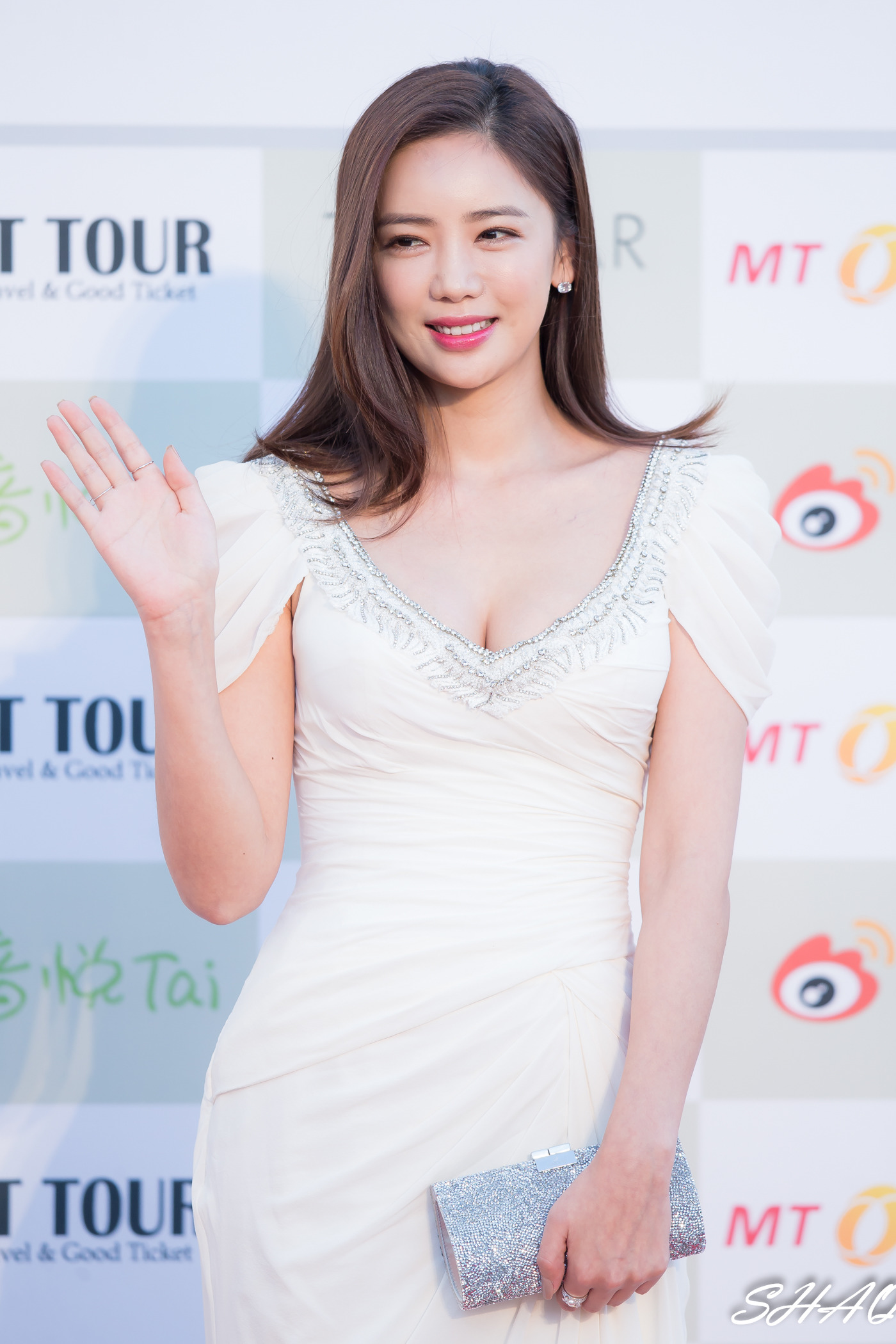
- Lee in February 2016
- Born: September 2, 1986 (age 40); Ulsan, South Korea
- Education: Hanyang University – Theater and Film
- Occupation: Actress
- Years active: 2007–2018
- Spouse: Unknown
- Children: 1

Korean name
- Hangul: 이태임
- RR: I Taeim
- MR: I T'aeim

Lee Tae-im (Korean: 이태임; born September 2, 1986) is a South Korean former actress. She graduated from Sunggwang Highschool and dropped out from Hanyang University, while majoring Theater and Film. She played the leading role in the series Don't Hesitate (2009), as well as supporting roles in the movies Days of Wrath (2013) and For the Emperor (2014).

== Controversies ==
In March 2015, while filming the Korean TV show My Tutor Friend Lee Tae-im and Kim Ye-won had a fight, with Lee reportedly swearing at Kim. After the incident, Lee claimed that Kim initiated the fight by using informal speech to address her, as informal speech is considered rude to be used while addressing older people and seniors in Korean culture. Despite her claims, Lee received public backlash, which caused her to withdraw from My Tutor Friend and other TV shows she was in. She publicly apologized to Kim and announced hiatus.

However, less than a month later, video footage of Lee and Kim quarrelling began circulating on the internet, proving Lee's claims that Kim used informal speech to address her. This caused the public sentiment to shift, with Kim's remarks from the footage becoming a subject of various parodies. After the backlash, Kim ultimately apologized to Lee.

== Filmography ==
=== Films ===
Year	Title	Role
2011	S.I.U	Jung Young-soon
2013	Days of Wrath	Ji-hee
2014	For the Emperor	Cha Yeon-soo

=== Television series ===
Year	Title	Role
2007	Two Outs in the Ninth Inning	(cameo)
2008	All About My Family	Yoo Tae-young
2009	Empress Cheonchu	Kim Mil-hwa
2009	Don't Hesitate	Jang Soo-hyun
2010	All About Marriage	Yoon Seo-young
2014	12 Years Promise	Joo Da-hae
2015	My Heart Twinkle Twinkle	Lee Soon-soo
2015	You Will Love Me	Park Ji-ho
2016	One More Time	Kang Ye-seul
2016	Entourage	Cha Young-bin's ex-girlfriend (Episode 1)
2017	The Lady in Dignity	Yoon Sung-hee

=== Variety shows ===
Year	Title	Notes/Ref.
2014–2015	Law of the Jungle in Costa Rica	Cast member (Episodes 137–145)
2015	SNL Korea – Season 6	Host (Episode 25)

== Awards and nominations ==
Year	Award	Category	Nominated work	Result
2009	SBS Drama Awards	New Star Award	Don't Hesitate	Won
2016	10th Korean Cable TV Awards	Best Couple (with Oh Chang-seok)	You Will Love Me	Won
2017	2017 Korea Drama Awards	Hot Star Award	The Lady in Dignity	Won
2017	2nd Asia Artist Awards	Choice Award	—N/a	Won
