= Don't Cry Mommy =

2012 film by Kim Yong-han

- Hangul: 돈 크라이 마미
- RR: Don keurai mami
- MR: Ton k'ŭrai mami
- Directed by: Kim Yong-han
- Written by: Lee Sang-hyeon; Yoon Seon-hee; Kim Yong-han
- Produced by: Kim Yoon-oh; Son Yoo-jin
- Starring: Yoo Sun; Nam Bo-ra; Yu Oh-seong
- Cinematography: Jeong Han-cheol
- Edited by: Kim Mi-joo
- Music by: Lee Jong-soo; Seo Dae-yeon
- Production companies: Cinema Golbangi Productions; Daisy Entertainment
- Distributed by: SBS Contents Hub
- Release dates: October 8, 2012 (BIFF); November 22, 2012 (South Korea)
- Running time: 92 minutes
- Country: South Korea
- Language: Korean
- Box office: $6,181,134

Don't Cry Mommy (Korean: 돈 크라이 마미) is a 2012 South Korean crime drama film directed by Kim Yong-han. The story was about a mother's revenge against her daughter's rapists. It premiered at the 2012 Busan International Film Festival before its theatrical release.

The film was inspired by Kim Bu-Nam case. Director Kim Yong-han said he wanted to raise awareness about sex crimes by charting "the tragic course of the lives of victims and their families as vividly as possible. Sexual abuse is like devastating a human's soul."

== Plot ==
Recently divorced, Yoo-lim (Yoo Sun) now lives with her only daughter, Eun-ah (Nam Bo-ra). Upon arriving at her new school, Eun-ah is frequently picked on, though she has feelings for classmate Jo-han (Shin Dongho). One day she is brutally raped by Jo-han and his friends. Yoo-lim tries to get justice for Eun-ah, but because the assailants are minors, they receive little punishment. In an effort to intimidate her, Eun-ah's rapists send video footage of the rape, threatening to post it if she does not comply. She tries to defend herself against them, but is unsuccessful; they gang rape her again.

Unable to cope with the trauma she was forced to endure, Eun-ah commits suicide. After discovering a birthday cake with Eun-ah's suicide note ("don't cry mommy") and video footage of both assaults sent to Eun-ah's phone, Yoo-lim is overwhelmed with grief and rage. She then sets out to make the boys' lives a living hell.

She was about to kill Jo-han first but when he lied that it was his friend's plan to rape Eun-ah, she went ahead to brutally murder the two Jo-han mentioned. When Yoo-lim realised that it was Jo-han whom was behind all of this, she entered his school and attempts to kill him, but police detective Oh, investigating Eun-ah's death rushes over to stop her. When confronted, Yoo-lim, having had enough of all she had to go through, makes an attempt to deliver the fatal blow, forcing detective Oh to shoot her with his gun, killing her. Jo-han succumbs to his wounds and dies shortly after.

The film ends with the credits referencing numerous underage sexual assault cases and calling for the criminal prosecution of sexual offenders regardless of age.

== Cast ==
- Yoo Sun as Yoo-lim
- Nam Bo-ra as Eun-ah, daughter of Yoo-lim
- Shin Dongho as Jo-han, schoolmate of Eun-ah
- Yu Oh-seong as Oh, police detective
- Kwon Hyun-sang as Park Joon
- Choi Dae-chul as Yoo-lim's ex-husband

== Awards and nominations ==
2013 Baeksang Arts Awards

- Nomination - Best New Actress - Nam Bo-ra

2013 Blue Dragon Film Awards

- Nomination - Best New Actress - Nam Bo-ra
