= My Tutor Friend (TV series) =

2014 South Korean TV series

- Country of origin: South Korea
- Original language: Korean
- No. of episodes: 21

Production
- Running time: 80 minutes

Original release
- Network: MBC
- Release: October 17, 2014 – April 2, 2015

My Tutor Friend (Korean: 띠동갑내기 과외하기 is a South Korean television series broadcast by MBC from October 2014 to April 2015. It is a program where the stars learn the chest choruses that they wanted to learn through private tutoring.

== Broadcast timeline ==
Period	Time (KST)	Type
September 8, 2014	Monday 8:40 – 10:00 PM	Pilot
September 12, 2014, October 17, 2014 – January 23, 2015	Friday 10:00 – 11:20 PM	Pilot / Regular
January 23, 2015 – April 2, 2015	Thursday 11:15 – 12:25	Regular

== Cast ==
- Choi Hwa-jung
- Kim Bumsoo
- Hong Jin-young
- Kim Dong-jun
- BamBam
- Jung Jae-hyung
- Lee Jae-hoon
- Song Ga-yeon
- Kim Sung-ryung
- Sung Si-kyung
- Jeong Jun-ha
- Kim Hee-chul
- Song Jae-ho
- Jin Ji-hee
- Lee Jae-yong
- Sam Hammington
- Yang Han-yeol
- Lee Tae-im

== Rating ==
In the ratings below, the highest rating for the show will be in red, and the lowest rating for the show will be in blue.

Episode #	Air Date	AGB Nielsen
2014
1	October 17, 2014	3.8%
2	October 31, 2014	3.4%
3	November 14, 2014	3.6%
4	November 21, 2014	3.2%
5	November 28, 2014	3.6%
6	December 5, 2014	3.1%
7	December 12, 2014	2.9%
Special	December 19, 2014	2.7%
8	December 26, 2014	3.8%
2015
9	January 2, 2015	3.2%
10	January 9, 2015	3.9%
11	January 16, 2015	4.3%
12	January 23, 2015	2.9%
13	January 29, 2015	2.2%
14	February 5, 2015	2.0%
15	February 12, 2015	2.2%
16	February 26, 2015	1.7%
17	March 5, 2015	1.7%
18	March 12, 2015	1.7%
19	March 19, 2015	2.0%
20	March 26, 2015	1.7%
21	April 2, 2015	1.9%

== Controversies ==
In March 2015, while filming the show, Lee Tae-im and Kim Ye-won had a fight, with Lee Tae-im reportedly swearing at Kim Ye-won. After the incident, Lee Tae-im claimed that Kim Ye-won initiated the fight by using informal speech to address her, as informal speech is considered rude to be used while addressing older people and seniors in Korean culture. Despite her claims, Lee Tae-im received public backlash, which caused her to withdraw from My Tutor Friend and other TV shows she was in. She publicly apologized to Kim Ye-won and announced hiatus.

However, less than a month later, video footage of Lee Tae-im and Ye-won quarrelling began circulating on the Internet, proving Lee Tae-im's claims that Kim Ye-won used informal speech to address her. This caused the public sentiment to shift, with Kim Ye-won's remarks from the footage becoming a subject of various parodies. After the backlash, Kim Ye-won ultimately apologized to Lee Tae-im.

== Awards and nominations ==
Year	Award	Category	Recipients	Result
2014	MBC Entertainment Awards	Popularity Award in a Variety Show	Kim Sung-ryung	Won
