= Kim Young-jae (actor, born 1975) =

South Korean actor

- Born: October 5, 1975 (age 50); Gwangyang, South Jeolla, South Korea
- Education: Chung-Ang University – Journalism
- Occupation: Actor
- Years active: 2001–present
- Agent: Humane Entertainment
- Spouse: Yang Yoon-seon (m. 2010)

Korean name
- Hangul: 김영재
- RR: Gim Yeongjae
- MR: Kim Yŏngjae

Kim Young-jae (Korean: 김영재; born October 5, 1975) is a South Korean actor. Kim began his acting career appearing in short films and bit parts, and while he later became best known as a supporting actor in mainstream film and television, he has also played leading roles in indies such as One Step More to the Sea (2009), Link (2011) and Suddenly Last Summer (2012), as well as the TV dramas Love Is Over (2006), Don't Hesitate (2009) and Three Sisters (2010).

== Filmography ==
=== Film ===
Year	Title	Role	Notes/Ref.
2001	Declare	Husband	short film
2002	Tell Me If You Have Memories		short film
2002	Story of the Sea		short film
2002	My Beautiful Days	Waiter	
2002	I Can Fly to You But You...	Min-soo	
2002	Resurrection of the Little Match Girl		
2002	The Coast Guard	Medic	
2003	Alone Together	Young-jae	short film from Twentidentity
2003	Caffè Latte Tall Size		short film
2003	A Runner's High		short film from Twentidentity
2003	Say That You Want to Fuck with Me		short film
2003	Irreversible	Jung-nam	short film
2003	Scent of Love	Geul-bboo-ri member	
2003	Wild Card	Fake Noh Jae-bong	
2003	Singles	Sun-ho	
2004	My New Boyfriend	Young-jae (cameo)	short film
2004	Paper Airplane	Pilot	short film
2004	Au Revoir, UFO	Jung-hoon	
2004	Spider Forest	Doctor 1	
2005	Waiting for Young-jae	Young-jae	short film from Lovers
2005	Blossom Again	Oh Jung-woo	
2007	Rainy Days		
2007	Secret Sunshine	Lee Min-ki	
2008	Modern Boy	Okai	
2008	Sleeping Beauty	Undertaker	segment: "My Cousin"
2009	One Step More to the Sea	Sun-jae	
2010	Vegetarian	Kil-soo	
2011	Link	Gu Seong-woo	
2011	Punch	Min-gu	
2011	S.I.U.	Jo Soo-han	
2012	Suddenly Last Summer	Kyung-hoon	
2013	Boomerang Family	Jung Geun-bae	
2014	Another Promise	Department head Lee	
2014	Thread of Lies	Man-ji and Cheon-ji's dad	
2014	Godsend	Painter	
2014	The Target	Prosecutor (cameo)	
2014	Whistle Blower	Press conference moderator (cameo)	
2020	Mr. Zoo: The Missing VIP	Hwang Bo-sung	
2020	Beyond That Mountain	Kim Dae-geon	

=== Television series ===
Year	Title	Role	Notes/Ref.
2005	A Love to Kill	Kang Min-gu	
2006	Love Is Over	Bae Shin-wook	
2007	Lucifer	Na Seok-jin	
2008	My Sweet Seoul	Nam Yoo-joon	
2008	Hometown Legends "Ghost Letter"	King Injong	
2008	Don't Cry My Love	Jo Tae-sub	
2009	Don't Hesitate	Choi Min-young	
2010	Three Sisters	Choi Young-ho	
2011	Special Task Force MSS	Jo Yong-seok	
2012	KBS Drama Special "Amore Mio"	Seo Min-woo	
2012	KBS Drama Special "Just an Ordinary Love Story"	Carpenter Kang	
2012	My Kids Give Me a Headache	Kim Chang-ho	
2013	You Are the Best!	Han Jae-hyung	
2013	Monstar	PD Byun Hee-sool	Cameo, (Episode 8)
2013	The King's Daughter, Soo Baek-hyang	Soo Ni-moon	
2013	KBS Drama Special "The Devil Rider"	Kim Ik	
2013	Bel Ami	Park Moon-soo	
2014	Cheo Yong	Doctor	Cameo, (Episode 1)
2014	My Dear Cat	Shin Se-ki	
2014	Reset	Psychiatrist	Cameo
2016	The Vampire Detective	Kim Kyung-soo	Cameo, (Episode 2)
2018	Mother	Eun-cheol	
2018	Children of Nobody	Kim Min-suk	
2019	The Wind Blows	Moon Kyung-hoon	
2020	Stranger	Kim Sa-hyun	
2021	Mouse	Go Moo-won	
2021	High Class	Lee Jeong-woo	
2021	Artificial City	Jung Joon-il	
2022	Becoming Witch	Nam Moo-young	
2022	Under the Queen's Umbrella	Min Seung-yoon	
2022	Reborn Rich	Jin Yoon-gi	
2023	Numbers	Kang Hyun	
2023	My Demon	Do-hee's father	Cameo
2023	Maestra: Strings of Truth	Kim Pil	
