= S.I.U. (film) =

- Film poster
- Directed by: Hwang Byeng-gug
- Written by: Kim Yu-jin; Hwang Seong-gu
- Produced by: Shin Beom-soo; Kim Won-guk
- Starring: Uhm Tae-woong; Joo Won
- Cinematography: Kang Seung-gi
- Edited by: Moon In-dae
- Music by: Kim Tae-seong; Noh Hyeong-woo
- Distributed by: Lotte Entertainment
- Release date: November 24, 2011
- Running time: 111 minutes
- Country: South Korea
- Language: Korean
- Box office: US$7.8 million

S.I.U. (Special Investigations Unit) (Korean: 특수본; RR: Teuksubon) is a 2011 South Korean action crime film directed by Hwang Byeong-gug, starring Uhm Tae-woong and Joo Won.

Joo Won received nominations for Best New Actor at the 48th Baeksang Arts Awards and the 21st Buil Film Awards in 2012.

== Plot ==
Seong-beom is a foul-mouthed, hot-tempered detective with uncanny animal instincts in the violent crimes section who has never failed to solve a case. While he is on an undercover operation, he hears that a colleague of his has been brutally murdered by an unknown assailant. Seong-beom and the police agency instinctively know there is something behind this murder case. They set up a Special Investigations Unit (S.I.U.), and profiler Ho-ryong, a former FBI agent, is assigned as Seong-beom's partner. As the police dragnet begins to close in, the suspect is always faster than the police. They then receive a suspicious shoot to kill order from high-ranking police officials once the suspect is found. The team must fight against conspiring powers responsible for the crime, all the while dealing with tension and mistrust that begin to build within the police force itself as more information about the case begins to surface that may implicate corrupt detectives within their ranks.

== Cast ==
- Uhm Tae-woong as Kim Seong-beom
- Joo Won as Kim Ho-ryong
- Jung Jin-young as Police chief Hwang Doo-soo
- Sung Dong-il as Park In-moo
- Lee Tae-im as Jung Young-soon
- Kim Jung-tae as Park Kyeong-sik
- Kim Young-jae as Jo Soo-han
- Lee Hee-joon as Geun-soo
- Jung Man-sik as Joon-seok
- Jo Jae-yoon as Informant
- Park Min-jung as In-moo's younger sister
- Jeon Sang-jin as Team leader Jang
- Yoo Seung-mok as Il-do
- Kim Min-jae as Lee Jae-wi
- Ban Min-jeong as Go Soo-jin
- Yeom Dong-heon as Provincial representative
- Im Chae-seon as Ttal Ra-i
- Kim Tae-hee as Big Ong-bak
- Oh Hee-joon as Messenger
- Uhm Tae-goo as Skinny Ong-bak
