= Don't Hesitate =

- Promotional poster
- Genre: Drama; Romance; Family
- Written by: Kang Yoon-kyung; Oh Young-sook
- Directed by: Han Jung-hwan
- Starring: Lee Tae-im; Lee Sang-woo; Kim Young-jae; Bae Min-hee
- Country of origin: South Korea
- Original language: Korean
- No. of episodes: 98

Production
- Production location: Korea
- Running time: Mondays to Fridays at 08:40 (KST)

Original release
- Network: Seoul Broadcasting System
- Release: October 5, 2009 – February 26, 2010

Don't Hesitate (Korean: 망설이지마; RR: Mangseorijima) is a South Korean television series starring Lee Tae-im, Lee Sang-woo, Kim Young-jae, and Bae Min-hee. The morning soap opera aired on SBS on Mondays to Fridays at 8:40 a.m. from October 5, 2009 to February 26, 2010 for 98 episodes.

== Plot ==
Jang Soo-hyun was a woman who'd previously devoted her life to love, even donating her liver to save her first love, but was rewarded by betrayal. Since then, she has become jaded and resolved to distance herself from relationships. Until she meets Han Tae-woo, a man who has never known or believed in love. Tae-woo had built a wall around his heart in fear of being hurt again, but Soo-hyun becomes someone whom he learns to sacrifice everything for.

== Cast ==
Jang family

- Lee Tae-im as Jang Soo-hyun
- Kim Hye-ok as Cha Young-ran
- Kim Hee-joon as Jang Soo-ho
- Kim Hyung-bum as Cha Dal-soo

Han family

- Lee Sang-woo as Han Tae-woo
  - Kang Soo-han as young Tae-woo
- Park Young-ji as Han Jin-kyu
- Choi Ran as Uhm Mi-soon

Choi family

- Kim Young-jae as Choi Min-young
- Bae Min-hee as Oh Sun-ah
- Lee Hye-sook as Lee Jung-soo
- Yoon Yi-na as Choi Min-ae

Extended cast

- Lee Jung-gil as President Song Choong-hee
- Won Sook-hee as Baek Sung-mi
- Lee Seung-hyung as Choi Man-soo
- Moon Ji-in as Kim Ga-roo
- Hong Yeo-jin as Hong Na-ryung (Sun-ah's mother)
- Baek Seung-hyeon as Kim Byung-soo
- Jang Joon-ho as PD Han
- Jo Hee as blind date man
- Seo Ji-yeon as Secretary Kim
- Park Ha-young
- Kim Gyu-jin
- Eun Joo-hee

== Awards and nominations ==
Year	Award	Category	Recipient	Result
2009	17th SBS Drama Awards	Best Supporting Actress in a Serial Drama	Kim Hye-ok	Nominated
2009	17th SBS Drama Awards	New Star Award	Lee Tae-im	Won
