= Days of Wrath (2013 film) =

- Film poster
- Directed by: Shin Jai-ho
- Written by: Shin Jai-ho; Yoon Joon-hee
- Produced by: Oh Pil-jin; Cho Yoon-jung
- Starring: Yang Dong-geun; Joo Sang-wook
- Cinematography: Kim Hong-gi
- Edited by: Kyung Min-ho
- Distributed by: 9ers Entertainment
- Release date: October 31, 2013
- Running time: 103 minutes
- Country: South Korea
- Language: Korean
- Box office: US$1,018,646

Days of Wrath (Korean: 응징자; RR: Eungjingja; lit. 'The Punisher') is a 2013 South Korean action film about a man who, having been bullied as a teenager, seeks revenge against the former classmate who ruined his life.

== Plot ==
Chang-sik bullied Joon-seok relentlessly during high school. And his girlfriend was raped by Chang-sik in front of him and committed suicide on the next day. Fifteen years later, the two encounter each other again. Chang-sik is working for a conglomerate, and preparing for his wedding. On the other hand, because of his traumatic experience, Joon-seok has a difficult time getting a decent job even though he graduated from a prestigious university; he works part-time as a valet park attendant and frequents a convenience store nearby. Unable to forget, Joon-seok prepares for revenge to make Chang-sik pay.

== Cast ==
- Yang Dong-geun as Kang Chang-sik
- Joo Sang-wook as Joon-suk
- Lee Tae-im as Ji-hee
- Jang Tae-sung as Doo-joon
- Ban Min-jung as Mi-ok
- Na Hyun-joo as Hyun-joo
- Kim Kwon as Joon-suk (young)
- Kang Dae-hyun as Kang Chang-sik (young)
- Seo Joon-yeol as Doo-joon (young)
- Kang Bok-eum as So-eun
- Choi Hong-il as Uncle
- Han Chul-woo as Department head
- Son Kang-gook - Home room teacher
- Kim Ji-eun as Sun-mi
- Jeon Gook-hwan as Chang-sik's father (cameo)
- Seo Dong-soo as History teacher (cameo)

== Film Festival ==
In July 2014, the film was selected to be shown in the 2014 Fantasia International Film Festival in Montreal, Canada.
