= MasterChef Korea =

2012–2016 South Korean TV series

- Promotional poster of S4
- Genre: Cooking
- Judges: Kim Sohyi (1,2,4); Kang Leo (1,2,3); Noh Hee-young (1,2,3); Kim Hooni (3,4); Song Hoon (4)
- Country of origin: South Korea
- Original language: Korean
- No. of seasons: 4

Production
- Executive producer: Seok Jeong-ho
- Producer: Kim Kyung Su
- Running time: 75 minutes

Original release
- Network: O'live
- Release: 27 April 2012 – 19 May 2016

MasterChef Korea (Korean: 마스터셰프 코리아) is a South Korean competitive reality television cooking show based on the British television cooking game show MasterChef. The first season premiered on O'live Network on 27 April 2012. It ran for four seasons and ended on 19 May 2016.

The winner of MasterChef Korea received 300 million won, shopping credits, a refrigerator and their own cookbook.

== Season summary ==
Male contestants
Female contestants

=== Season 1: 27 April – 20 July 2012 ===
- Winner: Kim Seung-min (김승민)

In the preliminary stages, participants had to prepare a dish and present it to the judges (i.e. Kim Sohyi, Kang Leo and Noh Hee-young), who would decide if they would advance to the next stage and receive their white aprons. 39 people qualified and were then immediately put through a skills test in cutting onions and an invention test with the ingredient tofu. The remaining top 15 contestants were then put through a series of tests to determine the winner of MasterChef Korea.

==== Contestants ====
Contestant	Age	Occupation	Hometown	Status	Place
Nom Seong-seok (놈성석)	45	Businessman	Seoul	1st eliminated	20th
Lim Ji-sung (임지성)	21	Law student	Gwangju	2nd eliminated	-
Park Ji-hyun (박지현)	26	Actress	Seoul	3rd eliminated	19th
Kim Woo-seok (김우석)	35	Football teacher	Busan	4th eliminated	18th
Ho Hye-neon (호혜언)	65	Retired	Jeju	5th eliminated	17th
Park Yu-tong (박유통)	36	Dentist	Ulsan	6th eliminated	16th
Kim Da-nang (김다낭)	31	Fashion designer	Busan	7th eliminated	15th
Yeong Ho-baek (영호백)	31	Bus driver	Gwangmyeong	8th eliminated	-
Si Mang-ha (서만하)	41	English teacher	Incheon	9th eliminated	14th
Lee Na-sang (이나상)	19	Gastronomy student	Seoul	10th eliminated	13th
Choi Wang-seok (최왕석)	53	Lawyer and businessman	Daegu	11th eliminated	12th
Dong Ji-min (동지민)	22	Medicine student	Seoul	12th eliminated	11th
Lim Ji-sung (임지성)	21	Law student	Gwangju	13th eliminated	10th
Yeong Ho-baek (영호백)	34	Bus driver	Gwangmyeong	14th eliminated	9th
Lim Seo-min (임서민)	29	Stylist and tattoo artist	Incheon	15th eliminated	8th
Kim Tae-song (김태성)	44	Science teacher	Busan	16th eliminated	7th
Ho Seung-kyu (호승규)	32	Artist and actress	Seoul	17th eliminated	6th
Park Ha-joo (박하주)	36	Model	Ansan	18th eliminated	5th
Lim Seok-seung (임석승)	43	Math teacher	Incheon	3rd finalist	4th
Kim Bo-jung (김보정)	36	Tattoo artist	Seoul	2nd finalist	3rd
Lee Da-eun (이다은)	41	Merchant	Ulsan	Runner-up	2nd
Kim Seung-min (김승민)	38	Systems engineer	Incheon	Winner	1st

=== Season 2 ===
- Season 2: 10 May – 2 August 2013
  - Winner: Choi Kang-rok (최강록)

==== Contestants ====
Contestant	Age	Occupation	Hometown	Status	Place
Kim Yu-ju (김유주)	32	Food seller	Ansan	1st eliminated	16th
Lee Hee-won (이희원)	36	English teacher	Seoul	2nd eliminated	-
Hong Hyuk-jin (홍혁진)	59	Retired	Gimpo	3rd eliminated	15th
Kim Seon-min (김선민)	32	Basketball player	Suwon	4th eliminated	14th
Lee Tae-reum (이태름)	55	Merchant	Busan	5th eliminated	13th
Kim Mi-eun (김미은)	41	School principal	Seoul	6th eliminated	12th
Yoon Hwang-seo (윤황서)	19	Medicine student	Daegu	7th eliminated	-
Cho Ye-rim (조예림)	28	Baker	Ulsan	8th eliminated	11th
Kim Seo-hyung (김서형)	32	Dancer	Jeju	9th eliminated	10th
Oh Ye-na (오예나)	33	Spanish teacher	Busan	10th eliminated	9th
Bae Hyung-gul (배형걸)	47	Biochemical	Guri	11th eliminated	8th
Yui Asai (아사이 유이)	28	Nurse	Japan	12th eliminated	7th
Yu Xiao-qi (유샤오치)	52	Fruit seller	China	13th eliminated	6th
Lee Hee-won (이희원)	36	English teacher	Seoul	14th eliminated	5th
Miku Nakamura (나카무라 미쿠)	21	Trainee	Japan	3rd finalist	4th
Hwang Eun-hyun (황은현)	28	Actor and dancer	Seongnam	2nd finalist	3rd
Yoon Hwang-seo (윤황서)	19	Medicine student	Daegu	Runner-up	2nd
Choi Kang-rok (최강록)	42	Fisherman	Incheon	Winner	1st

- Season 3: 10 May – 2 August 2014
  - Winner: Choi Kwang Ho (최광호)
- Season 4: 3 March – 19 May 2016
  - Winner: Kim Jung Hyun (김정현)
