= Hwayobi =

South Korean singer

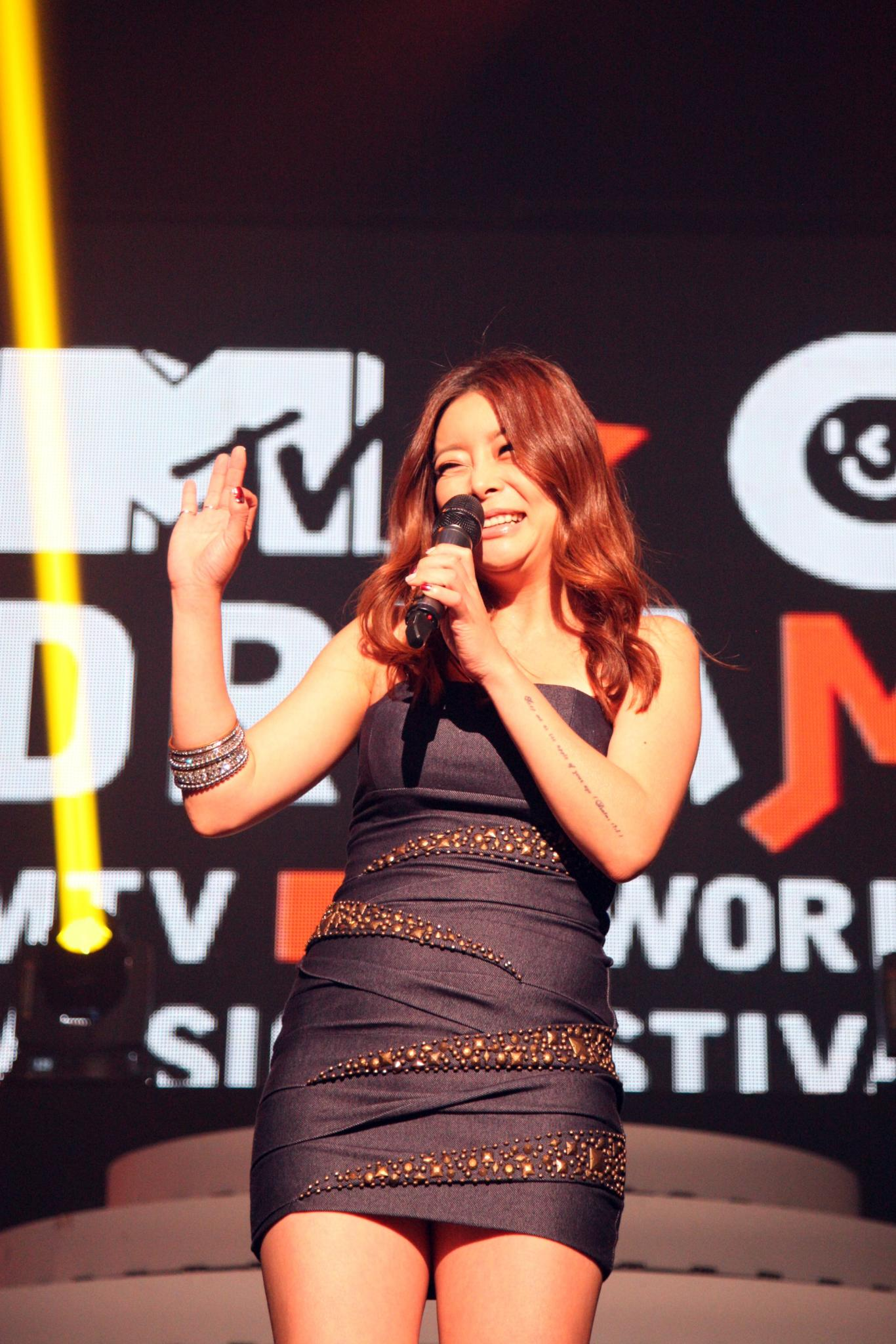
- Hwayobi at the Cyworld Dream Music Festival on July 23, 2011

Background information
- Born: Park Mi-yeong; February 11, 1982 (age 44); Gunsan, North Jeolla Province, South Korea
- Genres: K-pop; R&B
- Years active: 2000–present
- Label: Studio Curiosity

- Hwayobi
- Hangul: 박레아
- Hanja: 朴레아
- RR: Bak Rea
- MR: Pak Rea

Stage name
- Hangul: 박화요비
- Hanja: 朴火曜飛
- RR: Bak Hwayobi
- MR: Pak Hwayobi

Former name
- Hangul: 박미영
- Hanja: 朴美英
- RR: Bak Miyeong
- MR: Pak Miyŏng

Park Hwayobi (February 11, 1982), more commonly known as Hwayobi, is a South Korean R&B singer-songwriter.

== Profile ==
Hwayobi is regarded South Korea's "Queen of R&B". Hwayobi won awards for Best Female R&B artist and Best Female Ballad Singer from the Korean Entertainment Art Awards in 2005 and 2006. Her appearance on the variety show We Got Married in 2008 increased her popularity among the Korean public. She also appeared on Immortal Songs: Singing the Legend.

== Discography ==
=== Studio albums ===
Title	Album details	Peak chart positions		Sales
Title	Album details	KOR RIAK	KOR Gaon (Note: The Gaon Music Chart was established in 2010.)	Sales
My All	Released: June 14, 2000 (KOR); Label: Shincon Music; Format: CD, cassette	29	—	KOR: 239,950
Nineteen Plus One	Released: September 17, 2001 (KOR); Label: Shincon Music; Format: CD, cassette	12	—	KOR: 117,987
Because I Love You	Released: October 12, 2002 (KOR); Label: Shincon Music; Format: CD, cassette	7	—	KOR: 120,296
Soul Saver	Released: July 8, 2004 (KOR); Label: Shincon Music; Format: CD, cassette	7	—	KOR: 40,391
5˚	Released: February 9, 2006 (KOR); Label: Shincon Music; Format: CD, cassette	12	—	KOR: 15,440
火曜飛	Released: March 29, 2006 (JPN); Label: SME Records; Format: CD	—	—	
Sunshine	Released: March 13, 2008 (KOR); Label: Universal; Format: CD	15	—	KOR: 5,573
Hwayobi	Released: May 27, 2010 (KOR); Label: Gloworks Communications; Format: CD, digital download	—N/a	82	
8	Released: September 29, 2016 (KOR); Label: Studio Curiosity; Format: CD, digital download	—N/a	41	
"—" denotes a recording that did not chart or was not released in that territory.

=== Extended plays ===
Title	Album details	Peak chart positions	Sales
Title	Album details	KOR Gaon	Sales
This Is Love	Released: February 5, 2009 (KOR); Label: Gloworks Communications; Format: CD, digital download	42	
Summer	Released: August 6, 2009 (KOR); Label: Gloworks Communications; Format: CD, digital download	—	
Girl Like Me (나 같은 여자)	Released: October 14, 2010 (KOR); Label: Gloworks Communications; Format: CD, digital download	13	
Reborn	Released: June 30, 2011 (KOR); Label: Lion Media; Format: CD, digital download	—	
I Am	Released: November 23, 2012 (KOR); Label: Lion Media; Format: CD, digital download	—	
820211	Released: January 15, 2015 (KOR); Label: Studio Curiosity; Format: CD, digital download	18	
"—" denotes a recording that did not chart or was not released in that territory.

=== Singles ===
Title	Year	Peak chart positions	Album
Title	Year	KOR	Album
"Lie"	2000	—	My All
"Something Like That" (그런일은)	2000	—	My All
"Tears" (눈물)	2001	—	Nineteen Plus One
"I..." (난...)	2001	—	Nineteen Plus One
"How Are You?" (어떤가요)	2002	—	Because I Love You
"When The End Is In Sight..." (끝이 보일때쯤..)	2002	—	Because I Love You
"Counting Our Kisses" (당신과의 키스를 세어보아요)	2004	—	Soul Saver
"Whenever" (언제라도)	2004	—	Soul Saver
"Fly Again"	2004	—	火曜飛
"天国の記憶"	2005	—	火曜飛
"Maemmaemdora" (맴맴돌아)	2006	—	5˚
"Butterflies Flying in the Desert" (사막을 나는 나비)	2006	—	5˚
"Men Don't Know" (남자는 모른다)	2008	—	Sunshine
"Half" (반쪽)	2009	—	This Is Love
"Once"	2009	—	Non-album single
"Kiss Kiss Kiss" (feat. Sleepy)	2009	—	Summer
"Ghost" (with Koh Yoo-jin)	2009	37	Non-album single
"Bye Bye Bye"	2010	6	Hwayobi
"Girl Like Me" (나 같은 여자)	2010	8	Girl Like Me
"Stay Together" (같이 있어줘) (with Tae Ha)	2011	35	Non-album single
"2 The Sky"	2011	39	Reborn
"I'm OK"	2011	49	Reborn
"I Live Like This" (난 이렇게 살아)	2012	16	I Am
"I'm Dangerous" (나는 위험해)	2012	30	I Am
"Closer" (가까이서보니 미인이네) (feat. Wutan)	2014	57	Non-album single
"Standing For Love" (마주보기)	2014	55	820211
"My Man" (그사람)	2015	30	820211
"Do You Love Somebody...?" (연애는 하니..?)	2015	67	8
"Don't Answer" (내 전화 받지 마)	2015	—	8
"Oh...Summer" (오..여름)	2016	—	8
"Come Back To You" (제가 돌아왔어요)	2016	—	8
"Never Say Goodbye" (이별 안 해)	2017	—	Non-album singles
"R-rated" (만 19세)	2017	—	Non-album singles
"Like The Wind" (바람 같은 그대를)	2021	—	Non-album singles
"Sunset" (놀)	2021	—	Non-album singles
"—" denotes a recording that did not chart or was not released in that territory.

=== Soundtrack appearances ===
- 2004.10.12: 두번째 프러포즈 OST (Second Propose) : Track 03 - 잊혀진 계절
- 2005.05.25: 패션 70's OST (Fashion 70's) : Track 08 - 그림자
- 2008.12.24: 스타의 연인 OST (Star's Lover) : Track 02 - 내겐 어려운 그 말
- 2009.10.29: 수상한 삼형제 OST (Three Brothers) : Track 05 - 마취 (Anesthesia)
- 2009.11.09: 내 눈에 콩깍지 OST (The Relation Of Face, Mind And Love) : Track 05 - 사랑탓 (Love Fault)
- 2010.02.16: OB/GYN Doctors OST : Track 02 - 늦은 사랑 (Late Love)
- 2011.05.28 Miss Ripley OST Part.1 (미스리플리)유리 (Glass)
- 2012.02.20 Korean Peninsula OST Part.2 (한반도)만약에 우리 둘 중 하나라도 (If We Were)
- 2012.02.20 Korean Peninsula OST Part.2 (한반도)Cheonguk (천국)
- 2012.12.10 My Love, Madame Butterfly OST Part.2 (내 사랑 나비부인)

== Filmography ==
=== Variety shows ===
- We Got Married (Season 1: Episodes 25, 29-44) - with Hwanhee
- MasterChef Korea Celebrity

== Awards ==
- Seoul Music Awards Rookie of the Year (2000)
- The 12th Republic of Korea Entertainment Art Award category R&B Singer Women (2005)
- The 13th Korea Entertainment Art Awards "Best Ballad Artist (Female)" (2006)
- MBC Broadcast Entertainment Awards Best Brand Award Prize (2008)
