= Nam Bo-ra =

South Korean actress (born 1989)

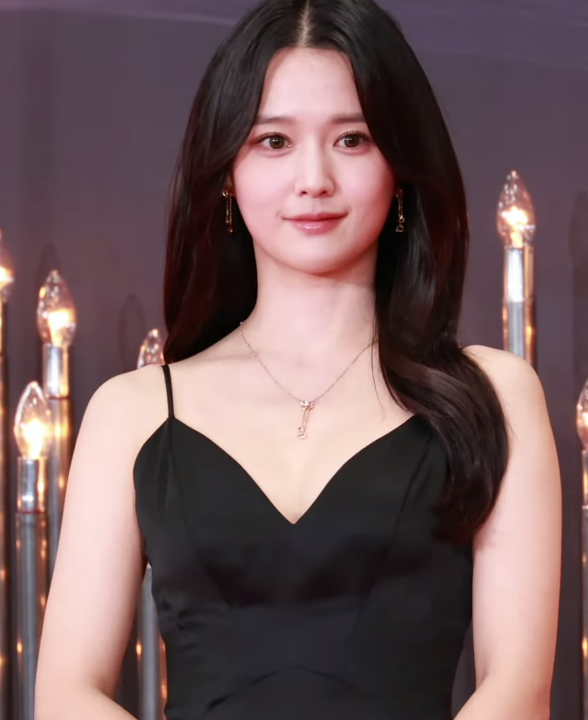
- Nam in December 2023
- Born: November 27, 1989 (age 36); Seoul, South Korea
- Education: Dongduk Women's University - Broadcasting
- Occupation: Actress
- Years active: 2006–present
- Agent: Jellyfish Entertainment
- Spouse: Lee Chan-woo (m. 2025)
- Children: 1
- Relatives: No Min-woo (nephew)

Korean name
- Hangul: 남보라
- RR: Nam Bora
- MR: Nam Pora

Nam Bo-ra (Korean: 남보라; born November 27, 1989) is a South Korean actress. She appeared in Sunny, Moon Embracing the Sun, and Don't Cry, Mommy.

== Personal life ==
Nam grew up in a large family, with one elder brother and twelve younger siblings (7 brothers, 5 sisters), though one of her younger brothers had died. One of her nephews is No Min-woo, a member of the 6-member K-pop boy group Boyfriend.

On October 20, 2024, Nam announced her engagement to her non-celebrity boyfriend on her YouTube channel. Nam married businessman Lee Chan-woo on May 10, 2025. On December 11, 2025, Nam announced that she was expecting the couples first child. Nam gave birth to her first child, a son, on June 15, 2026.

== Filmography ==
=== Film ===
Year	Title	Role	Notes/Ref.
2010	Death Bell 2	Hyun-ah	
2010	I Saw the Devil	Section Chief Oh's daughter	
2011	Sunny	young Seo Geum-ok	
2012	Howling	Jung-ah	
2012	Horror Stories	Bak-ji	segment: "Secret Recipe"
2012	Don't Cry, Mommy	Eun-ah	
2013	The Suspect	Ji Dong-chul's wife	
2015	Moon Young	Yeong-eun	
2019	A Diamond In The Rough	Kim Gi-soon	
2021	Croissant	Seong-eun	
2021	New Year Blues	Hyo Young's neighbor	Cameo
2021	A Long Day		
2023	My Brilliant Revenge	Uhm So-hyun	

=== Television series ===
Year	Title	Role
2006	Look Back With a Smile	Nam Bo-ra
2010	Road No. 1	Kim Soo-hee
2010	KBS Drama Special: "Last Flashman"	Jo Ah-ra
2010	Once Upon a Time in Saengchori	Oh Na-young
2011	Glory Jane	Kim Jin-joo
2012	Moon Embracing the Sun	Princess Minhwa
2013	Don't Look Back: The Legend of Orpheus	Han Yi-hyun
2013	KBS Drama Special: "The Memory in My Old Wallet"	Chae Soo-ah
2013	A Little Love Never Hurts	Song Eun-joo
2014	Only Love	Kim Saet-byul
2015	My Heart Twinkle Twinkle	Lee Soon-jung
2015	KBS Drama Special: "Love Detective Sherlock K"	Kang Da-hae/Sherlock-K
2016	Spark	Son Ha-neul
2017	Lovers in Bloom	Jin Bo-ra
2018	Top Star U-back	Noh Hae-won
2021	The Penthouse: War in Life 2	pianist for Bae Ro-na (Cameo)
2022	It's Beautiful Now	Kim Yu-jin
2022	Today's Webtoon	Jang Hye-mi
2023–2024	Live Your Own Life	Jeong Mi-rim

=== Variety show ===
Year	Title
2005	Chorus of Angels (Sunday Sunday Night)
2008	날아라 슛돌이 4기
2013	Dancing with the Stars: Season 3
2018	Secret Sisters
2019–2022	Class of Difference

=== Music video appearances ===
Year	Song title	Artist
2003	"Ache Aching"	Sol Flower
2012	"Leaving"	Noel
2013	"Hello"	NU'EST
2014	"The Space Between"	SoYou, Kwon Soonil, Park Yongin (Urban Zakapa)

== Discography ==
Album information	Track listing
Project 나쁜사랑 (Project Bad Love): Single; Released: November 24, 2009; Label: Starsharp Entertainment	Track listing: 1. Intro; 2. 나쁜 사랑 (Bad Love)

== Ambassadorship ==
- Public Relations Ambassador of Yellow Umbrella (2023)

== Awards and nominations ==
Year	Award	Category	Nominated work	Result
2011	19th Korean Culture and Entertainment Awards	Best New Actress in a Drama	Once Upon a Time in Saengchori, Glory Jane	Won
2012	MBC Drama Awards	Best New Actress	Moon Embracing the Sun	Nominated
2013	49th Baeksang Arts Awards	Best New Actress	Don't Cry Mommy	Nominated
2013	34th Blue Dragon Film Awards	Best New Actress	Don't Cry Mommy	Nominated
2013	KBS Drama Awards	Best New Actress	Shark, The Memory in My Old Wallet	Nominated
2014	3rd APAN Star Awards	Best New Actress	Only Love	Won
2014	SBS Drama Awards	New Star Award	Only Love	Won
