= Kim Sohyi =

South Korean celebrity chef (born 1965)

- Born: 14 February 1965 (age 61)
- Culinary career
- Current restaurant
- Kim Kocht
- Television shows
- Judge on MasterChef Korea (Seasons 1, 2 & 4)
- Website: http://www.sohyikim.com/

Kim Sohyi (Korean: 김소희) is a South Korean chef and television personality.

== Career ==
Kim is the owner and chef of Kim Kocht in Vienna, Austria, a fusion Korean restaurant that has been running since 2001. Kim was also a former judge of the cooking show MasterChef Korea.
