= Fei (singer) =

Chinese singer and actress

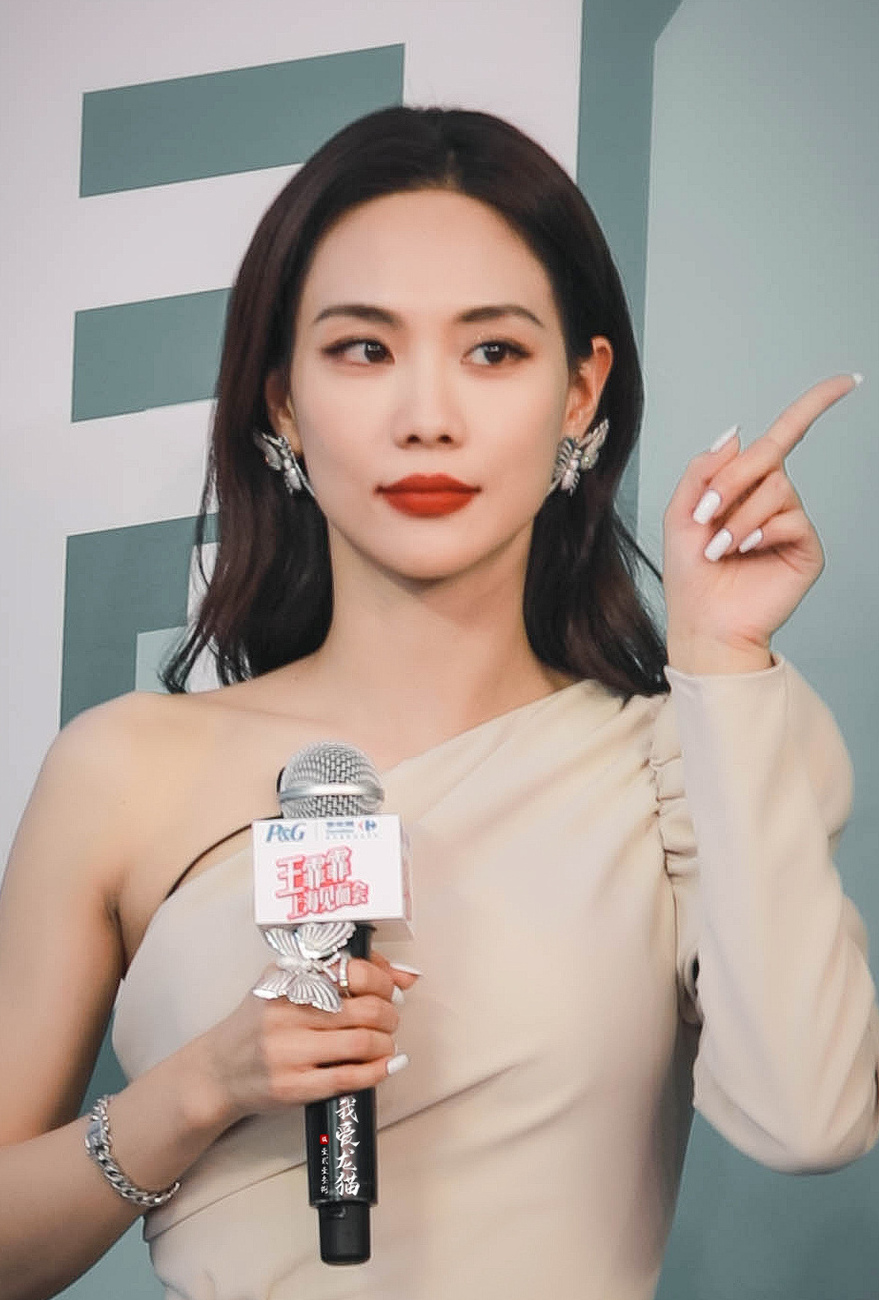
- Fei in 2020
- Born: Wang Feifei; April 27, 1987 (age 39); Haikou, Hainan, China
- Occupations: Singer; actress
- Musical career
- Genres: K-pop; C-pop
- Instrument: Vocals
- Years active: 2010–present
- Labels: JYP; Huayi Brothers; Wang Feifei Studio
- Formerly of: Miss A; JYP Nation

Chinese name
- Chinese: 王霏霏
- Hanyu Pinyin: Wáng Fēifēi
- Hanyu Pinyin: Wáng Fēifēi
- Yale Romanization: Wòhng Fēifēi
- Jyutping: Wong^{4} Fei^{1} Fei^{1}

Korean name
- Hangul: 페이
- Revised Romanization: Pei
- McCune–Reischauer: P'ei

Wang Feifei (Chinese: 王霏霏; born April 27, 1987), known professionally as Fei, is a Chinese singer and actress. She was a member of the South Korean girl group miss A from the group's debut in 2010 until its disbandment in 2017. She debuted as a solo artist in 2016 in Korea with the mini album "Fantasy". After departing Korea in 2018, Fei has been pursuing her solo career in mainland China. In 2021, Fei released Chinese mini album "Fearless", an independent production by Wang Feifei Studio. She had also ventured into acting in China with roles in My Marvelous Fable and One and Only.

== Early life ==
Fei was born Wang Feifei on April 27, 1987, in Haikou, Hainan, China. She displayed a talent for dancing at an early age and went to study dance at a school in Guangzhou, where her talents caught the eye of JYP Entertainment in 2007. She later attended Seoul Institute of the Arts, alongside miss A member Jia.

Prior to debuting in South Korea, Fei appeared in a dance audition show at Zhejiang TV in 2009 and became a member of the project group, Sisters, the Chinese version of the Wonder Girls. However, changes within the company led to the project group's early termination.

== Career ==
=== 2010–2017: miss A ===
In March 2010, Fei, with fellow members Jia and Suzy, formed the group miss A. The trio began promoting in China by releasing the song "Love Again" for Samsung Electronics' Samsung Beat Festival. The group was later joined by a fourth member, Min. The four-member girl group made their debut in South Korea in July 2010, under the management of JYP Entertainment, with the hit single "Bad Girl Good Girl." Over the next several years, the group released a series of successful albums and singles, including "I Don't Need a Man," "Hush," "Touch," "Only You," and "Good-bye Baby" etc.

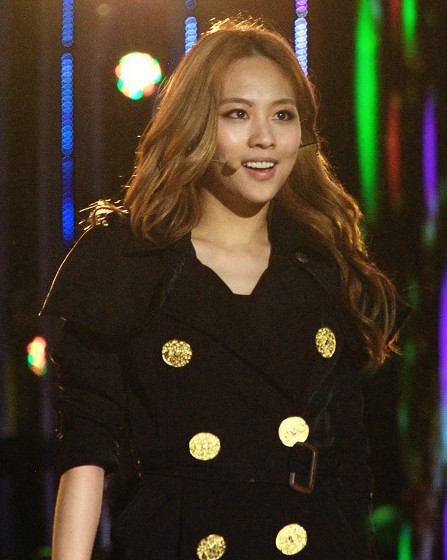
Fei in 2011

In addition to music, Fei made her acting debut with cameo appearances in the KBS drama Dream High in 2011 and its sequel in 2012.

In 2013, she appeared on the South Korean variety shows, MasterChef Korea Celebrity and Dancing with the Stars 3, in which she won second place and first place, respectively. She appeared on the Chinese reality show, If You Love, in 2014. That same year, she made a cameo appearance in the SBS drama Temptation, and contributed the song, "One Summer Night," featuring 2AM member Jo Kwon, to the soundtrack.

In 2015, Fei was confirmed to star in the web drama Swan, alongside Nam Gyu-ri and Cho Min Sung. She was also confirmed to star in the Chinese movie, Select Game.. For miss A's mini album 'Colors' (Chinese version), Fei made an attempt to write lyrics for the songs "I Caught Ya" and "Stuck".

After the departure of Jia in May 2016 and Min in November 2017, miss A disbanded in December 2017. In 2017, Billboard ranked miss A at number ten on their "Top 10 K-pop Girl Groups of the Past Decade" list.

=== 2016–2017: Solo career debut ===
Fei made her solo singing debut in Korea on July 21, 2016, with the digital single "Fantasy". The title track "괜찮아 괜찮아 Fantasy" was ranked #14 on the 20 best K-pop songs of 2016 by Billboard critics. Other tracks in the album include "Sweet Sexy Fei" and "One More Kiss".

=== 2018–present: Rising popularity in China ===
==== Music and entertainment shows ====
On September 17, 2018, Fei collaborated with Gen Neo in the single "Will You Won't You". It was the first time Fei was involved in production works as a composer, lyricist and singer.

By December 8 of the same year, Fei dropped another single, "Hello", including a rap featuring from Jackson Wang. The following January, Fei confirmed that she had parted ways with JYP Entertainment in late 2018 after her contract expired.

In January 2019, Fei joined Youku's idol group survival show, All for One (以团之名), as the dance coach and one of the judges. Her discerning coaching style and candid critiques resonated with fans, sparking significant discussions on China's major social platforms Weibo and Bilibili.

In June 2020, Fei participated the female celebrity idol group reality show Sisters Who Make Waves (乘风破浪的姐姐), centered around the themes of women's empowerment and self-realization. Featuring 30 celebrities aged 30 and above competing for a spot in a seven-member girl group, the show skyrocketed in popularity and became China's most-watched entertainment program for the year. Fei emerged as one of the top contenders, and despite not making the final cut for the girl group, her rising star didn't go unnoticed. In Weibo's 2020 Entertainment White Paper, she clinched the top spot among the 30 participants in terms of surging popularity.

Following the success, Fei went on to join another popular variety show, I Am The Actor (我就是演员), in December 2020. Under the mentorship of Zhang Ziyi, Fei progressed to the finals and won the "Bright Star" award.

On August 12, 2021, Fei unveiled "Stalker 窥探者", the title track of her much-anticipated Chinese mini album "Fearless 不霏". Produced by Wang Feifei Studio and with Fei at the helm as Executive Producer, "Stalker" is an anthem championing women to stand against manipulation and gaslighting. After its release, the song's music video amassed over 12 million views on Weibo in under 12 hour and received widespread accolades and rave reviews. "Stalker" climbed to the top spot on the weekly Rising Popularity chart (2021.08.09 - 2021.08.15) at QQ Music, China's largest music streaming platform.

On October 25, 2021, "Hunting Adonis 狩猎阿多尼斯", the 2nd single of the album, was released. Inspired by Shakespeare's portrayal of the unconventional romance between Venus and Adonis, this song encourages people, especially women, to ardently pursue their love and passion. Within the song's narrative, Adonis epitomizes transcendent beauty, love and moments of revival and awakening.

On December 2, 2021, the rollout of the 3rd and final single, "Freaky Cinderella 疯狂灰姑娘", marked the full release of the album. With its catchy melody and novel lyrics, the song paints a metaphorical wonderland for those who dare to be different. It boldly embodies Fei's vision of shattering conventions in pursuit of freedom and self-discovery. In April 2022, the physical album of "Fearless" hit the shelves, distinguished by its lavish photography and meticulous graphic design.

On December 20, 2021, Fei delighted her fans amid the holiday season with the release of "At Christmas", a cozy and romantic Christmas duet co-created with Chinese singer-songwriter Ryan. B.

In April 2022, Fei joined Youku's hit dance variety show, Great Dance Crew (了不起! 舞社), as one of the four dance team leaders. The show brought together 60 female dancers from all walks of life, challenging them to ascend the ranks and ultimately assemble an elite dance crew destined for the World Hip Hop Dance Championship.

==== Acting ====
Along with her music releases and presence on stage and in entertainment shows, Fei has diversified her career, placing a growing emphasis on acting. In June 2023, the much-anticipated web series My Marvelous Fable (夏日奇妙书) aired on Mango TV, portraying Fei in the lead role as a whimsical best-selling writer. By July, Fei took on a supporting role as a dance crew leader in the dance-themed cinematic hit One and Only (热烈). The film amassed over USD $100 million in its first two weeks of release in China and was premiered in Southeast Asia, the U.S. and the UK in August 2023, garnering even wider international acclaim.

== Other ventures ==
=== Brand partnerships ===
In recent years, Fei has garnered millions of followers on major Chinese social platforms, such as Weibo, Red, Douyin and Bilibili. She has cemented her reputation as an influencer and trendsetter (人间种草机) through uncovering and sharing beauty and lifestyle tips in her vlog series. According to CBNData, Fei claimed the top spot in the "Celebrity Influence in Beauty" rankings for the first two quarters of 2021. Her credibility and wholesome image have fostered collaborations with an array of brands spanning beauty, clothing, footwear and food & beverage sectors. Between 2020 and 2022, she was the brand ambassador for Bebe, OUAI, Sephora Collection Makeup, Skechers, Kahlua, Rituals, L'Oréal Paris hair color, Dr.Ci:Labo and Sisley Paris Sisleÿa in China. She previously collaborated with luxury fashion powerhouses like Louis Vuitton, Celine, and Fendi and avant-garde designers like Creepyyeha. In July 2022, Balmain introduced its QIXI capsule collection in honor of Chinese Valentine's Day, presenting Fei as the face of the campaign. As of 2023, she continues to serve as the brand ambassador for Michael Kors in Greater China and Unilever in China.

=== E-commerce endeavors ===
On September 26, 2021, Fei ventured into hosting livestream shopping sessions for Alibaba's e-commerce platform Tmall. Her inaugural livestream drew nearly 3 million viewers and brought about 74 million views to the hashtag "Tmall Celebrity Pick" on Weibo.

In 2022, Fei debuted her own pilot e-commerce platform, Play Beauty (玩美好物), selling beauty and fashion products to her fan base and general beauty shoppers.

== Discography ==
=== EPs ===
Title	Details
Fearless (不霏Fearless)	Released: December 2, 2021 (CHN); Label: Wang Feifei Studio; Formats: CD, digital download, streaming; Track listing: 1. "Stalker" (Stalker窥探者); 2. "Hunting Adonis" (狩猎阿多尼斯); 3. "Freaky Cinderella" (疯狂灰姑娘)
TAKE A POSE	Released: January 16, 2024 (CHN); Label: Wang Feifei Studio; Formats: digital download, streaming; Track listing: 1. "TAKE A POSE"; 2. "EAT THAT CAKE"; 3. "Last Bit Of Gentleness" (feat. Ryan.B) (最后的温柔)
TOOOOO BUSY	Released: July 10, 2024 (CHN); Label: Wang Feifei Studio; Formats: digital download, streaming; Track listing: 1. "TOOOOO BUSY"; 2. "OMW"; 3. "Forty-fourth Sunset" (四十四次落日)

=== Single albums ===
Title	Details
Fantasy	Released: July 21, 2016 (KOR); Released: August 12, 2016 (CHN); Label: JYP Entertainment; Formats: CD, digital download, streaming; Track listing: 1. "Sweet Sexy Fei"; 2. "Fantasy" (괜찮아 괜찮아 Fantasy); 3. "One More Kiss"; Fantasy (Chinese Ver.) -; 1. "Sweet Sexy Fei (Chinese Version)"; 2. "Fantasy" (不要急 Fantasy); 3. "One More Kiss (Chinese Version)"

=== Singles ===
Year	Title	Peak chart positions			Album
Year	Title	KOR	US World	CHN V Chart	Album
	Korean				
2016	"Fantasy" (괜찮아 괜찮아 Fantasy)	153	6	—	Fantasy (single album)
	Chinese				
2016	"One More Kiss"	—	—	11	Fantasy (single album)
2018	"Will You Won't You" (你會不會) (with Gen Neo)	—	—	—	Non-album singles
2018	"Hello" (feat. Jackson Wang)	—	—	3	Non-album singles
2021	"Stalker" (窥探者)	—	—	—N/a	Fearless
2021	"Hunting Adonis" (狩猎阿多尼斯)	—	—	—N/a	Fearless
2021	"Freaky Cinderella" (疯狂灰姑娘)	—	—	—N/a	Fearless
2021	"At Christmas" (with Ryan.B)	—	—	—N/a	Non-album singles
2023	"Celestial Distance" (天体距离)	—	—	—N/a	Non-album singles
2024	"TAKE A POSE"	—	—	—N/a	TAKE A POSE
2024	"TOOOOO BUSY"	—	—	—N/a	TOOOOO BUSY
2024	"OMW! "	—	—	—N/a	TOOOOO BUSY
2024	"Forty-fourth Sunset" (四十四次落日)	—	—	—N/a	TOOOOO BUSY
	"—" denotes releases that did not chart or were not released in that region.				

=== Soundtrack appearances ===
Year	Title	Peak chart positions	Album
Year	Title	KOR	Album
	Korean		
2014	"One Summer Night" feat. Jo Kwon	49	Temptation OST
	Chinese		
2018	"Heart full of Rain" (心雨)	—	Cover The Sky OST
2018	"Shall We Fall in Love" (勇往直前恋上你) with Tianyu Zhao	—	Shall We Fall In Love OST
2018	"Don't Want to Say Goodbye" (不想说再见)	—	Shall We Fall In Love OST
2019	"Fragmented" (零落成辉) (with Gen Neo)	—	Kyoto Monster Fox OST
2020	"Always I Believe" (为你相信) with Han Mubo	—	Fairyland Lovers OST
2022	"Only Love You" (偏偏喜欢你)	—	Cantonese Sounds·Youth Reset Project Special OST
2023	"Chinese Dream, My Dream" (中国梦 我的梦) With various (Note: Song Yi, Zhou Shen, INTO1, Tan Weiwei, Ayanga, Shan Yichun, Mao Xiaotong, Nazha, Qiao Xin, Zhang Qi, Liu Xijun, Li Xiang, Li Sidney, Gao Hanyu, Pakho Chau, Zhang Yixing, Zhou Bichang, Wu Kequn, Zhang Yu'an, Lu Hu, Wang Yuexin, Wang Xinling, Chen Xiaochun, Raymond Lam, Zhao Liying, Gong Jun, Zhang Yunlong, Bai Yu, Li Guangjie, Wang Linkai, Wang Sulong, Xilinnayi Gao, Zhou Yang, Dong Youlin, AIR, Dong Baoshi, Jin Zhiwen, Meng Ran, Tu Honggang, Yi Yan, Zheng Chuang, Tia Ray, Wang Hedi, Phoenix Legend, Yu Shuxin, Hua Chenyu, Wu Lei, Du Dewei, Angela Hui, Wang Dongcheng, Michelle Chen, Zhao Jinmai, Ye Qisheng, Jiang Qianru, Zhao Chaofan, Ren Xianqi & others)	—	Chinese Dream, My Dream (中国梦·我的梦)
2023	"Freeze Here" (在此定格) with Wei Zhe Ming	—	My Marvelous Fable OST

== Filmography ==
=== Films ===
Year	Title	Role	Notes
2019	Dancing Elephant	Ji Shuangshuang	Contestant of "Free Dance Competition"
2020	The Choice	TBA	(completed, release date to be determined)
2023	One and Only	Chilli	Closing film for 25th SIFF, release date on July 28, 2023

=== Drama ===
Year	Title	Role	Network	Notes
2011	Dream High	Flashmob dancer	KBS2	Cameo (Episode 16)
2012	Dream High 2	Herself	KBS2	Cameo (Episode 15)
2014	Temptation	Jenny	SBS	Cameo (Episode 1)
2017	Swan	Woo Jeu	Draemong	Web drama; Supporting role
2018	Cover the Sky	Qin Di	QQLive	Fei's first Chinese drama
2018	Shall We Fall in Love	Liang Ding Fei	Tencent Video	Chinese drama
2022	My Marvellous Fable	Wang Pu Tao	Mango TV	Chinese drama

=== Variety shows ===
Year	Title	Network	Notes
2013	MasterChef Korea Celebrity	O'live	Contestant
2013	O'live Show	O'live	MC
2013	Dancing with the Stars	MBC	Contestant
2013	Amazing Dance	HBS	Judge
2014	The Great Magician	CCTV	Contestant
2014	SBS Cooking Korea	SBS	Contestant
2014	I am a Legend	Qinghai Television	Contestant
2015	Sixteen	Mnet	Mentor
2015	Fists Of Shaolin Temple	SBS	Host
2019	All For One	Youku	Dance Instructor
2019	bar Persona	SBS Mobidic	Co-host with Seo In-young (Xu In-young) and SeoOk
2020	Sisters Who Make Waves	Mango TV	Contestant
2020–2022	Go for Spring	Mango TV	Host
2022	GREAT DANCE CREW	Youku	Manager
2023	Natural High	Tencent Video	Recurring member

=== Radio shows ===
Year	Title	Role	Network	Notes
2013–2015	Idols, True Colors	Host	MBC C-Radio	with Jia & Super Junior-M's Zhou Mi

=== Event hosting ===
Year	Event	Notes
2015	29th Golden Disc Awards	With Kim Sung-Joo and Kim Jong-Kook
2016	13th Asia Song Festival	With Leeteuk

== Awards and nominations ==
Year	Award	Category	Nominated work	Result
2013	Dancing with the Stars 3	1st Place	—N/a	Won
2013	Master Chef Korea Celebrity	2nd Place	—N/a	Won
2014	Cook King Korea	2nd Place	—N/a	Won
2015	9th SBS Entertainment Awards	Best Teamwork Award	Fists of Shaolin Temple	Won
2016	China Trends Health Awards	Health Leading Award	—N/a	Won
