= Kim Gyu-ri (actress, born August 1979) =

South Korean actress (born 1979)

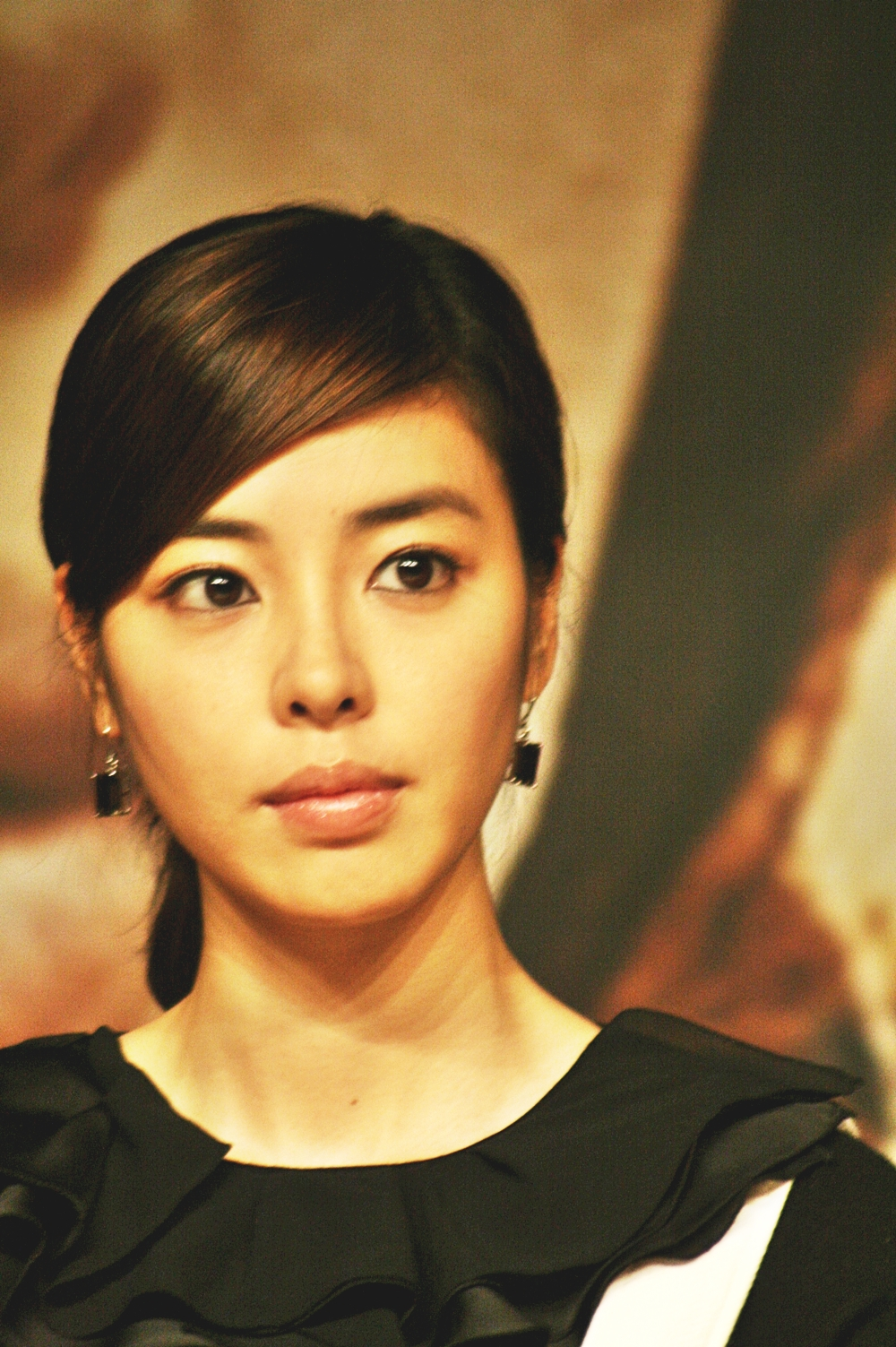
- Kim in November 2007
- Born: Kim Min-sun; August 16, 1979 (age 47); Anyang, South Korea
- Education: Dongduk Women's University - Broadcasting and Entertainment
- Occupation: Actress
- Years active: 1998–present
- Agents: MBK Entertainment; Yesung HSM Entertainment

Korean name
- Hangul: 김규리
- RR: Gim Gyuri
- MR: Kim Kyuri

Former name
- Hangul: 김민선
- RR: Gim Minseon
- MR: Kim Minsŏn

Kim Gyu-ri (Korean: 김규리; born Kim Min-sun (Korean: 김민선) on 16 August 1979) is a South Korean actress best known for the film Portrait of a Beauty (2008).

== Biography ==
She was involved in a controversy in 2008 when she made a statement against eating beef imported from the United States; this led to a lawsuit by a beef importer in Seoul but the courts ruled in her favor in 2010. She also spoke out in behalf of entertainers' invasion of privacy regarding the explosive "Entertainment X-file" issue in 2005. In 2009 she officially changed her name from Kim Min-sun to Kim Gyu-ri. She dated Kim Joo-hyuk, her co-star in period drama God of War, from 2012 to 2013.

== Filmography ==
=== Television series ===
Year	Title	Role
1999	School 1	Park Na-ri
2000	Medical Center	Jo Soo-ahn
2001	Morning Without Parting	
2001	Like Father Unlike Son	Lee Su-jin
2002	Glass Slippers	Woo Seung-hee
2002	I Love You Hyun-jung	Lee Hyun-jung
2003	Fairy and Swindler	Song Kyung-sook
2004	Ode to the Han River	Yoon Na-young
2005	Loveholic	Lee Yeol-joo
2005	Young-jae's Golden Days	Joo Young-jae
2010	MBC Best Theater: "We Teach Love"	Lee Jin-yi
2010	KBS Drama Special: "Just Say It!"	Choi Young-hee
2012	God of War	Choi Song-yi
2013	The Scandal	Jang Joo-ha
2014	Cunning Single Lady	Gook Yeo-jin
2014	The King's Face	Gwi-in Kim
2016–2017	Our Gap-soon	Heo Da-hae
2018	About Time	Kim Joon-ah
2019	Designated Survivor: 60 Days	Choi Kang-yeon
2022	Green Mothers' Club	Seo Jin-ha
2024	1980: The Unforgettable Day	chul-soo mother
2025	The Pact	Yoon-myung ja

=== Variety show ===
Year	Title	Notes/Ref.
2011	Dancing with the Stars	Contestant (Season 1); Host (Seasons 2–3)
2012	Dancing with the Stars	Contestant (Season 1); Host (Seasons 2–3)
2014	Law of the Jungle in Solomon Islands	Cast member
2022	Korean Food Chronicle	Presenter; Episode 1–4

=== Hosting ===
Year	Title	Notes	Ref.
2021	25th Bucheon International Fantastic Film Festival	with Lee Seon and Li Woo-jin	
2021	15th Asian Film Awards	with Lee Seung-guk	
2022	2022 Pyeongchang International Peace Film Festival	with Kim Joo-hun	

=== Music video appearances ===
Year	Song Title	Artist
2002	"Elevator"	Park Jin-young
2004	"Love Is More Beautiful When You Can't Have It"	Tony An
2004	"Sunflower"	Park Sang-min
2009	"Love... That Guy"	Bobby Kim
2010	"I'll Hure More"	Hwanhee
2011	"It Hurts"	Yangpa

== Bibliography ==
Year	Title	Notes	ISBN
2009	Sunny Side Story	photo-essays	ISBN 978-89-960484-4-2
2012	내 앞에 봄이 와 있다		ISBN 978-89-59137060

== Awards and nominations ==
Year	Award-giving body	Category	Nominated work(s)	Result
2000	36th Baeksang Arts Awards	Best New Actress	Memento Mori	Won
2000	20th Korean Association of Film Critics Awards	Best New Actress	Memento Mori	Won
2001	KBS Drama Awards	Best New Actress	Like Father, Unlike Son	Won
2002	MBC Drama Awards	Best New Actress	I Love You, Hyun-jung	Won
2002	SBS Drama Awards	Best Supporting Actress	Glass Slippers	Won
2004	MBC Drama Awards	Excellence Award, Actress	Ode to the Han River	Won
2009	45th Baeksang Arts Awards	Best Actress	Portrait of a Beauty	Nominated
2009	46th Grand Bell Awards	Best Actress	Portrait of a Beauty	Nominated
2011	Dancing with the Stars	Season 1: Second Place	—N/a	Won
2012	MBC Entertainment Awards	Popularity Award, MC category	Dancing with the Stars	Won
2012	MBC Drama Awards	Top Excellence Award, Actress in a Serial Drama	God of War	Nominated
2013	MBC Drama Awards	Excellence Award, Actress in a Special Project Drama	The Scandal	Nominated
2022	Seoul International Drama Awards	Asian Star Award (Korea)	—N/a	Won
