= Hye-rim Park =

South Korean model (born 1985)

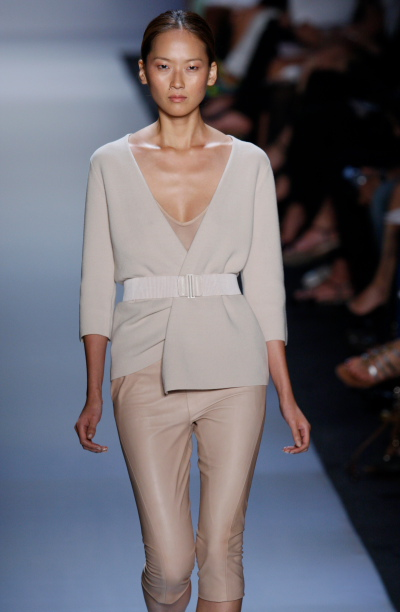
- Hye Rim Park in the Maxazria Spring 2009 fashion show
- Born: January 17, 1985 (age 41); Seoul, South Korea
- Modeling information
- Height: 5 ft 9.5 in (1.77 m)
- Hair color: Black
- Eye color: Brown
- Agency: The Model CoOp (New York); VIVA Model Management (Paris)

Hye-rim Park (Korean: 박혜림; born January 17, 1985), also known as Hye Park, is a South Korean born American model. Park made her runway debut during the Fall/Winter 2005 season.

== Career ==
Her big break came in early 2005, when Steven Meisel shot her for Italian Vogue prior to the fall 2005 shows. After the shoot, she went to walk for major shows including Marc Jacobs and Anna Sui in New York. Her real big break, however, came when Miuccia Prada and Russell Marsh cast her in the Prada and Miu Miu shows during Milan Fashion Week. She became the first non-white model since Naomi Campbell in 1997 to walk the show, and just the very first Asian model to walk for Prada. Prada is one of the most influential runway shows to book for an upcoming model. The Prada/Miu Miu bookings led to a flurry of bookings in Paris (Balenciaga, Chloe, Lanvin, Rochas).

Park has appeared on the catwalk for designers such as Christian Dior, Chanel, Louis Vuitton, Max Azria, Alexander McQueen, and Burberry. She has also collaborated with famous photographers like Steven Meisel, Mario Testino, Steven Klein, Annie Leibovitz, Patrick Demarchelier, Arthur Elgort, Craig McDean, David Sims, Mario Sorrenti, Ellen von Unwerth, Mikael Jannsen, Greg Kadel, Laurie Bartley, Nathaniel Goldberg, Terry Tsiolis, and many more. Her trademarks are mole just beneath her nose and her face bone structure.

Park has appeared in editorials for many magazines, including Vogue (American, French, Italian, Chinese and Korean editions), Flair, Numero, Allure, New York Times, Pop, Harper's Baazar, and others. She posed for international campaigns for Roberto Cavalli, Dolce & Gabbana, D&G, H&M, M.A.C. Cosmetics, GAP, Le Printemps, Marc Jacobs, Cesare Paciotti, Tiffany & Co, MaxMara, Saks Fifth Ave, Plastic Island and Love, Sex, Money. She has also been the face of Korean brands H&T (Hangten) and KeraSys. She speaks English and Korean.

In 2011, during the 2011 Fall/Winter collections at Paris Fashion Week, Park became the first ethnic Asian to model for two French fashion brands, Balmain and Isabel Marant who are reputed for hiring white models only.

== Personal life ==
Park was born in Seoul, South Korea, but immigrated to Salt Lake City, Utah when she was a young teen. She was discovered at an open casting call while attending the University of Utah in 2004. As one of the few Asian models on the international high fashion scene, Park's debut in Fall 2005 was strong – Vogue magazine named her one of the top 10 models. According to Xinhua News, Park's rise on the fashion scene – along with other East Asian supermodels Du Juan and Anne Watanabe – coincides with the renewed Western interest in Asia.

In June 2008, she married her boyfriend of three years.
