= List of Radio Star episodes =

This is a list of episodes of the South Korean talk show Radio Star (Korean: 라디오스타) which is currently hosted by Kim Gook-jin, Kim Gu-ra, Yoo Se-yoon and Jang Do-yeon. It airs on MBC every Wednesday at 23:10 (KST) starting May 30, 2007.

== 2007 ==
List of episodes (2007)

Radio Star #	Golden Fishery #	Broadcast Date	Guests	Notes
1	44	May 30, 2007	Jung Hyung-don	First airing. MCs: Shin Jung-hwan, Yoon Jong-shin, Kim Gu-ra
2	45	June 6, 2007	Kim Jong-seo	A new MC is introduced: Shindong (Super Junior)
3	46	June 13, 2007	Kim Jong-seo	
4	47	June 20, 2007	Ji Sang-ryeol	
5	48	June 27, 2007	Ji Sang-ryeol	
6	49	July 4, 2007	Yoo Yeong-seok	
7	50	July 11, 2007	Yoo Yeong-seok	
8	51	July 18, 2007	Yoon Do-hyun	
9	52	August 1, 2007	Yoon Do-hyun	
10	53	August 8, 2007	Nam Gyu-ri and Kim Young-chul	
11	54	August 15, 2007	Kim Dong-wan (Shinhwa)	
12	55	August 22, 2007	Kim Dong-wan (Shinhwa)	
13	56	August 29, 2007	Fly to the Sky (Hwanhee, Brian Joo)	
14	57	September 5, 2007	Shin Hye-sung (Shinhwa)	Shindong's last episode as an MC. Kim Gook-jin replaces him.
15	58	September 12, 2007	The Grace	Kim Gook-jin's first episode as an MC
16	59	September 19, 2007	The Grace	
17	60	September 26, 2007	Bong Tae-gyu	
18	61	October 3, 2007	Clazziquai Project (Horan, Alex Chu) and Crown J	
19	62	October 10, 2007	Clazziquai Project (Horan, Alex Chu) and Crown J	
20	63	October 17, 2007	Kang Soo-jung	
21	64	October 24, 2007	Kang Soo-jung	
22	65	October 31, 2007	Yangpa and Eru	
23	66	November 7, 2007	Wheesung	
24	67	November 14, 2007	Wheesung	
25	68	November 21, 2007	Super Junior (Heechul, Kangin, Leeteuk, Shindong)	
26	69	November 28, 2007	Lee Seung-hwan	
27	70	December 5, 2007	Lee Seung-hwan	
28	71	December 12, 2007	Park Jin-young	
29	72	December 26, 2007	Park Jin-young	

== 2008 ==
List of episodes (2008)

Radio Star #	Broadcast Date	Guests	Notes
30	January 3, 2008	Park Jin-young	
31	January 9, 2008	Lee Seung-chul	
32	January 16, 2008	Lee Seung-chul	
33	January 23, 2008	Park Jung-ah and Bae Seul-ki	Organised as such due to Hwang Jung-min's special appearance on The Knee Drop Guru
34	January 30, 2008	Park Jung-ah and Bae Seul-ki	
35	February 6, 2008	Jo Han-sun	
36	February 9, 2008		Special feature on Golden Fishery
37	February 13, 2008	Cha Tae-hyun	Hong Kyung-min made a special appearance in the middle of the recording
38	February 20, 2008	Cha Tae-hyun	Song Hye-kyo made a special appearance over the phone, during the recording
39	February 27, 2008	Hong Kyung-min and Lee Soo-young	
40	March 5, 2008	Hong Kyung-min and Lee Soo-young	
41	March 12, 2008	Park Sang-min and Min Kyung-hoon	
42	March 19, 2008	Park Sang-min and Min Kyung-hoon	
43	March 26, 2008	(Shinhwa) Andy Lee and Lee Min-woo	
44	April 2, 2008	(Shinhwa) Andy Lee and Lee Min-woo	
45	April 16, 2008	Park Joon-hyung and Jeong Jong-cheol	
46	April 23, 2008	Park Joon-hyung and Jeong Jong-cheol	
47	April 30, 2008	Epik High	
48	May 7, 2008	Epik High	
49	May 14, 2008	Gummy, Kim Hyun-joong and Kim Kyu-jong	
50	May 21, 2008	Gummy, Kim Hyun-joong and Kim Kyu-jong	
51	May 28, 2008	MC Mong and Kim Jang-hoon	
52	June 4, 2008	MC Mong and Kim Jang-hoon	
53	June 11, 2008	Ko Young-wook, Sung Dae-hyun and Shin Dong-wook	
54	June 18, 2008	Ko Young-wook, Sung Dae-hyun and Shin Dong-wook	
55	June 25, 2008	Ko Young-wook, Sung Dae-hyun and Shin Dong-wook	
56	July 2, 2008	Choi Jin-young and Shin Ae	In reality, there were 56 errors in the room.
57	July 9, 2008	Choi Jin-young and Shin Ae	
58	July 16, 2008	Sung Si-kyung	
59	July 23, 2008	Yoon Jung-hee, Nam Gyu-ri and Kim Bum	
60	July 30, 2008	Kim Hyun-jung, Shin Ji and Hwangbo	
61	August 13, 2008	Kim Hyun-jung, Shin Ji and Hwangbo	No broadcast on August 20 and August 27, due to The Knee Drop Guru
62	September 3, 2008	Sul Woon Do and Jang Yoon-jeong	
63	September 17, 2008	Sul Woon Do and Jang Yoon-jeong	
64	September 24, 2008	Kim Heung-gook and Kim Tae-woon	
65	October 1, 2008	Kim Heung-gook and Kim Tae-woon	
66	October 8, 2008	SG Wannabe and Younha	
67	October 15, 2008	SG Wannabe and Younha	
68	October 22, 2008	Kim Gun-mo and Ock Joo-hyun	Due to The Knee Drop Guru, the second part was edited to meet the "5-minute schedule".
69	October 29, 2008	Kim Gun-mo and Ock Joo-hyun	
70	November 5, 2008	Kim Gun-mo and Ock Joo-hyun	
71	November 12, 2008	Byun Jin-sub and Kim C	
72	November 19, 2008	Byun Jin-sub and Kim C	
73	November 26, 2008	Jeung Jun-ha, Kim Won-jun and Tei	
74	December 3, 2008	Jeung Jun-ha, Kim Won-jun and Tei	
75	December 10, 2008	Tak Jae-hoon, Kim Jong-kook and Wheesung	
76	December 17, 2008	Tak Jae-hoon, Kim Jong-kook and Wheesung	
77	December 24, 2008	Tak Jae-hoon, Kim Jong-kook and Wheesung; Christmas Special – Goose Band (Kim Heung-gook, Kim Tae-won, Hong Seo-beom, Yoo Young-seok and Taeyeon (Girls' Generation)	

== 2009 ==
List of episodes (2009)

Radio Star #	Broadcast Date	Guests	Notes
78	January 14, 2009	Lee Hyun-woo, Yoon Sang and Kim Hyun-chul	
79	January 21, 2009	Lee Hyun-woo, Yoon Sang and Kim Hyun-chul	
80	January 28, 2009	Boom, Lee Soo-geun and Daesung	
81	February 4, 2009	Boom, Lee Soo-geun and Daesung	
82	February 18, 2009	Boom, Lee Soo-geun and Daesung	
83	February 25, 2009	Girls' Generation (Jessica, Tiffany, Sunny, Sooyoung)	
84	March 4, 2009	Girls' Generation (Jessica, Tiffany, Sunny, Sooyoung)	
85	March 11, 2009	Lee Kwang-gi, Jo Se-ho and Park Seul-gi	
86	March 18, 2009	Lee Kwang-gi, Jo Se-ho and Park Seul-gi	
87	March 25, 2009	Fly to the Sky and Norazo	
88	April 1, 2009	Fly to the Sky and Norazo	
89	April 8, 2009	Shin Hye-sung (Shinhwa) and Lee Ji-hoon	
90	April 15, 2009	Moon Hee-joon (H.O.T), Yoon Do-hyun and Sung Jin-woo	
91	April 22, 2009	Moon Hee-joon (H.O.T), Yoon Do-hyun and Sung Jin-woo	
92	April 29, 2009	Kim Jung-min, Lee Sung-jin and Park Jung-min	
93	May 6, 2009	Kim Jung-min, Lee Sung-jin and Park Jung-min	
94	May 13, 2009	Kim Jung-min, Lee Sung-jin and Park Jung-min	
95	May 20, 2009	Oh Young-sil and Park Ji-yoon	
96	June 3, 2009	Epik High and K.Will	
97	June 10, 2009	Epik High and K.Will	
98	June 24, 2009	Roo'ra	
99	July 1, 2009	Roo'ra	
100	July 8, 2009	Roo'ra	The 100th episode anniversary was also celebrated.
101	July 15, 2009	Brother Band (Shin Dong-yup, Tak Jae-hoon, Lee Sung-min, Kim Jung-mo, Yoo Young-seok)	
102	July 22, 2009	Brother Band (Shin Dong-yup, Tak Jae-hoon, Lee Sung-min, Kim Jung-mo, Yoo Young-seok)	
103	July 29, 2009	T-ara	
104	August 5, 2009	Yoo Se-yoon, Jang Dong-min and Yoo Sang-moo	
105	August 12, 2009	Yoo Se-yoon, Jang Dong-min and Yoo Sang-moo	
106	August 19, 2009	Kyeon Mi-ri, Lee Kyeong-shil, Lee Bong-won and Park Mi-sun	
107	August 26, 2009	Kyeon Mi-ri, Lee Kyeong-shil, Lee Bong-won and Park Mi-sun	
108	September 2, 2009	Noise, Eun Ji-won, MC Mong and Im Hyung-joon	
109	September 9, 2009	Noise, Eun Ji-won, MC Mong and Im Hyung-joon	
110	September 16, 2009	Noise, Eun Ji-won, MC Mong and Im Hyung-joon	
111	September 23, 2009	Cool (Lee Jae-hoon, Kim Sung-soo, Yuri) and Yoo Chae-yeong	
112	September 30, 2009	Jewelry	
113	October 7, 2009	Jewelry	
114	October 14, 2009	Tei, Alex Chu and Kim Tae-woo	
115	October 21, 2009	Tei, Alex Chu and Kim Tae-woo	
116	October 28, 2009	Tei, Alex Chu and Kim Tae-woo	
117	November 4, 2009	Lee Seung-chul and Bom Yeoreum Gaeul Kyeoul	
118	November 11, 2009	Lee Seung-chul and Bom Yeoreum Gaeul Kyeoul	
119	November 18, 2009	Oh Sang-jin, Moon Ji-ae, Shindong and Kim Jong-wook	Guest MC: Tak Jae-hoon
120	November 25, 2009	Oh Sang-jin, Moon Ji-ae, Shindong and Kim Jong-wook	Guest MC: Tak Jae-hoon
121	December 2, 2009	SS501	
122	December 9, 2009	SS501	
123	December 16, 2009	SS501	
124	December 23, 2009	Yurisangja and Shin Seung-hun	
125	December 24, 2009	Seohyun (Girls' Generation), Shin Seung-hun and Yurisangja	Christmas Special: Radio Star Folk Concert

== 2010 ==
List of episodes (2010)

Episode #	Broadcast Date	Guests	Notes
125	January 6, 2010	Kim Jong-min, Chun Myung-hoon, Noh Yoo-min	
126	January 13, 2010	Kim Jong-min, Chun Myung-hoon, Noh Yoo-min	
127	January 20, 2010	Lee Hong-gi, Lee Chang-min, Jo Kwon, Jung Yong-hwa	
128	January 27, 2010	Lee Hong-gi, Lee Chang-min, Jo Kwon, Jung Yong-hwa	
129	February 3, 2010	Seo Kyung-seok, Lee Yoon-seok	
130	February 10, 2010	Seo Kyung-seok, Lee Yoon-seok	
131	February 17, 2010	Seo Kyung-seok, Lee Yoon-seok	
132	February 24, 2010	Kim Jong-kook, Park Hyun-bin, Min Kyung-hoon	
133	March 3, 2010	Kim Jong-kook, Park Hyun-bin, Min Kyung-hoon	
134	March 10, 2010	Clon, Park Mi-kyung	
135	March 17, 2010	Clon, Park Mi-kyung	
136	March 24, 2010	Clon, Park Mi-kyung	
137	April 7, 2010	Yu Oh-seong, Kim Dong-wook	
138	May 19, 2010	Yu Oh-seong, Kim Dong-wook	
139	May 26, 2010	Rain	
140	June 9, 2010	Rain	
141	June 16, 2010	f(x)	
142	June 23, 2010	f(x)	
143	June 30, 2010	Son Dam-bi, Kahi, Kim Jung-ah, Nana	
144	July 7, 2010	Son Dam-bi, Kahi, Kim Jung-ah, Nana	
145	July 14, 2010	Son Dam-bi, Kahi, Kim Jung-ah, Nana	
146	July 24, 2010	Kim Heung-gook, Kim Kyung-sik, Kim Kyung Jin	
147	July 28, 2010	Kim Heung-gook, Kim Kyung-sik, Kim Kyung Jin	
148	August 4, 2010	Kim Heung-gook, Kim Kyung-sik, Kim Kyung Jin	
149	August 11, 2010	No Brain	
150	August 18, 2010	No Brain	
151	August 25, 2010	Jo Young-nam, DJ DOC	
152	September 1, 2010	Jo Young-nam, DJ DOC	
153	September 8, 2010	Jo Young-nam, DJ DOC	
154	September 15, 2010		
N/A	September 23, 2010	Super Junior (Leeteuk, Shindong, Sungmin, Eunhyuk, Donghae, Ryeowook, Kyuhyun)	Chuseok Special Super Show
156	September 29, 2010	Ahn Jung-hoon, Lee In-hye, Kim Min-hee	
157	October 6, 2010	Ahn Jung-hoon, Lee In-hye, Kim Min-hee	
158	October 13, 2010	Ahn Jung-hoon, Lee In-hye, Kim Min-hee	
159	October 20, 2010	Ok Taec-yeon (2PM), Jang Wooyoung (2PM), Min (Miss A), Jia (Miss A)	
160	October 27, 2010	Ok Taec-yeon (2PM), Jang Wooyoung (2PM), Min (Miss A), Jia (Miss A)	
161	November 3, 2010	Lee Juck, Psy	Heechul (Super Junior) filled in as MC.
161	November 10, 2010	Lee Juck, Psy	Heechul (Super Junior) filled in as MC.
162	November 17, 2010	Lee Juck, Psy	Heechul (Super Junior) filled in as MC.
163	November 24, 2010	Hahm Eun-jung (T-ara), Hyomin (T-ara), Park Ji-yeon (T-ara), Ryu Hyo-young (Coed School), Heo Chan-mi (Coed School)	
164	December 1, 2010	Hahm Eun-jung (T-ara), Hyomin (T-ara), Park Ji-yeon (T-ara), Ryu Hyo-young (Coed School), Heo Chan-mi (Coed School)	
165	December 8, 2010	Lisa Ha, Kang Susie	Heechul's (Super Junior) first episode as an MC
166	December 15, 2010	Lisa Ha, Kang Susie	
167	December 22, 2010	Shim Hyung-rae, Eom Yong-su, Kim Hak-rae	

== 2011 ==
List of episodes (2011)

Note: this list is missing some episodes.
Episode #	Broadcast Date	Guests	Notes
170	January 19, 2011	Lee Yoo-jin, Bang Eun-hee, Shoo	Parts 1 and 2
171	January 26, 2011	Lee Yoo-jin, Bang Eun-hee, Shoo	Parts 1 and 2
172	February 2, 2011	Kim Kap-soo, Gain, Jun Tae-soo, Jung Ho-bin	All My Love For You Special
173	February 9, 2011	Lee Yoo-jin, Bang Eun-hee	Part 3
177	March 9, 2011	Han Sun-hwa, Song Ji-eun, Hyolyn, Bora	
178	March 16, 2011	Han Sun-hwa, Song Ji-eun, Hyolyn, Bora	
179	March 23, 2011	Park Wan-kyu, Lee Jung, IU	
180	March 30, 2011	Park Wan-kyu, Lee Jung, IU	
181	April 6, 2011	Park Wan-kyu, Lee Jung, IU	
182	April 13, 2011	Kim Jong-min, Kim Hyung-jun, Hwang Kwanghee	
183	April 20, 2011	Kim Jong-min, Kim Hyung-jun, Hwang Kwanghee	
184	April 27, 2011	Maya, Wheesung, K.Will	
185	May 4, 2011	Maya, Wheesung, K.Will	
190	June 8, 2011	Lee Hyun-woo, Kim Dong-wan (Shinhwa), Jang Woo-hyuk	
191	June 15, 2011	Lee Hyun-woo, Kim Dong-wan (Shinhwa), Jang Woo-hyuk	
194	July 13, 2011	Beast	
195	July 20, 2011	Beast	
196	July 27, 2011	Baek Ji-young, Kim Yeon-woo, Ji Sang-ryeol	
197	August 3, 2011	Baek Ji-young, Kim Yeon-woo, Ji Sang-ryeol	
200	August 24, 2011	Jung Jae-hyung, Lee Juck, John Park	200th Episode Special
201	August 31, 2011	Jung Jae-hyung, Lee Juck, John Park	200th Episode Special
202	September 7, 2011	Jung Jae-hyung, Lee Juck, John Park	200th Episode Special
203	September 14, 2011	Boom, Suzy, Dynamic Duo (Choiza, Gaeko)	
204	September 28, 2011	Boom, Suzy, Dynamic Duo (Choiza, Gaeko)	
205	October 5, 2011	Boom, Suzy, Dynamic Duo (Choiza, Gaeko)	This is Heechul's (Super Junior) last episode before enlisting in the military. The October 12 episode was cancelled to give way to a special broadcast of The Knee-Drop Guru.
206	October 19, 2011	Kara	Kyuhyun (Super Junior) joins as the new MC starting from this episode
207	October 26, 2011	Kim Gun Mo, Kim Jo Han, Sung Si Kyung, Seo In Young	Soulful Singers Special
208	November 2, 2011	Park Myeong-su, Jeong Hyeong-don, Haha	Radiostar VS Infinite Challenge
209	November 9, 2011	Girls' Generation (Taeyeon, Jessica, Tiffany), Park Hae-mi, Im Tae-kyung	
210	November 16, 2011	Wonder Girls	Wonder Girls Comeback Special with guest appearance by Jo Kwon (2AM) and Min (Miss A)

== 2012 ==
List of episodes (2012)

Note: this list is missing some episodes.
Episode #	Broadcast Date	Guests	Notes
216	January 4, 2012	Yoo Nam-kyu, Woo Ji-won, Yang Joon-hyuk	Sports Legends Special
221	February 8, 2012	Ricky Kim, Sayuri, Julien Kang	
223	February 22, 2012	Uee (After School), Lee Joon (MBLAQ), Jay (TRAX), Yim Si-wan (ZE:A)	
224	February 29, 2011	Jeon Hye-bin, Chansung, Cho Young-goo, Joo Young-hoon	
225	March 7, 2012	2AM	2AM Comeback Special
227	March 21, 2012	Shinhwa	Shinhwa Special
228	March 28, 2012	Shinhwa / Choi Min-soo	
229	April 18, 2012	Choi Min-soo	
230	April 25, 2012	Jung Eun-pyo, Kim Eung-soo, Sunwoo Jae-duk	Moon Embracing the Sun Supporting Actors Special
231	May 2, 2012	Jung Eun-pyo, Kim Eung-soo, Sunwoo Jae-duk / Narsha, Lee Se-chang, Kim Hee-won	
232	May 9, 2012	Narsha, Lee Se-chang, Kim Hee-won	Lights and Shadows Supporting Actors
233	May 16, 2012	Seo In-guk, Huh Gak, Son Jin-young, Goo Ja Myung	Superstar K vs Birth of a Great Star
234	May 23, 2019	Seo In-guk, Huh Gak, Son Jin-young, Goo Ja Myung	Superstar K vs Birth of a Great Star
237	June 13, 2012	Kim Wan-sun, Bada, Hyolyn	
238	June 20, 2012	Park Mi-sun, Song Eun-i, Kim Sook (comedian), Kim Ji-hye	
239	June 27, 2012	Park Mi-sun, Song Eun-i, Kim Sook (comedian), Kim Ji-hye / Ahn Jae-wook, Ryu Dam, Jo Mi-ryung, Kim Hee-won	
240	July 4, 2012	Ahn Jae-wook, Ryu Dam, Jo Mi-ryung, Kim Hee-won	Real Lights and Shadows Special
241	July 11, 2012	Robert Holley, Victoria, Nichkhun	
243	July 25, 2012	Psy, Lena Park, Bobby Kim	
244	August 1, 2012	Nam Kyung-joo, Jung Sung-hwa, Lee Tae-ri, Lee Chang-min	Musical Actors Special
245	August 15, 2012	Nam Kyung-joo, Jung Sung-hwa, Lee Tae-ri, Lee Chang-min / Lee Hoon, Tony An, Song Chong-gug	
246	August 22, 2012	Lee Hoon, Tony An, Song Chong-gug	Dancing with the Stars 2 Special
247	August 29, 2012	Kim Jang-hoon, Seo Kyung-duk, Kim Jae-bum, Cho Jun-ho	
248	September 5, 2012	Super Junior (Siwon, Leeteuk, Shindong, Eunhyuk)	Super Junior's Comeback Special
249	September 12, 2012	Super Junior (Siwon, Leeteuk, Shindong, Eunhyuk)	Super Junior's Comeback Special
250	September 19, 2012	Ahn Nae-sang, Lee Moon-sik, Woo Hyun	
251	September 26, 2012	Kim Jung-nan, Lee Jong-hyun, Onew, Taemin	
252	October 3, 2012	Kim Seo-hyung, Ryu Seung-soo, Kim Byung-man, L (South Korean singer)	Mom is Acting Up Special
253	October 10, 2012	Park Ji-bin, Lee Se-young, Noh Young-hak, Oh Jae-moo	Child Star Special
254	October 17, 2012	Kim In-kwon, Kwon Hyun-sang, Jo Jung-suk	
255	October 24, 2012	Kim In-kwon, Kwon Hyun-sang, Jo Jung-suk / Lee Chang-Myung, Solbi, Defconn, Sangchu	
256	October 31, 2012	Lee Chang-myung, Solbi, Defconn, Sangchu	Due to schedule conflict, Shorry J will replace Lee Chang-myung for this episode
257	November 7, 2012	Yoon Se-ah, Oh Yeon-seo, Han Sun-hwa	We Got Married Season 4 Brides Special, guest appearance by Lee Joon
259	November 28, 2012	Bae Jong-ok, Cho Jae-hyun, Jung Woong-in	
260	December 12, 2012	Lee Sung-jae, Ryu Soo-young, Seo In-guk	The Sons Special
261	December 26, 2012	Kim Tae-won, Kim Yeon-woo, Kim So-hyun, Brave Brothers	Birth of a Great Star 3 Special

== 2013 ==
List of episodes (2013)

Episode #	Broadcast Date	Guests	Notes
309	January 2, 2013	Yum Kyung-hwan, Hong Seok-cheon, Sean Lee, Yoon Sung-ho	Part 1
310	January 9, 2013	Yum Kyung-hwan, Hong Seok-cheon, Sean Lee, Yoon Sung-ho	Part 2
311	January 16, 2013	Ko Chang-seok, Lee Jong-hyuk, Im Hyung-joon	
312	January 23, 2013	Girls' Generation (Yoona, Taeyeon, Tiffany, Hyoyeon, Sunny, Sooyoung, Yuri, Jessica, Seohyun)	
313	January 30, 2013	Park Hak-ki, Han Dong-joon, Hong Kyung-min, Jo Jung-chi	Kim Kwang-seok Special
314	February 6, 2013	Kang Ye-bin, Park Eun-ji, G.NA	
315	February 13, 2013	Choi Joon-yong, Kim Kwang-kyu, Jung Man-sik	
316	February 20, 2013	Wang Jong-geun, Yoon Young-mi, Kim Sung-kyung, Kim Kyung-ran	
317	February 27, 2013	Sam, Nancy Lang, Muzie, Kim Sung-kyu	Part 1
318	March 6, 2013	Sam, Nancy Lang, Muzie, Kim Sung-kyu; Danny Ahn (g.o.d), Chun Myung-hoon (NRG), Kim Jae-duck (Sechs Kies), Lee Jae-won (H.O.T.)	Part 2 First Generation of Idols Special: Part 1
319	March 13, 2013	Danny Ahn (g.o.d), Chun Myung-hoon (NRG), Kim Jae-duck (Sechs Kies), Lee Jae-won (H.O.T.)	First Generation of Idols Special: Part 2
320	March 20, 2013	Kim Ae-gyeong, Jo Min- ki, Kim Bo-sung, Jang Hyun-sung	
321	March 27, 2013	Clazziquai (Horan, Alex), Jung-in, Lee Jung	
322	April 3, 2013	Yoo Jun-sang, Oh Jong-hyuk, Ji Chang-wook, Lee Jeong-yeol	The Days Musical Special
323	April 10, 2013	Choi Hong-man, Kim Tae-woo, Kim Young-ho	Giants Special
324	April 17, 2013	Lee Moon-se, Yoon Do-hyun, Cultwo (Jung Chan-woo, Kim Tae-gyun)	
325	April 24, 2013	Kim Jung-hyun, Hong Kyung-in, Lee Min-woo	
326	May 1, 2013	Spring Summer Fall Winter, Vibe	Legendary Musical Duos Special
327	May 8, 2013	Shinhwa (Lee Min-woo, Jun Jin, Andy Lee, Eric Mun, Kim Dong-wan, Shin Hye-sung)	
328	May 15, 2013	2PM (Chansung, Nichkhun, Taecyeon, Wooyoung, Jun. K, Junho)	
329	May 22, 2013	Lee Hong-gi, Im Won-hee, Baek Jin-hee, Shim Yi-young	Rockin' on Heaven's Door Movie Special
330	May 9, 2013	Lee Hyori, Moon Hee-joon, Kim Jong-min	Leaders Special
331	June 5, 2013	Kim Jung-min, Kim Jung-min, Lee Ji-hoon, Lee Ji-hoon	
332	June 12, 2013	Hong Jin-Young, Park Wan-gyu, Shin Ji, Kim Shin-young	
333	June 19, 2013	Kim Jin-soo, Choi Song-hyun, After School (Lizzy, Nana)	
334	June 26, 2013	Park Myung-soo, Koo Joon-yeob, Kahi, Don Spike	
335	July 3, 2013	Kolleen Park, BMK, Kim Hyeong-seok, Ivy	
336	July 10, 2013	Shin Sung-woo, Jang Ho-il, Kang Sung-jin, Sungmin (Super Junior)	Jack the Ripper Musical Special
337	July 17, 2013	Kim Jun-hee, Ahn Sun-yeong, Jung Ju-ri, Jay Park	
338	July 24, 2013	Kim Heung-gook, Lee Joon, Sayuri, Clara	
339	July 31, 2013	Hong Ki-hoon, Park Nam-hyun, Yoo Tae-woong	
340	August 7, 2013	Lee Hyun-do, Verbal Jint, Muzie, Ha Ha, Skull	
341	August 21, 2013	f(x) (Sulli, Krystal) Defconn, Kim Kyung-min	
342	August 28, 2013	Choo Sung-hoon, Kim Dong-hyun, Bae Myung-ho, Shin So-yul	
343	September 4, 2013	Park Jin-young, KARA (Seungyeon, Hara, Jiyoung)	
344	September 11, 2013	Sumi Jo, Kangta, JK Kim Dong-wook, G.O (MBLAQ)	
345	September 18, 2013	Kim Min-jong, Park Hyung-sik (ZE:A), Key (SHINee), Dana	Bonnie and Clyde Musical Special
346	September 25, 2013	Shin Bong-seon, Jang Dong-min, Christina, Song Ho-joon	
347	October 2, 2013	Kim Hae-sook, Kim Jung-tae, Kim Sung-oh, Lee Si-eon	Tough as Iron Movie Special
348	October 9, 2013	Kim Soo-yong, Lim Kim, Bong Man-dae, Ryeowook (Super Junior)	
349	October 16, 2013	Jun Hyun-moo, Jung Kyung-ho, John Park	
350	October 23, 2013	Park Ji-yoon, Seo In-young, Lady Jane, RiSe (Ladies' Code)	
351	October 30, 2013	Yang Dong-geun, Lee Tae-im, Yuk Joong-wan (Rose Motel), Jung Joon-young	
352	November 6, 2013	Kim Soo-ro, Kan Mi-youn, Shim Eun-jin, Lim Jeong-hee	
353	November 13, 2013	Im Chang-jung, Jung Sung-hwa, Choi Hyun-woo, Maeng Seung-ji	
354	November 20, 2013	Lee Bong-won, Kim Shin-young, K.Will, Han Jae-kwon	
355	November 27, 2013	Jung Joon, Kim Yoo-mi, Jo Se-ho, Navi	
356	December 4, 2013	Choi Min-soo, Hyolyn (SISTAR), Sandeul (B1A4), Sleepy (Untouchable)	
357	December 11, 2013	Yoon Do-hyun, Lena Park, Bobby Kim, Yiruma	
358	December 18, 2013	Jang Jin, Park Gun-hyung, Kim Seul-gi, Kim Yeon-woo	December Movie Special
359	December 25, 2013	Yoon Sung-ho, Jo Se-ho, Hong Jin-young, Jay Park, Sleepy (Untouchable)	

== 2014 ==
List of episodes (2014)

Note: This list's episode numbers are inaccurate.
Episode #	Broadcast Date	Guests	Notes
360	January 1, 2014	Kim Sung-joo, Robert Holley, Kim Kyung-ho, Soo Bin	2014 New Year's Day Special.
361	January 8, 2014	Lee Yeon-hee, Lee Ki-woo, Seung-jae, Kim Ye-won	
362	January 15, 2014	Shin-Soo Choo	
363	January 22, 2014	Shin-Soo Choo	
364	January 29, 2014	Son Ho-jun, Baro, Park Ki-woong, No Min-woo, Seo Kang-joon	2014 (Lunar) New Year's Day Special. First recording at the new building in Sangam-dong, and first public broadcasting since the launch of the program.
365	February 5, 2014	Lee Byung-joon, Ra Mi-ran, Kim Ki-bang, Choi Woo-shik	
366	February 26, 2014	Gain, Yoon Hyeong-bin, Hong Jin-kyung, Lee Min-woo, Park Hwi-soon	
367	March 5, 2014	CNBLUE	CNBLUE's comeback special.
368	March 12, 2014	Girls' Generation (Taeyeon, Tiffany, Jessica, Sunny, Yuri)	Girls' Generation comeback special.
369	March 19, 2014	Heo Ji-ung, Hong Jin-ho, Simon Dominic, Zico (Block B)	
370	March 26, 2014	Namkoong Min, Hong Jin-young, Jung Joon-young, Park Se-young, Jang Wooyoung	We Got Married Season 4 special.
371	April 2, 2014	Lee Seung-hwan, Lyn, HUE, Junil Jung	
372	April 9, 2014	Kim Eung-soo, Song Eun-i, Yoon Ki-won, Kim Young-chul	
373	April 30, 2014	Seo Jang-hoon, Kim Min-jong, Jun Hyun-moo, Soyou	
374	May 7, 2014	Song Seung-heon, Cho Yeo-jeong, On Joo-wan, Kim Dae-woo	Obsessed special.
375	May 14, 2014	Kim Sung-joo, Song Chong-gug, Ahn Jung-hwan, Seo Hyeong-wook	Brazil World Cup D-30 special.
376	May 21, 2014	Bae Cheol-soo, Younha, Kim Hyeon-cheol, Park Joon-hyung	MBC Radio DJ special.
377	May 28, 2014	Jang Su-won, Kang Min-kyung, Lizzy, Park Dong-bin	
378	June 11, 2014	Kang Sue-jin, Baek Ji-young, Kim Sung-ryung	
379	June 18, 2014	Sim Hyeon-seob, Kim Ji-hoon, Lee Jung, Park Hyun-bin	
382	June 25, 2014	MC Gree, Kwak Dong-yeon, Kim You-jung, Noh Tae-yeop	
383	July 2, 2014	Park Sang-min, San E, Han Jung-soo, Im Dae-ho	
384	July 9, 2014	Lee Sang-bong, Bang Si-hyuk, Choi Yeo-jin, Sam Okyere	
385	July 16, 2014	Lee Dong-jun, Raymon Kim, Lee Jae-yoon, Swings	
386	July 23, 2014	Song Chang-eui, Jo Jung-suk, Oh Jong-hyuk, Jang Seung-jo	Blood Brothers musical special.
387	July 30, 2014	Jo Kwan-woo, Kim Ga-yeon, Yoo Sang-moo, Kim Da-som (Sistar)	
388	August 6, 2014	Son Byong-ho, Yeon Woo-jin, Jeong Yu-mi, Min Do-hee	The Tunnel special.
389	August 13, 2014	Kim Soo-ro, Kang Sung-jin, Im Hyung-joon, Kim Min-kyo	
390	August 20, 2014	Lee Byung-jin, Jang Dong-hyuk (comedian), Kim Tae-hyun, Sayuri Fujita	
391	August 27, 2014	Lee Kye-in, Yoo Jung-hyun, Hwang Hyun-hee, DinDin	
392	September 3, 2014	Shin Hae-chul, Noh Yoo-min, Yoon Min-soo	
393	September 10, 2014	Won Ki-joon, Go Se-won, Lee Kyu-han, Oh Chang-seok	Chuseok special.
394	September 17, 2014	Kim Jong-min, Shin Bong-sun, Rhymer (musician)	
395	September 24, 2014	Cha Tae-hyun, Kim Kang-hyun, Kim Young-tak (director)	Slow Video special.
396	October 1, 2014	Sul Woon-du and his son Lumin (singer), Jang Kwang-soon and his son Jang Dong-min	Father-son special
397	October 8, 2014	Super Junior (Choi Si-won, Leeteuk, Kangin, Eunhyuk)	Super Junior's Comeback Special
398	October 15, 2014	Hyun Jin-young, Kim Ji-hyun, Kim Hyun-wook, Sung Dae-hyun	
399	October 22, 2014	Joon Park (g.o.d), Song Kyung-ah, Mino (Free Style), Son Dong-woon (Beast)	
400	October 29, 2014	Kim Kwang-min, Jang Ki-ho, Jo Kyu-chan, Park Won (One More Chance)	Yoo Jae-ha special.
401	November 5, 2014	Shin Soo-ji, Park Ji-eun, Song Ga-yeon, Seo Hee-joo	
402	November 12, 2014	Kim Roi-ha, Lee Chae-young, Kim Won-hae, Lee Chul-min	
403	November 19, 2014	Kim Bum-soo, Park Ju-won, Chang Kiha, Yohei Hasegawa	
404	November 26, 2014	Oh Man-seok, Ko Chang-seok, Jung Sun-ah, Han Sun-chun	Kinky Boots special.
405	December 3, 2014	Cho Jae-hyun, Lee Kwang-ki, Im Ho, Hwang Young-hee	
406	December 10, 2014	Kangnam (M.I.B), Lee Hye-ri (Girl's Day), Choi Tae-joon, Yoo Byung-jae	
407	December 17, 2014	Yoon Hyun-min, Bada (S.E.S.), Baro (B1A4), Jackson Wang (Got7)	
408	December 24, 2014	Joon Park (g.o.d), Seo Jang-hoon, Choi Yeo-jin, Lee Kyu-han	

== 2015 ==
List of episodes (2015)

Episode #	Broadcast Date	Guests	Notes
409	January 7, 2015	Lee Dae-ho, Oh Seung-hwan, Jeong Jun-ha	
410	January 14, 2015	Lee Dae-ho, Oh Seung-hwan, Jeong Jun-ha	
411	January 21, 2015	Yoo Jun-sang, Um Ki-joon, Lee Gun-myung	
412	January 28, 2015	Kim Sung-soo, Kim Gun-mo, Lee Bon, Kim Hyun-jung	Infinite Challenge Saturday, Saturday's: I Am A Singer special.
413	February 4, 2015	Han Seong-ho (founder, FNC Entertainment), Park Gwang-hyun, Jung Yong-hwa (CNBLUE), Sung Hyuk	FNC Entertainment special.
414	February 11, 2015	Kim Seung-soo, Jo Dong-hyuk, Junggigo, Kang Kyun-sung (Noel)	Valentine's Day special.
415	February 18, 2015	Park Tam-hee, Shim Yi-young, Jang Youngran, Jung Kyung-mi	Korean New Year special.
416	February 25, 2015	Seo Tae-hwa, Choi Hyun-seok, Brian Joo, Maeng Ki-yong	
417	March 4, 2015	Amber (f(x)), Kim Min-soo, Jang Do-yeon, Song Jong-hak	
418	March 11, 2015	Lee Chang-hoon, Lee Hyun-woo, Hyun Woo, Eddy Kim	
419	March 18, 2015	Kim Ji-young, Kang Ye-won, Park Ha-sun, Ahn Young-mi	Real Men 2 special.
420	March 25, 2015	Choi Jung-won, Ryu Jae-hyun, Kim Jae-duc (Sechs Kies), Shorry J	
421	April 1, 2015	Lee Hyun-do, Cho PD, Lee Hong-gi (F.T. Island), Kim Poong	
422	April 8, 2015	Lee Jae-hoon, Lee Jung, Bang Eun-hee, Kim Sook	
423	April 15, 2015	Kim Heung-gook, Kim Bu-seon, Lee Hoon, Hwang Kwanghee	
424	April 22, 2015	Im Won-hee, Jung Gyu-woon, Kim Young-chul, Sam Kim	Real Men 2 special.
425	April 29, 2015	Kim Eung-soo, Shin Jung-geun, Park Eun-hye, Jin Se-yeon	Enemies In-Law special.
426	May 6, 2015	Jung Woong-in, Jang Hyun-sung, Choi Won-young, Seo Hyun-chul	
427	May 13, 2015	Kim Dong-wan (Shinhwa), Yuk Jung-wan (Rose Motel), Kangnam (M.I.B), Hwang Seok-jeong	I Live Alone special.
428	May 20, 2015	Kang Susie, Im Soo-hyang, Kim Sae-rom, Park Choa (AOA)	
429	May 27, 2015	Kim Sung-joo, Kim Hyung-suk, Kahi (After School, Luna (f(x)), Yook Sungjae (BtoB)	King of Mask Singer special.
430	June 3, 2015	Lee Seung-chul, Jung Yup, Gummy, Kim Sung-kyu	
431	June 10, 2015	Ock Joo-hyun, Lee Ji-hoon, Shin Sung-rok, Kim Soo-yong	The musical Elisabeth special.
432	June 17, 2015	Jeong Bo-seok, Shim Hyun-sub, Lee Hyung-chul, Jang Won-young	
433	June 24, 2015	Jun Hyo-seong, Soyou (Sistar), Ye Jung-hwa, Kim Yeon-jung	
434	July 1, 2015	Yoon Park, Jeon So-min, Sleepy, Jung Sang-hoon	
435	July 8, 2015	Park Hyo-joo, Jang So-yeon (actress), Ha Jae-sook, Lee Mi-do	
436	July 15, 2015	Super Junior (Leeteuk, Kim Hee-chul, Choi Si-won, Eunhyuk, Donghae, Yesung)	Super Junior's comeback special & 10th anniversary
437	July 22, 2015	Hong Seok-cheon, Lee Guk-joo, Shin Ji-min (AOA), Joo-heon (Monsta X)	
438	July 29, 2015	Jeong Chang-wook, Huh Gak, Kang Ye-bin (actress), Bae Soo-jung	
439	August 5, 2015	Shoo, Hwang Hye-young, Lee Ji-hyun, Jadu	
440	August 12, 2015	Yoo Sun, Cha Ye-ryun, Kim Sung-kyun, Kim Hye-seong	Cast of the film 'The Chosen: Forbidden Cave'
441	August 19, 2015	Park Ji-yoon, Joo Young-hoon, Seohyun (Girls' Generation), Shim Hyung-tak	
442	August 26, 2015	Jo Young-nam, Yoon Hyung-joo, Kim Se-hwan, Jo Jung-min	
443	September 2, 2015	Im Chang-jung, Jun Jin (Shinhwa), Zion.T, Hwang Chi-yeul	
444	September 9, 2015	Oh Jeong-yeon, Stephanie, Go Woo-ri (Rainbow), Oh Na-mi	
445	September 16, 2015	Kim Jang-hoon, Jung Kyung-ho, Kim Yong-jun, Park Hwi-soon	
446	September 23, 2015	Oh Se-deuk (chef), Yoon Jung-soo, Park Na-rae, Yoo Jae-hwan	
447	September 30, 2015	Park Kyung-lim, Jin Yi-han, Kang Seul-gi (Red Velvet), Gray	
448	October 7, 2015	Park Hyuk-kwon, Lee Byeong-heon, Park Byung-eun, Jo Dal-hwan	
449	October 14, 2015	Hwang Jae-geun, Victoria Song, Lee Tae-ri, Kim Hee-jung	
450	October 21, 2015	Roy Kim, Shin A-young, Jo Seung-yeon, Kim So-jung	
451	October 28, 2015	Shin Seung-hun, Lee Hyun-woo, K.Will, Yuju	
452	November 4, 2015	Kim Beop-rae, Cha Sun-bae, Choi Byung-mo, Kim Jae-hwa	
453	November 11, 2015	Jung Joon-ho, Moon Jeong-hee, Bang Min-ah, Lee Minhyuk(BtoB)	Sweet, Savage Family special
454	November 18, 2015	Kim Sang-hyuk, Shim Mina, Lee Sang-hoon (comedian), Lee Min-woong	
455	November 25, 2015	Narsha, Park Jun-Myun, Hong Yoon-hwa, Hwang Mi-young	
456	December 2, 2015	Hwang Seok-jeong, Kim Yeon-woo, Kim Young-chul, Park Seul-gi, Kim Min-jae	MBC 54th anniversary special.
457	December 9, 2015	Kwon Oh-joong, Kim Jung-min, Son Jun-ho, Cho Yeon-woo	
458	December 16, 2015	Lena Park, Jessi, Jackson Wang (Got7), Cao Lu (Fiestar)	
459	December 23, 2015	Seo Jang-hoon, Lee Ha-nui, Lee Guk-joo, Sam Kim	Christmas Special

== 2016 ==
List of episodes (2016)

Episode #	Broadcast Date	Guests	Notes
460	January 6, 2016	Kim Seung-woo, Lee Tae-sung, Oh Man-seok, Kim Jung-tae	Why Did You Come to Our House special
461	January 13, 2016	Kim Sook, Hani (EXID), Kwak Si-yang, Hwang Je-seong	Heart Stealer special
462	January 20, 2016	Park So-dam, Lee Hae-young, Lee El, Jo Se-ho	
463	January 27, 2016	Ryeowook (Super Junior), Henry Lau (Super Junior-M), Jung Joon-young, Zico (Block B)	Stone (dol) + Idol special
464	February 3, 2016	Park Na-rae, Yang Se-chan, Jang Do-yeon, Yang Se-hyung	
465	February 10, 2016	Park Na-rae, Yang Se-chan, Jang Do-yeon, Yang Se-hyung	
466	February 17, 2016	Kang Ha-neul, Kim Shin-young, Kim Dong-hyun, Han Jae-young	
467	February 24, 2016	Ji Suk-jin, Choi Seung-gook, Chen (EXO), Kim Eun-seong	
468	March 2, 2016	Lee Se-young, Lee Yi-kyung, Dong Hyun-bae, Nayeon (Twice)	
469	March 9, 2016	Woo Hyeon, Kim Tae Jin, Hwang Eui Jun, Kim Sung-eun, Nana (After School)	Face Wars special
470	March 16, 2016	Yoo Yeol, Jung Won-kwan, In Gyo-jin, Lee Yoon-suk	
471	March 23, 2016	Lee Sung-kyung, Tae Hang-ho, Defconn, Heo Kyung-hwan	
472	March 30, 2016	Namkoong Min, Lee Dong-hwi, Seolhyun (AOA), Yoon Jung-soo	You're the Best special
473	April 6, 2016	Navi, Jang Dong-min, Yoo Se-yoon, Yoo Sang-moo	
474	April 20, 2016	Tak Jae-hoon, Kim Heung-gook, Lee Chun-soo, Kim Him-chan (B.A.P)	
475	April 27, 2016	Cha Tae-hyun, Bae Seong-woo, Victoria (f(x)), Choi Jin-ho	
476	May 4, 2016	Lee Seung-chul, Kangin (Super Junior), Brave Brothers, Dana	
477	May 11, 2016	Park Jin-young, Min Hyo-rin, G.Soul, Jo Kwon (2AM)	JYP Entertainment special
478	May 18, 2016	Parc Jae-jung (Superstar K5), Hwang Chi-yeul, Lee Hyun-jae, Kim Min-suk	
479	May 25, 2016	Ha Seok-jin, Kim Ji-seok, Han Hye-jeon & Han Hye-jin	
480	June 1, 2016	Eun Ji-won, Lee Jae-jin, Kim Jae-duc, Kang Sung-hoon, Jang Su-won	Sechs Kies special
481	June 8, 2016	Seo Kang-joon & Kang Tae-oh (5urprise), Kang Kyun-sung & Jeon Woo-sung (Noel)	
482	June 15, 2016	Gree, Shin Dong-woo, Lee Soo-min, Shannon Williams, Im Da-young (Cosmic Girls)	
483	June 22, 2016	Ha Hyun-woo (Guckkasten), Tei, Hyolyn (Sistar), Han Dong-geun	King of Mask Singer special
484	June 29, 2016	Lee Yoon-seok, Han Cheol-woo, Lee Kyung-kyu, Yoo Jae-hwan, Yoon Hyung-bin	
485	July 6, 2016	Lee Yoon-seok, Han Cheol-woo, Lee Kyung-kyu, Yoo Jae-hwan, Yoon Hyung-bin	
486	July 13, 2016	Dok2, Kim Bo-sung, Shin Dong-ho, Joo Woo-jae	Turn Up special
487	July 20, 2016	Jeong Jinwoon, Jo Hyun-ah (Urban Zakapa), Kian84, Park Tae-joon	Crazy Friends special
488	July 27, 2016	Kangta (H.O.T.), Lee Jin-ho, Yang Se-chan, Lee Yong-jin	
489	August 3, 2016	Lee Sang-min, Sol Bi, Kyungri (Nine Muses), Kwon Hyuk-soo	Sweet and Salty special
490	August 24, 2016	Kim Soo-ro, Kim Min-jong, Lee Han-wi, Lee Dong Ha, YooA (Oh My Girl)	
491	August 31, 2016	Simon Dominic, Gray, Zico (Block B), Lee Sun-bin	
492	September 7, 2016	Jung Hae-kyun, Choi Gwi-hwa, Oh Dae-hwan, Lee Si-eon	Supporting actors special Yang Se-hyung filled in as MC for Cho Kyuhyun, who took a break to get treatment for vocal fold nodules.
493	September 14, 2016	Kim Jun-hyun, Moon Se-yoon, Yoo Min-sang, Kim Min-kyung, Lee Soo-ji	
494	September 21, 2016	Cho Jae-hyun, Park Hyuk-kwon, Park Chul-min, Lee Joon-hyuk	Son Dong-woon (Beast) filled in as MC for Cho Kyuhyun, who took a break to get treatment for vocal fold nodules.
495	September 28, 2016	Gain, Seo In-young, Hwayobi, Solar (Mamamoo)	Girl Crush special Yook Sungjae (BtoB) filled in as MC for Cho Kyuhyun, who took a break to get treatment for vocal fold nodules.
496	October 5, 2016	Kim Dae-hee, Park Kyung (Block B), Kim Joon-ho, Kisum	Comedians special
497	October 19, 2016	Kang Susie, Kim Wan-sun, Park Soo-hong, Kim Soo-yong	Flaming Youth special
498	October 26, 2016	Kang Susie, Kim Wan-sun, Park Soo-hong, Kim Soo-yong	Flaming Youth special
499	November 2, 2016	Joon Park, Jay Park, Lee Guk-joo, Sleepy (Untouchable)	
500	November 9, 2016	Kim Hee-chul (Super Junior), Lee Soo-geun, Yoo Se-yoon, Woo Seung-min, Han Dong-geun	500th Episode Special
501	November 16, 2016	Shim Hyung-tak, Song Jae-hee, Jeongyeon and Sana (Twice), Lee Sang-joon	
502	November 23, 2016	Kim Hyun-wook, Lee Ji-yeon, Han Suk-joon, Jo Woo-jong	Freelance announcers
503	November 30, 2016	Kang Sung-hoon, Eun Ji-won, Lee Jae-jin, Kim Jae-duk, Jang Su-won	Sechs Kies special
504	December 7, 2016	Seo Ji-hye, Tony An & Moon Hee-joon (H.O.T.), Seo Yu-ri, Irene (Red Velvet)	
505	December 14, 2016	Kim Jaewon, Lee Soo-kyung (actress, born 1982), Kim Sun-young, Hwang Dong-joo	
506	December 21, 2016	G-Dragon, Taeyang, T.O.P, Seungri, Daesung	Big Bang special
507	December 28, 2016	G-Dragon, Taeyang, T.O.P, Seungri, Daesung	Big Bang special

== 2017 ==
List of episodes (2017)

Episode #	Broadcast Date	Guests	Notes
508	January 4, 2017	Lee Soon-jae, Choi Min-yong, Shin Ji, Kim Hye-seong	
509	January 11, 2017	DinDin, Jisoo & Rosé (Blackpink), Bewhy, Zizo	
510	January 18, 2017	Ahn Jae-wook, Jung Sung-hwa, Lee Ji-hoon, Yang Jun-mo	
511	January 25, 2017	Park Wan-kyu, Jung Dong-ha, Lee Jae-yoon, Kangnam, Heyne	
512	February 1, 2017	Choi Eun-kyung, Kim Na-young, Hwangbo, Ye Jung-hwa, Kim Jung-min	
513	February 8, 2017	Seo Hyun-cheol, Jang Hyuk-jin, Min Jin-woong, Park Kyung-hye	
514	February 15, 2017	Kang Hyung-wook, Shindong (Super Junior), Shorry, Nam Sang-il	
515	February 22, 2017	Kim Jeong-hoon, Seo Kyung-seok, Kang Sung-tae, Shim So-young	
516	March 1, 2017	Kang Ye-won, Han Chae-ah, Sung Hyuk, Kim Ki-doo	
517	March 8, 2017	Nam Hee-suk, Ji Sang-ryeol, Jo Se-ho, Nam Chang-hee	
518	March 15, 2017	Yang Hee-eun, Yang Hee-kyung, Akdong Musician	
519	March 22, 2017	Choo Sung-hoon, Hwang Kwanghee, Lee Ji-hye, Jeong Da-rae	
520	March 29, 2017	Seo Jang-hoon, Park Joong-hoon, Kim Heung-gook, Bae Soon-tak	
521	April 5, 2017	Jang Yun-jeong, Hong Jin-young, Shin Young-il, Oh Sang-jin	
522	April 12, 2017	Han Eun-jung, Shim Jin-hwa, Song Min-ho, Seenroot	
523	April 19, 2017	Oh Yoon-ah, Kim Jung-tae, Kim Joon-bae, Lee Jun-ho (2PM)	
524	April 26, 2017	Kim Hye-eun, Kim Sung-kyun, Jo Woo-jin, Bae Jung-nam	
525	May 3, 2017	Lee Tae-gon, Soyou (Sistar), Rado (Black Eyed Pilseung), Park Sung-kwang	
526	May 10, 2017	Lee Jong-hyuk, Won Ki-joon, Shin Da-eun, Kim Kwang-sik	
527	May 17, 2017	Psy, Kim Bum-soo, Zion.T	Kang Seung-yoon (Winner) filled in as MC for Cho Kyuhyun, who was abroad filming New Journey to the West 4.
528	May 24, 2017	Choi Dae-chul, Shin Dong-wook, Heo Kyung-hwan, Yesung (Super Junior)	
529	May 31, 2017	Park So-hyun, Kim Joon-ho, Kim Jong-min, Haha	Cho Kyuhyun left the show due to his mandatory military service.
530	June 7, 2017	Bae Cheol-soo, Im Jin-mo, Kim Shin-young, Moon Chun-sik	Seo Jang-hoon filled in as MC.
531	June 14, 2017	Yoon Min-soo, Lee Seok-hoon, John Park, Go Jae-geun	Jung Joon-young filled in as MC.
532	June 21, 2017	Lee So-ra, Song Kyung-ah, Han Hye-jin, Yura (Girl's Day)	Kim Sung-kyu (Infinite) filled in as MC.
533	June 28, 2017	Joon Park & Kim Tae-woo (g.o.d), Song Baek-kyoung (1TYM), Jun Jin (Shinhwa)	Key (Shinee) filled in as MC.
534	July 5, 2017	Lee Hyori, Chae Ri-na, Kahi, Narsha (Brown Eyed Girls)	Hwang Chi-yeul filled in as MC.
535	July 12, 2017	Choi Min-soo, Jasper Cho, Lee So-yeon, Hwang Seung-eon	Lee Hong-gi (F.T. Island) filled in as MC.
536	July 19, 2017	Jang Hee-jin, Choi Yeo-jin, Son Yeo-eun, Park Jin-joo	Jun Jin (Shinhwa) filled in as MC.
537	July 26, 2017	Park Hae-mi, Jeong Jun-ha, Seo Min-jung	Eunhyuk (Super Junior) filled in as MC.
538	August 2, 2017	Kang Ha-neul, Dong Ha, Min Kyung-hoon, Jung Yong-hwa (CNBLUE)	Sol Bi filled in as MC.
539	August 9, 2017	Kim Jong-kook & Kim Jung-nam (Turbo), Hwang Chan-sung (2PM), Kim Jin-woo (Winner)	Kangnam filled in as MC.
540	August 16, 2017	Yoo Jun-sang, Ivy, Cha Ji-yeon, Park Eun-tae	Jung Jin-young (B1A4) filled in as MC.
541	August 23, 2017	Baek Ji-young, Yuri, Tak Jae-hoon, Muzie	Yoo Byung-jae filled in as MC.
542	August 30, 2017	Jo Min-ki, Son Mi-na, Kim Eung-soo, Kim Saeng-min	Kim Ji-hoon filled in as MC.
543	November 15, 2017	Kim Byung-se, Kim Seung-soo, Kim Il-woo, Yang Ik-june	Song Min-ho (Winner) filled in as MC.
544	November 22, 2017	Kim Bu-seon, Sayuri, Kang Kyun-sung, Jo Young-gu	Cha Tae-hyun filled in as MC.
545	November 29, 2017	Kim Yong-man, Hong Soo-ah, Chun Myung-hoon, Kim Kyung-min	Eun Ji-won (Sechs Kies) filled in as MC.
546	December 6, 2017	Shin Sung-rok, Son Dong-woon, Lee Ho-won, Kang Hong-seok	John Park filled in as MC.
547	December 13, 2017	Soyou, Eric Nam, Kim Dong-jun, Kim Ho-young	Yang Se-chan filled in as MC.
548	December 20, 2017	Lee Juck, Park Won, Lee Moon-se, Zion.T	DinDin filled in as MC.
549	December 27, 2017	Kim Soo-yong, JooE (Momoland), Han Hyun-min, Kwon Hyun-bin (JBJ), Hong Seok-cheon	Cha Tae-hyun filled in as MC.

== 2018 ==
List of episodes (2018)

Episode #	Broadcast Date	Guests	Notes
550	January 3, 2018	Lee Yoon-ji, Jung Si-ah, Kim Ji-woo, Jung Joo-ri	Cha Tae-hyun joins the show as a permanent host.
551	January 10, 2018	Kim Il-jung, Seo Ji-seok, Choi Chang-min, Kim Ji-min	
552	January 17, 2018	Kim Heung-gook, Kim Eana, Ko Jang-hwan, Park Won-soon	
553	January 24, 2018	Jo Kwon (2AM), Jang Wooyoung (2PM), Jackson Wang (GOT7), Kim Sung-kyu (Infinite)	
554	January 31, 2018	Park Joon-hyung, Kim Ji-hye, Hong Yoon-hwa, Kim Min-ki	
555	February 7, 2018	Oh Ji-ho, Kim Byeong-ok, Bae Ki-sung, Do Ji-han	
556	February 21, 2018	Lee Gi-kwang, Park Sung-kwang, San E, Bobby (iKON)	
557	February 28, 2018	Yang Dong-geun, No Hee-ji, Heo Jung-min, Seo Shin-ae	
558	March 7, 2018	Sam, N (VIXX), Sam Kim, Sam Okyere	
559	March 14, 2018	Lee Sang-hwa, Kwak Yoon-gy, Lee Seung-hoon, Lim Hyo-jun	Pyeongchang 2018 Olympic Winter Games Special
560	March 21, 2018	Seungri (Big Bang), Wanna One (Kang Daniel, Ong Seong-woo, Park Woo-jin)	
561	March 28, 2018	Noh Sa-yeon, Bada, Choi Jung-in, JeA	
562	April 4, 2018	Don Spike, Sleepy, Loco, Joo Woo-jae	
563	April 11, 2018	Lee Hye-jung, Hong Jin-ho, Shin Soo-ji, Risabae	
564	April 18, 2018	Yoon Mi-rae, Tiger JK, Yong Jun-hyung (Highlight), Kwon Jung-yeol (10cm)	
565	May 2, 2018	Kwon Yul, Han Ye-ri, Choi Won-young, Ko Sung-hee	
566	May 9, 2018	Lee Hwi-jae, Kim In-suk, Kim Jun-ho, Byun Gi-soo	
567	May 16, 2018	Lee Kye-in, Go Doo-shim, Brian Joo, Cha Eun-woo (ASTRO)	
568	May 23, 2018	Kim Sung-ryung, Lee Sang-min, Lee Jung-jin, Microdot	
569	May 30, 2018	SHINee	
570	June 6, 2018	Ahn Jung-hwan, Seo Hyung-wook, Kim Jung-geun, GAMST	
571	June 20, 2018	Ji Suk-jin, Kim Je-dong, Yang Yo-seob (Highlight), Jung Seung-hwan	
572	July 4, 2018	Lee Hye-young, Hong Ji-min, Lee Seung-hoon (Winner), Jeon Jun-young	
573	July 11, 2018	Jo Hyeon-woo, Lee Yong, Kim Young-gwon, Lee Seung-woo	2018 FIFA World Cup Special
574	July 18, 2018	Yoon Sang, Kim Tae-won (Boohwal), Zico (Block B), Jo Hyun-ah (Urban Zakapa)	
575	July 25, 2018	Choi Soo-jong, Lee Jae-ryong, James Moosong Lee, Hong Seo-beom	
576	August 1, 2018	Kim Jong-min, Koo Jun Yup, Son Na-eun (Apink), Kim Jeong Hoon	
577	August 8, 2018	Lee Yoo-ri, Song Chang-eui, Kim Young-min, Ahn Bo-hyun	
578	August 15, 2018	Kim Wan-sun, Lee Kwang-gi, Bae Yoon-jeong, Joo Ho-min	
579	August 22, 2018	Jay Park, Chan Sung Jung, Kwon Hyuk-soo, Yang Chi Seung	
580	August 29, 2018	Bae Doona, Lee Ki-chan, Soo Joo Park, Stephanie Lee	
581	September 5, 2018	Im Chae-moo, Yoon Jung-soo, Steve Kim Do-Kyoon, Lee Seung-yoon	
582	September 12, 2018	Zo In-sung, Bae Seong-woo, Park Byung-eun, Nam Joo-hyuk	
583	September 19, 2018	Zo In-sung, Bae Seong-woo, Park Byung-eun, Nam Joo-hyuk	
584	September 26, 2018	Jang Hyuk, Son Yeo-eun, Kim Jae-kyung, Choi Ki-seop, Ha Jun	
585	October 3, 2018	Wheesung, Simon Dominic, Woo Won-jae, Lee Yong-jin	
586	October 10, 2018	Lee Hwi-hyang, Ahn Jae-mo, Kang Se-jung, Sung Hyuk	
587	October 17, 2018	Jun Hyun-moo, Lee Pil-mo, Ha Seok-jin, JK Kim Dong-wook	
588	October 24, 2018	Johan Kim, Jung Eun-ji, Lee Hyun, Zo Bin	
589	October 31, 2018	Bae Jong-ok, Kim Jung-nan, Jessi, Crush	
590	November 7, 2018	Boom, Lee Sang-byuk, Oh Young-sil, Heo Cham	
591	November 14, 2018	Im Hyung-joon, Mad Clown, Choe Hyeon-u, Han Mu	
592	November 21, 2018	Park Gwang-hyun, Kim Hak-do, Kim Hyun-chul, Heo Kyung-hwan	
593	November 28, 2018	So Yoo-jin, Sim Jinhwa, Hong Kyung-min, Kim Poong	
594	December 5, 2018	Chang Kiha, Ji Sang-ryeol, Nucksal, Kim Jung Hyun	
595	December 11, 2018	Jang Yoon-ju, Hong Jin-young, DinDin, Kim Won-jung	
596	December 19, 2018	Lee Hyun-woo, Leeteuk (Super Junior), Kim Kyung-sik, Yoon Taek	
597	December 26, 2018	Jung Joon-young, Haon, Kwanghee, Seungkwan (Seventeen)	

== 2019 ==
List of episodes (2019)

Episode #	Broadcast Date	Guests	Notes
598	January 2	Pak Se-ri, Lee Dae-hoon, Lee Bong-ju, Lee Jong-beom	
599	January 9	Kim In-kwon, Kim Ki-bang, Gaeko, Mithra Jin	
600	January 16	Han Eun-jung, Lee Tae-ri, P.O (Block B), Yook Joong-wan	
601	January 23	Yunho (TVXQ), Hwang Chi-yeul, Park Ji-heon, Kim Won-hyo	
602	January 30	Hwasa (Mamamoo), Luna (f(x)), Hyolyn, Oh Jeong-yeon	
603	February 6	Lee Beom-soo, Rain, Lee Si-eon, Shin Soo-hang	Ji Sang-ryeol filled in as MC.
604	February 13	Shin Sung-woo, Um Ki-joon, Kang Sung-jin, Lee Gun-myung	
605	February 20	Lee Deok-hwa, Kang Min-kyung, Kang Yoo-mi, Yoo Min-sang	
606	February 27	Shim Hyung-tak, Yoon Min-soo, Kim Dong-hyun, Sandeul	
607	March 6	Song Jae-rim, Lee Joo-yeon, Kwak Dong-yeon, Ahn Woo-yeon	
608	March 13	Kim Jong-Kook, Shorry J (Mighty Mouth), Yoo Se-yoon, Lee Yi-kyung	
609	March 20	Sul Woon Do, Jang Beom-june, Shim Ji-ho, Ko Young-bae (Soran)	Cha Tae-hyun's last episode as permanent host.
610	March 27	Lee Soo-young, Chae Yeon, Bae Seul-ki, Kim Sang-hyuk	
611	April 3	Park Soo-hong, Son Hun-Su, Hong Seok-cheon, Wax	Kim Young-chul filled in as MC.
612	April 10	Yeo Esther, Chen (Exo), MC Ding Dong	Haha filled in as MC.
613	April 17	June Elizabeth Kang, Jeong Kyung-mi, Kwon Da-hyun, Lim Yo-hwan	Yang Se-hyung filled in as MC.
614	April 24	Kang Ki-young, Byeon Woo-Min, Lee Hyun-jin, Jung Yi-rang	Heo Kyung-hwan filled in as MC.
615	May 1	Lee Ji-hye, Ahn Young-mi, Park Kyung (Block B), Choi Wook	Kim Se-jeong (Gugudan) filled in as MC.
616	May 8	Dong Ji-hyun, Byun Jung-soo, Yum Kyung-hwan, Choi Hyun-seok	P.O (Block B) filled in as MC.
617	May 15	Ryu Seung-soo, Park Seon-ju, Lee Da-ji, Park Ji-woo	Ha Sung-woon (HOTSHOT) filled in as MC.
618	May 22	Kim Byung-ji, Joo Young-hoon, Jung Sung-ho, Sean	Dindin filled in as MC.
619	May 29	Ham So-won, Song Ga-in, Giant Pink, Shownu (Monsta X)	Ahn Young-mi filled in as MC.
620	June 5	Rhymer, Muzie, Lee Dae-hwi (AB6IX), MC Gree	Park Jin-young (GOT7) filled in as MC.
621	June 12	Kyuhyun (Super Junior), Eun Ji-won (Sechs Kies), Kang Seung-yoon (Winner), Lee Jin-ho	Lee Seung-hoon (Winner) filled in as MC.
622	June 19	Nam Jin, Yoon Soo-hyun, Swings, Code Kunst	Shorry (Mighty Mouth) filled in as MC.
623	June 26	Hong Hyun-hee, Kim Ho-young, Bona (Cosmic Girls), Dotty	Ahn Young-mi joins the show as a permanent host.
624	July 3	Lee Gwang-yeon, Oh Se-hun (footballer), Kim Hyun-woo, Hwang Tae-hyeon, Choi Jun	
625	July 10	Kim Sung-ryung, Kim Byung-hyun, Nam Chang-hee, Son Jeong-eun	
626	July 17	Han Ji-hye, Lee Sang-woo, Oh Ji-eun, Lee Tae-sung	
627	July 24	Kim Kyung-ho, Kim Ga-yeon, Park Myung-hoon, Ahn Il-kwon	
628	July 31	Kim Na-hee, Jun Jin, Hangzoo, Choiza	
629	August 7	Kim Jang-hoon, Don Spike, Hyomin, Lee Jin-hyuk (UP10TION)	
630	August 14	Park Joong-hoon, Hur Jae, Kim Gyu-ri, Lee Sung-woo	
631	August 21	Lee Dong-woo, Jang Young-ran, Won Heum (Norazo), Jonathan	
632	August 28	Ha Chun-hwa, Jung Tae-woo, Seunghee (Oh My Girl), Han Tae-ung	
633	September 4	Baek Ji-young, Sunmi, Song Yuvin, Lee Seok-hoon	
634	September 11	Jang Hang-jun, Kim Eana, Parc Jae-jung, Yoo Se-yoon	Yoon Jong-shin's last episode as permanent host.
635	September 18	Seung Guk-lee, Im Chang-jung, Kim Dae-hui, Kim Ji-min	Yoon Sang-hyun filled in as MC.
636	September 25	Oh Yoon-ah, Kim Soo-yong, Irene, Ha Seung-jin	Kim Bum-soo filled in as MC.
637	October 2	Kim Eung-soo, Park Sang-min, Car, the Garden, Bassagong	Jung Jae-hyung filled in as MC.
638	October 9	Kim Yeon-koung, Oh Se-keun, Hyungdon and Daejun	Kwon Yul filled in as MC.
639	October 16	Great Library, Lee So-ra, Fly to the Sky	Lee Sang-yeob filled in as MC.
640	October 23	Um Hong-gil, Han Bo-reum, Lee Bong-won, Heo Ji-woong	Yook Joong-wan filled in as MC.
641	October 30	Boom, Insooni, Noh Sa-yeon, Soyeon ((G)I-dle)	Brian Joo (Fly to the Sky) filled in as MC.
642	November 6	Jo Hyun-jae, Kim Seung-hyun, Kim Sung-eun, Han Sang-jin	Defconn filled in as MC.
643	November 13	Kim Yong-myeong, Jang Sung-kyu, Dawn, Solbi	Yoo Se-yoon filled in as MC.
644	November 20	Kim Young-ok, Lee Hye-jung, Jung Young-joo, Lee Mi-do	Boom filled in as MC.
645	November 27	Kim Dong-wan (Shinhwa), Kim Ji-sook (Rainbow), Seo Hyo-rim, Park Ji-yoon	Paul Kim filled in as MC.
646	December 4	EXO (Suho, Baekhyun, Chanyeol, Chen, Kai, Sehun)	Chen filled in as MC.
647	December 11	On Joo-wan, Oh Chang-seok, Michael Lee, Park Jung-ah	Jun Jin filled in as MC.
648	December 18	Kim Jong-min, Lee Gyu-sung, Seo Hyun-chul, Dawon (SF9)	Boo Seung-kwan (Seventeen) filled in as MC.
649	December 25	Sam Okyere, Sleepy, Kim Young-ho, JooE (Momoland)	Jang Dong-yoon filled in as MC.

== 2020 ==
List of episodes (2020)

Episode #	Broadcast Date	Guests	Notes
650	January 1	Kim So-hyun, Faker, Kim Hee-chul (Super Junior), Jung Saem-mool	DDotty filled in as MC.
651	January 8	Jung Ho-keun, Kwon Il-yong, Lee Yeon-soo, Jang Dong-min	Kim Su-yong filled in as MC.
652	January 15	Kwon Sang-woo, Jung Joon-ho, Hwang Woo-seul-hye, Lee Yi-kyung	Kim Dong-wan filled in as MC.
653	January 22	Kim Hyun-chul, Seo Yu-ri, Lee Dong-jin, Kim Sung-kyu (Infinite)	Eun Ji-won filled in as MC.
654	January 29	Lee Dong-gun, Kang Kyung-joon, Son Seung-yeon, Kim Sun-young	Lee Jin-ho filled in as MC.
655	February 5	Kim Yeong-cheol, Park Na-rae, Giriboy, Kapichu	Kim Sung-kyu (Infinite) filled in as MC.
656	February 12	Song Dae-kwan, Jung Kyung-chun, Park Hyun-woo, Seol Ha-yoon	Shindong (Super Junior) filled in as MC.
657	February 19	Kim Bo-sung, Jang Su-won (Sechs Kies), Lim Eun-kyung, Kim Kwang-kyu	Kim Sung-hyun filled in as MC.
658	February 26	Kim Soo-ro, Park Gun-hyung, Lee Chun-hee, Jo Jae-yoon	Lee Jin-hyuk filled in as MC.
659	March 4	Yang Joon-il, Joon Park (g.o.d), Ravi (VIXX), Lia Kim	Hwang Jae-sung filled in as MC.
660	March 11	Jo Jung-chi, Park Seul-gi, Park Hyun-bin, Lee Ha-jung	Sean (Jinusean) filled in as MC.
661	March 18	Im Ha-ryong, Yang Dong-geun, Ong Seong-wu, Kim Min-ah	Ravi (VIXX) filled in as MC.
662	March 25	Hong Hye-geol, Lee Seung-yoon, Yoon Eun-hye, Ahn Hyun-mo	Lee Yi-kyung filled in as MC.
663	April 1	Lim Young-woong, Young Tak, Jang Minho, Lee Chan-won	Hong Jin-young filled in as MC.
664	April 8	Lim Young-woong, Young Tak, Jang Minho, Lee Chan-won	Hong Jin-young filled in as MC.
665	April 22	Kim Tae-gyun, Moon Se-yoon, Hwang Je-sung, Choi Sung-min	Lee Sang-yeob filled in as MC.
666	April 29	Park Hae-mi, Hong Yoon-hwa, Lim Hyun-ju, Kim Yul-hee	Bong Tae-gyu filled in as MC.
667	May 6	Park Ye-eun, Pyo Chang-won, Jeon Tae-poong, Kim Kyung-jin	Lee Yong-jin filled in as MC.
668	May 13	Lee Se-dol, Lee Guk-joo, Ahn Ji-young (Bolbbalgan4), Hyojung (Oh My Girl)	Min-hyun (NU'EST) filled in as MC.
669	May 20	Shin Hyun-joon, Kim Soo-mi, Kim Tae-jin, Yun Hyeong (iKon)	Jang Minho filled in as MC.
670	May 27	Tae Jin-ah, Eru, Lee Dong-joon, Lee Il-min	Gree filled in as MC.
671	June 3	Hyun Young, Jo Young-gu, Heo Kyung-hwan, Yeo Hyun-soo	Hwang Chi-yeol filled in as MC.
672	June 10	Lee Jong-hyeok, Jeon Soo-kyung, Im Gi-hong, Hong Ji-min	Yang Se-chan filled in as MC.
673	June 17	Kang Susie, Kim Mi-ryeo, Jun Hyo-seong, Kim Ha-young	Muzie filled in as MC.
674	June 24	Park Jin-hee, Kim Na-young, Ji Sang-ryeol, Hoshi (Seventeen)	Heo Ji-woong filled in as MC.
675	July 1	Kang Sung-yeon, Jo Han-sun, Lee Young-ji, Kim Soo-chan	Heo Kyung-hwan filled in as MC.
676	July 8	Tak Jae-hoon, Ko Eun-ah, Lee Eun-gyeol, Victor Han	Lee Ji-hye filled in as MC.
677	July 15	Chae Jung-an, Park Seong-ho, K.Will, Wooshin (UP10TION)	Muzie filled in as MC.
678	July 22	Jeon So-mi, Heo Hoon, Yoo Min-sang, Lee Yeon-bok	Sam filled in as MC.
679	July 29	Kwanghee (ZE:A), Jessi, Ayumi, Nam Yoon-soo	Ji Suk-jin filled in as MC.
680	August 5	Lee Hye-young, Kim Ho-joong, Stephanie, Soyeon	Kim Jong-min filled in as MC.
681	August 12	Park Jin-young, Sunmi, Kim Hyeong-seok	Defconn filled in as MC.
682	August 19	Na Moon-hee, Lee Hee-joon, Choi Won-young, Lee Soo-ji	Jung Il-woo filled in as MC.
683	August 26	Jang Young-nam, Kim Hyun-ah, Shin So-yul, Kim Yo-han	Jun Jin filled in as MC.
684	September 2	Son Yeon-jae, Yoo Sang Moo, Lee Hye-sung, Choi Yeo-jin	Kangnam filled in as MC.
685	September 9	Choi Soo-jong, Ha Hee-ra, Lee Tae-ran, Park Sang-hyun	Heo Kyung-hwan filled in as MC.
686	September 16	Jin Tae-hyun, Park Si-eun, Sam, Lee Jin-sung	Lee Sang-min filled in as MC.
687	September 23	Joo Won, Ivy, Choi Jung-won, Park Joon-myeon	Yoo Min-sang filled in as MC.
688	September 30	Baek Il-seob, Lee Yu-bi, Sung Dong-il, Kim Hee-won	Park Sung-kwang filled in as MC.
689	October 7	Han Da-Gam, Hwang Seok-jeong, Park Tae-joon, Lee Geun	Hong Seok-cheon filled in as MC.
690	October 14	Park Geun-hyung, Park Hwee-soon, Loco, Crush	Dawn filled in as MC.
691	October 21	Lee Eun-mi, Jin Sung, Kolleen Park, Lee Geon-woo	Jun Hyun-moo filled in as MC.
692	October 28	Twice	Defconn filled in as MC.
693	November 4	Yoo Hyun-sang, Han Kyung-rok, Jay Park, pH-1	Lee Jun-young filled in as MC.
694	November 11	Lee Juck, Paul Kim, Jung-in, Key	Cha Tae-hyun filled in as MC.
695	November 18	Park Mi-sun, Bada, Henry, Jaejae	Park Ji-hoon filled in as MC.
696	November 25	Kim Kwang-hyun, Yang Joon-hyuk, Shim Soo-chang, Park Sung-kwang	Yeom Kyung-hwan filled in as MC.
697	December 2	Jung Woo, DinDin, Sleepy, Kim Byung-chul	Lee Gi-kwang filled in as MC.
698	December 9	Bobby Kim, Gaeko, Jeok Jae, Song So-hee	Lee Juck filled in as MC.
699	December 16	Uhm Young-Soo, Nancy Lang, Ham Yon-Ji, George	Jang Sung-Kyu filled in as MC.
700	December 23	Yoon Jong-Shin, Yoo Se-Yoon, Cho Kyu-hyun	700th Birthday Party Special
701	December 30	Jo Young-Nam, Song Ga-In, Swings, Soo-Hyun (U-KISS)	DinDin filled in as MC.

== 2021 ==
List of episodes (2021)

Episode #	Broadcast Date	Guests	Notes
702	January 6	Baek Ji-young, Soyul, Kim Sae-rom, Syuka	Jang Dong-min filled in as MC.
703	January 13	Son Beom-soo, Jun Jin, Solbi, Chani	Tak Jae-hoon filled in as MC.
704	January 20	Lee Bong-won, Yeo Esther, Tei, Tzuyang	Ji Sang-ryeol filled in as MC.
705	January 27	June Kang, Kim So-yeon, Hyoyeon, Aiki	Yunho filled in as MC.
706	February 3	Kwon In-ha, Park Sun-joo, Julien Kang, LEENALCHI's Kwon Song-hee and Shin Yoo-jin	Haha filled in as MC.
707	February 10	Kim Yeon-ja, Lucky, Hong Jam-eon, Kim So-yeon, Ahn Sung-joon	Shindong (Super Junior) filled in as MC.
708	February 17	Kim Bum-soo, Kang Daniel, Yang Chi-seung, Park Young-jin	Sunmi filled in as MC.
709	February 24	Oh Eun-young, Song Chang-eui, Kim Ji-hye, Lee Ji-hye	Sam filled in as MC.
710	March 3	Im Sang-a, Oh Hyun-kyung, Lee Yong-jin, Lee Jin-ho	Do Kyung-wan filled in as MC.
711	March 10	Kim Dong-hyun, Mo Tae-bum, Lee Hyung-taik, Yoon Suk-min	Na Tae-joo filled in as MC.
712	March 17	Hong Seo-beom, Sayuri Fujita, Jessi, Lee Seung-hoon	Kim Young-chul filled in as MC.
713	March 24	Lee Kye-in, Kim Jun-ho, Hwang Hye-young, Ralral	Yoo Min-sang filled in as MC.
714	March 31	Jang Dong-min, Kang Yoo-mi, Hwang Hyun-hee, Jung Cheol-gyu	Yoo Se-yoon joins the show as a permanent host.
715	April 7	Joo Byung-Jin, Noh Sa-yeon, Park Soo-Hong, Park Kyung-Rim	
716	April 14	Hong Seok-cheon, Cho Jun-ho, Jasson, Kim Hae-jun	
717	April 21	Kang Ha-neul, Kim Kang-hoon, Hani, Kang Yeong-seok	
718	April 28	Im Mi-sook, Kim Hak-rae, Son Min-soo, Im La-la	
719	May 5	Lee Hong-gi, Hahm Eun-jung, Wang Seok-hyeon, Lee Eugene, Jeon Sung-cho	
720	May 12	Jeong Jun-ha, Kim Jong-min, KCM, Na In-woo	
721	May 19	Kim Seung-woo, Ye Ji-won, Kim Wan-sun, Brian (Fly to the Sky))	
722	May 26	Lee Geum-hee, Sung Si-kyung, Lee Seok-hoon, Kim Bo-min	
723	June 2	Chae Ri-na, Hwang Chi-yeul, Hong Sung-heon, Kim Ga-young	
724	June 9	Kim Bo-yeon, Kim Eung-soo, Cha Ji-yeon, Lee Ho-chul	
725	June 16	Jung Jae-yong (DJ DOC), Shin Ji (Koyote), Kim Yong-jun, Kim Dong-wan	
726	June 23	Kim Bo-sung, Kim Pro (Kim Dong-hwan), GREE, Shin A-young	
727	June 30	Lee Kyung-sil, Sunwoo Yong-nyeo, Kim Ji-sun, Jo Kwon	
728	July 7	Hong Yun-hwa, Lee Eun-hyeong, Ha Yeon-soo, Chuu	
729	July 14	Yang Jae-jin, Song Eun-i, Kim Soo-yong, Kim Sang-hyuk, Outsider	
730	July 21	Im Chae-moo, Lee Jun-hyeok, Oh Jong-hyuk, Park Goon	
731	July 28	Jo Se-ho, Lee Chan-hyuk (AKMU), Lee Hye-jeong, Kim Sung-il	
732	August 11	Jung Bo-seok, Lee Ji-hoon, Kim Ho-young, Lee Eun-ji	
733	August 18	Oh Jin-hyek, Kim Woo-jin, An Chang-rim, Kim Jung-hwan, Gu Bon-gil	
734	August 25	Joon Park, Hwang Soo-kyung, Chung Seung-je, Kwon Hyuk-soo	
735	September 1	Park Sun-young, Lee Gook-ju, Gyeongree, Ok Ja-yeon	
736	September 8	Jang Young-ran, Park Eun-young, Jung Ka-eun, Alberto Mondi	Kim Soo-yong filled in as MC for Gook-jin.
737	September 15	Kim Hyeong-seok, DJ Tukutz (Epik High), Lee Hi, Lee Young-ji, Wonstein (MSG Wannabe)	
738	September 22	Park Jeong-ah, Pyo Seung-ju, Jeong Ji-yun	
739	September 29	Kim Yeon-koung, Kim Su-ji, Yang Hyo-jin	
740	October 6	Lee Tae-gon, Choi Dae-chul, Kim Joon-hyun, Tae Hang-ho	
741	October 13	Jo Hye-ryun, Shin Bong-sun, Kim Min-kyung, Oh Na-mi	
742	October 20	Hur Jae, Jin Jong-oh, Park Sang-young, Choi Young-jae	
743	October 27	Kim Shin-young, Kim Yoon-joo, Ji-Ho(Oh My Girl), Yang Hee-eun	
744	November 3	Lee Jun-ho, Oh Dae-hwan, Choi Young-joon, Hyun Bong-sik	
745	November 10	Kim Yu-na, Yoon Hye-Jin, Bae Yoon-jung, Monika	
746	November 17	Jang Hyuk, Yu Oh-seong, Kim Bok-jun, Lee Jung, Yoon Hyoung-bin	
747	November 24	Kim Young-ok, Jeong Dong-won, Park So-dam, Solar	
748	December 1	Park So-hyun, Hong Hyun-hee, Noze, Anupam Tripathi	
749	December 8	Jang Do-yeon, Shin Gi-ru, Code Kunst, Jang Won-young	
750	December 15	Jang Hyun-sung, Kim Jung-min, Ahn Eun-jin, Kim Kyung-nam	
751	December 22	Pyo Chang-won, Kwon Il-yong, Soo Jung Lee, Park Ji-seon, Hwang Min-gu	

== 2022 ==
List of episodes (2022)

Episode #	Broadcast Date	Guests	Notes
752	January 5	Seo Jang-hoon, Yoo Min-sang, Nam Bo-ra, Koo Ja-wook	
753	January 12	Kim Dae-hee, Jung Sung-ho, Lee Su-ji, Joo Hyun-young, Kim Doo-young	
754	January 19	Jeong Youn-joo, Lee Jung-hyun, Jonathan, Gabee	
755	January 26	Lee Jun-ho, Lee Se-young, Jang Hye-jin, Oh Dae-hwan, Kang Hoon, Lee Min-ji	
756	February 2	Lee Jun-ho, Lee Se-young, Jang Hye-jin, Oh Dae-hwan, Kang Hoon, Lee Min-ji	
757	February 9	Kim So-hyun, Lee Young-hyun (Big Mama), Sunye, Song So-hee, Hwang So-yoon	
758	February 23	Ji Seok-jin, Ji Sang-ryul, Nam Chang-hee (comedian), Parc Jae-jung	
759	March 2	Kwak Yoon-gy, Hwang Dae-heon, Kim Dong-wook, Park Jang-hyuk, Lee June-seo, Kim A-lang	
760	March 16	Ahn Ji-hwan, Jung Sun-hee, Yoon Min-soo, Jang Ye-won	
761	March 23	Lee Eun-saem, Hwang Je-seung, Kang Hyung-wook, Kim Ha-kyun	
762	March 30	Kim Seung-soo, Shin Joo-ah, Seo Hyo-rim, Jang Dong-min	
763	April 6	Park Jong-bok, Sleepy, Yeo Esther, Go Eun-ah	
764	April 13	Han Suk-joon, Mino, Jun Hyun-moo, Yaongyi	Jang Dong-min filled in as MC.
765	April 20	Jung Joon-ho, Shin Hyun-joon, Baek Sung-hyun, Song Jin-woo	
766	April 27	Myung Se-bin, Yoon Eun-hye, Bona, Heo Kyung-hwan	
767	May 4	Psy, Sung Si-kyung, Jeon So-yeon, Lee Seung-yoon	
768	May 11	Ravi, Rain, Leejung Lee, Jung Ho-young	Special performance by Ciipher
769	May 18	Jung Chan-sung, Yoshihiro Akiyama, June Kang, Rhymer	
770	May 25	Kang Soo-jung, Hyun Young, Choi Yeo-jin, Lee Ahyumi	
771	June 8	Kim Moon-jung, Seo Yi-sook, Song Ga-in, Lee Hong-gi	
772	June 15	Kim Eana, Lee Ji-hye, Kim Min-kyu, Yang Se-hyung	
773	June 22	Baek Ji-young, Lena Park, Yang Ji-eun, Eom Ji-yoon	
774	June 29	So Yoo-jin, Park Goon, Kim Da-hyeon, Seo Dong-joo/Danielle Suh	
775	July 6	Kangnam, Cha Seo-won, Uhm Hyun-kyung, Ji Hyun-woo	Special performance by Ji Hyun-woo's band "SGO"
776	July 13	Kim Jong-min, Honey J, Meenoi, Dawn, Jo Kwon	
777	July 20	Kim Byeong-ok, Hyuna, Han Young, Tsuki (Billlie)	
778	July 27	Sayuri Fujita, DinDin, Gree, Lee Hyun-yi	
779	August 3	Park Joon-geum, Lee Joo-seung, Lee Won-jong, Yang Hyun-min	
780	August 10	Jin Seo-yeon, Choi Deok-moon, Park Myung-hoon, Park Kyung-hye	
781	August 17	Ryu Seung-soo, Kim Gyu-ri, Kim Ho-young, Yoo Hee-kwan	
782	August 24	Im Chang-jung, Park Joon-myeon, Dahyun, Lee Mu-jin	
783	August 31	Kim Wan-sun, Mimi (Oh My Girl), Cha Jun-hwan, Jonathan, Patricia Yiombi	
784	September 7	Jin Sung, Kim Ho-joong, Kum Jan-di, Shindong, Chaeryeong (Itzy)	
785	September 14	Oh Yoon-ah, Sandara Park, Yang Jae-woong, Justin Harvey	
786	September 21	Min Woo-hyuk, Lee Jang-woo, Coogie, Simon Dominic	
787	September 28	Kim Young-chul, Ha Hee-ra, Im Ho, Jung Gyu-woon	Do Kyung-wan filled in as MC for Se-yoon
788	October 5	Lee Beom-soo, Lee Jun-hyeok, Jung Hyuk, Kim Won-hoon	
789	October 12	Jang Dong-min, Choi Min-hwan, Cho Choong-hyun, Sam Hammington, Jasson	
790	October 19	Park Soo-hong, Hong Sung-woo, Yang Chi-seung, Kim Yong-myung	Song Eun-i filled in as MC for Young-mi
791	October 26	Choi Joon-suk, Lee Dae-ho, KCM, Joon Park	
No broadcast on November 2 due to the aftermath of the Seoul Halloween crowd crush.
792	November 9	Lee Seok-hoon, Tei, Key, Choi Min-ho	
793	November 16	Song Il-kook, Bae Hae-sun, Jeong Dong-won, Trix, Jo Hye-ryun	
No broadcasts on November 23 and November 30 due to the 2022 FIFA World Cup
794	December 7	Ahn Jae-wook, Shin Sung-woo, Yoon Byung-hee, Kim Kyung-wook	Kim Kyung-wook appeared as Yukio Tanaka (one of his characters) for the first half of the episode.
795	December 14	Lee Soon-jae, Oh Hyun-kyung, Jin Ji-hee, Julien Kang	
796	December 21	Gil Hae-yeon, AIKI, Lee Il-hwa, Lee Guk-joo, Jung Hye-sung	
797	December 28	Lee Yeon-bok, Kim Byung-hyun, Noh Sa-yeon, HeeBab	

== 2023 ==
List of episodes (2023)

Episode #	Broadcast Date	Guests	Notes
798	January 4	Kwon Sang-woo, Lee Min-jung, Kim Nam-hee, Yoo Seon-ho	
799	January 11	Han Ga-in, Jaejae, Jung Eun-ji, An Yu-jin	
800	January 18	Lee Kyung-kyu, Kim Jun-hyun, Kwon Yul, Oking	
801	January 25	Joo Woo-jae, BamBam, Hwang Kwang-hee, Hwang Su-kyung	
802	February 1	Lee Soo-ji, Pak Se-ri, Kim Hae-joon, KWAKTUBE	
803	February 8	Yoon Yoo-sun, Kwak Sun-young, Gong Min-jeung, Joo Hyun-young	
804	February 15	Jang Young-ran, Ahn Hyun-mo, Hong Yoon-hwa, Kim Bo-reum	
805	February 22	Park Hang-seo, Lee Chun-soo, Hur Jae, Ha Seung-jin	
806	March 1	Kang Susie, Bbaek Ga, Jeon Hye-bin, Jeong Saem-mool	
807	March 8	Koo Hye-sun, Jung Yi-rang, Lee Eun-ji, Lee Kwang-ki	
808	March 15	Kim Yon-ja, Lee Mi-do, Shin Gi-ru, Park Se-mi (Comedienne)	
809	March 22	Park Sung-woong, Park Sung-kwang, Seo Dong-won, Heo Kyung-hwan	
810	March 29	Kim Soo-mi, Yoon Jung-soo, Lee Ji-young (Instructor), Lee Yong-ju	
811	April 5	Bada, Jo Hyun-ah, Code Kunst, Kim Yong-pil	
812	April 12	Kang Hyung-wook, Jun Jin, Yoshihiro Akiyama/Choo Sung-hoon, DEX	
813	April 19	Park Hae-mi, Park Ki-woong, Yoo In-young, Pung Ja	
814	April 26	Choi Soo-jong, Park Young-jin, Syuka, Kwak Yoon-gy	
815	May 3	Kim Eung-soo, Kwon Il-yong, Yeom Kyung-hwan, Son Jun-ho	Ahn Young-mi leaves the show due to maternity
816	May 10	Kim Eung-soo, Kwon Il-yong, Yeom Kyung-hwan, Son Jun-ho	Ahn Young-mi leaves the show due to maternity
817	May 17	Jun Kwang-ryul, Hwang Je-sung, Hanhae, Chuu	Guest MC: Joo Hyun-young
818	May 24	Kim Chang-ok, Park Eun-hye, Hong Jin-ho, Pani Bottle	Guest MC: Lee Eun-ji
819	May 31	Yeo Esther, Jo Young-gu, Kim Dae-ho, Park Ji-min	Guest MC: Code Kunst
820	June 7	Lee Sang-woo, Solbi, Park Hyo-jun, Kim Ah-young	Guest MC: Lee Soo-ji
821	June 14	Tablo, Lee Jang-won, Gabee, Yuqi	Guest MC: Kim Ho-young
822	June 21	Choi Jin-hyuk, Kim Young-jae, Shin Hyun-soo, Bae Yoo-ram	Guest MC: Jang Young-ran
823	June 28	Byun Woo-min, Lee Ji-hoon, Ko Kyu-pil, Shin Hyun-ji	Guest MC: Park Se-mi (Comedienne)
824	July 5	Pyo Chang-won, Park Ji-hoon, Sean, Shim Hyung-tak	Guest MC: Hwang Kwang-hee
825	July 12	Choi Sung-kook, Se7en, Swings, Na Sun-uk (YouTuber)	Guest MC: DEX
826	July 19	June Kang, Sohn Mi-na, Hani, Fabien	Guest MC: Lee Seok-hoon
827	July 26	Park Joo-ho, Heo Ung, Jung Sung-ho, Sayuri Fujita	Guest MC: Lee Guk-joo
828	August 2	Kim So-hyun, Kim Tae-yeon, Park Joon-geum, Bae Yoon-jeong, Jeon Somi	Guest MC: Hong Hyun-hee
829	August 9	Kim Jae-won, Koo Jun-yup, Young Tak, Son Min-soo	Guest MC: Jang Do-yeon
830	August 16	Park So-hyun, Park Hyo-joo, Sandara Park, LeoJ (Makeup Artist)	Guest MC: Kim Dae-ho
831	August 23	Park Mi-ok, Kim Ji-seok, Kim Min-ho, Song Young-kyu	Guest MC: Shin Gi-ru
832	August 30	Lee Bong-won, Moon Hee-kyung, Yoon Seong-ho, Oh Seung-hoon	Guest MC: Gree
833	September 6	Kim Jong-min, Bbaek Ga, John Park, Hwasa, Hong Sung-min (Fantasy Boys)	Guest MC: Solbi
834	September 13	Kim Young-ok, Park Ha-na, Lee You-jin, Tzuyang	Guest MC: Bong Tae-gyu
835	September 20	Baek Ji-young, Im Won-hee, Jeong Seok-yong, Mimi (Oh My Girl)	Jang Do-yeon becomes the new MC replacing Ahn Young-mi
836	September 27	Jung Joon-ho, Jeong Jun-ha, Yoon Hyun-min, Yura	
No broadcast on October 4 due to the 2022 Asian Games and on October 11 due to special programming.
837	October 18	Jang Hang-jun, Song Eun-i, Jang Hyun-sung, Kim Poong	
838	October 25	Jo Hye-ryun, Jung Chan-sung, Kim Ho-young, Lee Eun-hyung	
839	November 1	Ryu Seung-soo, Eric Nam, DinDin, Nam You-joung (BB Girls), Lee Won-ji (YouTuber)	
840	November 8	Ida Daussy, Sam Hammington, Christina Confalonieri, Julian Quintart, Chon Tae-poong	
841	November 15	Kim Bok-jun, Muzie, Lee Ji-hye, Im Hyung-joon	
842	November 22	Kim Seung-soo, Matsuda Akihiro (Real Estate Agent/YouTuber), Kangnam, Kim Yong-myung	
843	November 29	Jang Dong-min, Park Jae-jung, Jung Yong-hwa, Kwon Eun-bi	
844	December 6	Park Jin-young, Kim Bum-soo, Kim Wan-sun, Park Mi-kyung	
845	December 13	Kim Sang-wook, Ha Seok-jin, Lee Si-won, Heize	
846	December 20	Lee Hye-young, Kang Soo-jung, Lee Hyun-yi, Ji Ye-eun	
847	December 27	Kwon Il-yong, Joo Hyun-young, Kim Dae-ho, KWAKTUBE	

== 2024 ==
List of episodes (2024)

Episode #	Broadcast Date	Guests	Notes
848	January 3	Joon Park, Brian Joo (Fly to the Sky), Yunho (TVXQ), Jung Jae-hyung	
849	January 10	Lee Geum-hee, Young K (Day6), Jonathan, Ma Sun-ho (Bodybuilder)	
850	January 17	Haha, Kim Sae-rom, Kim Hye-sun, Jo Jung-sik	
851	January 24	Hong Hyun Hee, Yoon Hye-jin, Lee Jae-won, Yoon Tae-jin	
852	January 31	Lee Eun-mi, Kim Joo-ryoung, Kim Shin-rok, Yuna (Itzy)	
853	February 7	Jung Jae-hyung, Chang Kiha, Car, the Garden, Bibi	
854	February 14	Kim Dong-hyun, KCM, Cho Won-hee, Son Dong-pyo (Mirae)	
855	February 21	Bae Sang-hoon, Yang Se-hyung, Lim Woo-il, Chambo (YouTuber)	
856	February 28	Lee Hyo-jung, Jo Woo-jong, Park Seul-gi, Kim Jun-ho, Sieun (STAYC)	
857	March 6	Yoon Do-hyun, Lyn, Chungha, Park We (YouTuber)	Special appearance by Song Ji-eun
858	March 13	Jang Hyuk, Kim Min-jae, Ha Do-kwon, Kim Do-hoon	
859	March 20	Byun Jin-sub, Boom, Kim Yoon-ji, Kim Min-seok (MeloMance)	
860	March 27	Kim Hee-chul, Leeteuk, Yesung, Eunhyuk	
861	April 3	Kim Jong-kook, Cha Hong, Kim Seon-tae (Civil Servant), Kim Yo-han (Actor)	
No broadcast on April 10 due to coverage of the 2024 South Korean legislative election.
862	April 17	Tae Jin-ah, Hong Seok-cheon, RalRal, Kang Jae-joon	
863	April 24	Lee Da-hae, Bada, Kwon Hyuk-soo, Jo Kwon (2AM)	
864	May 1	Yang Joon-hyuk, Yun Sung-bin, Jong Tae-se, Kim Kyung-wook, Shin Seul-ki	Kim Kyung-wook appeared as Kim Hong-nam and Yukio Tanaka, two of his characters
865	May 8	Park Yeong-gyu, Jang Su-won (Sechs Kies), Song Ji-eun, Park Ji-hyeon	
866	May 15	Kim Do-hyun, Kim Nam-hee, Tiffany Young, Choi Jae-rim	
867	May 22	Kim Jun-ho, Kim Dae-hee, Jang Dong-min, Hong In-gyu	
868	May 29	Song Seung-heon, Lee Si-eon, Oh Yeon-seo, Jang Gyu-ri	
869	June 5	Kim Chang-wan, Kim Yoon-ah, Jeong Dong-won (JD1), Danny Koo	
870	June 12	Choi Kang-hee, Lee Sang-yeob, Choi Hyun-woo, ORBIT (Scientist), Choi Ye-na	
871	June 19	Yoon Sang, Choi Daniel, Kwon Jung-yeol (10cm), Ko Young-bae (Soran)	
872	June 26	Jeon Han-gil (Instructor), Jo Hye-ryun, Shin Bong-sun, Jung Sang-hoon, Yoon Ga-yi	
873	July 3	Ock Joo-hyun, Ahn Hyun-mo, Jo Hyun-ah (Urban Zakapa), Seunghee (Oh My Girl)	
874	July 10	Sunwoo Yong-nyeo, Jung Young-ju, Jung Ji-sun (Chef), Honey J	
875	July 17	Jun Jin (Shinhwa), Hwanhee (Fly to the Sky), Gree, Felix (Stray Kids)	
876	July 24	Bae Cheol-soo, Kim Kyung-sik, Younha, Lee Seung-guk	
No broadcast on July 31 and August 7 due to live coverage of the 2024 Summer Olympics.
877	August 14	Sean, Lee Young-pyo, Yoon Se-ah, Heo Kyung-hwan	
878	August 21	Kolleen Park, Danielle Suh, Pung Ja, Eom Ji-yoon	
879	August 28	Shin Kye-sook (Author/Chef), June Elizabeth Kang, Kim Ye-won, Haewon (Nmixx)	
880	September 4	Oh Sang-uk, Gu Bon-gil, Kim Ye-ji, Kim Woo-jin, Lim Si-hyeon, Im Ae-ji	
881	September 11	Chae Jung-an, Jay Park, Kim Hae-joon, Chang Dong-Seon (Neuroscientist)	
882	September 18	Kim Chang-ok, Solbi, Hwasa, Lee Mu-jin, Park Seo-jin	
883	September 25	Kim Kyung-il (Psychologist), Kim Junsu, Gabee, Lee Chang-ho	
884	October 2	Shin Hyun-joon, Kim Hye-eun, Kim Jung-hyun, Choi Tae-joon	
885	October 9	Lee Kyung-kyu, Shin Gi-ru, Lee Yong-jin, Lee Seon-min	
886	October 16	Kim Byung-man, Kim Jae-joong (JX), Kim Dong-jun (ZE:A), Cao Lu (Fiestar)	Special appearances by Sam Hammington and Fiestar (except Linzy)
887	October 23	Shin Ae-ra, Yoon Yoo-sun, Lee Hye-won, Oh Yoon-ah, Yu Hye-ju (YouTuber)	
888	October 30	Milanonna (YouTuber), Choi Hyun-seok, Kwon Yul, Lim Woo-il	
889	November 6	Yeo Esther, Lee Dong-jin, Kim So-hyun, Kim Ddol-ddol (YouTuber)	
890	November 13	Seo Bum-soo, Han Sang-bo (Doctor/Hair Expert), Yoon Sung-ho, Mimiminu	Yoon Sung-ho appeared as DJ NewJeansNim, one of his characters
891	November 20	Pak Se-ri, Lee Chun-soo, Lee Dae-ho, Jung Chan-sung	
892	November 27	Baek Ji-young, Kim Ji-yoon, Song Ga-in, Risabae	
No broadcast on December 4 due to special programming after the 2024 South Korean martial law crisis.
893	December 11	Han Eun-jung, Lee Soon-sil (Chef), Ha Yeon-soo, Crush	
894	December 18	Yeo Kyung-rae, Kim Hyung-mook, Jung Sung-ho, Lee Gun-joo	
895	December 25	Joon Park, Jo Hyun-ah (Urban Zakapa), Jung Ji-seon, Kim Seon-tae (Civil Servant)	

== 2025 ==
List of episodes (2025)

Episode #	Broadcast Date	Guests	Notes
No broadcast on January 1 due to the mourning period after the Jeju Air Flight 2216 crash.
896	January 8	Jin Seo-yeon, Hwang Hyun-hee, Sung Jin (Monk), Ha Sung-yong (Priest)	
897	January 15	Choo Shin-Soo, Koo Hye-sun, Kwak Si-yang, Yoon Nam-no (Chef)	
898	January 22	Yoon Jong-shin, Kim Young-chul, Son Tae-jin, Choi Sang-yeop (Lucy)	
899	January 29	Lim Yo-hwan, Jo Hyun-jae, Lee Eun-gyeol, ORBIT (Scientist), Park Young-jin	
900	February 5	Kim Jong-min, Moon Se-yoon, Park Na-rae, Code Kunst	900th episode special with representatives of the longest running shows in other networks.
901	February 12	Kim Jong-min, Moon Se-yoon, Park Na-rae, Code Kunst	900th episode special with representatives of the longest running shows in other networks.
902	February 19	Kim Nam-il, Kwak Beom, Ji Ye-eun, Jung Ho-chul, Shin Kyu-jin	
903	February 26	Jang Dong-min, Hong Jin-ho, Pani Bottle, Heo Seong-beom (YouTuber/Model)	
904	March 5	Kim Young-ok, Na Moon-hee, Yang Jung-a, Kim Jae-hwa, Kim Ah-young	
905	March 12	Park Kyung-lim, Sunye, Ha Won-mi (YouTuber/Wife of Choo Shin-Soo), Jeong Dong-won	
906	March 19	Jung Joon-ho, Lee Hee-jin (Baby Vox), Jung Hee-won (Doctor), Swings	
907	March 26	Um Hong-gil, Lee Soo-geun, Kim Dae-ho, Sunwoo (The Boyz)	
908	April 2	Kwon Il-yong, Lee Dae-woo (Police Officer), Yang Na-rae, DinDin	
909	April 9	Woo Hee-jin, Hwang Dong-ju, Mimi (Oh My Girl), Lee Si-an (Model/Influencer)	
910	April 16	Yoshihiro Akiyama, Jeong Suk-yong, Nam Chang-hee, Lee Gwan-hee	
911	April 23	Ko Jun, K.Will, Kim Poong, Kangnam	Kim Gook-jin is absent due to the death of his mother. Special MC: Lee Yong-jin
912	April 30	Lee Yeon-bok, Jang Shin-young, Fly to the Sky (Brian Joo & Hwanhee)	
913	May 7	Song Il-kook, Oh Min-ae, Jung Si-a, KCM	
914	May 14	Noh Sa-yeon, Hyun Young, Bibi, Charlesenter (YouTuber)	
915	May 21	Baek Ji-yeon, Hong Hyun Hee, Choi Jung-hoon (Jannabi), Min Kyung-Ah	
916	May 28	Lee Kyung-sil, Lee Ho-seon (Psychologist), Choi Yeo-jin, Sayuri Fujita	
917	June 4	In Gyo-jin, Ji Seung-hyun, Tei, Heo Kyung-hwan	
918	June 11	Do Ji-won, Kim Geum-soon, Cha Chung-hwa, Han Ji-eun	
919	June 18	Kim Tae-gyun, Lee Jung, Lee Dae-hyung, Ko Woo-rim (Forestella)	Lee Jung appeared under the stage name Cheon Rok-dam as he has transitioned to trot music.
920	June 25	Lee Bong-won, Hong Seok-cheon, Cha Jun-hwan, Kang Ji-young	
921	July 2	Tablo, Tukutz (Epik High), Im Woo-il, Kim Won-hun	
922	July 9	Huh Young-man, Choiza (Dynamic Duo), Lee Guk-joo, Park Eun-young (Chef)	
923	July 16	Jang Keun-suk, Lee Hong-gi (F.T. Island), Soobin (Tomorrow X Together), Kim Shin-young	
924	July 23	Im Won-hee, Lee Ki-chan, Lee Sang-joon, Yoon Hyeong-bin	
925	July 30	Kim Yon-ja, Jo Hye-ryun, Kim Su-ji, Tzuyang	
926	August 6	Kim Jang-hoon, Bobby Kim, Jo Sung-mo, Son Ho-young (g.o.d)	
927	August 13	Chun Jung-myung, Choi Hong-man, Lee Joo-seung, Jo Kwon (2AM)	
928	August 20	Lee Se-dol, Kim Hee-chul (Super Junior), Calm Down Man (Cartoonist), Kwon Seong-jun (Chef)	
929	August 27	Kim Eung-soo, Kim Dong-wan (Shinhwa), Bbaek Ga (Koyote), Kim Ho-young	
930	September 3	Seo Jang-hoon, Shin Gi-ru, Shindong (Super Junior), Na Sun-uk (YouTuber)	
931	September 10	Kim Soo-yong, Im Hyung-joon, Shim Hyung-tak, Kim In-man (Real Estate Agent/YouTuber)	
932	September 17	Jeong Bo-seok, Lee Seok-hoon (SG Wannabe), Ong Seong-wu, Woodz	
933	September 24	Kim Mi-kyung, Jang So-yeon, Lee El, Im Soo-hyang	
934	October 1	Bong Tae-gyu, Ok Ja-yeon, Song Eun-i, Park So-ra, Hwang Jung-hye	
935	October 8	Jang Jin, Kim Ji-hoon, Kim Kyung-ran, Choi Ye-na	
936	October 15	Kang Ha-neul, Kim Young-kwang, Kang Young-seok, Kang Ji-young (Kara)	
937	October 22	Kim Kwang-kyu, Kim Wan-sun, Hong Yoon-hwa, Jo Jazz (Singer)	
938	October 29	Jeong Gwan Yong, Park So-hyun, Lee Jae-youl, Tsuki (Billlie)	
939	November 5	Park Jin-young, Ahn So-hee, Boom, Kwon Jin-ah	
940	November 12	Ji Hyun-woo, Ivy, Kim Jun-hyun, Kim Kyu-won (Comedian)	
941	November 19	Kim Suk-hoon, Kim Byung-hyun, Tyler Rasch, Tarzzan (AllDay Project)	
942	November 26	Lee Min-woo (Shinhwa), Kang Hyung-wook, Zion.T, Kwon Tto-tto (YouTuber)	
943	December 3	Kim Min-jong, Ye Ji-won, Kim Ji-yu (Comedian), Horseking (YouTuber)	
944	December 10	Heo Sung-tae, Shin Sung-rok, Jung Yi-rang, Kim Hae-jun	
945	December 17	Kim Tae-won (Boohwal), Lee Pil-mo, Kim Yong-myoung, Yoon (STAYC)	
946	December 24	Nam Jin, Seol Woon-do, Jadu, Seunghee (Oh My Girl)	
No broadcast on December 31 due to New Year's Eve special programming.

== 2026 ==
List of episodes (2026)

Episode #	Broadcast Date	Guests	Notes
947	January 7	Kim Dong-hyun, Hwang Kwang-hee, Dawn, Amotti	
948	January 14	Park Geun-hyung, Song Ok-sook, Choi Hyun-woo, Wonhee (Illit)	
949	January 21	Lee Geum-hee, Yeom Kyung-hwan, Koo Hye-sun, Jeon Min-ki	
950	January 28	Jeon Ho-young, Sam Kim, Kim Junsu, Jeong Sun-ah	
951	February 4	Kim Won-jun, Jo Hye-ryun, Hanhae, Gree	
952	February 11	Lee Dong-jin, Ahn Hyun-mo, ORBIT (Scientist), Nucksal	
953	February 18	Uhm Ji-won, Choi Dae-chul, Johan Kim, Baek Jin-kyung (YouTuber)	
954	February 25	Park Yeong-gyu, Hwang Jae-gyun, Yoo Hee-kwan, No Min-woo	
955	March 4	Oh Seung-hwan, Lee Cheol-min, Jo Hyun-ah (Urban Zakapa), Yang Sang-guk	
956	March 11	Jin Seo-yeon, Keum Sae-rok, Joo Jong-hyuk, Kwak Beom	
957	March 18	Boom, Moon Se-yoon, Nam Chang-hee, Kim Seon-tae (Civil Servant)	
958	March 25	Choi Min-jeong, Kim Gil-li, Kim Sang-kyum, Yu Seung-eun	2026 Winter Olympics medalists
959	April 1	Jo Gap-kyung, Chae Yeon, Go Woo-ri, Lee Chae-young (Fromis 9)	
960	April 8	Kim Soo-ro, Um Ki-joon, Park Gun-hyung, Kim Hyeong-mook	
961	April 15	Seo Hyun-chul, Jang Dong-min, Cha Ji-yeon, WING (Beatboxer)	
962	April 22	Ryu Jin, Ki Tae-young, Lucky, Song Ha-bin (comedian)	
963	April 29	Lee Jong-hyuk, Yoo Sun, Jeon Somi, Lee Dae-hwi (AB6IX)	
964	May 6	Choi Daniel, Nam Gyu-ri, Ahn Ji-young (BOL4), Beomgyu (Tomorrow X Together)	
965	May 13	Seo Kyung-seok, Choi Tae-seong, Kim Sung-eun, Hwang Min-ho	
966	May 20	Kim Chang-wan, Choi Jung-hoon (Jannabi), Roy Kim, Hanroro	
No broadcast on May 27 and June 3 due to the coverage of the 2026 South Korean local elections.
967	June 10	Joon Park (g.o.d), Jonathan Yiombi, Jeong Il-young (instructor), Dayoung (WJSN)	
968	June 17	Kim Jung-eun, Lee Han-wi, Solbi, Kinky (dancer)	
969	June 24	Lee Ji-young, Kim Dae-ho, Kyung Soo-jin, Kim Min-kyung (editor)	
970	July 1	Ryu Soo-young, Choi Jin-hyuk, Yoon Shi-yoon, Sandeul (B1A4)	
971	July 8	Lee Seung-mi, Jung Seon-hee, Kim Young-hee, Lee Seon-min	
972	July 15	Kim Sung-ryung, Yunho (TVXQ), Heo Kyung-hwan, Pung Ja	
973	July 22	Kim Jung-min, Kim Young-kwang, Lee Seung-woo, Jung Seung-hwan	
974	July 29	Yoon Mi-ra, Kangnam, Han Da-gam, Park Ji-hyeon	
975	August 5	Choi Won-young, Lee Tae-ran, Bada, Martin (Cortis)	
976	August 12	Hong Hyun Hee, Kim Moon-jeong, Lee Chang-ho, Yu Ho-jin	
977	August 19	Hong Hye-geol, Haha, Park Young-jin, Hukky Shibaseki (rapper)	
978	August 26	Hwang Seok-jeong, Lee Jun-hyeok, Seo Eun-kwang (BtoB), Yoo Young-woo (comedian)	
979	September 2	Ryu Seung-soo, Jo Hye-ryun, Sho Kasamatsu, Mimi (Oh My Girl)	
980	September 9	Kim Chang-ok (lecturer), Chang Kiha, Swings, Soyeon (I-dle)	Special voice appearance by Byun Yo-han via phone
981	September 16	Lee Hyung-taik, Lee Hye-jung, Cho Jun-ho, Minami (Rescene)	
982	September 23	Sunwoo Yong-nyeo, Lee Dae-ho, Young Tak, Kim Kyu-won (comedian)	
983	September 30	Park Mi-sun, Kim Jung-nan, Kim Sae-rom, Kim Su-mi (influencer)	
984	October 7	Choi Kang-hee, Oh Man-seok, Kim Won-hyo, Yang Chi-seung	
985	October 14	Park Joon-geum, Kim Young-chul, Hahm Eun-jung, Kang Kyun-sung	
986	October 21	Kim Young-beom, Choi Jun-yong, Kang Lee-seul, Biwesa Daniel Kashama, Nwamadi Joel Jin	2026 Asian Games medalists
987	October 28	Lee Kye-in, Yoon Taek, Yook Jung-wan, Kim Min	
988	November 4	Ahn Jae-wook, Jung Young-joo, Lily (Nmixx), Yoo Byung-kwon (YouTuber)	
989	November 11	Chang Han-na, Kim Hyun-chul, Ko Woo-rim (Forestella), Harimu (dancer)	
990	November 18	Jung Jae-hyung, Lee Juck, Young K (Day6), Kim Gan-ji (Sultan of the Disco)	
991	November 25	Jin Sung, Choi Jae-rim, DinDin, Lee Mu-jin	
