= Tsui Fang-hsuan =

Taiwanese taekwondo practitioner

Personal information
- Nationality: Taiwanese
- Born: 8 March 1984 (age 42)

Sport
- Sport: Taekwondo
Medal record
Representing Chinese Taipei
Women's taekwondo
World Championships
Bronze medal – third place	2007 Beijing	Heavyweight
Asian Championships
Silver medal – second place	2004 Seongnam	+72 kg
Bronze medal – third place	2006 Bangkok	-72 kg

Tsui Fang-hsuan (born 8 March 1984) is a Taiwanese taekwondo practitioner. She won a bronze medal in heavyweight at the 2007 World Taekwondo Championships. She won a silver medal at the 2004 Asian Taekwondo Championships, and a bronze medal at the 2006 Asian Taekwondo Championships.
