= 2004 Asian Taekwondo Championships =

Taekwondo competition

- Venue: Seongnam Gymnasium
- Location: Seongnam, South Korea
- Dates: 20–23 May 2004

Champions
- Men: South Korea
- Women: South Korea

The 2004 Asian Taekwondo Championships are the 16th edition of the Asian Taekwondo Championships, and were held in Seongnam, South Korea from May 20 to May 23, 2004.

== Medal summary ==
=== Men ===
Event	Gold	Silver	Bronze
Finweight −54 kg	Choi Yeon-ho; South Korea	Chen Wei-hsin; Chinese Taipei	Fahad Bin Dowisan; Saudi Arabia
Finweight −54 kg	Choi Yeon-ho; South Korea	Chen Wei-hsin; Chinese Taipei	Evgeniy Lee; Uzbekistan
Flyweight −58 kg	Ko Seok-hwa; South Korea	Mohammad Bagheri Motamed; Iran	Ahmed Qassem; Iraq
Flyweight −58 kg	Ko Seok-hwa; South Korea	Mohammad Bagheri Motamed; Iran	Tshomlee Go; Philippines
Bantamweight −62 kg	Kim Hyang-soo; South Korea	Su Tai-yuan; Chinese Taipei	Vũ Anh Tuấn; Vietnam
Bantamweight −62 kg	Kim Hyang-soo; South Korea	Su Tai-yuan; Chinese Taipei	Noel Moukhaiber; Lebanon
Featherweight −67 kg	Omid Gholamzadeh; Iran	Jamil Al-Khuffash; Jordan	Cao Trọng Chinh; Vietnam
Featherweight −67 kg	Omid Gholamzadeh; Iran	Jamil Al-Khuffash; Jordan	Sung Yu-chi; Chinese Taipei
Lightweight −72 kg	Son Jun-kil; South Korea	Vahid Abdollahi; Iran	Yesbol Yerden; Kazakhstan
Lightweight −72 kg	Son Jun-kil; South Korea	Vahid Abdollahi; Iran	Moataz Akkam; Syria
Welterweight −78 kg	Park Jeong-ho; South Korea	Hu Po-kang; Chinese Taipei	Alexander Briones; Philippines
Welterweight −78 kg	Park Jeong-ho; South Korea	Hu Po-kang; Chinese Taipei	Wong Kai Meng; Malaysia
Middleweight −84 kg	Jung Yong-han; South Korea	Bai Yu; China	Jalal Mahmoud; Jordan
Middleweight −84 kg	Jung Yong-han; South Korea	Bai Yu; China	Phan Tấn Đạt; Vietnam
Heavyweight +84 kg	Nguyễn Văn Hùng; Vietnam	Abdulqader Al-Adhami; Qatar	Ibrahim Aqil; Jordan
Heavyweight +84 kg	Nguyễn Văn Hùng; Vietnam	Abdulqader Al-Adhami; Qatar	Khaled Al-Dosari; Saudi Arabia

=== Women ===
Event	Gold	Silver	Bronze
Finweight −47 kg	Park Hyo-joo; South Korea	Nguyễn Thị Huyền Diệu; Vietnam	Awatef Al-Assaf; Jordan
Finweight −47 kg	Park Hyo-joo; South Korea	Nguyễn Thị Huyền Diệu; Vietnam	Eunice Alora; Philippines
Flyweight −51 kg	Wu Yen-ni; Chinese Taipei	Lee Ji-hye; South Korea	Elaine Teo; Malaysia
Flyweight −51 kg	Wu Yen-ni; Chinese Taipei	Lee Ji-hye; South Korea	Zain Al-Khasawneh; Jordan
Bantamweight −55 kg	Cosette Basbous; Lebanon	Renuka Magar; Nepal	Kylie Treadwell; Australia
Bantamweight −55 kg	Cosette Basbous; Lebanon	Renuka Magar; Nepal	Saule Sardarova; Kazakhstan
Featherweight −59 kg	Yoon Sung-hee; South Korea	Caroline Marton; Australia	Julie Dib; Lebanon
Featherweight −59 kg	Yoon Sung-hee; South Korea	Caroline Marton; Australia	Su Li-wen; Chinese Taipei
Lightweight −63 kg	Zong Shaojuan; China	H. Thoibinao Chanu; India	Carmen Marton; Australia
Lightweight −63 kg	Zong Shaojuan; China	H. Thoibinao Chanu; India	Kao Hui-chun; Chinese Taipei
Welterweight −67 kg	Lee Sun-hee; South Korea	Yang Wen-chen; Chinese Taipei	Toni Rivero; Philippines
Welterweight −67 kg	Lee Sun-hee; South Korea	Yang Wen-chen; Chinese Taipei	Rasha Al-Sadaga; Jordan
Middleweight −72 kg	Zhang Huixin; China	Kim Ye-son; South Korea	Nurgul Berkaliyeva; Kazakhstan
Middleweight −72 kg	Zhang Huixin; China	Kim Ye-son; South Korea	Criselda Roxas; Philippines
Heavyweight +72 kg	Kim Seung-hee; South Korea	Tsui Fang-hsuan; Chinese Taipei	Shaden Thweib; Jordan
Heavyweight +72 kg	Kim Seung-hee; South Korea	Tsui Fang-hsuan; Chinese Taipei	Trần Thị Ngọc Bích; Vietnam

== Medal table ==
Rank	Nation	Gold	Silver	Bronze	Total
1	South Korea	10	2	0	12
2	China	2	1	0	3
3	Chinese Taipei	1	5	3	9
4	Iran	1	2	0	3
5	Vietnam	1	1	4	6
6	Lebanon	1	0	2	3
7	Jordan	0	1	6	7
8	Australia	0	1	2	3
9	India	0	1	0	1
9	Nepal	0	1	0	1
9	Qatar	0	1	0	1
12	Philippines	0	0	5	5
13	Kazakhstan	0	0	3	3
14	Malaysia	0	0	2	2
14	Saudi Arabia	0	0	2	2
16	Iraq	0	0	1	1
16	Syria	0	0	1	1
16	Uzbekistan	0	0	1	1
Totals (18 entries)		16	16	32	64
