= Kang Susie =

South Korean singer (born 1967)

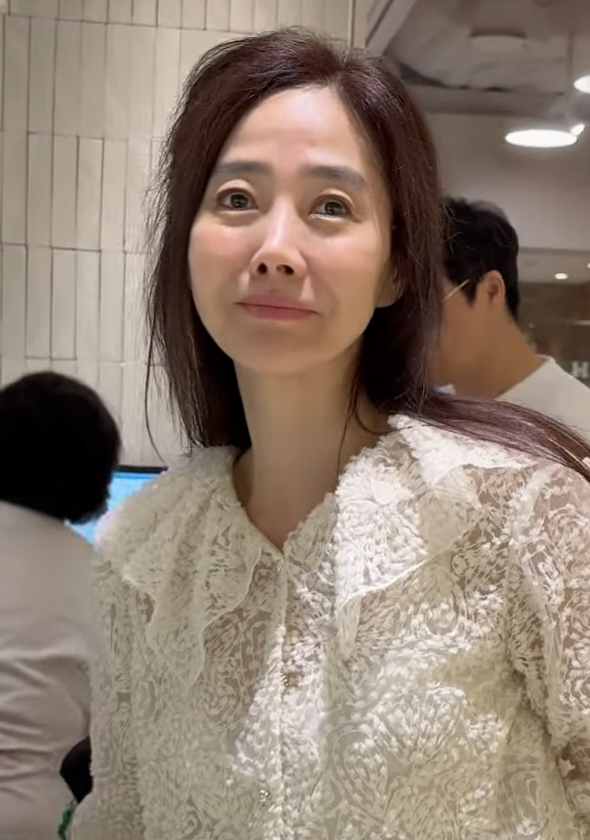
- Kang in April 2025

Background information
- Born: May 20, 1967 (age 59); Yongsan District, Seoul, South Korea
- Genre: K-pop
- Occupations: Singer-songwriter
- Years active: 1990–present
- Spouses: Unknown (m. 2001; div. 2006); Kim Gook-jin (m. 2018)
- Children: 1

Kang Susie (Korean: 강수지; born May 20, 1967) is a South Korean singer-songwriter. She debuted in 1990 with the release of her first album, "Violet Fragrance". She has also performed in Japan, and has also hosted radio program Kang Su-ji's Memories from 2013 to 2014.

== Early life ==
Kang Susie was born on May 20, 1967, in Seoul. She immigrated to New York at the age of 16 with her parents, where she lived in Queens and earned money as a teenager in shops and restaurants. She was part of a gospel choir at her local church.

At age 21, having won the Gold Prize at the East American Leg of MBC's College Music Festival in 1989, she was requested by the festival's MC, Song Seung-hwan, to debut as a singer in South Korea. He also recruited her to be the RJ of a newly founded Korean-language radio broadcast.

== Career ==
Kang returned to South Korea at the age of 23 to debut, where she promoted for 8 years, releasing hit singles such as "Violet Fragrance" (1990), "Scattered Days" (1991), "Scent In The Time" (1991), "You'll Know Then" (1993), "Winter Alone" (1995), "Orpheus' Tears" (1995) and "All I Need Is Time" (1995). She was known for her innocent image, looks and voice, as well as lauded for her songwriting abilities.

She dated fellow singer Shim Shin from around 1991 to 1993, fearlessly admitting so despite the social stigma against celebrities dating and the hate she received from Shim's teenage fans.

In 1994, she forayed into the Japanese music market, releasing various singles and acting in a musical, as well as a Japanese compilation album, "Self Selection".

== Personal life ==
Kang married a Korean-American dentist in the United States in 2001, which resulted in a divorce in mid-November 2006. Kang Susie divorced on the condition that she held custody of her then-3 year old daughter, Viviana. She raised her alone in South Korea until she remarried comedian and MC Kim Kook-jin in 2018, whom she met during the shoot of SBS variety show "Burning Youth".

== Discography ==
=== Studio albums ===
- Violet Fragrance (보라빛향기) (1990)
- Scattered Days (흩어진 나날들) (1991)
- Do You Know My Heart? (내 마음 알겠니) (1992)
- Then You'll Know (그때는 알겠지) (1993)
- To A Beautiful You (아름다운 너에게) (1994)
- I Won't Let You Go (널 보내지 않아) (1995)
- One & Only (1996)
- Kissing You (1997)
- Wish (1998)
- Loveletter Mailed 10 Years Ago (2002)
