= Park Wan-gyu =

South Korean politician (1942–2026)

- 박완규

Member of the National Assembly of South Korea
- In office 11 April 1981 – 10 April 1985

Personal details
- Born: 20 February 1942 Daejeon, Korea, Japan
- Died: 20 January 2026 (aged 83)
- Party: DKP
- Spouse: Jeong Yang-hae
- Children: Park Jong-gu; Park So-ae; Park Jong-hee
- Education: Konkuk University; Seoul National University
- Occupation: Accountant

Park Wan-gyu (Korean: 박완규; 20 February 1942 – 20 January 2026) was a South Korean politician. A member of the Democratic Korea Party, he served in the National Assembly from 1981 to 1985.

== Early life and education ==
Born in Daejeon on 20 February 1942, Park graduated from Daejeon Commercial High School (now Daejeon Woosong High School) and Konkuk University.

== Professional career ==
A qualified CPA, he passed the certified public accountant exam and served as a member of the Tax Review Committee at the Jungbu (Central) Regional National Tax Service. He advised major institutions on accounting and taxation. From 1982 to 1985, he was president of the Korean Institute of Certified Public Accountants, during which he contributed to enacting comprehensive tax agency management regulations and helped the organization gain standing director status in the Confederation of Asian and Pacific Accountants (CAPA) in 1983, as well as hosting the 18th CAPA meeting in Seoul in 1984.

== Political career ==
In the 1981 South Korean legislative election, he was elected as a Democratic Korea Party candidate in Daejeon Dong-gu. He served as floor vice secretary-general (원내부총무) in 1984. He ran unsuccessfully in the 1985 South Korean legislative election for the same party and district. After leaving the Democratic Korea Party in 1985, he joined pro-democracy groups like the Council for Promoting Democratization (standing operating committee member) and the National Movement for Constitution Acquisition (executive committee member). He later served as special economic advisor to the Peace Democratic Party chairman.

== Death ==
Park died on 20 January 2026, at the age of 86. The wake was at Seoul National University Hospital's funeral hall, with the procession on 22 January, and burial at Yongin Catholic Cemetery. He was survived by his wife, Jeong Yang-hae, and children, Park Jong-gu, Park So-ae and Park Jong-hee.
