= Kim Poong =

South Korean artist (born 1978)

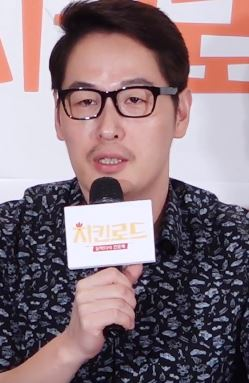
- Kim Poong in 2019
- Born: Kim Jeong-hwan; December 12, 1978 (age 47)

Kim Jeong-hwan (Korean: 김정환; born December 12, 1978), better known by his stage name Kim Poong (김풍), is a South Korean webcomic artist and television personality, appearing in many cooking programs.

== Career ==
He has been a cast member on the variety show Please Take Care of My Refrigerator since the original run beginning in 2014.

He also appeared in The Genius: Rules of the Game in 2013.
