= Victor Han =

South Korean and Brazilian musician

- Born: Victor Han Bacic Galvão; June 18, 1996 (age 30); São Paulo, Brazil
- Other names: Victor the Drum Destroyer; Victor the Drummer; 드럼좌; 빅터한
- Citizenship: South Korea
- Occupations: Musician; YouTuber; singer; songwriter
- Years active: 2020–present
- Musical career
- Origin: Seoul, South Korea
- Genres: Rock; K-pop
- Instruments: Drums; percussion; guitar; bass; piano; vocals
- Formerly of: About U

YouTube information
- Channel: Victor the Drum Destroyer
- Years active: 2020–2021
- Genres: Music; vlog; ASMR; comedy; satire
- Subscribers: 516 thousand
- Views: 36 million
- Last updated: January 18, 2021

Korean name
- Hangul: 한희재
- Hanja: 韓僖宰
- Revised Romanization: Han Huijae
- McCune–Reischauer: Han Hŭijae

Victor Han Bacic Galvão (Brazilian Portuguese: [ˈviktoʁ ˈʁɐ̃n baˈsik(i) ɡawˈvɐ̃w]; born June 18, 1996), better known as Victor Han (Korean: 빅터한), is a Brazilian-born South Korean drummer, former YouTuber, singer, songwriter, and a former member of K-pop boy band About U. He is considered the first K-pop idol of Brazilian origin.

Han is notable for his dynamic and expressive, powerful performances, giving him the moniker Victor the Drum Destroyer (Korean: 드럼좌; RR: Deureom Jwa). He began his career as a drummer and a guitarist of About U after training to be a K-Pop idol for eight years, which short-lived for just a shy of three weeks for breaking his drum stick on a live national television show. This incident prompted him to start his own YouTube channel, Victor the Drum Destroyer, which provided him a platform to showcase his ability to be a versatile drummer. Breaking drum sticks has now become synonymous with his performance like his moniker, given by his fans, suggests.

Although Han started his career as a drummer, he is a multi-instrumentalist — proficient at guitar, bass, piano — and a singer-songwriter. Currently, he is working on his first solo album while creating various content for his YouTube channel.

== Early life ==
Victor Han was born Victor Han Bacic Galvão on June 18, 1996, in São Paulo, Brazil, to a Brazilian father and a Korean mother. He is an only child. His mother immigrated to Brazil at the age of five. His father, professionally known as Cleto Baccic, is a prominent musical theatre actor in Brazil and won the Best Actor Award by the Brazilian Theatre Critics Association for his interpretation of Cervantes/Quixote in Man of La Mancha in 2014. Han spent his childhood years in São Paulo, Rio de Janeiro, and Espírito Santo, Brazil. During his childhood, his favorite activities included swimming and surfing in the ocean, aspiring to be a swimmer.

At age nine, Han moved to Seoul, South Korea, with his mother and grandmother in November 2005. When he began elementary school in Korea, he had no prior knowledge of the Korean language. Always interested in sports, he took up kendo in third grade and continued until seventh grade. In 2007, he entered a kendo competition in Seoul and won third place.

The first time he encountered a live drum performance was while he was in middle school at a church concert. Han describes the attraction towards the drum sound as falling in love at first sight; he recalls sensing his heartbeats beating harder to the bass drum sound. He started playing the drums in 2010, and he is mostly self-taught. His passion for the drums propelled him to practice eight to ten hours a day. The first song he practiced was "21 Guns" by Green Day.

== Career ==
=== 2012–2020: Career beginnings and About U ===
After playing the drums for a few years, Han participated in numerous band competitions with his high school band. He was scouted as a K-pop idol trainee at a local high school band competition in 2012 by Corona X Entertainment. The management formed the band, About U – Han as a drummer – with three other members, including a guitarist, bassist, and a vocalist. In between playing his drums for About U, he had the opportunity to play a role in Man of La Mancha in Rio de Janeiro, Brazil, in 2018, and credits his father as an inspiration to be a musical theatre actor in the future. The band was active in the underground music scene for a few years and released the single "Who took my candy" (Korean: 내 사탕 누가 먹었어; RR: Nae satang nuga meogeosseo) on February 20, 2020. On the same day, Han made his national television debut as a drummer of About U on M Countdown of Mnet. After appearing on a series of music shows on major network television, his management informed him that he was banned from appearing on SBS due to breaking his drum stick during a performance on a live TV show, Inkigayo, on March 8, 2020. This incident was deemed too violent and aggressive for younger viewers. Corona X Entertainment immediately dismissed him from the band, and cut ties with him, reasoning he was no longer fit to be part of the band.

=== 2020–present: YouTube and legal issues ===
Right after he parted his ways with his management company, Han created his YouTube channel, then called Victor the Drummer, which subsequently changed to the current name, Victor the Drum Destroyer, per suggestions from his fans. He uploaded his first videos on March 10, 2020, which explains how his management company, where he was a K-pop idol trainee for eight years, fired him only three weeks after his TV debut for breaking his drumstick during a live performance. This video soon went viral in South Korea. With daily uploads of drum covers and his sympathetic stories, Victor the Drum Destroyer became one of the fastest-growing South Korean YouTube channels in March 2020. His main contents consist of drum covers, vlog, ASMR, mukbang, and comedy/satire. Answering how he chooses which songs to cover, he replies that he is disinterested in the songs with heavy drum beats. Instead, he prefers the songs with minimal drum beats allowing him to add his interpretation of each song. He also mentioned that upon the filming of drum covers, there is no prior rehearsal. With growing popularity, he started appearing as a guest on radio shows and talk shows on television. On March 12, 2020, an anonymous author posted a story on FM Korea, a South Korean online community, claiming that the reason for his dismissal from About U was because of his violent behavior threatening a female stylist with scissors by cutting his wrist before the Inkigayo performance on SBS. The author soon took down the story. On March 13, 2020, in lieu of refuting the rumor, Han uploaded a drum cover of "On" by BTS shirtless, bearing his upper body and wrist with no scar.

In July, Corona X Entertainment rebutted Han's claim on how he was fired from the company and got kicked out of the band, claiming that it was not due to breaking a drumstick but due to his unpredictable and violent behaviors. They also asserted that he started the YouTube channel on his own without consulting his management while still being under a contract insisting that he was not fired from the company. The company concurred with the claim mentioned on FM Korea that Han threatened a female stylist with scissors by cutting his wrist before going on the Inkigayo stage on March 8, 2020. They filed a defamation case against him for falsely spreading the rumor about the management company.

On July 13, 2020, Han uploaded a video explaining his mental health history with depression and anxiety disorder, accompanied by self-harm, clarifying all the claims by his company were false. He also affirmed the unfair and bullying treatment he had to endure with Corona X Entertainment, which only exacerbated his condition. In an interview, Han rebutted that the company owed him money and was verbally abusive with a constant threat. Also, he was bullied on his physical appearance.

A few days after a guest appearance on Radio Star, Han was notified with a court date for a trial with Corona X Entertainment requesting to stop all his entertainment activities on all accounts for the next seven years, equating to the duration of his contract. He was given a ten-day notification. With such short notice, scrambling to prepare for the trial, he uploaded a video asking for donations for the lawyer fee.

On October 6, 2020, Han announced that he won the case against Corona X Entertainment on a YouTube live stream, which officially terminated all his ties with the former company. He later informed in a video that the complexity of the contract with his former company made the case rather unusual for the industry standard for a few reasons. There was a single contract for the entire band of About U, not four individual contracts for each member, and there were two other parent companies involved besides Corona X Entertainment. The court document concluded that it was unlikely for both parties to restore their mutual trust in one another, which ultimately precludes cooperative management works for Han; continuing the contractual relationship would only hinder the artist's rights and freedoms.

On July 31, 2021, it was reported that AMP Music, the parent company of Corona X Entertainment, won the appeal against Han. The Seoul Central District Court sided with the AMP Music, stating that Han will not be allowed any entertainment activities without the permission of the management. Subsequently, all of Han's social networking accounts, including his popular YouTube channel, Instagram account have been shut.

== Artistry ==
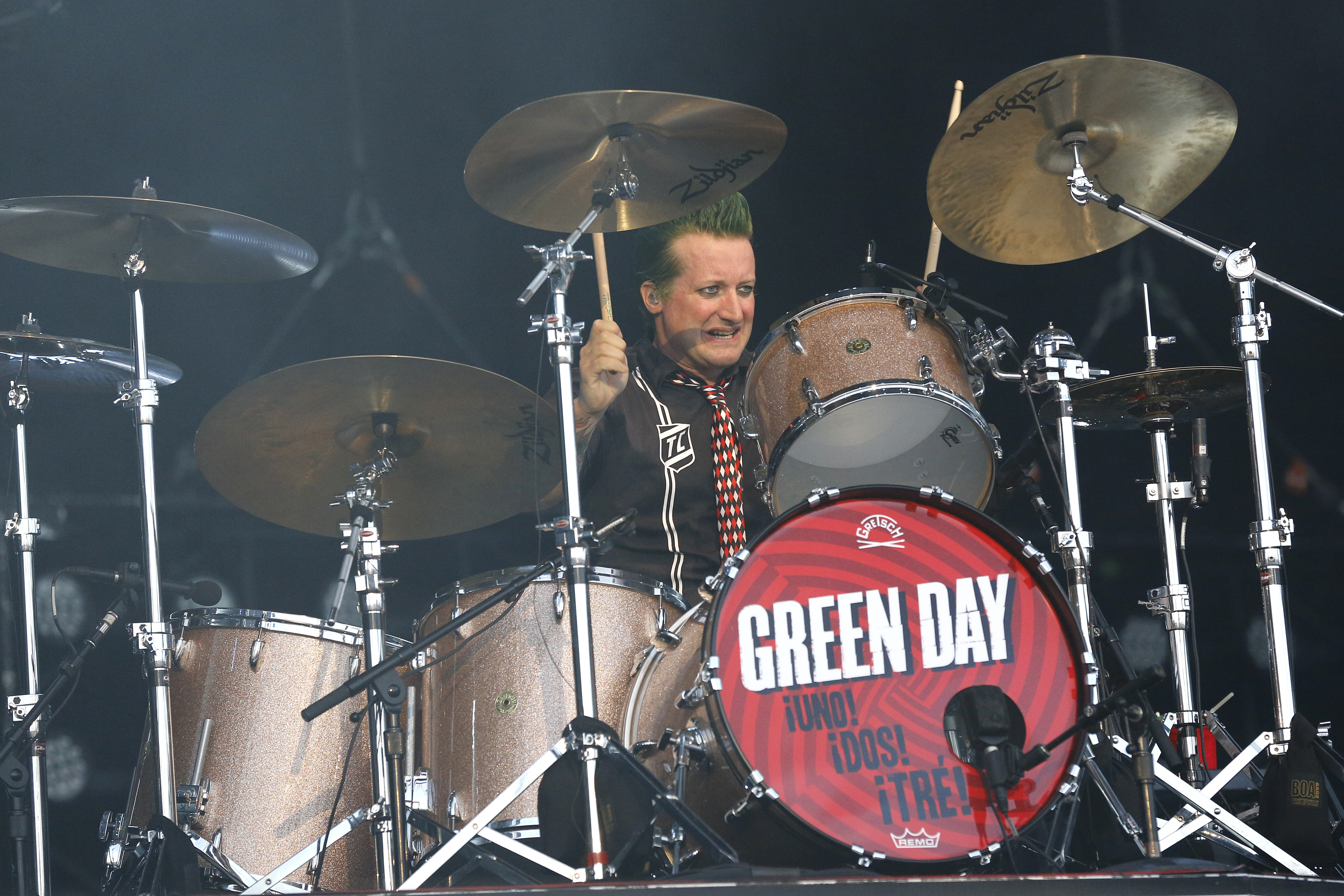
Tré Cool is one of Han's biggest drumming influences

=== Influences ===
Han has stated numerous times that his biggest influences on drumming are Tré Cool from Green Day and John Bonham from Led Zeppelin. He was always more drawn to the performance aspect of drumming rather than the technicality of it.

John Bonham carried the history of hard rock. I admire the pioneering ethos he embodied, and I'd love to resemble Tré Cool's expressions that exude confidence and fearlessness weaponized by his nonchalance.

— Han on his drummer idols

== Endorsements ==
In October 2020, Han became the first collaborator with LG's Hello Mobile campaign titled "Breaking the Prejudice," targeting younger consumers in their 20s and 30s. On October 14, 2020, LG released a 30-second and a one-minute ads on their YouTube channel featuring Han. LG states that Han's pure talents and individuality as a drummer can easily be negligible due to his unique outward appearance and former status as an idol. This quality about him makes him the representative figure in breaking all the stereotypes, which the company hopes would correlate with the characteristics of the Hello Mobile service.

== Personal life ==
Han currently resides in Seoul and is a naturalized South Korean citizen. Because he is often asked about his racial background, he coined the term KoBrazilian for others to easily remember his mixed racial identity. Growing up as a multiracial preteen in South Korea, a country lacking racial diversity, he often became a target of bullying and had self-esteem issues. However, now he considers his identity as one of his greatest assets. During his time at Corona X Entertainment, management and industry personnel continuously suggested him to undergo plastic surgery on his chin, which he opposed believing that he did not want to limit his looks and beauty to a particular culture and time.

He frequently uses colored contact lenses; his natural eye color is light brown.

Han is a polyglot, fluent in Portuguese, English, Korean, and Japanese, and he's currently learning Chinese.

=== Health ===
Han has openly discussed the importance of mental health and revealed that he has suffered from depression, anxiety disorder, and panic attacks since high school, which progressively worsened until his debut in early 2020. He began self-harm in high school, during his Corona X Entertainment years. He used self-harm as a form of relief from his anxiety and panic attacks, noting that seeing blood assured him of life. None of the self-injury was deep enough to leave him any scars on his body. In an interview, Han clarified that he stopped self-harm when he started his YouTube channel in March 2020 and attributes his better health to professional help from his doctors and newfound fan supports.

== Discography ==
=== As a drummer of About U ===
- "쎄한데 Sse Han De" ("It's nasty"), AboutU 1st EP (February 24, 2018)
- "Party Tonight", AboutU 2nd Single (June 2, 2018)
- "It's over", AboutU 3rd Single (July 16, 2018)
- "울어도 돼" ("Ureodo Dwae"; "You Can Cry") (September 2, 2018)
- 이별이란 건가봐, EP (Ibyeoriran Geon-gabwa; Love is…) (October 30, 2018)
- "Let Her Go" (November 22, 2018)
- Where I am, EP (January 12, 2019)
- Sunrise Bird, EP (March 3, 2019)
- "못참겠어" ("Motchamgesseo"; "can't stop loving you") (April 9, 2019)
- Top 2 Toe, EP (June 6, 2019)
- Candy Addicted, EP (February 20, 2020)
