= Lee Ji-hye (taekwondo) =

South Korean taekwondo practitioner

Personal information
- Nationality: South Korean
- Born: 21 October 1982 (age 43)

Sport
- Sport: Taekwondo
Medal record
Representing South Korea
Women's taekwondo
World Championships
| Gold medal – first place | 2003 Garmisch-Partenkirchen | Flyweight |
Asian Championships
| Silver medal – second place | 2004 Seongnam | Flyweight |

Lee Ji-hye (born 21 October 1982) is a South Korean flyweight taekwondo practitioner who won a gold medal at the 2003 World Taekwondo Championships in Garmisch-Partenkirchen and a silver medal at the 2004 Asian Taekwondo Championships in Seongnam.
