= JK Kim Dong-wook =

South Korean singer

JK Kim Dong Uk
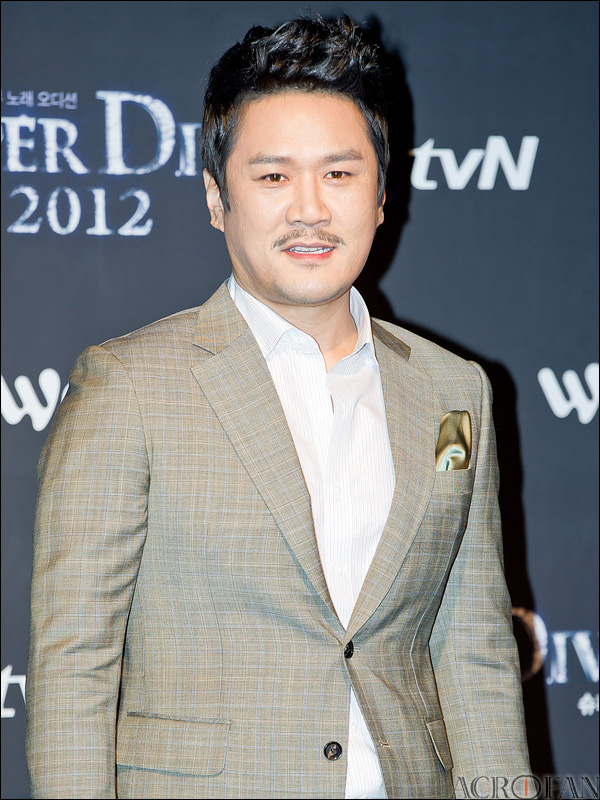
- JK Kim in 2012

Background information
- Born: December 11, 1975 (age 50); South Korea
- Genres: R&B, jazz
- Occupations: Singer; songwriter; MC; musical actor
- Years active: 2001–present

Korean name
- Hangul: 김동욱
- RR: Gim Donguk
- MR: Kim Tonguk

JK Kim Dong Uk (Korean: JK 김동욱; born December 11, 1975) is a South Korean singer, musical actor and the MC of music program Dran.

== Education ==
JK Kim graduated with a degee in Jazz vocal at the Humber College, Canada.

== Political speech ==
JK Kim emigrated to Canada in high school, and now holds Canadian citizenship and lives in South Korea. His public support of president Yoon Suk Yeol after Yoon was criminally charged with insurrection generated a complaint that JK Kim violated the Immigration Act, which government officials investigated. Article 17, Clause 2 prohibits foreigners living in South Korea from political activity, and Article 46, Clause 8 lists deportation as a possible consequence. The law is being challenged as unconstitutional.

== Discography ==
=== Studio albums ===
| Title | Album details | Peak chart positions | | Sales |
| Title | Album details | KOR (RIAK) | KOR (Circle) | Sales |
|---|---|---|---|---|
| Lifesentence | Released: May 18, 2002; Label: Seoul Entertainment | 10 | — | KOR: 106,052 |
| Multiplepersonalize | Released: August 5, 2003; Label: Seoul Entertainment | 15 | — | KOR: 44,758 |
| Memories In Heaven | Released: May 10, 2004; Label: Seoul Entertainment | 10 | — | KOR: 45,688 |
| Acousti.K | Released: September 27, 2005; Label: Seoul Entertainment | 13 | — | KOR: 15,316 |
| Strange Heaven (낯선 천국) | Released: July 16, 2007; Label: Manine Media | — | — | |
| Beautifool | Released: April 8, 2013; Label: Mulgogi Music | x | 20 | KOR: 1,310 |
| The Book of John Part 2: 끝의 시작 | Released: February 21, 2023; Label: Wepublic | x | — | |
"—" denotes release did not chart. "x" denotes discontinued chart.

=== Extended plays ===
| Title | Album details | Peak chart positions |
| Title | Album details | KOR (Circle) |
|---|---|---|
| The Book of John Part 1 | Released: April 9, 2018; Label: Wepublic | 87 |
