= List of Video Star episodes =

This is a list of episodes of the South Korean talk show Video Star (Korean: 비디오스타) which is currently hosted by Kim Sook, Park Na-rae, Park So-hyun and Sandara Park. It airs on MBC Plus every Tuesday at 20:30 (KST) starting July 12, 2016.

== Episodes ==
=== 2016 ===
List of episodes (2016)

List of episodes (2016)
Episode	Broadcast Date	Guests	Notes
1	July 12, 2016	Kim Il-jung, Lee Chun-soo, Dong Hyun-bae, Jung Chae-yeon	
2	July 19, 2016	Joo Woo-jae, ₩uNo, Kangnam, Lee Sang-jun	
3	July 26, 2016	Kim Jong-seo, Lee Sang-min, Danny Ahn, Ren (NU'EST)	
4	August 2, 2016	Jeong Jinwoon, Lee Soo-min, Seo Yu-ri, Lee Jin-ho	
5	August 9, 2016	Kim Jun-hyun, Moon Ji-ae, Kisum, Boom	
6	August 16, 2016	Kyungri (Nine Muses), Kim Jun-ho, Park Jae-min, LuA (Badkiz)	
7	August 23, 2016	Kim Min-jae, Seong Min-jae (Sonamoo), Park Seong-jin, Hong Seok-cheon	
8	August 30, 2016	Kim Ga-yeon, Eli Kim, Dana, Kwak Jeong-eun	
9	September 6, 2016	Kang Ye-bin, Kim Yu-bin (Wonder Girls), Yang Jung-won, Song Hae-na	
10	September 13, 2016	Kang Ye-bin, Kim Yu-bin (Wonder Girls), Yang Jung-won, Song Hae-na	
11	September 20, 2016	Kwon Oh-joong, Hong Won-ki, Lee Byung-hun, Bong Man-dae	
12	September 27, 2016	Lee Yoo-ri, Park Ha-na, Choi Yeong-hwan, Lee Yeon-doo	
13	October 4, 2016	Ji Joo-yeon, Shin A-young, Goo Sae-bom, Oliver Jang, Hwang Jae-geun	
14	October 11, 2016		Cao Lu's last episode as host.
15	October 18, 2016	Bada, Stephanie, Solbi, Solbin (Laboum)	Jun Hyo-seong's first episode as host
16	October 25, 2016	Bada, Stephanie, Solbi, Solbin (Laboum)	
17	November 1, 2016	Jeong Ga-eun, Lee Hyun-yi, Lee Young-eun, Kim Mi-ryeo	
18	November 8, 2016	Kim Kang-hyun, Park Jin-joo, Nam Bo-ra, Yoon Jong-hoon	
19	November 15, 2016	Sunwoo Sun, Shin Soo-ji, Lee Tae-il, Lee Yong-jin	
20	November 22, 2016	Koyote (Shin Ji, Kim Jong-min, Bbaek Ga), Noh Yoo-min (NRG)	
21	November 29, 2016	Tony An, Son Ho-young, Sleepy, DinDin, MC Gree	
22	December 6, 2016	Seo Ha-joon, Woo Ji-won, KCM, Rowoon (SF9), Jang Youngran	
23	December 13, 2016	Lee Soo-wan, Ahn Hye-kyung, Yang Mi-ra, Kim Jin	
24	December 20, 2016	Son Tae-young, Kim Ji-min, Heo Kyung-hwan, Jo Woo-jong	
25	December 27, 2016	Beenzino, Shimmy Twice, 2AM (Lim Seul-ong, Jeong Jinwoon)	

=== 2017 ===
List of episodes (2017)

List of episodes (2017)
Episode	Broadcast Date	Guests	Notes
26	January 3, 2017	Song Eun-i, Hwangbo, Ivy, Narsha (Brown Eyed Girls)	
27	January 10, 2017	Koo Jun-yup, Kim Hyung-jun (SS301), Jung Dae-hyun (B.A.P), Kang Tae-oh (5urprise), Kim Dae-hee	
28	January 17, 2017	Park Si-hwan, Thunder, Seol Ha-yoon, Ren (NU'EST), Jo Seung-youn (Uniq), B.I.G (Gunmin, Benji), Ami (WANNA.B), Anda, Monika (Badkiz), Kwak Seung-nam	Winter Vacation Special: 2017 WARA
29	January 24, 2017	Song Jae-hee, Kim Jin-woo, Lee Min-woong, Shin Yu	Joo Woo-jong filled in as Special MC for Park Na-rae.
30	January 31, 2017	Kim Hyeong-seok, Hwayobi, Kim Yoon-ah, Na Yoon-kwon	
31	February 7, 2017	Shindong, Kwon Hyuk-soo, Choi Woong, Choi Seong-joon, Shin Ji-hoon	
32	February 14, 2017	Hong Jin-young‚ Tei, Sung Hyuk, Leo (VIXX), Choi Byung-chan (Victon)	Shindong filled in as special MC.
33	February 21, 2017	Kim Soo-yong, Chun Myung-hoon, Kim Yoon-ji, Park Si-hwan, Tim	Shindong filled in as special MC.
34	February 28, 2017	Dynamic Duo, Rhythm Power	
35	March 7, 2017	Jo Hye-ryun, Chunja, Vicky, Taeha (Berry Good)	
36	March 14, 2017	Kim Hyung-kyu, Kim Jae-woo, Yang Se-chan, Hwang Tae-kyung (Narsha's husband)	Park Jin-hee filled in as a special MC.
37	March 21, 2017	Ryu Tae-joon, Kwak Hee-sung, Jasper Cho, Lee Myung-hoon	Solbin (Laboum) & Park Jin-hee filled in as special MCs.
38	March 28, 2017	Yang Joon-hyuk, Lee Jong-beom, Park Ki-ryang, Jo Dong-hyuk, Takuya Terada	Song Eun-i filled in as a special MC.
39	April 4, 2017	Jang Yun-jeong, Jiwoni, Jo Jung-min, Yoon Soo-hyun, So Yu-mi	Special appearance by Nam Jin.
40	April 11, 2017	Joon Park, Lee Tae-im, Yang Ho-seok, Rui (H.U.B), Kim Dong-sung	Oh Jeong-yeon filled in as a special MC.
41	April 18, 2017	Kim Hyun-jung, Kim Hyun-jung (Space A), Kim Hyun-jung (comedian), Vivian Cha, Alex Chu (Clazziquai	
42	April 25, 2017	Hong Hyun-hee, Oh Na-mi, Kim Young-hee, Lee Eun-hyung, Maeng Seung-ji	
43	May 2, 2017	Kim Heung-gook, Lee Bong-won, Kim Min-kyu, Yoon Yong-jun, Oh Seung-hwan	
44	May 9, 2017	Cha Tae-hyun & Cha Jae-wan (Cha Tae-hyun's father), Jun Jin & Charlie Park (Jun Jin's father), Yein Melody Day & Ahn Ji-hwan (Yein's father), Jeon So-mi & Matthew Douma (So-mi's father), Kim Soo-chan	Father's Day Special
45	May 16, 2017	Jae Hee, Park Hye-kyung, Kim Woo-ri, Geum Jan-di, Kim Ji-sook	
46	May 23, 2017	Yoon Hyun-sook, Jung Saem-mool, Park Tam-hee, Kahi	
47	May 30, 2017	Lee Jae-eun, Jang Dong-min, Hong Jin-ho, Kwak Hyun-hwa, Shin Bo-ra	
48	June 6, 2017	Kim Jung-mon, Park Sang-min, Kwon Seon-gook, Kim Kyung-ho, Jung Jae-wook, Jo Sung-mo	
49	June 13, 2017	Kim Jung-mon, Park Sang-min, Kwon Seon-gook, Kim Kyung-ho, Jung Jae-wook, Jo Sung-mo	
50	June 20, 2017	Ahn Moon-sook, Jang Do-yeon, Crown J, Yoo Jae-hwan, Soobin (Cosmic Girls)	
51	June 27, 2017	Chae Yeon, Lee Ji-hye, Sayuri Fujita, Cao Lu, Hong Yoon-hwa	
52	July 4, 2017	Joo Woo-jae, Kang Chul-woong, Jo Min-ho, Lee Chul-woo	
53	July 11, 2017	Park Soo-hong, Don Spike, Kang Min-hyuk, DinDin, Parc Jae-jung	
54	July 18, 2017	Kim Yeon-ja, Seo Ha-joon, Marco (actor), Kim Kwang-min	
55	July 25, 2017	Jung Sun-hee, Kim Hyo-jin, Choi Eun-kyung, Ahn Sun-young, Kim Jung-min	
56	August 1, 2017	Harisu, Gil Gun, Kim Ki-soo, Nancy Lang, Jang Moon-bok	
57	August 8, 2017	Shim Mina, Ryu Philip, Lee Pa-ni, Seo Sung-min (Lee Pa-ni's husband)	
58	August 15, 2017	Park Kyung-lim, Lee Soo-young, Jung Jung-ah, Park Seul-gi, Ha Ji-hye	
59	August 22, 2017	Pyo Chang-won, Lee Sa-gang, Nam Goong-in, Dr.Simpson	
60	August 29, 2017	Jaehyo (Block B), CNU, Gongchan (B1A4), Kim Min-young, Yezi, Kim Chung-ha	
61	September 5, 2017	Clara Lee, Kim Mi-yeon, Kim Sang-hyuk, Maktub, Hwang Bo-mi	
62	September 12, 2017	Yoo Seo-jin, Kim Jun-hee, Kim Hye-jin, Euaerin	
63	September 19, 2017	Kim Dong-hyun, Shim Eun-jin, Subin (Dal Shabet), GFriend (Yerin & Yuju),	
64	September 26, 2017	Outsider, Shin Dong-ho, Lee Moo-song, Kim Gi-wook	
65	October 3, 2017	Lee Je-seok, Choi Hyeon-woo, Yoo Byung-jae, Jeong Da-rae	
66	October 10, 2017	Han Hye-yeon, Song Kyung-ah, Lee Hye-jung, Jeong Hyeok, Kim Chung-jae	
67	October 17, 2017	Lee Seung-chul, Park Seon-ju, Kim Ha-neul, Aancod	
68	October 24, 2017	Song Eun-i, Jung Si-ah, Shin Bong-sun, Ahn Young-mi, Hwangbo, Baek Bo-ram, Oh Seung-eun	MBC Every 1 10th Anniversary Special: We Are Infinite Girls; Special appearances by Park Seul-gi & Ha Ji-hye
69	October 31, 2017	Song Eun-i, Jung Si-ah, Shin Bong-sun, Ahn Young-mi, Hwangbo, Baek Bo-ram, Oh Seung-eun	MBC Every 1 10th Anniversary Special: We Are Infinite Girls; Special appearances by Park Seul-gi & Ha Ji-hye
70	November 7, 2017	Choi Jung-won, Lee Se-chang, Kim Hyun-chul, Lee Sang-hun	
71	November 14, 2017	Cho Yeon-woo, Im Hyung-joon, Kim Mkin-kyu, Min Woo-hyuk, SeungHee	
72	November 21, 2017	Rhymer, Kiggen, Hanhae, Im Yeong-min, Kim Dong-hyeon	
73	November 28, 2017	Han Eun-jung, Go Eun-ah, Oh In-hye, Seol In-ah, Shownu (Monsta X)	
74	December 5, 2017	Jang Hang-jun, Choi Min-yong, Kim Dong-wan, Mina Fujii	
75	December 12, 2017	Haengju, Nucksal, Double K, Junoflo, Microdot	
76	December 19, 2017	Lena Park, Junggigo, Ali, Han Dong-geun, Samuel	
77	December 26, 2017	Wheesung, K.Will, Lim Jeong-hee, Yangpa	

=== 2018 ===
List of episodes (2018)

List of episodes (2018)
Episode	Broadcast Date	Guests	Notes
78	January 2, 2018	Jung Doo-hong, Kang Sung-tae, Park Sung-joon, Jang Cheon, Park Jong-bok	
79	January 9, 2018	Kang Sung-hoon, Yoon Jung-soo, Kang Kyun-sung, Han Jae-suk	
80	January 16, 2018	Lee Kye-in, Ji Sang-ryeol, Chunja, Kim Sae-rom, Kim Sung-il	
81	January 23, 2018	Lee Jae-yong, Jung Yeon-ju, Kim Jae-hwa, Miryo, ASOL	
82	January 30, 2018	Hyun Jin-young, Kim Kyung-sik, Park Hyun-bin, Julien Kang, Hur Youngji	
83	February 6, 2018	Lee Dong-jun, Im Tae-kyung, Yoon Hyung-bin, Kim Ho-young	
84	February 13, 2018	Kang Sung-jin, Shoo, Kim Hye-yeon, Park Ji-heon	
85	February 20, 2018	Im Chang-jung, Kim Chang-yeol, Kim Seong-su, Kim Min-kyu	
86	February 27, 2018	Kim Poong, Joo Ho-min, Lee Mal-nyeon, Tamibu	
87	March 6, 2018	NRG	
88	March 13, 2018	Jung Sung-hwa‚ Kim Ho-young, Choi Jae-rim, Park Gang-hyun	Narsha (Brown Eyed Girls) filled in as a special MC.
89	March 20, 2018	Yoo Se-yoon, Shindong, Muzie, Jo Jung-chi, Jang Dae-hyun	
90	March 27, 2018		Jun Hyo-seong's last episode as a host.
Season 2 (Episode 91–present)
91	May 1, 2018	Im Ha-ryong, Jeon Yu-seong, Lee Hong-ryeol, Lee Seong-mi	Sunny's first episode as a host.
92	May 8, 2018	Park Ye-eun, Hwanhee, Crush, Sunwoo Jung-a	
93	May 15, 2018	Alberto Mondi, Daniel Lindemann, Guillaume Patry, Grace Lee, Moon Gabi	
94	May 22, 2018	Ham So-won, Ji So-yeon, An So-mi, Lee Eun-hye	
95	May 29, 2018	Kim Soo-mi, Im Ye-jin, Park Jun-geum, Yun Yeoung-mi, Yoon Jong-hoon	
96	June 5, 2018	Jungyup, Kim Seol-jin, Michael K. Lee, Han Ji-sang	
97	June 12, 2018	Lee Sang-min, Kim Il-wong, Park Ji-woo, Ravi	
98	June 19, 2018	Jung Dong-ha, Kang Ju-eun (Miss Korea), Nam Tae-hyun, Austin Kang (chef)	Yura (Girl's Day) filled in as a special MC.
99	June 26, 2018	Edward Young-min Kwon, Oh Se-deuk, Choi Hyun-seok, Kim Hyung-seok, Mihal Ashminov	Boom and Yura (Girl's Day) filled in as special MCs.
100	July 3, 2018	Swings, Lim Bo-ra, G.O, Choi Ye-seul	
101	July 10, 2018	Ha Chun-hwa, Jeon Yeong-rok, Chae Ri-na, DinDin	
102	July 17, 2018	Kim Won-hee, Sung Dae-hyun (R.ef), Hong Kyung-min, Solbi	
103	July 24, 2018	Lee Jong-hyuk, Kim Seon-kyeong, Hong Ji-min, Kang Dong-ho	
104	July 31, 2018	L.Joe, Yang Ji-won, Go Woo-ri, Yoo So-young, Lee Tae-hui	
105	August 7, 2018	Haha, Byul, Skull, Zizo	
106	August 14, 2018	Nam Hee-suk, Kim Soo-young, Yoo Byung-jae, Yoo Gyoo-sun, Moon Sang-hoon	
107	August 21, 2018	Kim Jun-ho, Kim Dae-hui, Byun Gi-su, Kim Ji-min	
108	August 28, 2018	Kim Sook, Park Na-rae, Park So-hyun, Sunny	Muzie, Jang Dong-min, Tak Jae-hoon and Shindong (Super Junior) filled in as special MCs, while the usual MCs acted as guests.
109	September 4, 2018	Ha Hyun-woo, Joo Hyun-mi, Tei, Na Yoon-kwon	
110	September 11, 2018	Park Joon-seok, Choi Je-woo, Ko Jae-geun (Y2K), Yoo Ho-seok (Click-B)	
111	September 18, 2018	Seo Hyun-jin, Kim Joo-hee, Choi Song-hyun, Gong Seo-yeong	
112	September 25, 2018	Park Sang-cheol, Park Gyu-yoon, Park Seo-jin, Hyunsang, Lee Seon-gyu	
113	October 2, 2018	Park Kyung-lim, Kim Kyung-seon, San E, Leo	
114	October 9, 2018	Jung Sang-hoon, Kim In-kwon, Son Dam-bi, Kim Sung-cheol	Nam Tae-hyun filled in as special MC.
115	October 16, 2018	iKON	
116	October 23, 2018	Woo Ji-won, J Black, Shawn, Kim Sang-gyun	Moon Gabi filled in as special MC.
117	October 30, 2018	Hwang Seok-jeong, Narsha, Sayuri Fujita, Cheetah	Kisum filled in as special MC.

=== 2019 ===
List of episodes (2019)

List of episodes (2019)
Episode	Broadcast Date	Guests	Notes
125	January 1, 2019	Lee Sa-kang, Lon, Kim In-seok, Yoon Sung-ho	Shin A-young filled in as special MC.
126	January 8, 2019	Kim Wan-sun, Seven, Lee Chang-sub (BtoB), Park Kyung	Sandara Park filled in as special MC.
127	January 15, 2019	Lee Jang-woo, Ahn Se-ha, Lim Ju-eun, Im Kang-sung	So-hee (Elris) filled in as special MC.
128	January 22, 2019	Moon Se-yoon, Seo Hye-lin, Choi Seong-min, Lee Chae-young	Sandara Park filled in as special MC.
129	January 29, 2019	Tiger JK, Yoon Mi-rae, Bizzy, Sleepy	Sandara Park filled in as special MC.
130	February 5, 2019	Tony An, Kim Eana, Hwangbo, JeA	Sandara Park's first episode as host.
131	February 12, 2019	Jinwoo, Mir. Thunder, LE (EXID), DinDin	Lee Hwi-jae filled in as a special MC.
132	February 19, 2019	CNU, Feeldog, L.Joe, Park Sun-ho	
133	February 26, 2019	Park Joon-geum, Lee Hye-jung, Kim Ji-hyun, Chae Ri-na	
134	March 5, 2019	Park Jae-min, Shin Yi, Hyun Young, Chae Eun-jeong, Lady Jane	Kim Il-jong filled in as a special MC.
135	March 12, 2019	Geum Bo-ra, Kim Hyung-min, Jo An, Jae Hee	
136	March 19, 2019	Ahn Young-mi, Heo An-na, Shin Ki-roo, Lee Yong-jin, Han Yoon-seo	
137	March 26, 2019	Park Jun-gyu, Hong Rok-ki, Pyo In-bong, Chu Sang-mi, Seo Hae-won	
138	April 2, 2019	None.	Highlights - Parts 1 & 2
139	April 9, 2010	None.	Highlights - Parts 1 & 2
140	April 16, 2019	Shin Hyo-bum, So Chan-whee, Park Ye-eun, Suran	
141	April 23, 2019	Ryu Philip, Jo Hye-ryun, Kim Kyung-ran, Park Seul-gi, Jeong Ae-yeon	
142	April 30, 2019	Super Junior (Eunhyuk, Ryeowook, Ji Byeong-su, Kim Chil-doo, Kim Young-ok	
143	May 7, 2019	Lee Soo-jin, Park Yong-woo, Kim Jong-myeong, Yang Jae-woong, Kim Do-kyun	
144	May 14, 2019	Koyote, Ailee	
145	May 21, 2019	Hwang Bo-ra, Hwang Chan-sung, Jeong Yi-rang, Lee Yoo-joon, Shin Seung-hwan	
146	May 28, 2019	Song Ga-in, Hongja, Jeong Da-kyung, Kim Na-hee	
147	June 4, 2019	Kim Yeon-ja, Song Ga-in, Hongja, Jeong Da-kyung, Kim Na-hee	
148	June 11, 2019	Hong Hyun-joo, Kwak Jeong-eun, Seo Yu-ri, Kang Seong-min, U-Kwon	
149	June 18, 2019	Nam Woo-hyun, Ken, Nam Tae-hyun, Linzy	
150	June 25, 2019	Yoo Nan-hee, Dong Ji-hyun, Lee Min-woong, Lee Chan-seok, Kim Sae-rom	
151	July 2, 2019	Park Bom, Yubin, Jeon Ji-yoon, Song Ji-eun	
152	July 9, 2019	Kim Jang-hoon, Bruno Bruni Jr., Bo Cheng, Lim Eun-kyung	
153	July 16, 2019	Jeon Soo-kyung, Song Jin-woo, Jang Jin-hee, Jun	
154	July 23, 2019	Lee Hyun-woo, Park Jun-myeon, Han Ji-sang, Min Woo-hyuk, Kim Ji-woo	Hwang Bo-ra filled in as a special MC.
155	July 30, 2019	Bang Mi, Lee Si-won, Yang Chi-seung, ssin, Son Kyeong-i	
156	August 6, 2019	Jeong Jun-ha, Tei, Kang Hong-seok, Choi Jae-rim	
157	August 13, 2019	Jang Yoon-jeong, Lee Ji-ahn, Kwon Min-jeong, Kim Se-yeon	
158	August 20, 2019	Sechs Kies/J-Walk (Jang Su-won & Kim Jae-duck), SS501 (Heo Young-saeng & Park Jung-min)	
159	August 27, 2019	Heo Cham, Jo Seong-hwan, Rich, Lee Sang-mi, Jeong Cheol-kyu	
160	September 3, 2019	Shin Ji-ho, Henry Lau, Austin Kang, Lim Heon-il	
161	September 10, 2019	Lee Soon-jae, Shin Goo, Son Sook, Kang Sung-jin	
162	September 17, 2019	Wink, Venus	
163	September 24, 2019	Kisum, Hyosung, CNU, Eunkwang	Cao Lu filled in as a special MC.
164	October 1, 2019	Kim Il-jong, CNU, Eunkwang, Choim, Weki Meki, Younggi	Hyosung filled in as a special MC.
165	October 8, 2019	Im Won-hee, Lee Cheol-min, Kim Kang-hyun, Cha Chi-eung	
166	October 15, 2019	Um Ki-joon, Yoo Jun-sang, Min Young-ki, Kim Beop-rae	
167	October 22, 2019	Kan Mi-youn, Park Eun-ji, Shin Joo-ah, Lee Hye-joo	. Hwang Bo-ra filled in as a special MC.
168	October 29, 2019	Brown Eyed Girls	Kim Eana filled in as a special MC.
