= Hwang Chi-yeul filmography =

South Korean entertainer (born 1982)

Hwang Chi-yeul (born 3 December 1982) is a South Korean singer, TV show host of Immortal Songs 2, and former competitor of I Am a Singer (season 4) (placed 3rd in the finals). He made his official debut in 2007, releasing a digital single album, Chi Yeul

== TV shows ==
Year	Title	Episode	Notes
2017	The 31st Golden Disc Awards	Day 1, Live broadcast: 13 January 2017	With cohosts Seohyun, Jung Yong-hwa The 2nd exhibition center of KINTEX in Ilsan
2017–2018	Immortal Songs 2	Ep285–354 See table Immortal Songs2 above	With co-hosts Shin Dong-yup, Jung Jae-hyung, Moon Hee-Joon
2017–2018	The Unit	Ep1-28	With co-hosts Rain, Tae Min, Hyuna, Jo Hyun Ah, San E
2020	Player 7 Season 2	Ep1-	With co-cast members Lee Soo-geun, Kim Dong-hyun, Hwang Je-sung, Lee Yong-jin, Lee Jin-ho, Lee Yi-kyung, Jung Hyuk
2022	Avatar Singer	Judge	
2022–2023	Cabin Crew	New employee	

=== I Am a Singer season four ===
Year	Date	Episode	Title of Song	Originally Sung	Place
2016	15 January	Ep1	'That person' '그 사람'	A soundtrack of 'Bread, Love and Dreams', originally sung by Lee Seung-chul in 2010	2nd place among eight singers
2016	22 January	Ep2	'From the beginning until now' '처음부터 지금까지 '	A soundtrack of 'Winter Sonata', originally sung by Ryu in 2002	2nd place among eight singers
2016	29 January	Ep3	'Yi Lu Shang You Ni' '一路上有你'	Originally sung by Jacky Cheung in 1992	3rd place among seven singers
2016	5 February	Ep4	Bang Bang Bang	Originally sung by Big Bang in 2015	1st place among seven singers. Hwang also took first place in 'The Internal voting' that is voted by artists, winning the Golden Wand.
2016	12 February	Ep5	Silence (默), a soundtrack of a Chinese movie, You are my sunshine	Originally sung by Na Ying in 2015	6th place among seven singers
2016	19 February	Ep6	Confession (고해)	Originally sung by Yim Jae-beom in 1998	3rd place among seven singers
2016	26 February	Ep7	Eternity of a single person(一個人的天荒地老)	Originally sung by Phil Chang	4th place among seven singers
2016	4 March	Ep8	Honey,	Originally sung by Park Jin Young	1st place among seven singers
2016	11 March	Ep9	You are only in a place slightly higher than I, (나보다 조금 더 높은 곳에 니가 있을 뿐)	Originally sung by Shin Seung-hun in 2001	4th place among seven singers
2016	18 March	Ep10	Change me, (改變自己), Fantastic Baby (Big Bang), Uptown Funk (Mark Ronson, feat Bruno Mars)	Originally sung by Wang Leehom in 2007	1st place among seven singers
2016	25 March	Ep11	Like being shot by a bullet, (총 맞은 것처럼)	Originally sung by Baek Ji-young in 2008	4th place among seven singers and made to the final taking 1st overall in Ep10&11
2016	8 April	Ep13 (The final round)	'You are my everything,' (for duo performance, performed with Gummy), 'Queen, (王妃) + Sorry Sorry' (for solo performance)	'You are my everything', a soundtrack of Descendants of the Sun, originally sung by Gummy in 2016, 'Queen', originally sung by Jam Hsiao (蕭敬騰) in 2009 and 'Sorry Sorry', originally sung by Super Junior in 2009	<2nd place in the performance as a duo>, <3rd overall, (the final result) in the performance as a duo and solo>
2016	15 April	Ep14 (All stars)	'Green apple paradise' + 'I love you forever'.	'Green apple paradise (青蘋果樂園)', originally sung by Xiao Hu Dui in 1989, 'I love you forever (對你愛不完)', originally sung by Aaron Kwok in 1990	

=== Immortal Songs 2 (Immortal Songs: Singing the Legend) ===
Year	Date	Episode	Legend / Subject	Title of the Song	Originally Sung by	Score / Note
2015	25 April	196	Seo Yu Seok	Cloud Wanderer	구름 나그네, originally sung by Choi Heon in 1978	416
2015	2 May	197	The legend of the seven singers (7인의 전설)	Chilgapsan	칠갑산, originally sung by Joo Byungseon in 1989	
2015	16 May	199	Family Special	Father	아버지, originally sung by Insooni in 2009	Winner of Ep 199, a score of 425
2015	23 May / 30 May	200/201	200th Episode Special with Legend Kim Soo Chul	Tomorrow	내일, originally sung by Kim Soo-chul in 1979, 1983)	
2015	6 June	202	Lee Seung-chul Special	That person	그 사람, a soundtrack of Bread, Love and Dreams, originally sung by Lee Seung-chul in 2010	
2015	4 July	206	Kim Ji Ae & Moon Hee Ok	Because of Affections	정 때문에, originally sung by Moon Heeok in 1998	418
2015	1 August	210	Male Vocalists' Special	Sad promise	슬픈 언약식, originally sung by Kim Jung-min, also known as a singer, in 1995	
2015	8 August	Ep 211	Kim Jung Taek (김정택)	It's still a dark night	아직도 어두운 밤인가봐, originally sung by Jeon Youngrok in 1984	
2015	15 August	Ep 212	Super Rookie Special	You're Just Somewhere a Little Higher Than Me	나보다 조금 더 높은 곳에 니가 있을 뿐, originally sung by Shin Seung-hun in 2001	Winner of Ep 212, a score of 430
2015	22 August	Ep 213	Ban Ya Wol (반야월)	Bakdal-Jae crying and passing over	울고 넘는 박달재, originally sung by Park Jaehong in 1948	380
2015	29 August / 5 September	214 /215	Jo Young-nam, Yun Hyung Ju	Anything that's part of you	낙엽 따라 가버린 사랑, originally sung by Elvis Presley in 1961	
2015	26 September	Ep 218	Chuseok Special	Pink lipstick	분홍 립스틱, originally sung by Rija in 1988	
2015	21 November	Ep 226	Kim Jeong-ho	White butterfly	하얀 나비, originally sung by Kim Jeong-ho in 1983	
2015	28 November	Ep 227	Baek Ji-young Special	Burden	부담, originally sung by Baek Ji-young in 1999	Winner of Ep 227, a score of 432
2015	12 December	Ep 229	g.o.d special	Lies	거짓말, originally sung by g.o.d in 2000	
2017	7 January	Ep 285-present	Immortal Songs-2017 Songs of Hope Special	Joy	환희, originally sung by Jung Su Ra in 1988	402, Hwang joined the show as a host, starting from Ep285
2017	22 July	Ep 313	Summer together with friends of Summer Special's Part 1.	Wave	파도, originally sung by UN in 2001	423, Hwang and Kim Young-chul teamed up for DUET collaboration.
2017	16 September	Ep 321	Autumn Men Special	Standing under the shade of a Roadside Tree,	Originally sung by Lee Moon-se in 1988	
