= Player 7 =

South Korean television show

- Promotional poster for Season 1
- Hangul: 플레이어
- RR: Peulleieo
- MR: P'ŭlleiŏ
- Genre: Reality; Variety; Comedy
- Country of origin: South Korea
- Original language: Korean
- No. of seasons: 2
- No. of episodes: 29

Production
- Production location: South Korea
- Running time: 75 minutes

Original release
- Network: tvN, XtvN
- Release: July 14, 2019 – March 21, 2020

Player 7 (Korean: 플레이어; lit. 'Player') is a South Korean television program which airs on tvN and XtvN on Sundays at 18:15 (KST) from July 14, 2019 to December 8, 2019 for Season 1.

On January 7, 2020 it was confirmed that the show will return with Season 2, airing on every Saturday at 18:10 (KST) starting February 1. Hwang Chi-yeul will join the original cast lineup for the season. The season ended on March 21.

== Synopsis ==
The cast members have to hold their laughs and go through different scenarios. Every time a player laughs, ₩10,000 will be deducted instantly from his own appearance fee, and also get dowsed with water that comes out from a backpack each worn by each player. At the end of each theme, the cast member with the least amount of laughs will have his appearance fee paid in full.

- In some scenarios, the guests invited by the production crew will follow the "do not laugh at any time" rule, otherwise they have to also get wet in the same way as the cast members.
- In some themes, it is possible for the cast members to have more or less than the fixed of their appearance fees deducted, or even have the deduction reset to zero, through additional small rules/games in the scenarios.

The changes made for Season 2 are as follow:

- The cast members will carry the water backpacks in only some scenarios, instead of all scenarios.
- More types of role play will be done, rather than focusing on holding their laughs.
- Season 1 is an individual battle to protect their appearance fees, while for Season 2 it will be a team battle.
- For the season, besides the scenarios, a special corner named Bonus Play is shown at the end of each episode, where each member individually does a short skit or the production team provides bonus footage edits.

== Cast ==
Name	Character (Season 1)	Character (Season 2)	Episodes	
Name	Character (Season 1)	Character (Season 2)	Season 1	Season 2
Lee Soo-geun	Variety Leader		1 – 21	1 – 8
Kim Dong-hyun	Laughing Fighter		1 – 21	1 – 8
Hwang Je-sung	Gullible Customer(?)	Lovely, God of Cheap	1 – 21	1 – 8
Lee Yong-jin	Variety Trend	Strong(?) Bluffer	1 – 21	1 – 8
Lee Jin-ho	Comedian From Inside The Bones	Innocent Smarty	1 – 21	1 – 8
Lee Yi-kyung	Poker Face	Official Comedian-actor	1 – 21	1 – 8
Jung Hyuk	New Character	The World's Tension	1 – 16, 19 – 21	1 – 8
Hwang Chi-yeul	—N/a	New Face! China's Crown Prince	—N/a	1 – 8

=== Intern Player (for only Season 1) ===
Name	Episode
Henry	5 – 6
Kim Jong-min (Koyote)	8 – 10
Moon Se-yoon	15 – 16
UV (Yoo Se-yoon, Muzie)	17 – 19

== Episodes (2019, Season 1) ==
List of episodes (episode 1–21)

Ep.	Broadcast Date	Scenarios	Guest(s)	Note(s)
1	July 14	Exorcism School (Exorcism Theory + Exorcism Real Life Application + Gut Training #1)	Jang Dong-min, Lee Sung-jong (Infinite)	—N/a
2	July 21	Exorcism School (Gut Training #2)	Jang Dong-min, Seo Yu-ri	—N/a
3	July 28	Player 101 (Grade Test + Debut Press Conference With Prohibited Words #1)	Jang Dong-min, Kim Soo-yong, Kim Yeon-woo, Hwanhee (Fly to the Sky), Micky Kwangsoo, Shindong (Super Junior), BewhY, Choi Sung-min	—N/a
4	August 4	Player 101 (Debut Press Conference With Prohibited Words #2 + Vigor Boys Debut Training + Radio Schedule (Park So-hyun's The Love Game) #1)	Choi Sung-min, Jang Dong-min, Kim Tae-woo (g.o.d), Ailee, Park So-hyun	—N/a
5	August 11	Literature MT in Chuncheon (Cultural Village Experience + Mommy Son Taste Restaurant); Player 101 (Radio Schedule (Park So-hyun's The Love Game) #2)	Park So-hyun, Jang Dong-min, Jonathan Yiombi, Im Ho, Lee Seung-yoon, Lee Won-il, Hong Yoon-hwa, Song Hae-na, Solbin (Laboum), Kim So-hye	Special voice appearances by Kwon Sang-woo and Moon Se-yoon through phone; Jung Hyuk sat out of the "Mommy Son Taste Restaurant" scenario to rest due to diarrhea
6	August 18	Literature MT in Chuncheon (Literature Night + Debate); Variety Museum (Hot Brothers - Avatar Date #1)	Chin Jung-kwon, Jang Dong-min, Lee Eun-ji, Ji Sang-ryeol, Hwang Hyo-jin, (Note: Model) Hwang Yoo-jin, Lee Yoo-jin, (Note: Actress, known for her role in the web series Love Playlist) Yang Geu-rin	—N/a
7	August 25	Variety Museum (Hot Brothers - Avatar Blind Date #2 + Operational Dad's Challenge + Don't Laugh Family Arcade #1)	Ji Sang-ryeol, Lee Yoo-jin, Yang Geu-rin, Jang Dong-min, Seo Yu-ri, Park Cho-eun, Heo Cham, Oh Young-sil, Park Mi-sun, Shin Ji (Koyote), Lee Soo-ji, Oh Ha-young (Apink), Soobin (Cosmic Girls)	—N/a
8	September 1	Variety Museum (Don't Laugh Family Arcade #2 + Really Dangerous Invitation); Show Me The Play (1st Auditions #1)	Heo Cham, Oh Young-sil, Park Mi-sun, Shin Ji (Koyote), Lee Soo-ji, Oh Ha-young (Apink), Soobin (Cosmic Girls), Park Seul-gi, Lee Sung-kyung, Jang Dong-min, Paloalto, John Park, Ravi (VIXX)	—N/a
9	September 8	Show Me The Play (1st Auditions #2 + Diss Battle)	K Jun, Jang Dong-min, Paloalto, Sean (Jinusean), Jo Woo-chan, Yang Dong-geun, DinDin, Dynamic Duo, Rohann, (Note: Rapper who took part in High School Rapper season 2 and is also known as Webster B, his real name Lee Ro-han and his former name Bae Yeon-seo) HOTCHKISS, (Note: Rapper who took part in High School Rapper season 3, where he's also known by his real name Kim Ho-jin) Sandy (Note: Rapper who is also known by her real name Ha Seon-ho, took part in High School Rapper seasons 2 and 3)	—N/a
10	September 22	Show Me The Play (Teacher Paloalto's Hip Hop Theory Introduction + Show Me The Play Finals)	Jang Dong-min, Paloalto, K Jun, Sean (Jinusean), Yang Dong-geun, Dynamic Duo, DinDin, Jo Woo-chan, Greg Priester, Eunha (GFriend), U Sung-eun, Bae Ki-sung	—N/a
11	September 29	Play Super Model (Personal Clothes Fashion Show Runway + Makeover Runway + Please Take Care Of My Closet)	Jang Yoon-ju, Lee Hyun-yi, Song Hae-na, Hwang Jae-keun, Kim Woo-ri, (Note: Stylist) Jang Dong-min	—N/a
12	October 6	Play Super Model (Challenge! Charm Mansour + Individual Photo Shoots)	Yoo Byung-jae, Jang Yoon-ju, Lee Hyun-yi, Song Hae-na, Jang Dong-min	—N/a
13	October 13	Genius (Don't Laugh! Brain Survival + Less Genius #1)	Jang Dong-min, KCM, Lee Sang-joon, Kim Ji-min, Kim Na-hee, Park Cho-rong (Apink), Ravi (VIXX), Park Jae-jung, Yoon Chae-kyung (April), Soobin (Cosmic Girls), Laboum, (Note: Member Solbin is absent) Park Cho-eun, Hong Jin-ho, Shin A-young, Kim Young-joon, Choi Woo-seon, (Note: Comedian) Yang Bae-cha, Ha Joon-soo, Nam Chang-hee, Lee Eun-ji	—N/a
14	October 20	Genius (Problematic Player + Less Genius #2)	Shin A-young, Jeong Si-hoo, (Note: Son of comedian Jeong Jong-cheol) Seventeen, (Note: Only members S.Coups, Jun, Hoshi, Wonwoo, DK, Seungkwan and Dino appeared) Jang Dong-min, Hong Jin-ho, Nam Chang-hee, Lee Eun-ji	—N/a
15	October 27	Mister Athletics Championships (Special Relay Race + Charades From A Distance + Uphill Challenge)	Woo Ji-won, Jang Su-won (Sechs Kies), Chun Myung-hoon (NRG), Kim Yong-myung, KCM, Hong Jin-ho, Nam Chang-hee, Ha Sung-woon (HOTSHOT), Yoon Yeo-choon, (Note: Athletics commentator) Choi Sung-min, Seunghee (Oh My Girl)	—N/a
16	November 3	Mister Athletics Championships (Don't Laugh! Live And Fall Together)	Kim Ga-yeon, Narsha (Brown Eyed Girls), Hong Yoon-hwa, Hyoyeon (Girls' Generation), Shin Soo-ji, Yerin (GFriend)	Special Host: Heechul (Super Junior)
17	November 10	Trot Star K (1st Auditions #1)	Sul Woon-do, Kim Hye-yeon, Heo Kyung-hwan, Hong Jin-young, Greg Priester, Kim Yeon-woo	Jung Hyuk is absent for the whole Trot Star K theme due to other schedules
18	November 17	Trot Star K (1st Auditions #2 + Hong Jin-young's Trot Lesson + Trot Duet Song Festival #1)	Heo Kyung-hwan, Hong Jin-young, Sul Woon-do, Kim Hye-yeon, Greg Priester, Kim Yeon-woo, Park Jae-jung, Kang Ye-seul (Wings), Park Ku-yoon, Wink	Jung Hyuk is absent for the whole Trot Star K theme due to other schedules
19	November 24	Trot Star K (Trot Duet Song Festival #2); No Nights 2 Days Refund Settlement Trip #1	Heo Kyung-hwan, Hong Jin-young, Sul Woon-do, Kim Hye-yeon, Greg Priester, Kang Ye-seul, Park Ku-yoon, Wink, Lee Ahyumi, Suran, Noel (Jeon Woo-sung, Kang Kyun-sung), Solji (EXID), Wax	Jung Hyuk is absent for the whole Trot Star K theme due to other schedules
20	December 1	No Nights 2 Days Refund Settlement Trip #2 (Special Road To Work + Lunch Luck Game)	—N/a	—N/a
21	December 8	No Nights 2 Days Refund Settlement Trip #3	Jang Dong-min	—N/a

== Episodes (2020, Season 2) ==
List of episodes (episode 1–8)

Ep.	Broadcast Date	Scenarios	Guest(s)	Note(s)
1	February 1	Random Play (Season 2 Press Conference With Prohibited Words); Bonus Play (In Front of Korean's Dinner Table by Lee Jin-ho)	Shin A-young, Jang Dong-min	Special voice appearance by Song Jin-woo through phone
2	February 8	Random Play (Avatar Play); Show Me The Play 2 (1st Auditions #1); Bonus Play (Added a beat to MC Abbot's rap)	Jang Dong-min, Micky Kwangsoo, Park Cho-eun, K Jun, Hyun Jin-young, Kim Sung-soo (Cool), Giant Pink, Ha Sung-woon (HOTSHOT), Olltii, Verbal Jint, Mommy Son, Cheetah, GroovyRoom, Superbee, Nafla, Loopy, Kim Yong-myung	
3	February 15	Show Me The Play 2 (1st Auditions #2 + Crew Battle #1); Bonus Play (Small Human Theatre Episode 1 - Zion.Man Who Is The Comedy Big League Youngest)	Verbal Jint, Mommy Son, Cheetah, GroovyRoom, Superbee, Nafla, Loopy, Giant Pink, Ha Seung-jin, Sleepy, Kang Ye-seul (Wings), Hyun Jin-young, Ha Sung-woon (HOTSHOT), Olltii, K Jun, Kim Yong-myung	Special appearances by Moon Se-yoon, Yang Se-chan
4	February 22	Show Me The Play 2 (Crew Battle #2 + Final Collaboration Stages)	Verbal Jint, Mommy Son, Cheetah, GroovyRoom, Superbee, Nafla, Loopy, Giant Pink, Ha Sung-woon (HOTSHOT), Olltii, K Jun, Kim Yong-myung, Seo Kyung-seok, Nam Sang-il, Jang Dong-min, Yook Joong-wan, U Sung-eun, DAVII, Chin Chilla, Jiselle, Byul, Son Seung-yeon, Koo Jun-yup, Park Bom	
5	February 29	Close Friends Signal (First Impressions + Lunchbox Dates); Show Me The Play 2 ("SWAG" Music Video Making)	Park Mi-sun, Jang Dong-min, Hong Yoon-hwa, Lee Dok-shil, (Note: Science columnist) Shim So-young, Shindong (Super Junior), Chin Chilla, Jiselle	
6	March 7	Close Friends Signal (Couple Yoga + Friendship Date + Dinner + Final Selections)	Park Mi-sun, Jang Dong-min, Hong Yoon-hwa, Lee Dok-shil, Shim So-young, Yang Jung-won, Yu A-reum (Note: Yoga instructor)	
7	March 14	Live Broadcast Play (My Little Player) (Ask Anything + Pole Dance + Yodeling + Magic)	Jang Dong-min, Jo Sung-a, (Note: Pole dancer) Lee Eun-kyung, (Note: Yodeling singer) Kang Dong-hae, Choi Hyun-woo	
8	March 21	Live Broadcast Play (My Little Player) (Hwang Je-sung's Skit Class + Four Idiots VS Sports Stars)	Jang Dong-min, Heo Sung-tae, Heo Young-ji, Choi Sung-min, Cho Joong-hyun, Kim Ji-hye, (Note: Women's football player) Oh Hyun-hee, Kang Soo-jin, Kim Yo-han, Yang Bae-cha, Heo Seon-haeng, (Note: Wrestler) Park Jeong-woo	

== Discography ==
This album was released as a compilation of all the members for the episode "Show Me The Play 2".

Show Me The Play 2 Final Released on February 22, 2020
No.	Title	Artist	Length
1.	"SWAG" (스웩님)	Lee Soo-geun (ft. Chin Chilla and Jiselle)	3:18
2.	"Drinking" (술이야)	Lee Yong-jin (ft. Byul and Nafla)	4:32
3.	"Easy Nong" (유기농 이지농)	Lee Jin-ho (ft. U Sang-eun)	4:06
4.	"Go Back" (고백)	Kim Dong-hyun and Hwang Je-sung (ft. Yook Joong-wan)	3:46
5.	"Come Back" (돌아와)	Lee Yi-kyung and Jung Hyuk (ft. DJ Koo and Park Bom)	4:45
6.	"A Daily Dialect" (매일 쓰는 사투리)	Hwang Chi-yeul (ft. Son Seung-yeon)	3:42
Total length:			24.09

== Ratings ==
- This show airs on a cable channel/pay TV which normally has a relatively smaller audience compared to free-to-air TV/public broadcasters (KBS, SBS, MBC and EBS)
- Ratings listed below are the individual corner ratings of Player 7. (Note: Individual corner ratings do not include commercial time, which regular ratings include.)
- In the ratings below, the highest rating for the show will be in red and the lowest rating for the show will be in blue each year.

=== 2019 (Season 1) ===
List of ratings (episode 1–21)

Ep. #	Original Airdate	AGB Nielsen Ratings (tvN Nationwide)
1	July 14	1.2%
2	July 21	1.0%
3	July 28	1.1%
4	August 4	1.3%
5	August 11	1.3%
6	August 18	1.2%
7	August 25	1.4%
8	September 1	1.7%
9	September 8	1.4%
10	September 22	0.9%
11	September 29	1.0%
12	October 6	1.2%
13	October 13	1.5%
14	October 20	1.1%
15	October 27	1.4%
16	November 3	1.3%
17	November 10	1.4%
18	November 17	1.6%
19	November 24	1.5%
20	December 1	1.2%
21	December 8	0.7%

=== 2020 (Season 2) ===
List of ratings (episode 1–8)

Ep. #	Original Airdate	AGB Nielsen Ratings (tvN Nationwide)
1	February 1	1.3%
2	February 8	1.0%
3	February 15	0.8%
4	February 22	0.7%
5	February 29	1.0%
6	March 7	0.9%
7	March 14	1.2%
8	March 21	0.8%
