= My Little Television =

2015–2017 South Korean television series

- Genre: Entertainment
- Presented by: Seo Yu-ri, Kim Gu-ra
- Country of origin: South Korea
- Original language: Korean
- No. of seasons: 1
- No. of episodes: 101+ 2 (pilot)

Production
- Production location: South Korea
- Running time: 70 minutes

Original release
- Network: MBC, KakaoTV
- Release: February 22 & 28, 2015 (pilot); April 25, 2015 – June 10, 2017

My Little Television (Korean: 마이 리틀 텔레비전) is a South Korean television program which has been broadcast since February 2015, and features personal internet broadcasting similar to the likes of afreecaTV, Twitch or Daum tvPot. This program is inspired by real-time streaming services. It is a program that values communication with viewers. The program is hosted by Seo Yu-ri. The program is formatted in the form of a competition between main casts based on their internet broadcasting performance. It airs on KakaoTV (Raw live broadcasting of 'channels' of main casts/random time on Sundays (KST) every 2 weeks), as well as on MBC (Every Saturday at 23:15) since the beginning of April 25, 2015. The first season finished on June 10, 2017 with 101 episodes aired and 50 shows streamed online.

Season 2 of the program, My Little Television V2, began airing on March 29, 2019 and ended on January 20, 2020.

== List of episodes ==
=== 2015 ===
List of Episodes (2015)
Pilot episodes (MLT-00)
- Internet Broadcast (Live) : February 8, 2015
- TV Broadcast: February 22 & 28, 2015

Cast	Nickname	Room Title	Broadcast Topic	Guest	Ranking
Baek Jong-won	Housewife Baek	Online Midnight Snack	Cooking		1st
Choa	Superstar Choa	The Cam Towards Me	Dance, Music, Make-up		2nd
Kim Gu-ra	Kim Gura	True Stories	Pop Music, Medical Consultation	MC GREE, Jung Woo-yeol (Psychiatrist)	3rd
Hong Jin-young	Fresh Battery	Heungsaeng Heungsa	Food Broadcast, Fashion	Chae Yeon	4th
Kim Young-chul	Keanu Reeves	Fun Fun English	English Conversation	Jessica (Africa TV BJ)	5th
Jung Jun-il	Monster	New York, New York, New York	Music Broadcast	Jo Jung-chi (Guitarist)	6th

Episode 1 & 2 (MLT-01)
- Internet Broadcast (Live) : April 12, 2015
- TV Broadcast: April 25 & May 2, 2015

Cast	Nickname	Room Title	Broadcast Topic	Guest	Ranking
Baek Jong-won	Housewife Baek	Advanced Recipes	Cooking		1st
Choa	Superstar Choa		Dance, Music	Jimin (AOA)	2nd
Kim Gu-ra	Kim Gura	True Baseball Stories	Baseball	MC GREE, Ho Goo-yeon (Baseball Commentator)	3rd
Yeo Jung-hwa	Coach Yeo	DIY Fitness	Fitness		4th
Kang Kyun-sung	Madam Kang	Distressed Salon	Distressed Consultation		5th

Episode 3 & 4 (MLT-02)
- Internet Broadcast (Live) : May 3, 2015
- TV Broadcast: May 9 & 16, 2015

Cast	Nickname	Room Title	Broadcast Topic	Guest	Ranking
Baek Jong-won	Housewife Baek	Advanced Recipes	Cooking		1st
Yeo Jung-hwa	Coach Yeo	Bittersweet Sports Class	Fitness		2nd
Choa	Superstar Choa	Hard Choa Festival	Dance, Music	AOA	3rd
Kim Gu-ra	Kim Gura	True Stories	History	MC GREE, Lee Da-ji (History Teacher), Jo Se-ho, Nam Chang-hee	4th
Jung San	Teacher San	Hip-hop class	Hip-hop	Jessi	5th

Episode 5 & 6 (MLT-03)
- Internet Broadcast (Live) : May 17, 2015
- TV Broadcast: May 23 & 30, 2015

Cast	Nickname	Room Title	Broadcast Topic	Guest	Ranking
Baek Jong-won	Housewife Baek	Premium Recipes	Cooking		1st
Hani	What Are You Doing (Note: Korean wordplay on Hani's name)	Real Hani Show	Dance, Music	LE (EXID), Shinsadong Tiger	2nd
Jung Joon-young	Visual Jung		Review		3rd
Kim Gu-ra	Kim Gura	True Money Stories	Economy	MC GREE, Jung Cheol-jin (Economy Expert), Jo Young-gu (Broadcaster, Scam Victim)	4th
Hong Jin-kyung	Hong Free One Free	Hong Free One Free Show	Talk		5th

Episode 7 & 8 (MLT-04)
- Internet Broadcast (Live) : May 31, 2015
- TV Broadcast: June 6 & 13, 2015

Cast	Nickname	Room Title	Broadcast Topic	Guest	Ranking
Baek Jong-won	Housewife Baek	More Advanced Recipes	Cooking		1st
Key	Kibum-i.e.	"View"tiful Life (Note: Korean wordplay on SHINee's song, View)	Lifestyle, Pet		2nd
Hong Seok-cheon	Headmaster Hong	I Will Save You	Cooking, Fashion	Lee Hyuk (NORAZO), Kim Woo-ri (Stylist)	3rd
Shin Soo-ji	Soo-ji Q	Miracle Gymnastics Show	Gymnastics + Bowling	Kwon Hae-bom (Guinea Pig PD)	4th
Kim Gu-ra	Kim Gura	True Art Story	Art	Kim Bum-soo, Ahn Kwang-no (Artist), Kim, Ji-hyun (Art Director)	5th

Episode 9 & 10 (MLT-05)
- Internet Broadcast (Live) : June 14, 2015
- TV Broadcast: June 20 & 27, 2015
- Location: Jebu Island

Cast	Nickname	Room Title	Broadcast Topic	Guest	Ranking
Baek Jong-won	Housewife Baek	More Advanced Recipes	Cooking		1st
Lee Eun-gyeol	The Illusionist EG	Illusion TV	Magic		2nd
Kim Gu-ra	Kim Gura	True Camping Story	Camping	MC GREE, Kim Min-jong, Kim Jun-seong (Camping Specialist), Kim Hyun-seok	3rd
Yeo Jung-hwa	Coach Yeo		Fitness	Yeo Dong-woo (Yeo Jung-hwa's younger brother)	4th
Dasom	Refreshing Kim	Secret That Can Be Told	Psychological Consultation		5th

Episode 11 & 12 (MLT-06)
- Internet Broadcast (Live) : June 28, 2015
- TV Broadcast: July 4 & 11, 2015

Cast	Nickname	Room Title	Broadcast Topic	Guest	Ranking
Baek Jong-won	Housewife Baek	More Advanced Recipes	Cooking		1st
Lee Eun-gyeol	The Illusionist EG	Fiction TV	Magic	Lee Seol-hee	2nd
Solji	Soul G	Sol Sol La La Sol Sol Ji	Music	Kwon Hae-bom (Guinea Pig PD), Kwak Ho-seon, Gavin	3rd
Kim Gu-ra	Kim Gura	True History	History	MC GREE, Kim Sae-rom, Ham Kyu-jin (Professor), Kwon Byung-ho (Multi-instrument Musicians)	4th
Hong Seok-cheon	Headmaster Hong	I Will Save You	Interior	Yang Tae-oh (Designer), Kim Woo-ri (Stylist)	5th

Episode 13 & 14 (MLT-07)
- Internet Broadcast (Live) : July 12, 2015
- TV Broadcast: July 18 & 25, 2015

Cast	Nickname	Room Title	Broadcast Topic	Guest	Ranking
Kim Young-man	Young Man	Today, Let's Make Some Stuff?	Paper Crafts		1st
Baek Jong-won	Housewife Baek	Advanced Recipes	Cooking		2nd
Solji	Soul G	Sol Sol La La Sol Sol Ji	Music + Self Defense	Seo Eun-kwang (BTOB)	3rd
Kim Gu-ra	Kim Gura	True Coffee Story	Coffee	Kim Sae-rom, Kim Heung-guk, Seo Pil-hoon, Jung Kyung-woo (Barista)	4th
Lady Jane	Cupid Jane	Love, Be Aware	Love	Kim Bum-soo, Jung Young-woong (voice), Jang Eun-sook (voice)	5th

Episode 15 & 16 (MLT-08)
- Internet Broadcast (Live) : July 26, 2015
- TV Broadcast: August 1 & 8, 2015

Cast	Nickname	Room Title	Broadcast Topic	Guest	Ranking
Lee Eun-gyeol	The Illusionist EG	Fiction TV	Magic	2015 World Magic Olympic Winners	1st
Kim Young-man	Young Man	Today, Let's Make Some Stuff?	Paper Crafts	Shin Se-kyung	2nd
Kim Namjoo (Apink)	Namjuice	Namjoo's Learning Period	Dance + Talk	Kim Hyun-ah (Sungkyunkwan University, The Department of Performing Arts)	3rd
Kim Gu-ra	Kim Gura	True Man's Story		Kim Heung-guk, Kim Jung-min, Shin Dong-heon (Deputy Editor of Leon Fashion Magazine)	4th
Hwang Jae-geun	Masked Jae-geun	Royal School of Design	Design		5th

Episode 17 & 18 (MLT-09)
- Internet Broadcast (Live) : August 9, 2015
- TV Broadcast: August 15 & 22, 2015

Cast	Nickname	Room Title	Broadcast Topic	Guest	Ranking
Lee Eun-gyeol	The Illusionist EG	Fiction TV	Magic		1st
Kim Gu-ra	Kim Gura	True Man's Story	Crime & Mystery	Kim Sae-rom, MC Gree, Kim Bok-jun (Professor)	2nd
Oh Se-deuk	Se-deuk-i	TBC	Eating broadcast		3rd
Hwang Jae-geun	Masked Jae-geun	Royal School of Design	Design	Kim Jin-kyung	4th
Kim Young-man	Young Man	Today, Let's Make Some Stuff?	Paper Crafts	Kim Dong-wan (Shinhwa)	5th

Episode 19 & 20 (MLT-10)
- Internet Broadcast (Live) : August 23, 2015
- TV Broadcast: August 29 & September 12, 2015

Cast	Nickname	Room Title	Broadcast Topic	Guest	Ranking
Kim Gu-ra	Kim Gura	True Man's Story	Beer	Kim Sae-rom, Kim Heung-gook	1st
Hwang Jae-geun	Masked Jae-geun	Royal School of Design	Design	Kim Jin-kyung (model)	2nd
Oh Se-deuk & Lee Chan-oh	Se-deuk-i		Cooking		3rd
Park Ji-woo	Jay Park	Cha Cha Cha	Dancesport	Choi Yeo-jin, Ryu Ji-won (Park Ji-woo's wife), Kwon Hae-bom (Guinea Pig PD)	4th
Kim Chung-weon	Professor Chung-weon		Art	Sayuri Fujita	5th

Episode 21 & 22 (MLT-11)
- Internet Broadcast (Live) : September 13, 2015
- TV Broadcast: September 19 & 26, 2015

Cast	Nickname	Room Title	Broadcast Topic	Guest	Ranking
Ha Yeon-soo	Poi-soo	Poi-soo Workshop	Art & Storytelling	Yoon Hee-na	1st
Cha Hong	Kind Cha Hong		Hairdressing		2nd
Oh Se-deuk	Se-deuk-i		Cooking & Eating broadcast	Lee Chan-oh, Kim Sae-rom, Yeo Jin-goo	3rd
Kim Gu-ra	Kim Gura	True Man's Story	Movies	Lee Won-seok (film director), Lee Ji-hye (film journalist), Yeo Jin-goo, Kim Sae-rom	4th
Park Ji-woo	Jay Park		Dancesport	Choi Yeo-jin, Ryu Ji-won (Park Ji-woo's wife), Kwon Hae-bom (Guinea Pig PD)	5th

Episode 23 & 24 (MLT-12)
- Internet Broadcast (Live) : September 29, 2015
- TV Broadcast: October 3 & 10, 2015

Cast	Broadcast Topic	Guest	Ranking
Park Choa	Simulation Games & Drama	Kwon Hae-bom (Guinea Pig PD), Park Jin-kyung	1st
Cha Hong	Hair design		2nd
Kim Gu-ra		Seo Jang-hoon, Kim Jung-min (actress), Kim Ji-yun	3rd
Oh Se-deuk & Kim So-bong	Cooking & Eating broadcast		4th
Hwang Jae-geun	Design	Lee Ho-jung (model)	5th

Episode 25 & 26 (MLT-13)
- Internet Broadcast (Live) : October 11, 2015
- TV Broadcast: October 17 & 24, 2015

Cast	Broadcast Topic	Guest	Ranking
Oh Se-deuk & Choi Hyun-seok	Cooking & Eating broadcast		1st
Jung Doo-hong	Action movie stunts	Kwon Hae-bom (Guinea Pig PD)	2nd
Solji (EXID)	Wedding flower arrangement	Seo Hye-lin (EXID), Choi Min-ji (Florist)	3rd
Park Myeong-su	EDM	DJ Charles, Yoo Jae-hwan	4th
Kim Gu-ra		Seo Jang-hoon, Kim Jung-min (actress), Jang Youngran, Kwon Byung-ho (musician), Park Sang-hee (psychoanalyst), Kim Ji-yun	5th

Episode 27 & 28 (MLT-14)
- Internet Broadcast (Live) : October 25, 2015
- TV Broadcast: October 31 & November 7, 2015

Cast	Broadcast Topic	Guest	Ranking
Lee Eun-gyeol	Magic & Fairytales		1st
Park Na-rae & Jang Do-yeon	Make-up talk	Jeon Eun-kyung (make-up artist)	2nd
Kim Gu-ra	Study	Ji Joo-yeon, Jo Seung-yeon (author), MC Gree	3rd
Lee Hye-jung (Big Mama)	Cooking		4th
Son Dae-sik & Park Tae-yun (Make-up artist)	Make-up		5th

Episode 29 & 30 (MLT-15)
- Internet Broadcast (Live) : November 8, 2015
- TV Broadcast: November 14 & 21, 2015

Cast	Broadcast Topic	Guest	Ranking
Lee Mal-nyeon	Webtoon		1st
Yoon Sang	Music	Kei & Sujeong (Lovelyz), Seo Ji-eum (lyricist)	2nd
Kim Gu-ra	Massage	Kim Jung-min (actress), MC Gree, Gu Dong-myung (massage specialist)	3rd
Lee Hye-jung (Big Mama)	Cooking	Ok Taec-yeon	4th
Kim Hyeon-uk	Speech	Kim Hyuna (Sungkyunkwan University), Kwon Hae-bom (Guinea Pig PD)	5th

Episode 31 & 32 (MLT-16)
- Internet Broadcast (Live) : November 22, 2015
- TV Broadcast: November 28 & December 5, 2015

Cast	Broadcast Topic	Guest	Ranking
Jeong Jun-ha	Eating broadcast & Dubbing	Yoon Hee-na	1st
Kim Gu-ra	Baseball	Yoo Hee-kwan (Doosan Bears' pitcher), Kim Jung-min (actress), Heo Gu-yeon (MBC baseball commentator)	2nd
Mina, Sana, Momo and Tzuyu (Twice)	Korean Culture	Jeong Jun-gil (Manager of Twice)	3rd
Han Hye-yeon	Design		4th
Lee Hye-jung (Big Mama)	Cooking	Go Jun-yung (Chef, daughter of Lee Hye-jeong)	5th

Episode 33 & 34 (MLT-17)
- Internet Broadcast (Live) : December 6, 2015
- TV Broadcast: December 12 & 19, 2015

Cast	Broadcast Topic	Guest	Ranking
Baek Jong-won	Cooking		1st
Dong Hyun Kim	UFC	Choi Doo-ho, Kwon Hae-bom (Guinea Pig PD), Kim Ha-na (Octagon girl)	2nd
Lee Mal-nyeon	Webtoon		3rd
Kim Gu-ra	Performing arts	Lee Yun-seok, Kim Jung-min (actress), Kim Yu-gon (Sunday Night producer)	4th
Han Hye-yeon	Design		5th

Episode 35 & 36 (MLT-18)
- Internet Broadcast (Live) : December 20, 2015
- TV Broadcast: December 26 & January 2, 2016

Cast	Broadcast Topic	Guest	Ranking
Dong Hyun Kim	UFC	Seo Hee Ham, Kwon Hae-bom (Guinea Pig PD), Kim Ha-na (Octagon girl)	1st
Jung Saem-mool	Make-up	Minha (Nine Muses), Kim Hyang-suk	2nd
Kim Gu-ra	Divination	Kim Heung-gook, Jo Young-gu, Park Sung-jun (architect), Kim Jin-hwan	3rd
Kim Sae-rom, Kim Jung-min (actress), Jang Youngran & Park Seul-gi	Reality show		4th
Lee Hye-jung (Big Mama)	Cooking	Go Jun-yung (Chef, daughter of Lee Hye-jeong)	5th

=== 2016 ===
List of Episodes (2016)
Episode 37 & 38 (MLT-19)
- Internet Broadcast (Live) : January 3, 2016
- TV Broadcast: January 9 & 16, 2016

Cast	Broadcast Topic	Guests	Ranking
Kim Sung-joo & Ahn Jung-hwan	Football		1st
Jung Saem-mool	Make-up	Yang Ji-won (Spica), Joo Seon-yeong (model)	2nd
Oh Se-deuk & Choi Hyun-seok	Cooking		3rd
Cho Jin-soo (J-Black n Pink)	Dancing	J Pink & Pinky Cheeks (Dance crew), Kwon Hae-bom (Guinea Pig PD)	4th
Kim Gu-ra	Musical	Kim Bum-soo, Jo Young-gu, Choi Woo-ri, Lee Jeong-ah	5th

Episode 39 & 40 (MLT-20)
- Internet Broadcast (Live) : January 17, 2016
- TV Broadcast: February 6 & 13, 2016

Cast	Broadcast Topic	Guests	Ranking
Lee Mal-nyeon & Yura (Girl's Day)	Webtoon		1st
Kim Gu-ra	Ramen	Kim Heung-gook, Cao Lu (Fiestar), Choi Yong-min (Marking manager, Paldo Ramen)	2nd
Yoon Min-soo	Singing	Ben, Yoo Seul-gi (vocal trainer)	3rd
Jung Saem-mool	Make-up	Yubin (Wonder Girls)	4th
Han Ye-ri	Korean dance	Yoon So-young, Kwon Hae-bom (Guinea Pig PD)	5th

Episode 41 & 42 (MLT-21)
- Internet Broadcast (Live) : February 14, 2016
- TV Broadcast: February 20 & 27, 2016

Cast	Broadcast Topic	Guests	Ranking
Defconn	Hip Hop	DJ Fractal, Kang Il-won (music critic)	1st
Sowon & Yerin (GFriend)	Cleaning	Yoon Sun-hyun	2nd
Kim Gu-ra	Home shopping	Kim Sae-rom, Jo Young-gu, Moon Chun-sik, Lee Min-woo	3rd
Jung Saem-mool	Make-up	Kim Jung-min (actress)	4th
Bbaek Ga	Photography	Baek Kwang-hyun (Bbaek Ga's brother)	5th

Episode 43 & 44 (MLT-22)
- Internet Broadcast (Live) : February 28, 2016
- TV Broadcast: March 5 & 12, 2016

Cast	Broadcast Topic	Guests	Ranking
Defconn	Animation	Kim Sung-il (animation programmer)	1st
Kahi & Bae Yoon-jung	Dance choreography	Kwon Hae-bom (Guinea Pig PD), Im Su-jeong (asst. director)	2nd
Kim Gu-ra	Gags	MC Gree, Kim Jung-min (actress), Kim Soo-yong, Shin Hyun-sub, Kim Kyung-min	3rd
Yoo Min-joo	Desserts		4th
Bbaek Ga	Photography		5th

Episode 45 & 46 (MLT-23)
- Internet Broadcast (Live) : March 13, 2016
- TV Broadcast: March 19 & 26, 2016

Cast	Broadcast Topic	Guests	Ranking
Lee Kyung-kyu	Companion dogs		1st
Dong Hyun Kim & Choo Sung-hoon	Judo	Kwon Hae-bom (Guinea Pig PD)	2nd
Kim Gu-ra	Billiards	Kim Jung-min (actress), Kim Tae-won, Lee Ki-young, Lee Mi-rae (billiards player)	3rd
Yoo Min-joo	Desserts		4th
Song Kyung-ah & Park Seung-gun	Model casting	Han Hye-yeon (stylist), Kim Tae-eun (photographer)	5th

Episode 47 & 48 (MLT-24)
- Internet Broadcast (Live) : March 27, 2016
- TV Broadcast: April 2 & 9, 2016

Cast	Broadcast Topic	Guests	Ranking
Lee Kyung-kyu	Fishing		1st
Kim Gu-ra	Baseball	Heo Gu-yeon (MBC baseball commentator), Chung In-young (announcer), Jo Young-gu	2nd
Yoo Min-joo	Desserts		3rd
Kim Eana	Writing lyrics	Cho Hyung-woo, Son Seung-yeon	4th
Park Tae-yang	Hair design	Kang Han-na	5th

Episode 49 & 50 (MLT-25)
- Internet Broadcast (Live) : April 10, 2016
- TV Broadcast: April 16 & 23, 2016

Cast	Broadcast Topic	Guests	Ranking
Lee Kyung-kyu	Horses		1st
Kim Gu-ra	Baduk	MC Gree, Kim Jung-min (actress), Eom Yong-su, Lee So-yong (Baduk commentator)	2nd
Yoon Do-hyun	Skateboard	Kim Min-woo (skateboard instructor), Kwon Hae-bom (Guinea Pig PD)	3rd
Han Hye-yeon & Park Seung-gun	Fashion show design	Song Hae-na (model)	4th
J Kim	Food styling		5th

Episode 51 & 52 (MLT-26)
- Internet Broadcast (Live) : April 24, 2016
- TV Broadcast: April 30 & May 7, 2016

Cast	Broadcast Topic	Guests	Ranking
Yang Jung-won	Pilates	Kwon Hae-bom (Guinea Pig PD)	1st
Lee Kyung-kyu	Flowers	Park Gu-yun, Park Sang-min, Lee Ye-rim (Lee Kyung-kyu's daughter)	2nd
Kim Gu-ra	Wine	Lee Seung-chul, Cao Lu (Fiestar), Jung Ha-bong (sommelier)	3rd
Park Tae-yang	Hair design	Seo Nam-yong, Park Ji-eun (hair designer)	4th
Lee Kyou-hyuk	Ice Skating	Lee Sang-hwa, Kim Ye-rim (figure skater), Lee Kyu-hyun (Lee Kyou-hyuk's brother)	5th

Episode 53 & 54 (MLT-27)
- Internet Broadcast (Live) : May 8, 2016
- TV Broadcast: May 14 & 21, 2016

Cast	Broadcast Topic	Guests	Ranking
Yang Jung-won	Pilates	Kwon Hae-bom (Guinea Pig PD)	1st
Lee Kyung-kyu	Jeet Kune Do		2nd
Jae-kyung & Ji-sook (Rainbow)	Nail art	Park Eun-kyung (nail designer)	3rd
Kim Gu-ra	Pop music	Yohei Hasegawa (Kiha & The Faces), Bae Soon-tak (Bae Cheol-soo's Music Camp scriptwriter)	4th
Chang Jin-woo	Cooking	Park Sang-won	5th

Episode 55 & 56 (MLT-28)
- Internet Broadcast (Live) : May 22, 2016
- TV Broadcast: May 28 & June 4, 2016

Cast	Broadcast Topic	Guests	Ranking
Lee Kyung-kyu	Golf	Choi Kyung-ju	1st
Jun Hyo-seong	ASMR	Jeong Woo-yul, Kwon Hae-bom (Guinea Pig PD)	2nd
Kim Gu-ra	Scalp care & hair loss	Kim Heung-gook, Im Lee-seok (dermatologist), Park Hwi-soon	3rd
Chang Jin-woo	Cooking	Kwon Hae-bom (Guinea Pig PD), Park Sang-won, Kim Heung-gook	4th
Muzie, Sul Woon-do, Kim Jo-han	Music		5th

Episode 57 & 58 (MLT-29)
- Internet Broadcast (Live) : June 5, 2016
- TV Broadcast: June 11 & 18, 2016

Cast	Broadcast Topic	Guests	Ranking
Lee Kyung-kyu	Musikdrama*	Defconn, Choi Min-geun (Real Men PD)	1st
Yoo Min-joo	Desserts		2nd
Ahn Hyuk-mo	Acting	Kei (Lovelyz), Kwon Hae-bom (Guinea Pig PD)	3rd
Jun Hyun-moo	Chinese	Cao Lu & Yezi (Fiestar), Zhang Yu'an	4th
Kim Gu-ra	Meteorites	Lee Kye-in, Jo Young-gu, Ahn Jae-eung (meteorite specialist)	5th

* For MLT-29, Lee Kyung-kyu did a live candid camera prank. The broadcast topic was made out to be Musikdrama, as the subject of the prank was known to watch the live internet broadcasts of the show.

Episode 59 & 60 (MLT-30)
- Internet Broadcast (Live) : June 19, 2016
- TV Broadcast: June 25 & July 2, 2016

Cast	Broadcast Topic	Guests	Ranking
Seventeen	Music	Yoon Hee-na	1st
Cha Hong	Hair design	Kang Seung-hyun (model)	2nd
Kim Gu-ra	Health	Jo Young-gu, Hyun Joo-yup, Wang Hye-mun	3rd
Ahn Hyuk-mo	Acting	Nara (Hello Venus), Kwon Hae-bom (Guinea Pig PD)	4th
Koo Young-jun	Photography for dummies	Yeo Yeon-hui & Son Min-ho (models)	5th

Episode 61 & 62 (MLT-31)
- Internet Broadcast (Live) : July 3, 2016
- TV Broadcast: July 9 & 16, 2016

Cast	Broadcast Topic	Guests	Ranking
Lee Eun-gyeol	Magic		1st
Tak Jae-hoon	Avatar & Tarot	Muzie, Kwon Hyuk-soo, Jeong Hee-do (tarot card expert)	2nd
Ahn Hyuk-mo	Acting	Joy (Red Velvet), Kwon Hae-bom (Guinea Pig PD), Choi Won-young	3rd
Kim Gu-ra	Tteok	Jo Young-gu, Hyun Joo-yup	4th
Chang Kiha	Music	Kiha & The Faces	5th

Episode 63 & 64 (MLT-32)
- Internet Broadcast (Live) : July 17, 2016
- TV Broadcast: July 23 & 30, 2016

Cast	Broadcast Topic	Guests	Ranking
Guckkasten	Music	None	1st
Kim Gu-ra	Name Fortunetelling	Jo Young-gu, Nam Chang-hee	2nd
Park Ji-woo	Dancesport	Kwon Hae-bom (Guinea Pig PD)	3rd
Bada	Product Review		4th
Fei	Cooking	JB & Junior (Got7)	5th

Episode 65 & 66 (MLT-33)
- Internet Broadcast (Live) : July 31, 2016
- TV Broadcast: August 27 & September 3, 2016

Cast	Broadcast Topic	Guests	Ranking
Kang Hyung-wook	Companion dogs	YooA (Oh My Girl), Kim So-young (announcer)	1st
Jay Park & Loco	Dance		2nd
Bada	Reality show		3rd
Kim Gu-ra	Psychology	Yoo Jae-hwan, Jo Young-gu, Song Hyung-suk (psychiatrist)	4th
Jeon Mi-ra	Tennis	Yoon Jong-shin (Jeon Mi-ra's husband), Yoon Ra-ik, Yoon Ra-Im & Yoon Ra-oh (Yoon Mi-ra & Yoon Jong-shin's children), Kwon Hae-bom (Guinea Pig PD)	5th

The TV broadcast of MLT-33 was postponed because of the 2016 Summer Olympics.

Episode 67 & 68 (MLT-34)
- Internet Broadcast (Live) : September 4, 2016
- TV Broadcast: September 10 & 17, 2016

Cast	Broadcast Topic	Guests	Ranking
Yoon Bo-mi (Apink) & Lee Dae-hoon	Taekwondo		1st
Kang Hyung-wook	Companion dogs	Im Soo-hyang	2nd
Jung Jae-hyung	Surfing	Cheng Xiao (Cosmic Girls), Kwon Hae-bom (Guinea Pig PD)	3rd
Kim Chang-ryul & Han Min-gwan	Motor vehicles		4th
Kim Gu-ra	Poetry	Jo Young-gu, Sol Bi	5th

Episode 69 & 70 (MLT-35)
- Internet Broadcast (Live) : September 18, 2016
- TV Broadcast: September 24 & October 8, 2016

Cast	Broadcast Topic	Guests	Ranking
Kim Ga-yeon, Lim Yo-hwan & Hong Jin-ho	Gaming		1st
Cheng Xiao (Cosmic Girls)		Eun-seo (Cosmic Girls) & Kim Kang-hyo (Vice President, Starship Entertainment)	2nd
Kim Gu-ra	Sushi	Heo Young-ji (Kara), Jo Young-gu	3rd
Kang Sung-tae (CEO of an online Hagwon)	Studying tips		4th
Kim Jung-hwan	Fencing	Choi Byung-chul, Solbin (Laboum), Kwon Hae-bom (Guinea Pig PD)	5th

Episode 71 & 72 (MLT-36)
- Internet Broadcast (Live) : October 9, 2016
- TV Broadcast: October 15 & 22, 2016

Cast	Broadcast Topic	Guests	Ranking
Son Yeon-jae	Rhythmic gymnastics	Cheng Xiao (Cosmic Girls), Cao Lu (Fiestar), Kwon Hae-bom (Guinea Pig PD)	1st
Kang Sung-tae (CEO of an online Hagwon)	Studying tips		2nd
Kim Gu-ra	Earthquakes	Nam Chang-hee, Sayuri Fujita	3rd
Hong Hye-gul & Yeo Esther	Health		4th
Henry Lau	Real estate	Park Jong-bok	5th

Episode 73 & 74 (MLT-37)
- Internet Broadcast (Live) : October 23, 2016
- TV Broadcast: October 29 & November 5, 2016

Cast	Broadcast Topic	Guests	Ranking
Hong Hye-gul & Yeo Esther	Dieting		
Lee Hye-jung (Big Mama)	Kimchi	Baro (B1A4), Hong Yoon-hwa (comedian)	
Kim Gu-ra	Impersonations	Jung Jong-chul, Ahn Yoon-sang, Kim Hak-do, Jo Young-gu	
Cho Jun-ho & Cho Jun-hyeon	Judo	Kwon Hae-bom (Guinea Pig PD)	
Brian Joo	Floral Design & CrossFit	Kim Ye-won	

Episode 75 & 76 (MLT-38)
- Internet Broadcast (Live) : November 6, 2016
- TV Broadcast: November 12 & November 19, 2016

Cast	Broadcast Topic	Guests	Ranking
Hong Hye-gul & Esther Yeo	Health		
Jung Eun-ji (Apink)	Samul nori & Calligraphy	Lee San (calligraphy writer), Kim Deok-su	
Hur Jae, Heo Ung & Heo Hoon	Basketball		
Kim Gu-ra	Suits	Jo Young-gu, Heo Young-ji	
Lee Joon-hyuk	Mime	Yoon Park, Kwon Hae-bom (Guinea Pig PD)	

Episode 77 & 78 (MLT-39)
- Internet Broadcast (Live) : November 21, 2016
- TV Broadcast: November 26 & December 3, 2016

Cast	Broadcast Topic	Guests	Ranking
Lee Chun-soo	Football	Kwon Hae-bom (Guinea Pig PD), Lee Yeong-nam, Ji Byung-joo, Ahn Jin-beom	
Lee Kyung-kyu	Bulldogs		
Kim Gu-ra	Leadership	Jo Young-gu, MC Gree	
Kim Hyung-kyu	Dental health		
Seo In-young	Shoes	Jessi	

Episode 79, 80 & 81 (MLT-40)
- Internet Broadcast (Live) : December 4, 2016
- TV Broadcast: December 10, 17 & 24, 2016
- Collaboration special

Cast	Broadcast Topic	Guests	Ranking
Park Ji-woo, Dong Hyun Kim, Yang Jung-won, Cho Jun-ho & Cho Joon-hyun	Physical education	Kwon Hae-bom (Guinea Pig PD)	
Cha Hong, Jung Saem-mool, Hong Hye-gul & Esther Yeo	Beauty		
Kim Gu-ra & Lee Kyung-kyu	Entertainment	Jo Woo-jong, Jung Bum-kyun, Yoon Hyung-bin & MC Ding Dong	
Kim Young-man, Hwang Jae-keun, Yoo Min-joo & Cheng Xiao (Cosmic Girls)	The arts		

=== 2017 ===
Episode 82 & 83 (MLT-41)
- Internet Broadcast (Live) : January 1, 2017
- TV Broadcast: January 7 & 14, 2017
- The number of broadcasting channels is reduced to four from this episode.

Cast	Broadcast Topic	Guests	Ranking
Akdong Musician	Song	Kwon Hae-bom (Guinea Pig PD)	1st
Lee Kyung-kyu	Real estate	Yang Jin-seok	2nd
DinDin	Reality show	Myung Seung-kwon (National cancer center specialist)	3rd
Kim Gu-ra	Fortune-telling	Jo Young-gu, MC Gree	4th

Episode 84 & 85 (MLT-42)
- Internet Broadcast (Live) : January 15, 2017
- TV Broadcast: January 21 & February 4, 2017

Cast	Broadcast Topic	Guests	Ranking
Bolbbalgan4	Song	Kwon Hae-bom (Guinea Pig PD)	1st
Lee Kyung-kyu	Film	Kim Tae-hoon (Pop columnist)	2nd
Sam Okyere & Tyler Rasch	At-home workouts and home cooking	Hong Seong-ran(food specialist)	3rd
Kim Gu-ra	Sleep	Jo Young-gu, MC Gree	4th

Episode 86 & 87 (MLT-43)
- Internet Broadcast (Live) : February 5, 2017
- TV Broadcast: February 11 & 18, 2017

Cast	Broadcast Topic	Guests	Ranking
Kang Hyung-wook	Dogs	Seolhyun, Mina (AOA)	1st
Kim Gu-ra & Seo Jang-hoon	Rice balls	Hong Seung-ran	2nd
Astro	Aerobics	Kwon Hae-bom (Guinea Pig PD)	3rd
Joo Ho-min	Webtoon	Kim Poong, Lee Mal-nyeon	4th

Episode 88 & 89 (MLT-44)
- Internet Broadcast (Live) : February 19, 2017
- TV Broadcast: February 25 & March 4, 2017

Cast	Broadcast Topic	Guests	Ranking
Mamamoo	Orientation training	Kwon Hae-bom (Guinea Pig PD)	1st
Jeon So-mi	Sport climbing	Kim Ja-in(rock climber), Matthew Douma(actor, So-mi's father)	2nd
Kim Gu-ra	Travel	Kim Jung-min (actress), Tae Won-jun (travel writer)	3rd
Lee So-ra (model)	Dieting		4th

Episode 90 & 91 (MLT-45)
- Internet Broadcast (Live) : March 5, 2017
- TV Broadcast: March 11 & 18, 2017

Cast	Broadcast Topic	Guests	Ranking
Jeon So-mi	Coffee Barista	Kwon Hae-bom (Guinea Pig PD)	1st
Hong Seong-ran	Egg dishes	Chaekyung (April)	2nd
Kim Poong & Joo Ho-min	Webtoon	Jeong Jung-won (painter)	3rd
Kim Gu-ra	Jobs	Jo Young-gu, Yun Jae-hong (headhunter)	4th

Episode 92 & 93 (MLT-46)
- Internet Broadcast (Live) : March 19, 2017
- TV Broadcast: March 25 & April 1, 2017

Cast	Broadcast Topic	Guests	Ranking
Highlight	Camping		1st
Mina & Sejeong (Gugudan)	Home decoration	Decorit (interior designer)	2nd
Lee Sang-min	Lifestyle		3rd
Kim Gu-ra	Democracy	Kim Jung-min (actress), Sim Yong-hwan (historian)	4th

Episode 94 & 95 (MLT-47)
- Internet Broadcast (Live) : April 2, 2017
- TV Broadcast: April 8 & 15, 2017

Cast	Broadcast Topic	Guests	Ranking
WINNER	Reality show		1st
Jeong Da-rae	Swimming	Kwon Hae-bom (Guinea Pig PD), Kwon Do-u (FD)	2nd
Yoo Byung-jae	Professional wrestling	Kim Nam-seok, Kim Su-bin (professional wrestlers)	3rd
Kim Gu-ra	Composition	Kim Jung-min (actress), Kang Won-guk (former presidential speechwriter)	4th

Episode 96 & 97 (MLT-48)
- Internet Broadcast (Live) : April 16, 2017
- TV Broadcast: April 22 & May 13, 2017

Cast	Broadcast Topic	Guests	Ranking
Yura & Hyeri (Girl's Day)	Escape Room	Kwon Hae-bom (Guinea Pig PD), Park Chan-won (Escape Room Designer)	1st
Kim Ki-soo (Comedian)	Beauty Tips	Kim Mi-ji (Program Writer)	2nd
Joon Park	Fitness		3rd
Kim Gu-ra	Law	Jo Young-gu, Park Ji-hun (Lawyer)	4th

Episode 98 & 99 (MLT-49)
- Internet Broadcast (Live) : May 14, 2017
- TV Broadcast: May 20 & 27, 2017

Cast	Broadcast Topic	Guests	Ranking
Blackpink	Fine particle pollution		1st
Kim Gu-ra	Real estate	Kim In-man (real estate consultant)	2nd
Jung Joon-young	Cocktail	Kim Bong-ha (Mixologist), Eddy Kim	3rd
Lee Hong-gi & Choi Jong-hoon (F.T. Island)	Cats	Kim Myeong-cheol (vet), Jang Sae-bom (cat beautician)	4th

Episode 100 & 101 (MLT-50)
- Internet Broadcast (Live) : May 28, 2017
- TV Broadcast: June 3 & 10, 2017
- My Little Television Season 1 Finale Episode
- Miss MLT's master is revealed to be Kim Gu-ra

Cast	Broadcast Topic	Guests	Ranking
Kim Gu-ra	Debate	Rhyu Si-min (Writer), Jo Young-gu	1st
Sechs Kies	Variety Show	Jo Hye-ryun (comedian)	2nd
Lee Eun-gyeol	Magic	Ju Mi-hyeon (Show Writer), Seo Yu-ri, Kwon Hae-bom (Guinea Pig PD)	3rd
Kang Hye-jin (Kid Program Host)	Handiwork	Kwon Yeong-Geun (Camera Director), Kwon Do-u (FD), Tak Won-hee (Show Writer), Kang Min-seok (Kang Hye-jin's brother)	4th

== Ratings ==
In the ratings below, the highest rating for the show will be in red, and the lowest rating for the show will be in blue each year.

=== Ratings (2015-16) ===
2015 Ratings

Year	Episode #		Original Airdate	TNmS Ratings		AGB Ratings	
Year	Episode #		Original Airdate	Nationwide	Seoul National Capital Area	Nationwide	Seoul National Capital Area
2015	Pilot		February 22	7.2%	6.4%	6.0%	6.4%
2015	Pilot		February 28	6.7%	5.6%	5.6%	6.2%
2015	MLT-01	1	April 25	4.5%	5.0%	5.8%	6.8%
2015	MLT-01	2	May 2	5.7%	7.2%	4.8%	5.5%
2015	MLT-02	3	May 9	6.4%	8.2%	6.7%	7.3%
2015	MLT-02	4	May 16	5.5%	6.5%	5.6%	6.3%
2015	MLT-03	5	May 23	7.5%	8.9%	7.3%	8.4%
2015	MLT-03	6	May 30	7.4%	8.9%	6.9%	7.7%
2015	MLT-04	7	June 6	7.3%	9.2%	7.2%	8.4%
2015	MLT-04	8	June 13	7.8%	9.8%	7.5%	8.4%
2015	MLT-05	9	June 20	10.6%	12.0%	10.0%	10.8%
2015	MLT-05	10	June 27	8.4%	9.6%	8.5%	9.2%
2015	MLT-06	11	July 4	8.9%	10.4%	8.3%	8.7%
2015	MLT-06	12	July 11	9.7%	11.9%	8.7%	9.6%
2015	MLT-07	13	July 18	10.5%	12.9%	8.5%	9.0%
2015	MLT-07	14	July 25	9.3%	11.6%	8.8%	9.8%
2015	MLT-08	15	August 1	7.3%	8.9%	7.2%	7.5%
2015	MLT-08	16	August 8	6.8%	9.1%	6.0%	6.5%
2015	MLT-09	17	August 15	8.4%	9.6%	7.7%	8.5%
2015	MLT-09	18	August 22	6.9%	8.8%	6.8%	7.9%
2015	MLT-10	19	August 29	7.2%	8.0%	7.2%	8.2%
2015	MLT-10	20	September 12	6.4%	7.8%	6.3%	6.9%
2015	MLT-11	21	September 19	7.0%	8.9%	6.6%	7.7%
2015	MLT-11	22	September 26	6.7%	8.1%	6.8%	8.0%
2015	MLT-12	23	October 3			5.4%	
2015	MLT-12	24	October 10			5.6%	
2015	MLT-13	25	October 17			6.1%	
2015	MLT-13	26	October 24			5.8%	
2015	MLT-14	27	October 31			7.1%	
2015	MLT-14	28	November 7			7.1%	
2015	MLT-15	29	November 14			6.2%	
2015	MLT-15	30	November 21			6.2%	
2015	MLT-16	31	November 28			6.6%	
2015	MLT-16	32	December 5			5.9%	
2015	MLT-17	33	December 12			6.9%	
2015	MLT-17	34	December 19			7.2%	
2015	MLT-18	35	December 26			6.2%	
2015	MLT-18	36	January 2, 2016			7.8%	

2016 Ratings

Year	Episode #		Original Airdate	AGB Ratings	
Year	Episode #		Original Airdate	Nationwide	Seoul National Capital Area
2016	MLT-19	37	January 9	8.7%	9.6%
2016	MLT-19	38	January 16	10.0%	11.3%
2016	MLT-20	39	February 6	9.2%	10.0%
2016	MLT-20	40	February 13	7.6%	8.7%
2016	MLT-21	41	February 20	8.5%	9.5%
2016	MLT-21	42	February 27	7.1%	8.1%
2016	MLT-22	43	March 5	6.8%	
2016	MLT-22	44	March 12	6.1%	
2016	MLT-23	45	March 19	9.2%	10.6%
2016	MLT-23	46	March 26	7.7%	8.8%
2016	MLT-24	47	April 2	6.6%	8.0%
2016	MLT-24	48	April 9	6.5%	
2016	MLT-25	49	April 16	6.3%	
2016	MLT-25	50	April 23	5.7%	6.7%
2016	MLT-26	51	April 30	6.4%	7.5%
2016	MLT-26	52	May 7	6.2%	
2016	MLT-27	53	May 14	5.9%	7.5%
2016	MLT-27	54	May 21	4.9%	
2016	MLT-28	55	May 28	5.4%	
2016	MLT-28	56	June 4	5.3%	
2016	MLT-29	57	June 11	6.0%	6.9%
2016	MLT-29	58	June 18	5.2%	6.0%
2016	MLT-30	59	June 25	5.6%	6.4%
2016	MLT-30	60	July 2	4.2%	
2016	MLT-31	61	July 9	4.8%	
2016	MLT-31	62	July 16	5.2%	
2016	MLT-32	63	July 23	6.8%	7.9%
2016	MLT-32	64	July 30	5.9%	7.0%
2016	MLT-33	65	August 27	4.3%	
2016	MLT-33	66	September 3	4.1%	
2016	MLT-34	67	September 10	5.6%	
2016	MLT-34	68	September 17	2.9%	
2016	MLT-35	69	September 24	4.9%	
2016	MLT-35	70	October 8	3.7%	
2016	MLT-36	71	October 15	5.2%	
2016	MLT-36	72	October 22	4.3%	
2016	MLT-37	73	October 29	4.2%	
2016	MLT-37	74	November 5	4.7%	
2016	MLT-38	75	November 12	4.5%	
2016	MLT-38	76	November 19	2.4%	
2016	MLT-39	77	November 26	3.5%	
2016	MLT-39	78	December 3	3.7%	
2016	MLT-40	79	December 10	3.9%	
2016	MLT-40	80	December 17	3.4%	
2016	MLT-40	81	December 24	3.1%	

=== Ratings (2017) ===
Year	Episode #		Broadcast Date	AGB Ratings	TNMS Ratings
2017	MLT-41	82	January 7	4.1%	4.2%
2017	MLT-41	83	January 14	4.2%	3.6%
2017	MLT-42	84	January 21	3.1%	3.3%
2017	MLT-42	85	February 4	3.6%	3.8%
2017	MLT-43	86	February 11	4.4%	4.2%
2017	MLT-43	87	February 18	4.8%	5.0%
2017	MLT-44	88	February 25	5.2%	4.4%
2017	MLT-44	89	March 4	3.6%	3.6%
2017	MLT-45	90	March 11	3.7%	4.1%
2017	MLT-45	91	March 18	3.8%	3.9%
2017	MLT-46	92	March 25	4.0%	4.2%
2017	MLT-46	93	April 1	3.7%	3.6%
2017	MLT-47	94	April 8	3.7%	4.0%
2017	MLT-47	95	April 15	3.7%	3.7%
2017	MLT-48	96	April 22	3.8%	4.0%
2017	MLT-48	97	May 13	2.8%	3.5%
2017	MLT-49	98	May 20	3.2%	3.1%
2017	MLT-49	99	May 27	3.0%	3.2%
2017	MLT-50	100	June 3	4.0%	4.6%
2017	MLT-50	101	June 10	4.1%	3.5%

== International versions ==
Currently airing
An upcoming season
No longer airing

Country	Name	Host	Channel	Premiere / Air dates
Thailand	Battle TV สถานีแข่งไลฟ์	Krit Sripoomseth	YouTube Live, Facebook Live, and Workpoint TV	13 June 2017 – 13 September 2017 (Season 1)
United States	Celebrity Show-Off	Mayim Bialik	TBS	23 June 2020 – 18 August 2020
