= Cha Hong =

South Korean hairdresser

Cha Hong 차홍
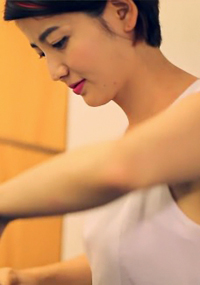
- Born: September 11, 1981 (age 45); Gyeonggi-do, South Korea
- Occupation: Hairdresser
- Years active: 2011–
- Spouse(s): Han Pil-su 한필수 (m. 2008)
- Children: 1
- Website: http://www.chahongardor.com/

- Korean name
- Hangul: 김효숙
- RR: Gim Hyosuk
- MR: Kim Hyosuk

Stage name
- Hangul: 차홍
- Hanja: 車紅
- RR: Cha Hong
- MR: Ch'a Hong

Kim Hyo-suk, better known by her stage name Cha Hong (Korean: 차홍), is a South Korean celebrity hairdresser, and is the owner and founder of the CHAHONG ARDOR beauty salon chain in South Korea. Cha established her first hair salon back in August 2011, and currently owns a total of three salons and an academy. and now features frequently as guests on various South Korean television shows, such as Channel M's Get It Beauty and MBC's My Little Television. Cha is renowned for the self-hair styling tips that she shares during her television appearances, and has since widened her media exposure through channels such as radio shows, blogs, social media websites and home shopping networks.

Cha and her salon chain provide hair and make-up services for events such as magazine shoots, and most recently at the Singapore Fashion Week held in May 2015. Apart from making regular media appearances, Cha also offers her services to her clientele including multiple South Korean celebrities, such as actresses Park Min-young and Kim Ah-joong. She has also launched her own line of hair styling products and tools, named CHAHONG Hair System.

== Early life ==
Cha is the fifth of six children in her family, with four older sisters and one younger brother.

After Cha left college, she felt that she did not have a particular dream or passion to realise. While her siblings performed better in studies and managed to attain scholarships to study in universities, Cha did not perform as well in school. She did have a knack for arts, particularly in drawing, but no art academy was located near her family's residence and even if there was one, she would not have attended it anyway as it would cost money. Cha contemplated suicide by the sea of Busan but eventually retracted her decision, stating that "the sea appeared so beautiful" that it made her return home. Her aunt then recommended her to become a hairdresser, for fear that she would otherwise do something terrible with her life. That suggestion marked a turning point in Cha's life as she grew to become one of the most renowned hairdressers in South Korea.

Cha did not have the luxury of a smooth-sailing journey, first starting out as a part-time worker cum trainee at her aunt's hair salon, and during that period of time, she had to overcome many challenges to achieve her current status. Cha once suffered from vocal nodules as she spent hours practising speaking aloud on the rooftop, as her clients struggled to hear her low voice. She also developed atopy and suffered from atopic dermatitis during her training, mainly due to the poor air quality in the hair salon and frequent exposure of cosmetic and hair products to her skin. Cha was recommended by her customer service manager to quit the job, but she was determined to continue, adjusting her dietary and sleeping habits to improve her skin condition instead. Despite the multiple obstacles, Cha grew a passion for the job, describing herself as being "amazed" every time she observed a client walk out of the hair salon after a complete makeover.

== Career ==
In August 2011, Cha started her first hair salon, and by September 2012, Cha had established her second branch in Gangnam, Seoul. During her time as a hairdresser, Cha realized the fact that her clients would only spend a few days every year to visit her hair salon so that she could style their hair for them. Cha wanted to provide a way for her clients to style their hair themselves when they are unable to visit her for her services, and started teaching them self-hair styling tips through videos and other means. These videos became popular and went viral on video-sharing websites not long after. During that period, a production staff member of South Korean variety show SBS Star King was interested in filming an episode on self-hair styling, and invited Cha to participate in the filming. She initially had to teach a model several self-hair styling techniques on the show, but was later recommended by the production staff to perform the demonstration on the show by herself instead. After the episode aired, Cha's name became the most searched keyword on the search engines for two consecutive days.

Apart from her official line of work, Cha has on several occasions visited local universities as a professor to give hairdressing classes. In 2011, Cha visited Seokyeong University, and made a similar trip to the Seoul Arts College in 2012.

In 2013, Cha was invited to be one of the pageant judges for the year's Miss Korea.

== Volunteer work ==
Cha is an advocate of voluntary work, encouraging her employees to participate as well. Cha's voluntary work focuses mainly on children with disabilities, offering hairdressing services to these children without charge. She is also involved in environmental protection work, largely due to her history of skin problems. Additionally, Cha frequently encourages celebrities, clients and employees to donate items for charity sales, thereafter donating the proceeds and unsold items to charity.

== Personal life ==
Cha has been married since 2008, having first met her husband in 2006 as colleagues at the same workplace. Her husband is Han Pil-su (Hangul: 한필수), a director of the CHAHONG ARDOR beauty salon chain as well as the CHAHONG ARDOR Academy, both entities jointly managed by the pair. Before Han met Cha back in South Korea, he lived in England, where he studied and worked as a hair designer. Han was employed as a hairstylist at one of Aveda's salons in London, before moving to Weybridge where he served as a director under the Toni&Guy group. In a television broadcast, Cha admitted having initially made the first move to pursue her husband after growing a love interest in him. Her husband made his first public appearance alongside Cha in 2013, when the pair featured as guests on one of MBC's programs, 사람이다Q.

In October 2015, Cha announced that she was five months into pregnancy and would minimize her public appearances until the child was due.

== Filmography ==
=== Variety show ===
Year	Title	Role	Network
2013	Star King	Guest	SBS
2013	Vitamin	Guest	KBS2
2013	여유만만	Guest	KBS2
2013	사람이다Q	Guest	MBC
2013	Get It Beauty	Guest	Channel M
2013	오천만의 대질문	Guest	Channel M
2014	Live Today	Guest	SBS
2014	Beauty Bible	Guest	KBS W
2014	Cultural Center	Guest	EBS
2014	살림의신 시즌2	Guest	JTBC
2015	The INNERview	Guest	Arirang
2015	My Little Television	Cast	MBC

== Media ==
=== Radio ===
Year	Title	Role	Network
2013	Radio Dream	Guest	EBS
2013	최화정's Power Time	Guest	SBS

== Publications ==
Year	Title
2011	차홍의 셀프 동안 헤어법
2012	파워풀 헤어 성형

== Awards ==
Year	Award
2007	L'Oréal Colour Trophy - Fashion Leader Award
2007	L'Oréal Colour Trophy - Grand Prize
2014	세종대왕 나눔봉사 대상
2014	소비자의 선택 브랜드대상 (Joong-ang Ilbo)
2015	국가소비자중심 브랜드대상 (Dong-a Ilbo)
2015	소비자의 선 브랜드대상 (Joong-ang Ilbo)
