= Chunja (singer) =

Chunja (춘자)
- Birth name: Hong Su-yeon (홍수연)
- Born: 5 April 1976 (age 49)
- Genres: R&B, pop, rock, soul, dance
- Occupation: Singer
- Instrument: Vocals
- Years active: 2004-present

Hong Su-yeon (born 5 April 1976), better known by her stage name Chunja, is a South Korean singer known for her androgynous appearance. She debuted in 2004 and won the 2006 M-Net award for best single, as well as the 2004 award for best new artist.

== Biography ==
The music video for her song "It's only a woman when you have pretty breasts" gained interest after Nam Hee-suk directed the music video.

== Awards ==
- 2004: Mnet Asian Music Awards - Best New Female Artist

== Personal life ==
She grew up in a South Korean town named Sanbon.
