= Code: Secret Room =

- Promotional poster for the first season
- Genre: Reality; Game
- Country of origin: South Korea
- Original language: Korean
- No. of seasons: 2
- No. of episodes: 13

Original release
- Network: JTBC
- Release: January 1 – March 25, 2016

Code - Secret Room (Korean: 코드 - 비밀의 방) is a South Korean reality game show. It aired on JTBC on Fridays at 23:00 beginning January 1, 2016. In each episodes, the contestants aim to solve the Main Code to allow them to escape the room. Clues to deciphering the Main Code are found by solving hidden puzzles throughout the set with theme setting rooms. The first to escape the room will move on to the next round and given a clue to the Main Code at the start of the next round. The last four contestants left in the room must compete in the Last Code match wherein they must solve a final puzzle, the last to do so is eliminated. The first season aired between January 1, 2016 to February 12, 2016.

At the last episode of the first season, the winner was given the option to choose between taking the prize and end of story OR continue competing and stand to win double the reward prize should he/she emerge as the winner.

The winner opted for a continuation and it kick started the second season. Unlike the first season of competing alone as an individual, it is now a team match. Each team is made up of 2 people. Similar to the format of first season, the Code consisted of the Main Code and Last Code. The first two team to complete the Main Code will move on to the next round and the remaining teams will battle it out. The second season aired between February 12, 2016 to March 25, 2016.

== Season 1 ==
=== Contestants ===
- Kim Hee-chul (singer)
- Baek Sung-hyun (actor)
- Seo Yu-ri (television personality, voice actress)
- Shin Jae-pyung (singer)
- Oh Hyun-min (television personality)
- Lee Yong-jin (comedian)
- Jeong Jun-ha (television personality, comedian)
- Ji Joo-yeon (actress)
- Choi Song-hyun (actress)
- Han Seok-joon (television personality)

=== Elimination Chart ===
| Ranking | Contestants | Rounds | | | | | | | | | MC WIN | LC WIN |
| Ranking | Contestants | 1 | 2 | 3 | 4 | 5 | 6 | 7 | 8 | FC | MC WIN | LC WIN |
|---|---|---|---|---|---|---|---|---|---|---|---|---|
| 1 | Oh Hyun-min | 1st | 5th | 1st | 1st | 5th | 1st | 1st | 1st | Winner | 6 | 1 |
| 2 | Jeong Jun-ha | 4th | 6th | 6th | 2nd | 4th | 4th | 3rd | 2nd | Runner-Up | 0 | 5 |
| 3 | Shin Jae-pyung | 7th | 4th | 2nd | 4th | 1st | 2nd | 1st | ELIM | | 2 | 2 |
| 4 | Kim Hee-chul | 5th | 1st | 3rd | 4th | 2nd | 3rd | ELIM | | | 1 | 2 |
| 5 | Baek Sung-hyun | 9th | 3rd | 7th | 3rd | 3rd | ELIM | | | | 1 | 2 |
| 6 | Lee Yong-jin | 6th | 2nd | 4th | 4th | ELIM | | | | | 0 | 1 |
| 7 | Choi Song-hyun | 8th | 8th | 5th | ELIM | | | | | | 0 | 3 |
| 8 | Seo Yu-ri | 3rd | 7th | ELIM | | | | | | | 0 | 1 |
| 9 | Han Seok-joon | 2nd | ELIM | | | | | | | | 0 | 0 |
| 10 | Ji Joo-yeon | ELIM | | | | | | | | | 0 | 0 |

== Season 2 ==
=== Contestants ===
- Oh Hyun-min (television personality) & Han Seok-joon (television personality)
- P-type (rapper) & San E (rapper)
- Hong Jin-kyung (actress) & Han Byul (singer)
- Eddy Kim (singer) & Choi Sung-joon (actor)
- Choi Jung-moon (television personality) & Miryo (rapper)
- Kang Ji-yeong (announcer) & Jang Sung-gyu (announcer)

=== Elimination Chart ===
| Ranking | Contestants | Rounds | | | | | MC WIN | LC WIN |
| Ranking | Contestants | 1 | 2 | 3 | 4 | FC | MC WIN | LC WIN |
|---|---|---|---|---|---|---|---|---|
| 1 | Oh Hyun-min & Han Seok-joon | 1st | 2nd | 1st | 2nd | Winner | 2 | 1 |
| 2 | Eddy Kim & Choi Sung-joon | 3rd | 3rd | 1st | 1st | Runner-Up | 2 | 2 |
| 3 | P-type & San E | 4th | 1st | 3rd | ELIM | | 1 | 2 |
| 4 | Kang Ji-yeong & Jang Sung-gyu | 2nd | 3rd | ELIM | | | 0 | 1 |
| 5 | Choi Jung-moon & Miryo | 5th | ELIM | | | | 0 | 1 |
| 6 | Hong Jin-kyung & Han Byul | ELIM | | | | | 0 | 0 |

== Ratings ==
| Ep. | Broadcast date | AGB Nielsen |
|---|---|---|
| 1 | January 1, 2016 | 1.146% |
| 2 | January 8, 2016 | 0.613% |
| 3 | January 15, 2016 | —N/a |
| 4 | January 22, 2016 | 0.690% |
| 5 | January 29, 2016 | 0.980% |
| 6 | February 5, 2016 | 0.995% |
| 7 | February 12, 2016 | 0.909% |
| 8 | February 19, 2016 | —N/a |
| 9 | February 26, 2016 | 0.828% |
| 10 | March 4, 2016 | 0.637% |
| 11 | March 11, 2016 | 0.449% |
| 12 | March 18, 2016 | 0.592% |
| 13 | March 25, 2016 | 0.534% |
