= Video Star =

- Video Star Logo Sai
- Genre: Talk show
- Directed by: Park Sung-ho
- Presented by: Kim Sook; Park Na-rae; Park So-hyun; Sandara Park
- Country of origin: South Korea
- Original language: Korean
- No. of seasons: 2
- No. of episodes: 215 (list of episodes)

Production
- Executive producer: Jo Beom
- Producers: Lee Yoo-jeong; Yoo Han-sung; Yoo Yeong-ho; Kang Sang-gu; Lee Sang-hyuk; Jung Da-oon; Hyun Yoo-seok; Song Ho-chan; Chae Su-guang
- Production location: South Korea
- Running time: 90 minutes

Original release
- Network: MBC every1
- Release: July 12, 2016 – present

Related
- Radio Star

Video Star (Korean: 비디오스타) is a South Korean talk show hosted by Kim Sook, Park Na-rae, Park So-hyun, and Sandara Park. It airs on the MBC cable channel MBC every1 on Tuesdays at 20:30 (KST). The first episode aired on July 12, 2016.

Video Star is a spin-off program based on the concept of the MBC program Radio Star.

== Cast ==
=== Host ===
- Current hosts:
  - Kim Sook (Episode 1 - present)
  - Park Na-rae (Episode 1 - present)
  - Park So-hyun (Episode 1 - present)
  - Sandara Park (Episode 130 - present)
- Former hosts:
  - Cao Lu (Episode 1 – 14)
  - Jun Hyo-seong (Episode 15 – 90)
  - Sunny (Episode 91 – 115)
  - Kim Min-young as (Cameo)
