= You Are the Only One (TV series) =

2014–2015 South Korean daily drama

- Promotional poster
- Also known as: Only You, My Love
- Genre: Romance; Family; Melodrama
- Written by: Go Bong-hwang
- Directed by: Jin Hyung-wook; Park Jin-seok
- Starring: Han Chae-ah; Sung Hyuk; Ji Joo-yeon
- Composer: Eom Gi-yeop
- Country of origin: South Korea
- Original language: Korean
- No. of episodes: 120

Production
- Executive producer: Kang Byeong-taek
- Cinematography: Lee Min-woong
- Editor: Cheon Yoon-young
- Running time: 30 minutes

Original release
- Network: KBS1
- Release: November 24, 2014 – May 22, 2015

You Are the Only One (Korean: 당신만이 내사랑; RR: Dangsinmani naesarang; lit. 'Only You, My Love') is a 2014 South Korean daily drama starring Han Chae-ah, Sung Hyuk and Ji Joo-yeon. It airs on KBS1 on Mondays to Fridays at 20:25 for 120 episodes beginning November 24, 2014, and ended May 22, 2015.

== Plot ==
Owner chef Lee Ji-gun (Sung Hyuk) grew up seeing how his father's numerous affairs have affected his family and hurts his mother. He is afraid of getting into serious relationships and swears off marriage. However, all changed when he meets TV cooking show producer Song Do-won (Han Chae-ah) and falls for her.

== Cast ==
=== Main characters ===
- Han Chae-ah as Song Do-won
- Sung Hyuk as Lee Ji-gun
- Ji Joo-yeon as Nam Hye-ri

=== Supporting characters ===
- Kang Nam-gil as Song Deok-goo
- Jung Han-yong as Lee Byeong-tae
- Moon Hee-kyung as Park Joo-ran
- Han Yoo-yi as Lee Ji-ae
- Kim Min-kyo as Verillio Lee Nam-soon, a Kopino
- Lee Hyo-chun as Ji Soo-yeon
- Lee Young-ha as Nam Je-il
- Sa Mi-ja as Kang Boo-nam
- Kang Shin-hyo as Nam Hye-sung
- Yoo Seung-bong as a television director
- Jang Joon-hak
- Kim Hae-sook as Oh Mal-soo
- Choi Dae-chul as Noh Young-gi
- Kang Joo-eun as Noh Woo-ri
- Kyung In-sun
- Kim Ki-du
- Ahn Jae-min
- Hwang Kyung-hee

== Viewership ==
=== 2014 ===
List of ratings (episode 1-28)

Episode	Original Airdate	TNmS Ratings		AGB Ratings	
Episode	Original Airdate	Nationwide	Seoul National Capital Area	Nationwide	Seoul National Capital Area
1	November 24	25.6%	22.5%	24.1%	23.2%
2	November 25	23.9%	21.4%	25.0%	24.2%
3	November 26	22.0%	19.8%	21.7%	21.6%
4	November 27	24.6%	21.8%	23.0%	22.5%
5	November 28	23.1%	21.1%	21.7%	20.4%
6	December 1	24.3%	20.8%	24.3%	23.6%
7	December 2	25.7%	23.0%	24.7%	23.7%
8	December 3	23.5%	21.3%	23.3%	22.7%
9	December 4	25.5%	22.0%	24.8%	24.1%
10	December 5	23.6%	20.1%	23.5%	22.9%
11	December 8	25.2%	22.0%	24.3%	24.5%
12	December 9	24.3%	22.0%	25.3%	25.0%
13	December 10	23.9%	22.6%	24.3%	24.5%
14	December 11	24.6%	22.3%	24.5%	23.5%
15	December 12	21.8%	18.5%	23.5%	22.0%
16	December 15	25.2%	22.8%	24.8%	24.1%
17	December 16	25.2%	22.3%	23.7%	23.6%
18	December 17	24.9%	21.9%	23.7%	22.9%
19	December 18	24.3%	22.3%	25.2%	24.5%
20	December 19	23.6%	21.2%	20.9%	20.7%
21	December 22	26.2%	24.2%	25.1%	24.5%
22	December 23	24.8%	22.2%	23.9%	23.3%
23	December 24	22.8%	20.7%	23.1%	23.0%
24	December 25	25.0%	22.4%	24.9%	23.4%
25	December 26	23.5%	20.3%	23.8%	22.9%
26	December 29	25.7%	22.9%	25.2%	24.6%
27	December 30	25.6%	23.0%	23.9%	24.1%
28	December 31	22.7%	22.1%	22.5%	21.5%

=== 2015 ===
List of ratings (episode 29-120)

Episode	Original Airdate	TNmS Ratings		AGB Ratings	
Episode	Original Airdate	Nationwide	Seoul National Capital Area	Nationwide	Seoul National Capital Area
29	January 1	24.3%	22.9%	23.7%	22.0%
30	January 2	25.0%	22.1%	24.0%	22.9%
31	January 5	%	%	%	%
32	January 6	%	%	%	%
33	January 7	%	%	%	%
34	January 8	%	%	%	%
35	January 9	%	%	%	%
36	January 12	%	%	%	%
37	January 13	%	%	%	%
38	January 14	%	%	%	%
39	January 15	%	%	%	%
40	January 16	%	%	%	%
41	January 19	%	%	%	%
42	January 20	%	%	%	%
43	January 21	%	%	%	%
44	January 22	%	%	%	%
45	January 23	%	%	%	%
46	January 26	%	%	%	%
47	January 27	%	%	%	%
48	January 28	%	%	%	%
49	January 29	%	%	%	%
50	January 30	%	%	%	%
51		%	%	%	%
52		%	%	%	%
53		%	%	%	%
54		%	%	%	%
55		%	%	%	%
56		%	%	%	%
57		%	%	%	%
58		%	%	%	%
59		%	%	%	%
60		%	%	%	%
61		%	%	%	%
62		%	%	%	%
63		%	%	%	%
64		%	%	%	%
65		%	%	%	%
66		%	%	%	%
67		%	%	%	%
68		%	%	%	%
69		%	%	%	%
70		%	%	%	%
71		%	%	%	%
72		%	%	%	%
73		%	%	%	%
74		%	%	%	%
75		%	%	%	%
76		%	%	%	%
77		%	%	%	%
78		%	%	%	%
79		%	%	%	%
80		%	%	%	%
81		%	%	%	%
82		%	%	%	%
83		%	%	%	%
84		%	%	%	%
85		%	%	%	%
86		%	%	%	%
87		%	%	%	%
88		%	%	%	%
89		%	%	%	%
90		%	%	%	%
91		%	%	%	%
92		%	%	%	%
93		%	%	%	%
94		%	%	%	%
95		%	%	%	%
96		%	%	%	%
97		%	%	%	%
98		%	%	%	%
99		%	%	%	%
100		%	%	%	%
101		%	%	%	%
102		%	%	%	%
103		%	%	%	%
104		%	%	%	%
105		%	%	%	%
106		%	%	%	%
107		%	%	%	%
108		%	%	%	%
109		%	%	%	%
110		%	%	%	%
111		%	%	%	%
112		%	%	%	%
113		%	%	%	%
114		%	%	%	%
115		%	%	%	%
116		%	%	%	%
117		%	%	%	%
118		%	%	%	%
119		%	%	%	%
120		%	%	%	%
