= Han Suk-joon =

South Korean television personality

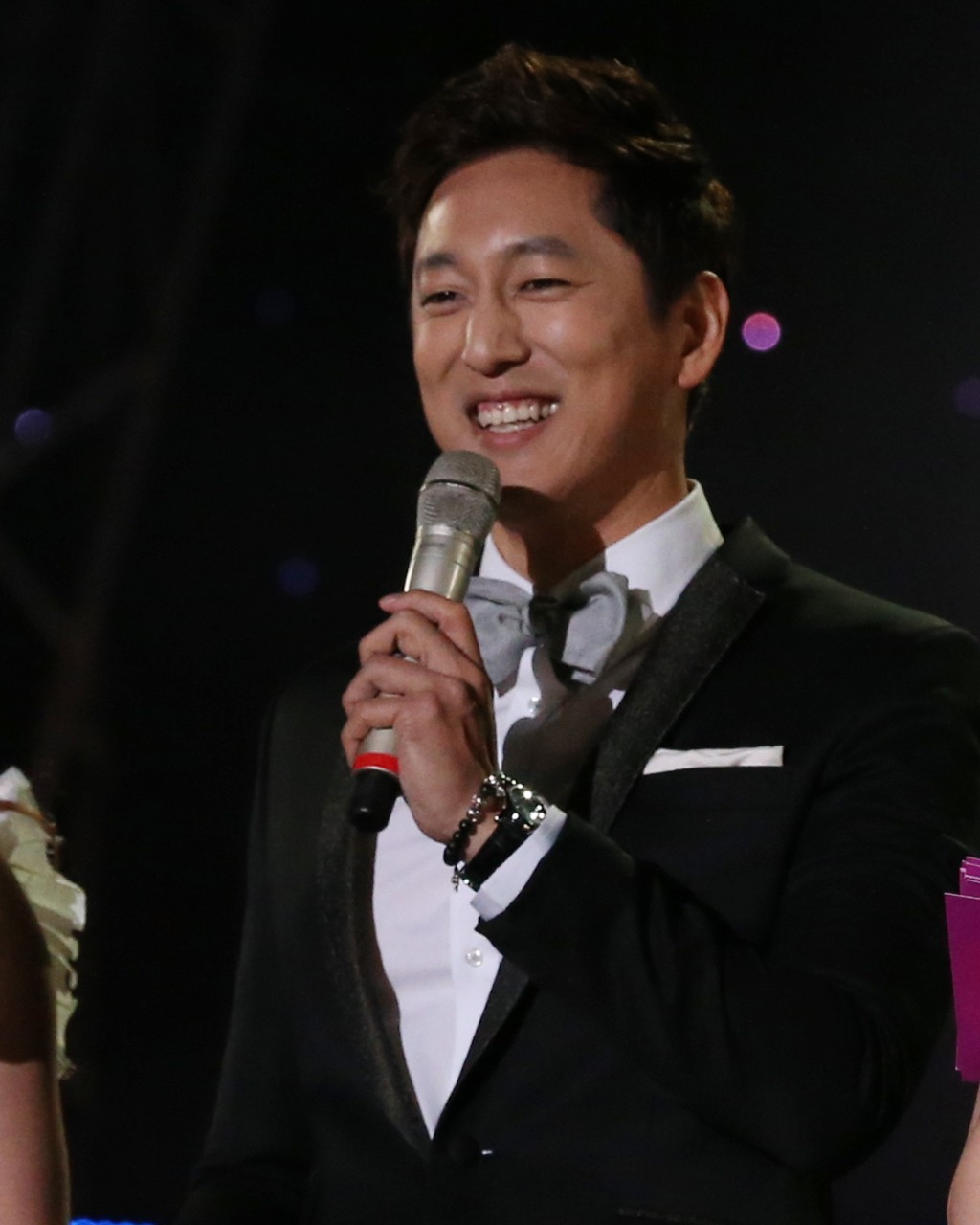
- Born: June 11, 1975 (age 51); South Korea
- Occupation: Television personality
- Years active: 2003-present
- Agent: SM C&C
- Spouses: Kim Mi-jin (m. 2006; div. 2013) Im Hye-ran (m. 2018)
- Children: 1

Korean name
- Hangul: 한석준
- Hanja: 韓錫俊
- RR: Han Seokjun
- MR: Han Sŏkchun

Han Suk-joon (born June 11, 1975) is a South Korean television personality and former announcer. He also appeared in Code - Secret Room in 2016.

Han was previously married to news anchor Kim Mi-jin. He remarried in April 2018. Their daughter was born in October 2018 and briefly appeared on The Return of Superman with her father.

== Awards and nominations ==
Year	Award	Category	Result	Ref.
2007	6th KBS Entertainment Awards	Best Newcomer Award for male MC/comedian	Won	
