= Sung Hyuk =

South Korean actor

- Born: Hong Sung-hyuk; March 2, 1984 (age 42); South Korea
- Occupation: Actor
- Years active: 2005–present
- Agent: FNC Entertainment
- Spouse: Unknown (m. 2022)

Korean name
- Hangul: 홍성혁
- RR: Hong Seonghyeok
- MR: Hong Sŏnghyŏk

Sung Hyuk (born Hong Sung-hyuk on March 2, 1984) is a South Korean actor. He made his acting debut in 2005, and has starred in the television dramas Jang Bo-ri is Here! and You Are the Only One.

== Personal life ==
On September 26, 2022, Sung's agency announced that he will marry his non-celebrity girlfriend on October 21 in Seoul.

== Filmography ==
=== Television series ===
Year	Title	Role
2005	Let's Go to the Beach	
2008	Don't Be Swayed	Park Dong-hyuk
2010	Oh! My Lady	
2010	Please Marry Me	Kim Kang-ho
2014	Bride of the Century	Jang Yi-hyun
2014	Jang Bo-ri Is Here!	Moon Ji-sang
2014	You Are the Only One	Lee Ji-gun
2017	A Korean Odyssey	Dong Jang-goon
2019	Trap	Hunter
2020	365: Repeat the Year	Kim Dae-sung
2020	Good Casting	Kwon Min-seok
2020	Kingmaker: The Change of Destiny	Chae In-kyu
2021	Imitation	Best New Actor Nominee (Cameo, Ep. 1)
2022	Connect	Min-sook
2026	Sword and Silence	Su-se

=== Film ===
Year	Title	Role
2010	Bloody Shake	Chan-woo
2013	Good Friends	Hyun-soo
2016	Operation Chromite	Song Sang-deuk
2019	Start-Up	Park Doo-man
2021	Recalled	
2022	Birth	

=== Music video appearances ===
Year	Song title	Artist
2009	"Sorry"	Lee Jin-sung
2010	"Stars in the Night Sky"	Yang Jung-seung

=== Variety show ===
Year	Title	Notes
2014	Our Neighborhood Arts and Physical Education	Team member, Episodes 70-84
2016	Real Men	Cast member, Manly Men special
2018	King of Mask Singer	Contestant, Episode 161 (Andy Warhol)

== Awards and nominations ==
Year	Award	Category	Nominated work	Result
2014	22nd Korea Culture and Entertainment Awards	Best New Actor in a Drama	Jang Bo-ri is Here!	Won
