= Lee Yong-jin =

South Korean entertainer (born 1985)

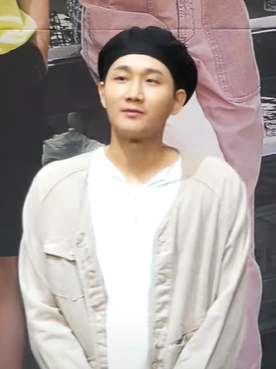
- Born: November 18, 1985 (age 40); Hwaseong, Gyeonggi Province, South Korea

Comedy career
- Years active: 2003–present

Korean name
- Hangul: 이용진
- Hanja: 李龍眞
- RR: I Yongjin
- MR: I Yongjin

Lee Yong-jin (Korean: 이용진; born on November 18, 1985) is a South Korean comedian and singer. He is most known for his work on the tvN sketch comedy show Comedy Big League. Lee also owns the sashimi restaurant 960 in Sokcho.

== Personal life ==
Lee married on April 14, 2019. The couple's only child, son Yoon-jae, was born on September 19, 2019.

On February 9, 2023, Lee donated 30 million won to help 2023 Turkey–Syria earthquake, by donating money through Korean Red Cross.

== Filmography ==
=== Music videos ===
Year	Title	Artists	Ref
2017	Hot Sugar (뜨거운 여름)	Turbo	

=== Dramas ===
Year	Title	Role
2013	Reply 1994	Cameo
2015	Angry Mom	Cameo, as a taxi driver
2018	The Rich Son	Cameo
2020	Kkondae Intern	Cameo

=== Television shows ===
Year	Title	Notes
2005–2009	People Looking for a Laugh	Cast member
2011–present	Comedy Big League	Cast member
2012–2013	Beatles' Code Season 2	Host
2012–2013	Visual Suspect	Host
2012	Cats and Dogs	Cast member
2012	Wind Up	Cast member
2012	Saturday Talk League	Cast member
2013	Roller Coaster Season 3	Cast member
2013–2014	Who Are You?	Host
2015	Misaengmul	as Han Seok-yool, Misaeng parody
2015	Time House	Cast member
2016	Code: Secret Room	Contestant
2016	Global Comedy Show	Cast member
2017	Battle Trip	Contestant with Yang Se-chan
2018–2019	2 Days & 1 Night S3	Intern
2019	Na Na Land	Co-host with DinDin and Haha
2019	Wanna Play? GG	
2019	Player 7 S1	Cast member
2019–2020	More Salty Tour	Cast member
2020–present	Friendly Variety Show	Cast member
2021	Come Back Home	Cast member
2021	With God	Host
2021	With God Season 2	Host
2021	Show Me the Money 10	Host
2021	Along with the Gods 2	Host
2022	Secret Tutoring of Hogu	Host
2022	One Tree Table	Cast Member
2022	Between Us	Host; with Yoo In-na and Aiki
2022	Queendom 2	Queen Manager
2022	Prefabricated Family	Host
2022	Along with the Gods 3	Host
2022	Pure Fighter	Host
2023	No Math School Trip	Cast Member
2026–present	2 Days & 1 Night S4	Cast Member

=== Web shows ===
Year	Title	Role	Notes	Ref.
2021–2022	Transit Love	Panelist	Season 1–2	
2021–present	Turkeys on the Block	Host		
2022	Goblin Stealing Wisdom	Host		
2022	No Ki Deuk Zone	Cast Member		
2022	Mouth on Wheels	Cast Member	Season 2	
2024	Agents of Mystery	Cast Member		
2024	YongTarot	Host		

=== Hosting ===
Year	Title	Notes	Ref.
2021	2021 Melon Music Awards	with Park Sun-young	

== Ambassadorship ==
- Public Relations Ambassadors Hwaseong, Gyeonggi City (2023) with Lee Jin-ho

== Awards and nominations ==
Year	Award	Category	Result	Ref.
2006	SBS Comedy Awards	Experimenting Spirit Award	Won	
2007	SBS Entertainment Awards	Best Newcomer	Won	
2008	SBS Entertainment Awards	Best Award in Comedy	Won	
2012	Mnet 20's Choice	Gag Character	Won	
2022	Korea First Brand Award	Entertainer (Male)	Won	
2022	58th Baeksang Arts Awards	Best Male Variety Performer	Won	
2022	1st Blue Dragon Series Awards	Best Male Entertainer	Nominated	
2022	1st Blue Dragon Series Awards	Popular Star Award	Won	
