= Kim Sae-rom =

South Korean actress and model (born 1987)

- 김새롬
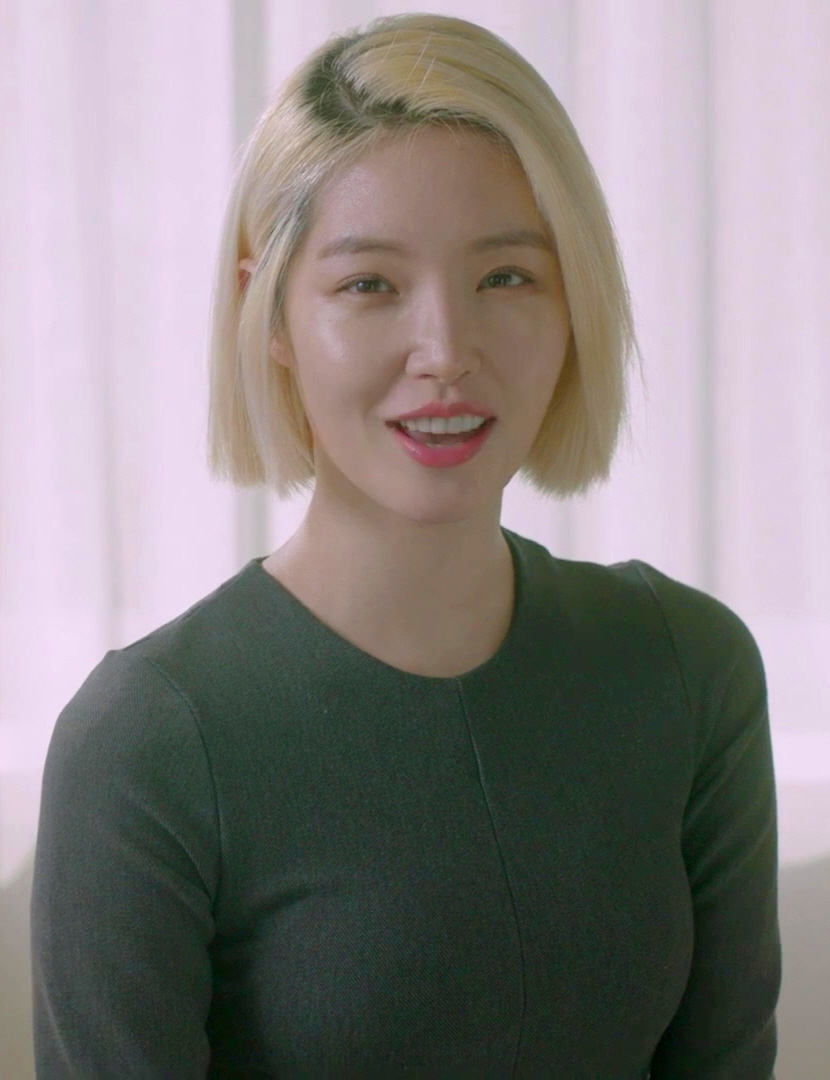
- Sae-rom in March 2016
- Born: 2 October 1987 (age 38); Seongnam, South Korea
- Occupation: Television personality
- Years active: 2004–present
- Agent: New-able
- Spouse: Lee Chan-o (m. 2015; div. 2017)

Kim Sae-rom (Korean: 김새롬; born October 2, 1987), is a South Korean television personality, model and actress.

== Personal life ==
She married chef Lee Chan-o on August 13, 2015. After about a year and four months after marriage, the reason for the divorce was known to be a difference in personality. They became completely separate in January 2017.

== Television ==
=== Variety shows ===
| Year | Title | Role | Note |
|---|---|---|---|
| 2016 | Talents for Sale | In-house buyer | Episodes 3 & 4 |
| 2022 | Queen of Wrestling | Player | |

== Awards and nominations ==
| Year | Award | Category | Nominated work | Result | Ref. |
|---|---|---|---|---|---|
| 2006 | MBC Entertainment Awards | Best Newcomer Award | | Won | |
