= Ji Joo-yeon =

South Korean actress (born 1983)

- Born: February 8, 1983 (age 43); South Korea
- Occupation: Actress
- Years active: 2009–present

Korean name
- Hangul: 지주연
- Hanja: 池周娟
- RR: Ji Juyeon
- MR: Chi Chuyŏn

Ji Joo-yeon (Korean: 지주연; born February 8, 1983) is a South Korean actress. She is best known for her role in You Are the Only One. She also appeared Code: Secret Room in 2016.

== Filmography ==
=== Television series ===
Year	Title	Role	Notes	Ref.
2014	You Are the Only One	Nam Hye-ri		
2020	Soul Mechanic	Jung Se-yeon		
2022	Why Her	Jeong Hee-young		

=== Television show ===
Year	Title	Role	Ref.
2022	Trendy Talk	Host	
