= Seo Yu-ri =

South Korean actress and cosplayer (born 1985)

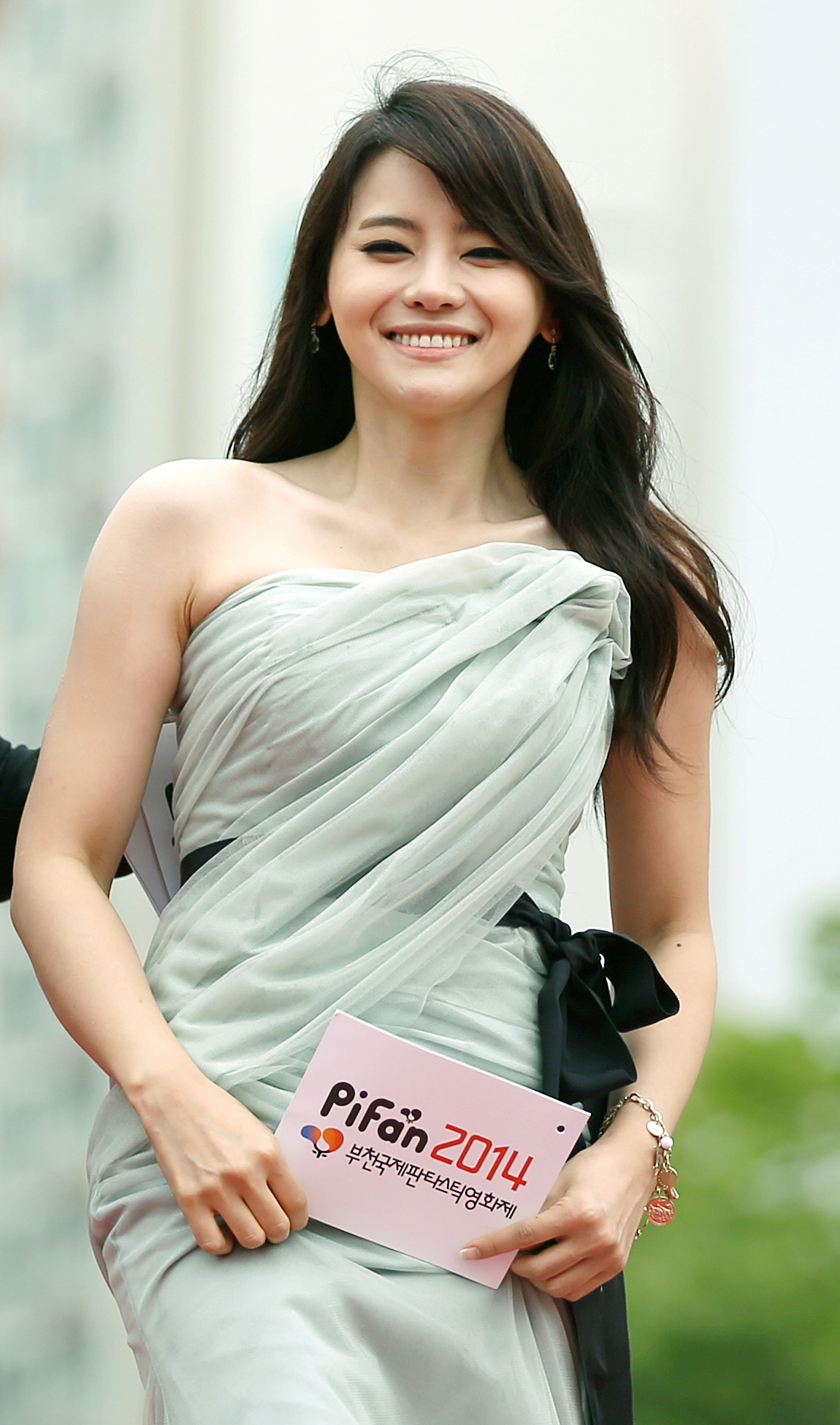
- Seo at the Bucheon International Fantastic Film Festival in 2014
- Born: Seo Yeong-eun; February 8, 1985 (age 41); Daegu, South Korea
- Occupations: Television and voice actress; cosplayer; video jockey
- Years active: 2008–present
- Height: 157 cm (5 ft 2 in)

Korean name
- Hangul: 서유리
- RR: Seo Yuri
- MR: Sŏ Yuri

Former name
- Hangul: 서영은
- RR: Seo Yeongeun
- MR: Sŏ Yŏngŭn

Seo Yu-ri (Korean: 서유리; born February 8, 1985) is a South Korean television and voice actress, cosplayer and video jockey.

She is known as a cast member on television shows, including Saturday Night Live Korea, a late-night live television sketch comedy and variety show; My Little Television; Code: Secret Room, a reality game show; and Sweet Revenge 2, a teen drama series.

== Filmography ==
=== Television ===
- CEO-dol Mart (TVING, 2023) – radio show host (episode 10)
- Sweet Revenge 2 (XtvN, 2018) – Kim Sun-Hee
- KBS Drama Special: "The Tuna and the Dolphin" (KBS2, 2018) – Park So-Jin
- Welcome to Waikiki (JTBC, 2018) – Seo Yu-Ri (episode 13)
- Don't Dare to Dream (SBS TV, 2016) – Hong Ji-Min
- You're All Surrounded (SBS TV, 2014) – club girl (episode 2; cameo)
- Reply 1994 (tvN, 2013) – Joo-Kyung (episode 12)

== See also ==
- List of cosplayers
- List of South Korean actresses
