= Nam Hee-suk =

South Korean comedian

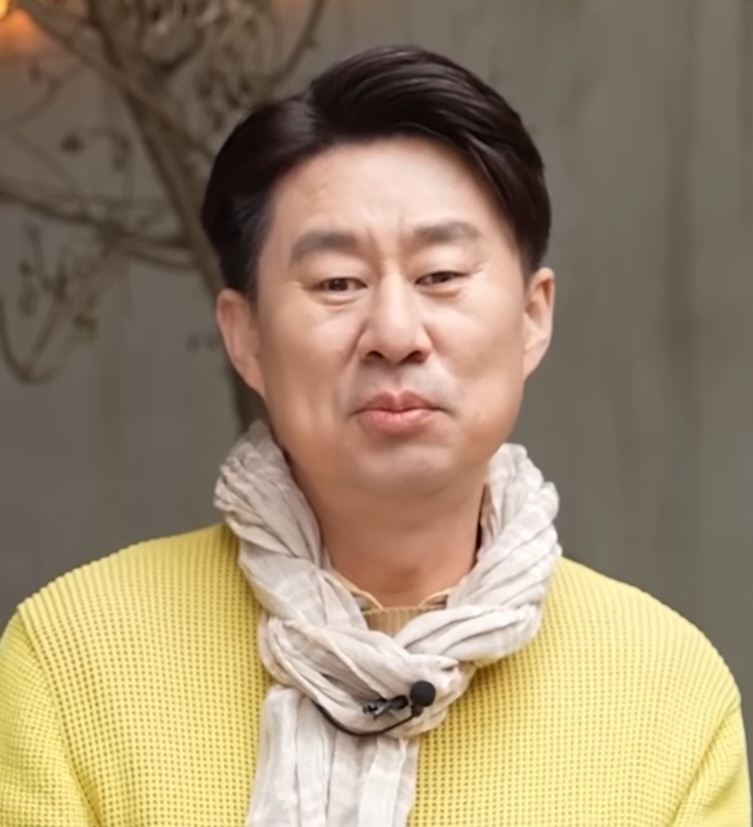
- Born: July 6, 1971 (age 55); Boryeong, South Korea

Comedy career
- Years active: 1991–present
- Medium: Stand-up, television
- Genres: Observational, Sketch, Wit, Parody, Slapstick, Dramatic, Sitcom

Nam Hee-suk (Korean: 남희석; born July 6, 1971) is a South Korean comedian. He also hosted Global Talk Show from 2006 to 2010.

== Filmography ==
=== Variety shows ===
- 2014: Running Man (guest, ep. 207)
- 2021: I'm Going to Meet You (Channel A, Host)

== Awards and nominations ==
- Won SBS 20th Anniversary Entertainment Top 10 Star Award in 2010 SBS Entertainment Awards
