= Haenyeo =

Female divers of Jeju, South Korea

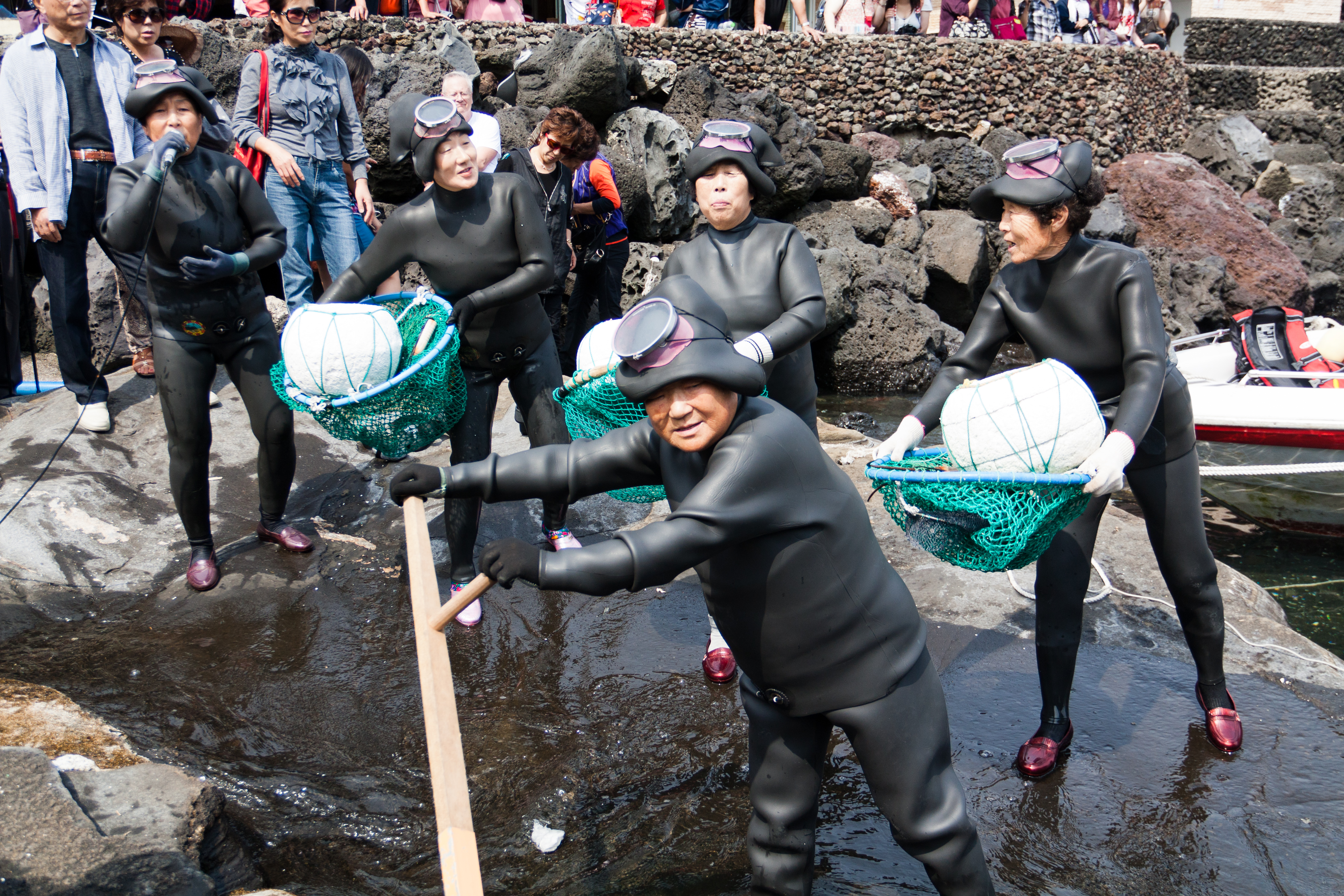
- A group of haenyeo women in wetsuits, with nets and flotation devices (2012)

Korean name
- Hangul: 해녀
- Hanja: 海女
- RR: haenyeo
- MR: haenyŏ

Haenyeo (Note: Also spelled haenyo) (Korean: 해녀; lit. 'sea women') are female divers in the South Korean province of Jeju, whose livelihood consists of harvesting a variety of mollusks, seaweed, and other sea life from the ocean. Known for their independent spirit and determination, haenyeo are representative of the semi-matriarchal family structure of Jeju.

== Activities ==
Traditionally, girls started training as haenyeo when they were 11 years old. Beginning in shallow water, trainees worked their way up to more challenging depths. After about seven years of training, a girl was considered a "full-fledged" haenyeo. Today, the oldest haenyeo are over 80 years old, and almost 90% are older than 60 years.

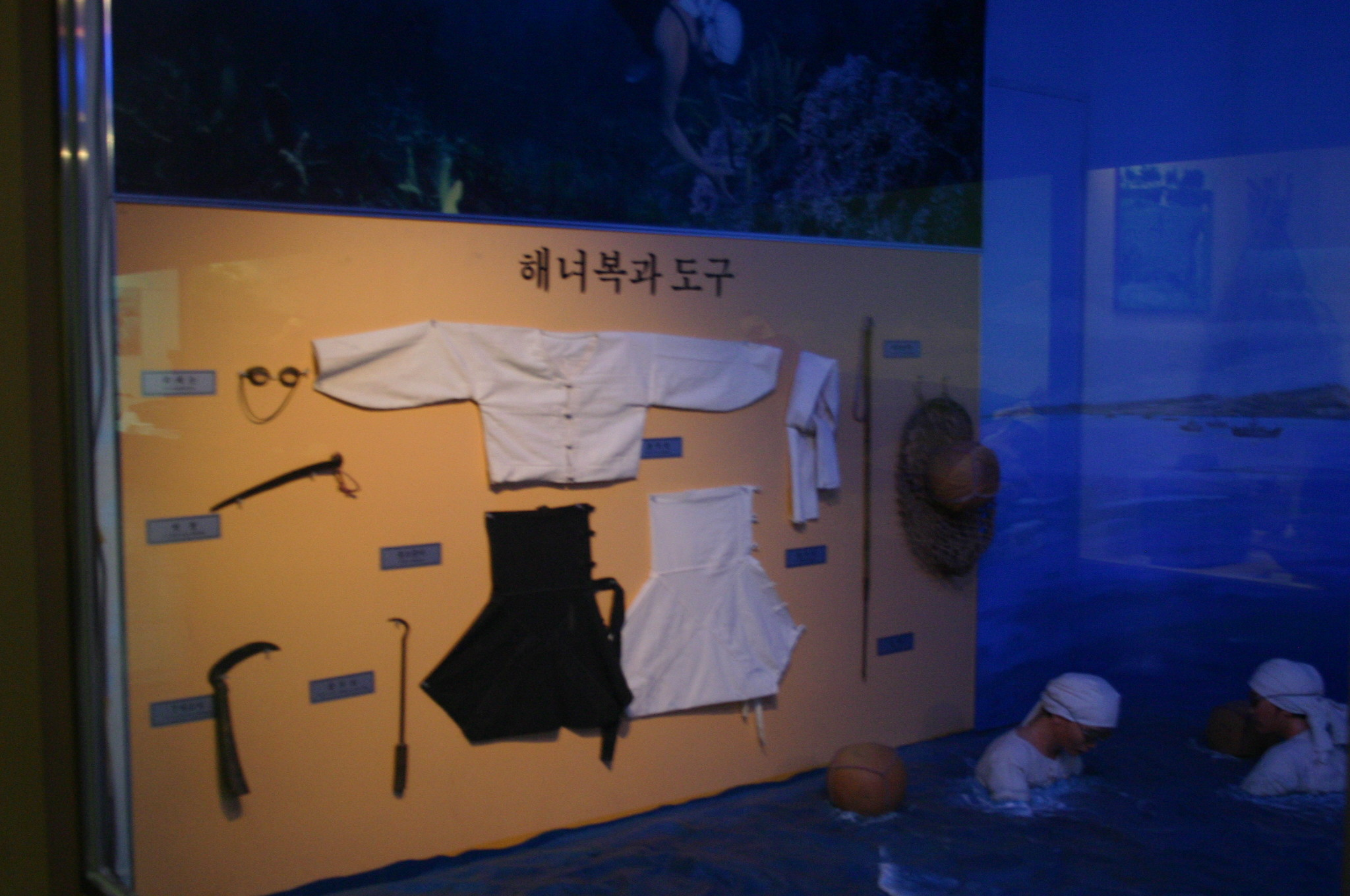
The traditional outfit and tools for haenyeo displayed at a museum in Jeju

All together, the tools of a haenyeo consist of a wetsuit, diving mask, fins, gloves, chest weights (or freediving weight belts, to assist diving), an L-shaped weeding hoe, and a net attached to a flotation device. The haenyeo stash their catch in these nets until they are done for the day.

How long the haenyeo spend in the water depends on the season. Before wetsuits were available, they wore cotton swimsuits, and haenyeo could stay in the water for only up to an hour at a time during the winter months. After an hour, they would get out of the water and sit by the fire for 3–4 hours to dry off. After this break, they would jump back into the water for another hour. During the summer months, however, they could stay in the water for up to 3 hours at a time before a break. Since the introduction of wetsuits, haenyeo can stay in the water for five to six hours at a time, even during the winter.

With each dive, haenyeo plunge up to 20 metres (66 ft) deep and hold their breath typically for 1–3 minutes, practicing a rapid, whistling breathing technique called 'sumbisori'. Their harvests can include abalone, conch, octopus, sea urchins, sea squirt, brown alga, top shell, a variety of sargassum, oysters, and sea slugs. The divers must contend with dangers such as jellyfish, poor weather and sharks.

== History ==
Jeju's diving tradition dates back to 434 AD. Originally, diving was an exclusively male profession, with the exception of women who worked alongside their husbands. The first mention of female divers in literature does not come until the 17th century, when a monograph of Jeju geography describes them as haenyeo (literally "diving women").

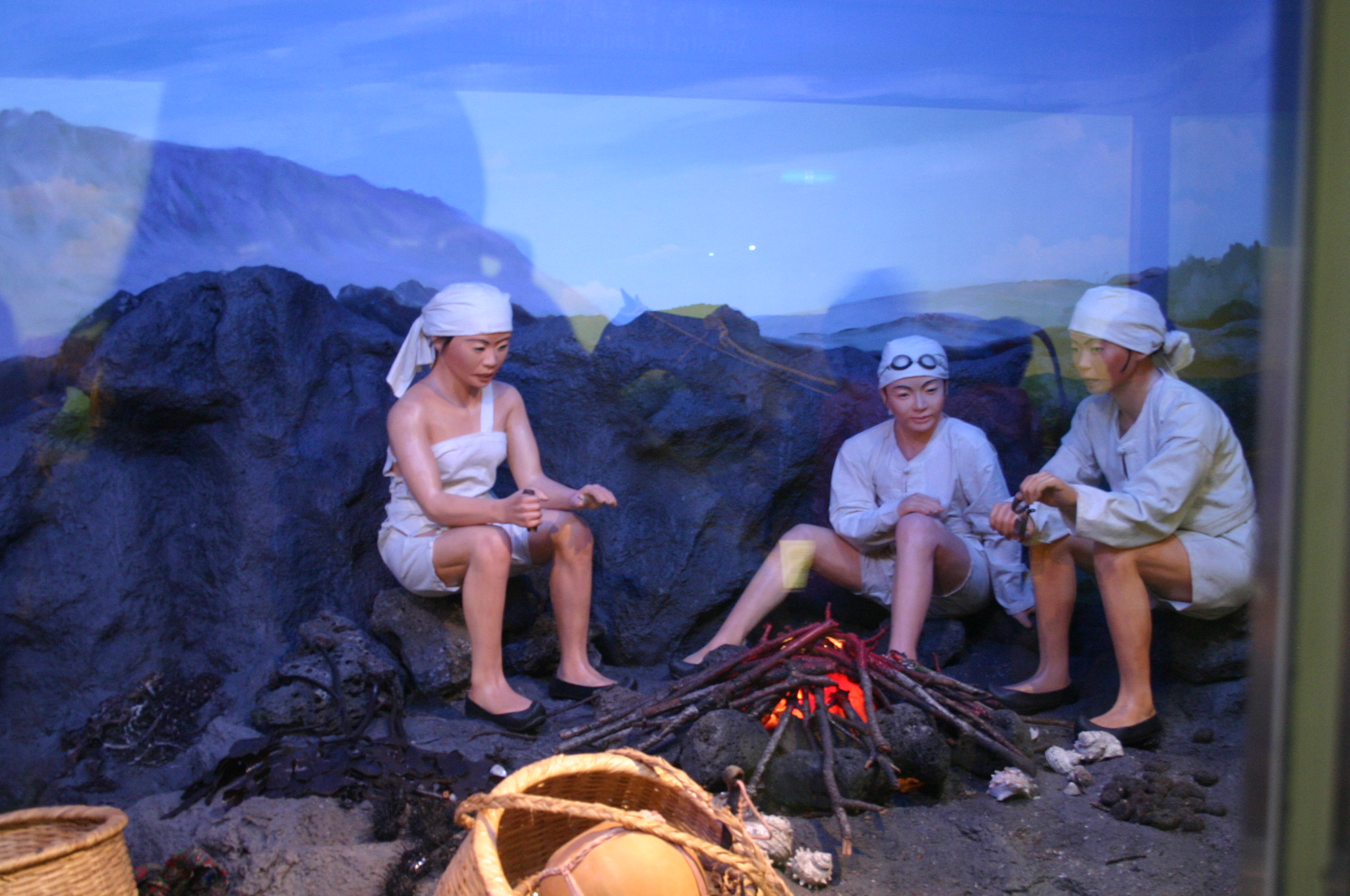
Museum diorama of haenyeo resting by the fire after finishing their work for the day

By the 18th century, female divers, at this point commonly referred to as haenyeo, outnumbered male divers. Several possible explanations exist for this shift. For instance, in the 17th century, a significant number of men died at sea due to war or deep-sea fishing accidents, meaning that diving became the work of women. Another explanation is that women tend to have more subcutaneous fat and a higher shivering threshold than men, making them better suited to work in cold waters. An 18th-century document records that taxes of dried abalone were imposed on ordinary people, forcing many women to dive in cold waters while pregnant.

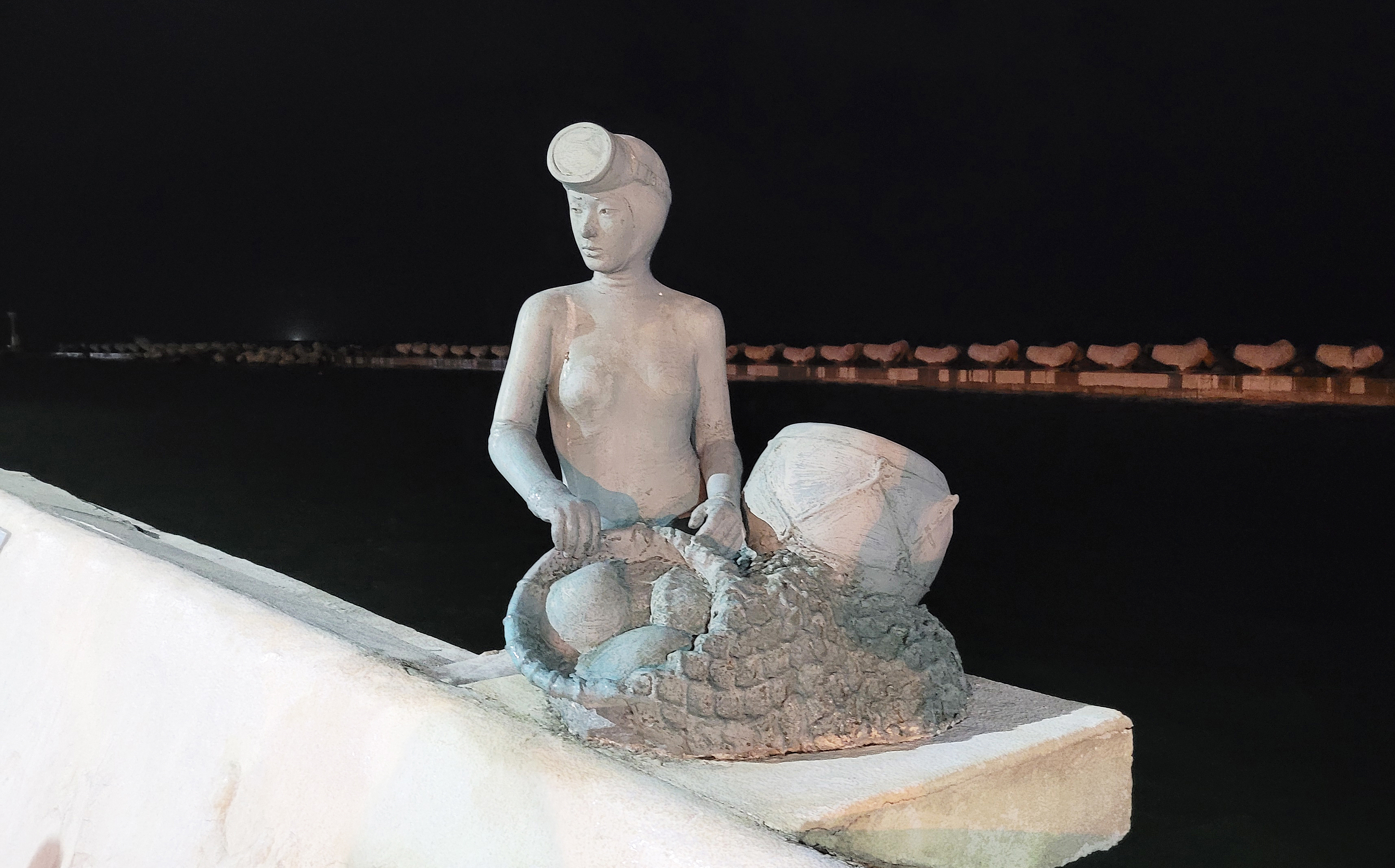
Statue of Hanyeo in Jeju City

As sea diving became a female-dominated industry, many of the haenyeo subsequently replaced their husbands as the primary laborers. This trend was especially prominent after the Japanese colonized Korea in 1910 and diving became much more lucrative. Up until this point, much of what the haenyeo harvested was given to the Joseon government as tribute. When the Japanese took over, however, they abolished this tradition, allowing haenyeo to sell their catch at market and make a profit. Additionally, Japanese and Korean merchants hired haenyeo to work for them in Japan and on the Korean mainland as wage-laborers, increasing their financial situations greatly. On Yeonpyeong-ri, an island near Incheon where many haenyeo worked, their wages, on average, constituted 40 to 48 percent of a typical family's total income. The prominent place of haenyeo in Jeju's economy and in their individual family units continued long after Japanese colonization. In the early 1960s, for example, haenyeo harvests accounted for 60% of Jeju's fisheries revenue, and 40% of haenyeo husbands remained unemployed.

=== Declining numbers ===
Like many other historical cultural practices, the sea-diving industry has fallen victim to industrialisation. Beginning in the 1960s, the Korean government sought ways to jumpstart the country's economy in every province. Because Jeju was not a practical place to build factories, the Korean government decided to turn it into an exporter of mandarin oranges. By 1969, a majority of rural workers had joined this new industry. Additionally, about 2% of all land in Jeju was dedicated to farming mandarin oranges. In the 1970s, the government launched another program to bolster Jeju's tourism industry. By 1978, tourism had surpassed agriculture as the island's largest industry.

All of this change had a significant impact on haenyeo numbers. Given less-strenuous alternatives, many women abandoned the sea-diving industry. In the five years between 1965 and 1970, numbers dropped from 23,081 to 14,143. In addition, education opportunities and attractive positions in emerging industries are considered to have deterred younger girls from becoming haenyeo. In 1970, 31% of haenyeo were 30 years old or younger, 55% were between 30 and 49 years old and only 14% were 50 or older. As of 2014, however, 98% of haenyeo were over the age of 50.

As the sea water temperature around the island of Jeju has gone up, the amount of seaweed, food for the abalone, has decreased, and there have been outbreaks of algae and jellyfish. Fears for the sustainability of marine resources have also been a factor in the decline in the number of sea-divers.

== In society ==
Because so many families relied on the haenyeo for the majority of their income, a semi-matriarchal society developed on Jeju with the haenyeo at the head of the household. On the tiny islets off the coast of Jeju, such as Mara Island, where sea-diving was the sole source of income, this reversal of traditional gender roles was fully realized; men would look after the children and go shopping while the women would bring in money for the family. Other manifestations of Jeju's unique society include men paying a dowry to the family of the bride (a reversal of the custom on the Korean mainland) and families celebrating the birth of girls over the birth of boys.

While certain elements of a matriarchal society surfaced in Jeju, they were not enough to completely overcome the predominance of Confucianism. As a result, beyond the domestic sphere, little else about Jeju society was different from what existed on the Korean mainland. For example, men filled all political leadership roles and were the only ones who could perform ancestor-worship ceremonies and inherit property and the familial line. Furthermore, during the era of colonial rule, haenyeo remained peasants, never moving up the chain to become small-business owners or managers of seafood manufacturing plants. Even in the home, most haenyeo remained the primary caregiver and handled at least half of the domestic chores.

Today, haenyeo are celebrated as one of Jeju's most-valued treasures. The Korean government shows its appreciation for the unique contributions of the haenyeo to Jeju's culture by subsidizing their gear and granting them exclusive rights to sell fresh seafood. In March 2014, the government asked the United Nations Educational, Scientific and Cultural Organization (UNESCO) to add the haenyeo to its Intangible Cultural Heritage List, and UNESCO did so in 2016.

== Gallery ==
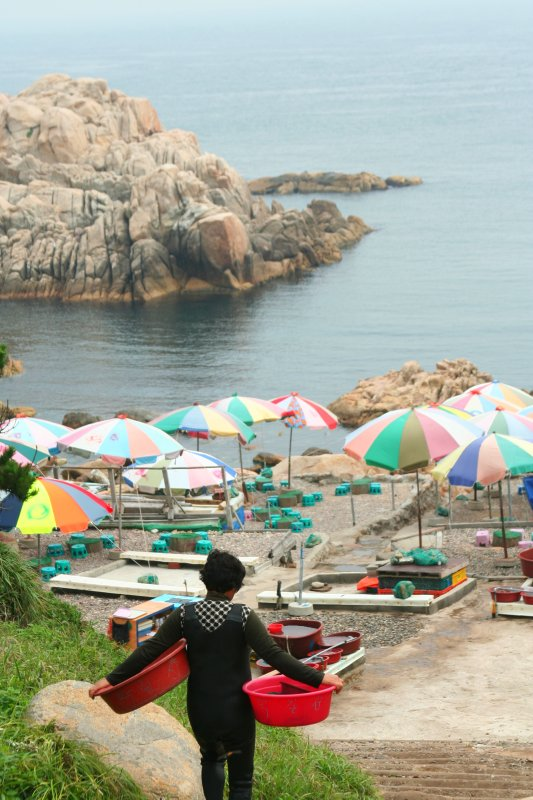
Haenyeo carrying baskets toward the sea in Ulsan

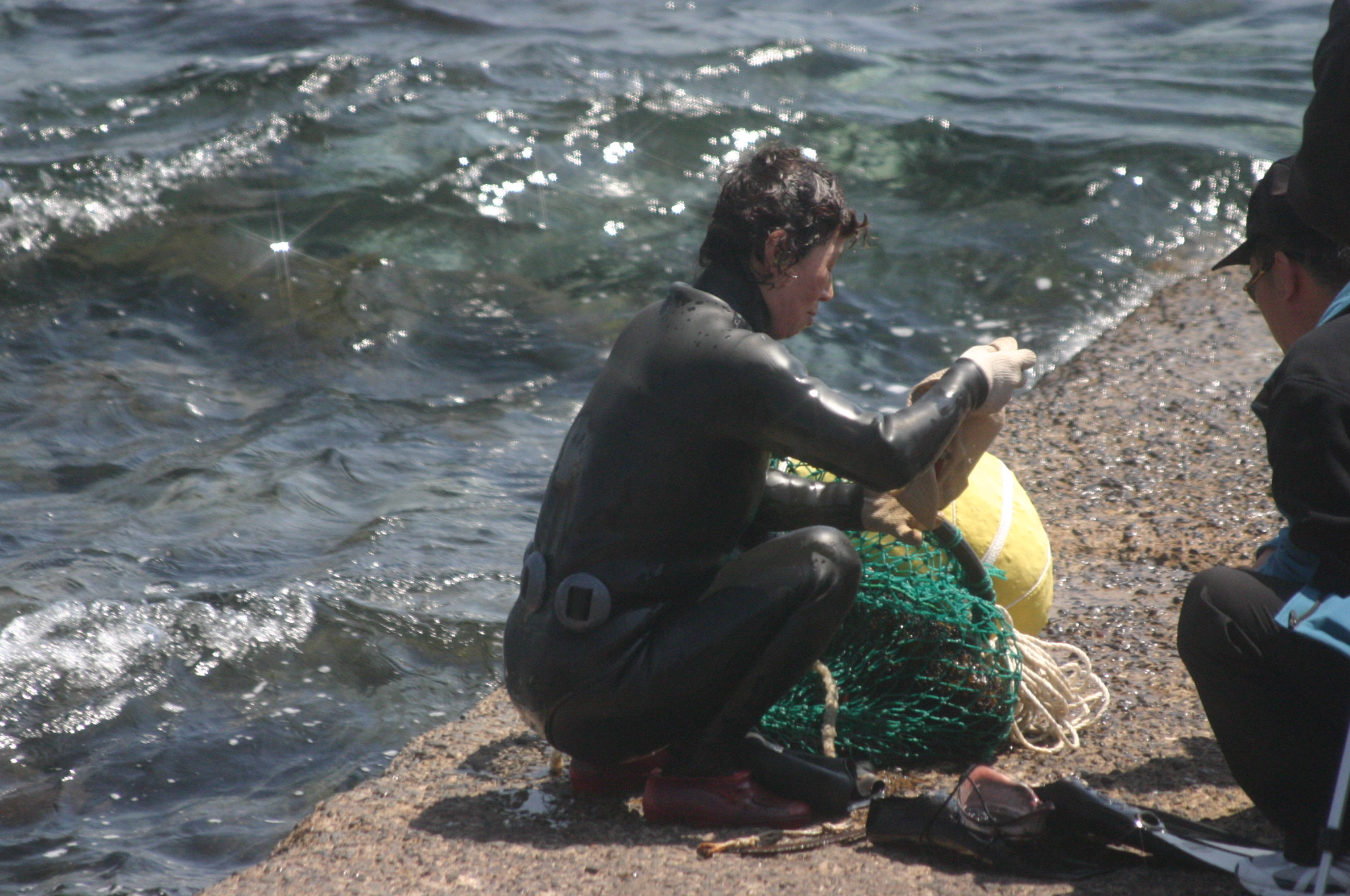
After emerging from the sea, haenyeo selling her gathered seafood to people on the coast of Jeju.

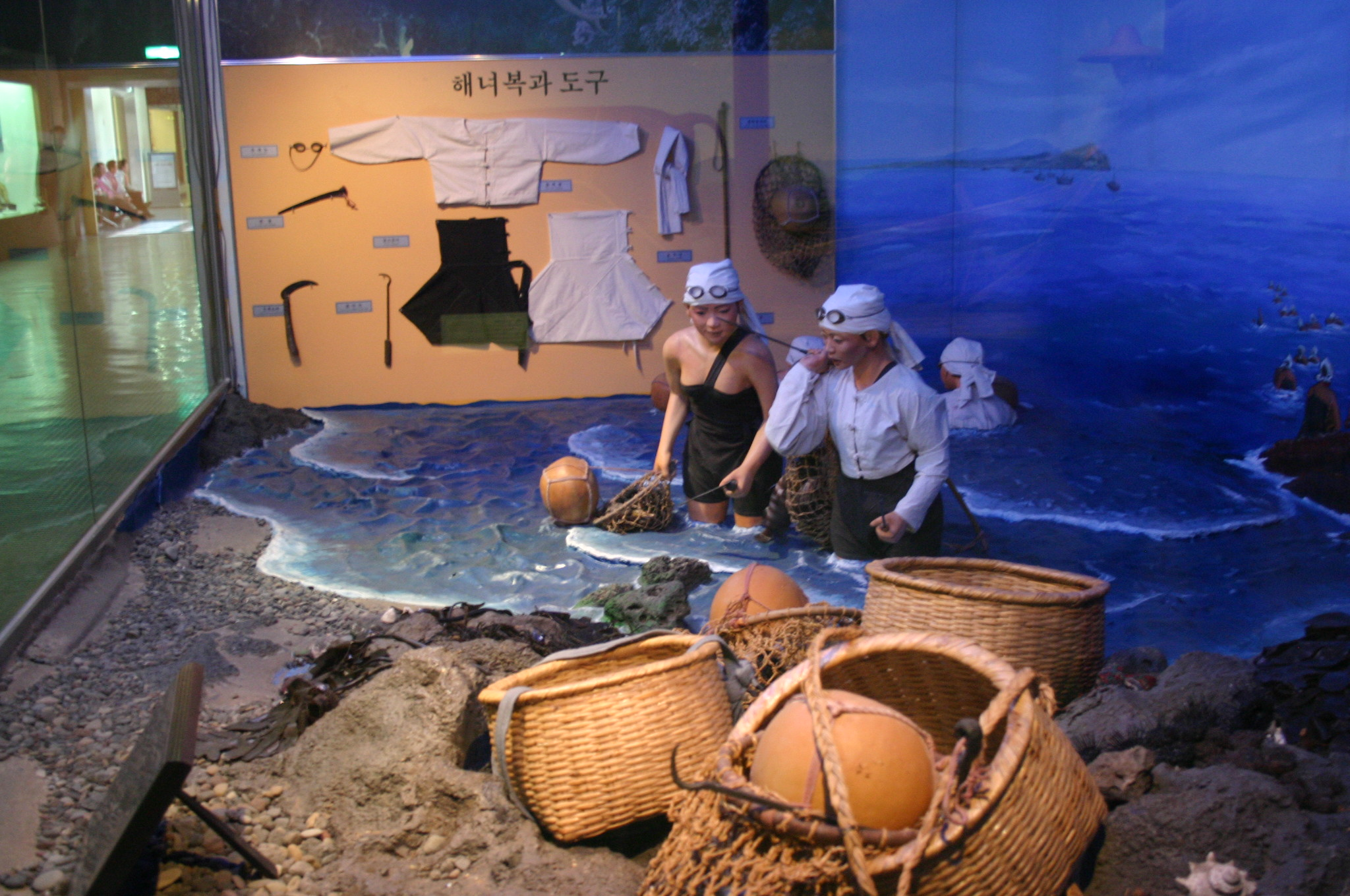
The display shows haenyeo in the past at a museum in Jeju

== In popular culture ==
- Families of the World: Korea - 1974 CBC film about a 12-year-old girl training to be a haenyeo.
- My Mother, the Mermaid – 2004 film about a mother (who used to be a haenyeo) and her daughter.
- Tamra, the Island – 2009 television series set in the 17th century, in which the heroine is a haenyeo.
- Swallow the Sun – 2009 television series in which the protagonist's mother is a haenyeo.
- Haenyeo: Women of the Sea – 2013 short film about Chewar Park, a still active 82-year-old haenyeo diver. Examining her daily routine as well as her past, Park sheds light on this unique matriarchal culture that has changed little since the 19th century.
- My Neighbor, Charles – 2015, episodes 24, 25, and 26 (documentary TV series); a Japanese immigrant trains to become a haenyeo.
- Breathing Underwater – 2016 documentary on haenyeo directed by Koh Heeyoung.
- Canola – 2016 film starring Youn Yuh-jung as an elderly sanggun haenyo (captain of the seawomen).
- Soft Sounds from Another Planet – 2017 album by Japanese Breakfast which references Jeju-do and uses haenyeo as a metaphor in the song "Diving Woman."
- Episode 1 of South Korea: Earth's Hidden Wilderness, BBC 2018, includes a feature on haenyeo free-diving for conches, and interviews one said to be aged 94.
- White Chrysanthemum – a 2018 novel by Korean-American author Mary Lynn Bracht featuring a haenyeo taken as a comfort woman by the Japanese military in World War II.
- The Island of Sea Women – a 2019 novel by American author Lisa See, is about the friendship and lives of two haenyeo during the Japanese occupation of Korea.
- Endlings - a 2018/2019 play by Celine Song, which portrays three elderly haenyeo and touches on themes of family, immigration, and theater. The play received its debut at Boston's American Repertory Theater in February 2019, with another production at the off-Broadway New York Theatre Workshop in February 2020.
- Lessons from Jeju - a 2020 Patagonia Films documentary that follows professional female freediver Kimi Werner as she seeks advice about motherhood from haenyeo during her pregnancy.
- Three Moons of Biyangdo – a 2022 documentary about three sisters (Kyung-Mi, Geum-Mi, and Jeong-Mi), who live on Biyangdo island, off Jeju's island and have been freediving together as haenyeo for the past 25 years.
- In the television adaptation of Pachinko, the lead character Kim Sunja works as a haenyeo as a young girl.
- Our Blues – 2022 Korean drama series which portrays the work atmosphere between haenyeo of different ages.
- Welcome to Samdal-ri (2023 South Korean TV series) in which the main female protagonist's mother is a haenyeo. The series includes a lot of history about the haenyeo as well as the matriarchal structure it influenced in the daily lives of their families in Jeju.
- The Last of the Sea Women, a documentary by Sue Kim about the haenyeo, that premiered at the 2024 Toronto International Film Festival, where it won the NETPAC Award.
- When Life Gives You Tangerines (2025 South Korean TV series) in which the main female protagonist's mother is a haenyeo and the importance of haenyeo is an important element of the series. The series also explores the economic struggles of women in Jeju, particularly those of haenyeo breadwinners in low-income families.
- Deep Dive Korea, (2025 BBC/JTBC TV series) which follows actor Song Ji-hyo as she trains to become a haenyeo.

== See also ==
- Ama (diving) – Japanese pearl divers
- Skandalopetra diving – Freediving using a stone weight at the end of a rope to the surface
- Culture of Korea
