= Sayuri Fujita =

Japanese entertainer (born 1979)

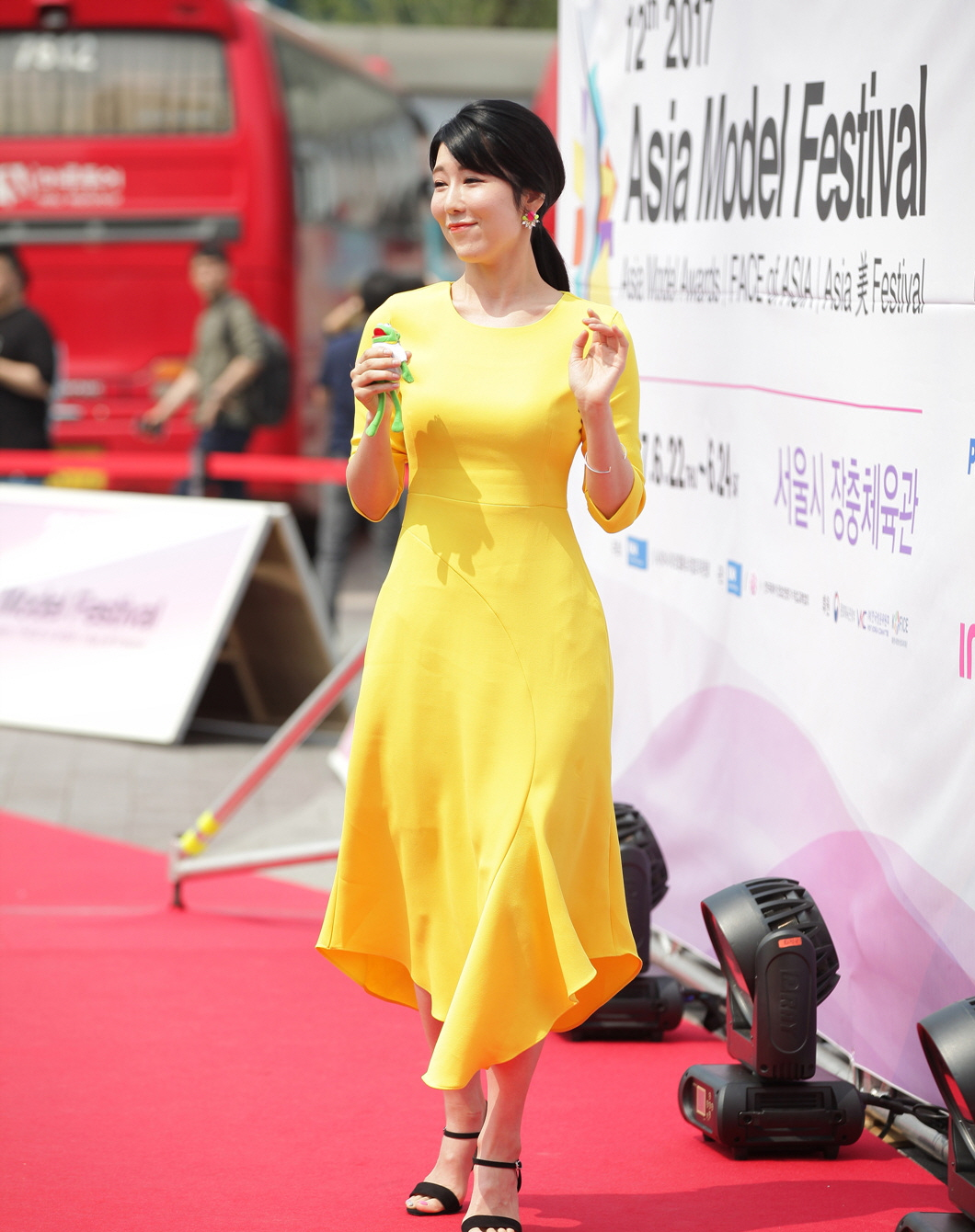
- Born: October 13, 1979 (age 47); Shibuya-ku, Tokyo, Japan
- Occupation: Television personality
- Years active: 2007–present
- Children: 1

Sayuri Fujita

Japanese name
- Kanji: 藤田 小百合
- Kana: ふじた さゆり

Korean name
- Hangul: 후지타 사유리
Transcriptions
- Revised Romanization: Hujita Sayuri

Sayuri Fujita (藤田小百合, Fujita Sayuri; born October 13, 1979) is a Japanese television personality based in South Korea. From 2007, she regularly appeared on KBS's Global Talk Show as a representative of Japan, until the show's second season ended. She had also been a regular on Wonderful Friday, including its predecessor, Live Show: Friday Wide, since 2011 until the show ended in 2014. In 2014, she joined the reality-variety TV show, With You, with singer and television personality, Lee Sang-min and remained on the show until the first season finished. She is currently a panelist on the reality-variety show, My Neighbor, Charles, and has been since 2015.

== Career ==
In 2010, Fujita was appointed as a PR Ambassador for the 2010 G20 Seoul summit.

== Filmography ==
=== Television series ===
Year	Title	Role	Notes
2007–2010	Global Talk Show	Panelist	
2011–2014	Wonderful Friday	Cast member	
2014	With You	Cast member, paired with Lee Sang-min	Season 1
2014	Go to Work from Today	Cast member	3rd class
2015	Real Men	Cast member	Season 2, Female Edition 3
2015–2017	Wild Story Quest for Humanity	Co-host	
2015–present	My Neighbor, Charles	Panelist	Episode 24–present
2016–2017	Delicious Map	Host	Season 2
2017	iKON Idol School Trip	Co-host	Episodes 1–6
2017–2018	Crazy Couple	Fixed panelist	
2018–present	Space Talk	Fixed panelist	
2021–present	The Return of Superman	Cast member	Episodes 380–present
2023	Miss Wife	Panelist	MBC Lunar New Year

== Publications ==
- 도키나와 코코로: 후지타 사유리의 도쿄 오키나와 감성 방랑기 (2008), ISBN 9788962590296
- 미수다 사유리의 일본어 리얼토크 (2009), ISBN 9788960006706
- 눈물을 닦고: 사유리의 일상과 생각을 담은 감성 에세이 (2015), ISBN 9791157522675

== Awards and nominations ==
Year	Award	Category	Nominated work	Result
2015	MBC Entertainment Awards	Best Teamwork Award	Real Men - Season 2, Female Edition 3	Won
2021	19th KBS Entertainment Awards	Top Excellence Award in Reality Category	The Return of Superman	Nominated
2021	19th KBS Entertainment Awards	Best Entertainer Award in Show/Variety Category	The Return of Superman	Won
2022	2022 KBS Entertainment Awards	Top Excellence Award in Reality Category	The Return of Superman	Won
