= Koh Heeyoung =

Korean film-maker

- Born: Jeju Island
- Occupation: Filmmaker
- Notable work: Breathing Underwater (documentary film)

Korean name
- Hangul: 고희영
- RR: Go Huiyeong
- MR: Ko Hŭiyŏng

Koh Heeyoung (Korean: 고희영) is a South Korean film-maker, who is the director of Breathing Underwater, a documentary on haenyo. Its production was part of wider efforts to raise awareness of, and UNESCO listing for the culture of haenyo. The film premiered at the Korean Cultural Centre Australia. Another early screening was also held at the London Korean Film Festival.

Born in Jeju, where the haenyo are from, Koh spent seven years collecting footage. In 2019 she was invited to the Museum of Far Eastern Antiquities in Sweden, where an exhibition on the haenyo and a showing of Breathing Underwater were held to commemorate 60 years of diplomatic ties between the two countries.

== Filmography ==
- 2016 - Breathing Underwater
