= Global Talk Show =

South Korean television program

- Also known as: Misuda; A Chat with Beauties; Chit Chat with Beautiful Ladies
- Hangul: 미녀들의 수다
- Hanja: 美女들의 수다
- RR: Minyeodeurui suda
- MR: Minyŏdŭrŭi suda
- Genre: Talk show
- Country of origin: South Korea
- Original language: Korean
- No. of seasons: 2

Production
- Production company: Korean Broadcasting System

Original release
- Network: KBS 2TV
- Release: November 26, 2006 – May 3, 2010

Global Talk Show (Korean: 미녀들의 수다), also known as Misuda (미수다), was a South Korean television program on Korean Broadcasting System (KBS). The show features a panel of foreign women residing in South Korea, usually as international students, who discussed their experiences and cultures in a talk show format in the Korean language. After high viewer ratings from its first broadcast on October 7, 2006 during the Chuseok holiday, it became a regularly broadcast program starting November 26, 2006. Its final episode was aired on Christmas 2010.

== Overview ==
The show's name has been variously translated as Chat with Beauties, Chatting Beauties, Beauties's Chatterbox, or Misuda (a shortened version of its Korean name).

The show was hosted by Nam Hui-seok, a television personality and comedian. Later on, announcer Eom Ji-in joined as co-host, and eventually Lee Yun-seok and Seo Gyeong-seok became the final hosts. The song "Bring It All Back" by S Club 7 is played after the opening cut to the studio floor that follows the playing of the opening intro and the viewer advisory that it is a rated "15" program. Unlike most talk shows, Global Talk Show does not have a live studio audience and instead uses audience laughter and applause tracks as well as on-screen text and sound effects.

In 2009 the program came under attack, receiving widespread criticism by internet users after a student panelist labeled short men (men under 180 cm) as "losers". The program suffered a decline in popularity thereafter and was later cancelled. Nevertheless, the popularity of the program gave celebrity status within South Korea to some of the panelists. A portion of the program was also published as a book featuring the same subject.

== Countries ==
=== Asia ===
- Armenia
- Azerbaijan
- China
- Georgia
- Hong Kong
- India
- Indonesia
- Israel
- Jordan
- Japan
- Kazakhstan
- Kyrgyzstan
- Malaysia
- Mongolia
- Iraq
- Nepal
- Singapore
- Thailand
- Turkey
- Taiwan
- Uzbekistan
- Vietnam

=== Africa ===
- Cameroon
- Egypt
- Ethiopia
- Gabon
- Kenya
- South Africa
- Tunisia

=== Europe ===
- Austria
- Czech Republic
- Spain
- Finland
- France
- United Kingdom
- Germany
- Italy
- Poland
- Russia
- Sweden
- Ukraine

=== Americas ===
- Brazil
- Canada
- Colombia
- Ecuador
- Mexico
- Paraguay
- United States
- Guatemala

=== Oceania ===
- Australia
- New Zealand
- Guam

== Notable alumnae ==
Many Misuda graduates have gone on to become highly active in the entertainment industry both in Korea and abroad:

- Bronwyn Mullen and Sayuri Fujita regularly appear on KBS, SBS, and MBC.
- Vickie Eisenstein and Marie-Anne Pasquet have both appeared on KBS's Go Go! Korea Travelogue
- Annabelle Ambrose hosted the radio show Drivetime on tbs eFM with Sam Hammington.
- Vera Hohleiter published a book in Germany about her experiences in Korea, which was interpreted by many South Koreans to be unduly critical of their country.

== Other versions ==
- YouTube once had a home recorded video of the "Korea Talk Show", with people from different provinces in South Korea. There were two episodes uploaded in 2009. The video was not very famous and has now been deleted by the user.
- Thailand has a Thai language version of this show on the Thai TV channel TV3 by the name of Sonthana Kham Ayu (สนทนาข้ามอายุ; "Discussion Over Age"), with its participants hailing from all over Thailand and grouped by age from 5-14, 15-24, 25-34, 35-44, 45-54 and 55+, with each age range represented by 1 to 2 people. The sign have the name and age range. The show premiered in May 2011.
