= List of My Neighbor, Charles episodes =

My Neighbor, Charles is a South Korean television series that premiered on January 6, 2015 on KBS 1TV.

== Episodes ==
=== 2015 ===
List of episodes (2015)

No.	Title	Cast	Panel	Host	Original release date
1	"Giulia / Arnaud / Adelia"	Giulia Alfonso, Arnaud Laudrin, Adelia Khamieva	Davide Di Meo, Adelaide Kamat (Adi), Romina Follinus	Alex Chu	January 6, 2015
Giulia has come from Italy for one thing - the love for her husband. As a new bride living with her in-laws, she has so much to learn. But her mother-in-law is so strict and stubborn, they constantly clash heads. Arnaud is the crepe seller from France that looks like Beckham. He's struggling to make ends meet in a market that's filled with elderly people, selling a modern snack. Adelia has just made it in a Korean company. Her first day of work starts. Having to adjust to work life but also life in a foreign country. Will she make it?
2	"Giulia / Arnaud / Adelia"	Giulia Alfonso, Arnaud Laudrin, Adelia Khamieva	Davide Di Meo, Adelaide Kamat (Adi), Romina Follinus	Alex Chu	January 13, 2015
The students have their first class following their entrance into foreigner school the previous week. They're joined by English specialist Kim Yeongcheol who teaches them about how to be more appealing in Korea.
3	"Giulia / Arnaud / Adelia"	Giulia Alfonso, Arnaud Laudrin, Adelia Khamieva	Davide Di Meo, Adelaide Kamat (Adi), Romina Follinus	Alex Chu	January 20, 2015
Giulia is continuing to struggle because of her relationship with her mother-in-law! Arnaud's also living with his mother-in-law! Cristina, the skilled daughter-in-law is here to help them all out. Take a look into living with in-laws with special teacher Cristina! What is the secret to living happily with in-laws? Find out!
4	"Giulia / Arnaud / Adelia"	Giulia Alfonso, Arnaud Laudrin, Adelia Khamieva	Davide Di Meo, Adelaide Kamat (Adi), Romina Follinus	Alex Chu	January 27, 2015
10-year Korean workforce veteran Jo Ujong is here to help out foreigners working in Korea like Adelia. When you greet a superior, you must show the top of your head. That's how low you need to bow. And you must attend company dinners whether you like it or not. So many unwritten rules and cultural difference in the workforce in Korea. Jo Ujong confronts every question that the foreigner school students have. We reveal everything you need to know to become a top new employee at a Korean firm!
5	"Giulia / Arnaud / Adelia"	Giulia Alfonso, Arnaud Laudrin, Adelia Khamieva	Davide Di Meo, Adelaide Kamat (Adi), Romina Follinus	Alex Chu	February 3, 2015
The fourth lesson at the foreigner school. Housing is the no. 1 problem faced by foreigners living in Korea. Monthly rent or one-off rent? Cho Hyeryeon is the teacher for today who will teach them about housing culture in Korea. She uses her experience of living in China and Japan to teach about renting.
6	"Shannon / Simón / Mahmoud"	Robertlandy Simón, Shannon Williams, Mahmoud Abdullaev	Davide Di Meo, Adelaide Kamat (Adi), Romina Follinus	Alex Chu	February 10, 2015
New students have come to the Foreigner School! Simon (Cuba) who's a volleyball player, Shannon (UK) who's a rookie singer, and Mahmoud ( Uzbekistan) who owns an Uzbek restaurant are the juniors of Giulia, Arnaud and Adelia who graduated in last episode. What do these new students want to learn in the Foreigner School? Let's look into them who all differ in occupation, nationality and religion.
7	"Shannon / Simón / Mahmoud"	Robertlandy Simón, Shannon Williams, Mahmoud Abdullaev	Davide Di Meo, Adelaide Kamat (Adi), Romina Follinus	Alex Chu	February 17, 2015
Shannon sings the national anthem of Korea in front of thousands of Koreans. But she has never sung it before since she was born and raised in the UK. To sing the national anthem of Korea, the pride of Korea, she practices hard for 2 weeks to have the perfect pronunciation.
Special (37)^{1}	"Arnaud"	Arnaud Laudrin	None.	Alex Chu / Choi Won-jeong	February 20, 2015
A street stall "Yec'hed Mat" is in an alley in Hwagok Market. Arnaud came to Korea from Brittany with a traditional crepe recipe and this is his second story. He goes to his hometown to get decorations for his new shop in Hongdae and learns a new crepe recipe from his uncle.
8	"Shannon / Simón / Mahmoud"	Robertlandy Simón, Shannon Williams, Mahmoud Abdullaev	Davide Di Meo, Adelaide Kamat (Adi), Romina Follinus	Alex Chu	February 24, 2015
We listen to Simon, Shannon and Mahmoud's concerns at the Foreigner School. Sam Hammington, an Australian who's been living in Korea for 13 years, is here to be their teacher for this episode.
9	"Shannon / Simón / Mahmoud"	Robertlandy Simón, Shannon Williams, Mahmoud Abdullaev	Davide Di Meo, Adelaide Kamat (Adi), Romina Follinus	Alex Chu	March 10, 2015
Shannon has to sing a song from the 1980s on a show. Mahmoud and his family take the KTX to Busan. They end up searching all day for a Muslim restaurant. Maura goes to a traditional market to make Simon a healthy dish.
10	"Sum / Carly and Ana / Zachary"	Carly Sjordal, Ana Santos, Sylla Mamadou Sum, Zachary Marble	Arnaud Laudrin, Mahmoud Abdullaev, Romina Follinus	Alex Chu	March 17, 2015
Sum is the only African working at the Noryangjin fish market. He cries from being insulted for being black. Zachary has been running a foreign food delivery company for 9 months but his lack of Korean causes problems with his deliveries.
11	"Sum / Carly and Ana / Zachary"	Carly Sjordal, Ana Santos, Sylla Mamadou Sum, Zachary Marble	Arnaud Laudrin, Mahmoud Abdullaev, Romina Follinus	Alex Chu	March 24, 2015
Sum is hospitalized due to stomach pains and his wife Flora gets a job at a restaurant. Carly and Ana try to get settled in Korea. These newbie students try to register for classes!
12	"Sum / Carly and Ana / Zachary"	Carly Sjordal, Ana Santos, Sylla Mamadou Sum, Zachary Marble	Arnaud Laudrin, Mahmoud Abdullaev, Romina Follinus	Alex Chu	March 31, 2015
Carly and Ana's first class at Korea University has a Korean test and an English test but they don't do as well as they thought they would. Zachary made another delivery error. Flora continues to make mistakes while working as a waitress.
13	"Sum / Carly and Ana / Zachary"	Carly Sjordal, Ana Santos, Sylla Mamadou Sum, Zachary Marble	Arnaud Laudrin, Mahmoud Abdullaev, Romina Follinus	Alex Chu	April 7, 2015
Sum's family is from the Ivory Coast but they live in Korea. Sum is back at the fish market and Flora is working at the restaurant. Zachary has trouble with his delivery business because of his lack of Korean speaking skills.
14	"5 Chefs from India (Bupin, Lovely, Valvir, Dinesh, Annu) / Ibailo"	Lovely, Annu, Ibailo and Gwon Hye-na	Robert Holley, Hong Seok-cheon, Romina Follinus	Alex Chu	April 14, 2015
Ibailo's mother-in-law is always frustrated that her son-in-law does everything so slowly. He also can't understand his in-law's Busan dialect. Meanwhile, the restaurant owner wants the Hindu Indian chefs to make beef dishes.
15	"5 Chefs from India (Bupin, Lovely, Valvir, Dinesh, Annu) / Ibailo"	Lovely, Annu, Lee Hyeon-ja	Robert Holley, Hong Seok-cheon, Romina Follinus	Alex Chu	April 21, 2015
Ibailo has been living with his in-laws for 3 years. Often, he seems to lack common sense. The 5 fathers who live far from their families India miss their families. They talk about Indian culture with their Korean boss.
16	"5 Chefs from India (Bupin, Lovely, Valvir, Dinesh, Annu) / Ibailo"	Ibailo, Gwon Hye-na, Park Yeong-suk, Gwon Seong-gyu	Robert Holley, Hong Seok-cheon, Romina Follinus	Alex Chu	April 28, 2015
The two new Indian chefs gradually get used to Korea. Ibailo and his wife go to a counseling center to improve his relationship with their son. Also, Ibailo and his mother-in-law clash as they prepare to have guests over.
17	"Sum"	Sum	None.	Alex Chu	May 12, 2015
Sum is the only African that works at Noryangjin Fisheries Wholesale Market! We check on his family after they were on TV. They visit their second hometown Yesan, Cheongcheongnam-do.
18	"Samuel / Emmanuel (Emma)"	Samuel Zucca, Park Hyo-jin, Emmanuel, Park Geu-rim	Robert Holley, Hong Seok-cheon, Romina Follinus	Alex Chu	May 12, 2015
Italian chef of 20 years, Samuel, and Hyojin run a gelato shop. Hyojin is scolded as she learns the work through Samuel who is thorough and precise. Emma was adopted to the U.S. from Uganda. He's married to Park Geurim. They raise a biracial baby and they worry about the discrimination and how it will affect the child.
19	"Samuel / Emmanuel (Emma)"	Samuel, Park Hyo-jin	Robert Holley, Hong Seok-cheon, Romina Follinus	Alex Chu	May 19, 2015
Emma tries to become a used car dealer. Samuel the chef that makes gelato! Samuel and Hyojin make a new family!
20	"Samuel / Emmanuel (Emma)"	Emmanuel, Park Geu-rim, Seong Gwon-je, Pyo Jin-hwan	Robert Holley, Hong Seok-cheon, Romina Follinus	Alex Chu	May 26, 2015
Hyojin's mother is worried about the uncertainty of the wedding date but Samuel has no intention of getting married. But Samuel tries by visiting Hyojin's grandma and spending time with the family. Emma is 3 weeks into his job as a used car dealer and he finally gets a chance to sell a car…
21	"Amy / Nir"	Amy, Park Yeong-bin, Nir, Song Eun-gyeong	Robert Holley, Hong Seok-cheon	Han Suk-joon	June 2, 2015
N/A.
22	"Amy / Nir"	Nir, Song Eun-gyeong, Song Jin-u, Jeong Hyeon-u	Robert Holley, Hong Seok-cheon, Abigail Alderete	Han Suk-joon	June 9, 2015
Nir works part-time jobs as a helper at a field trip and as an extra in a drama. He interviews for a metal crafting job but things don't go as planned. Amy leaves after getting frustrated by Yeongbin who relies on his parents.
23	"Amy / Nir"	Amy, Park Yeong-bin	Robert Holley, Hong Seok-cheon, Abigail Alderete	Han Suk-joon	June 16, 2015
Nir wants to find a job he's passionate about so he interviews at a metal craft company. Meanwhile, a fight between Amy and Yeongbin makes Amy leave home.
24	"Haruna / 5 French Youths"	Haruna Kosaka, Jeong Jin-gi, Raphael, Jean	Robert Holley, Sayuri Fujita, Jo Hye-ryun	Han Suk-joon	June 23, 2015
5 French youths are working hard to open a traditional French bakery. But they get poor reviews from Koreans at their tasting event. Meanwhile, Japanese housewife Haruna tries to become a diver but starts to cry after diving.
25	"Haruna / 5 French Youths"	Haruna Kosaka, Jeong Jin-gi, Lee Tae-hui	Robert Holley, Sayuri Fujita, Jo Hye-ryun	Han Suk-joon	June 30, 2015
The French youths, Raphael and Jean, are about to open up a bakery. But their container with the furnishings for the bakery is still at Incheon customs. Haruna, from Japan, wants to become a diver in Jeju-do.
26	"Haruna / 5 French Youths"	Raphael, Jean, Margery, Alex	Robert Holley, Sayuri Fujita, Fabien, Arnaud Laudrin	Han Suk-joon	July 7, 2015
The French bakery is finally open and they start to get customers. But there are mistakes with orders and payment, which puts the French youths in disarray. Meanwhile, Haruna is late for an individual dive. The senior divers are already out at sea and Haruna tears her wetsuit.
27	"Mahmoud"	Mahmoud	None.	Han Suk-joon	July 21, 2015
Mahmoud and his family are from Uzbekistan. They are Muslims living in Korea. They opened a restaurant in Itaewon, Yongsan but customers have trouble understanding their unfamiliar food and culture. As Muslims, they can't sell pork or alcohol, and they must pray 5 times a day at designated times.
28	"Shannon"	Shannon	None.	Han Suk-joon	July 28, 2015
Shannon was born to a British father and a Korean mother. She has to sing the national anthem after debuting only 50 days ago. She works hard on memorizing the difficult lyrics and fixing her Korean pronunciation to perform but people criticize her online for singing the national anthem as a foreigner.
29	"Paula / Paulina / 4 Island Teachers"	Paula Essam, Paulina, Rachel, Sangd	Robert Holley, Hong Seok-cheon, Sayuri Fujita	Han Suk-joon	August 4, 2015
The island of angels Bigeum-do. Native English teachers William and Rachel live here. Culture teachers Sangd and Anupam's story.
30	"Paula / Paulina / 4 Island Teachers"	Paula Essam, Kim Da-jeong, Paulina, Lee Eun-ji	Robert Holley, Hong Seok-cheon, Sayuri Fujita, Gongchan	Han Suk-joon	August 11, 2015
Paula works hard to memorize around 50 cheer songs and Paulina keeps getting yelled at by the team leader for messing the dance moves up. The 4 teachers on the island have differences in opinion over teaching the class in both Korean and English.
31	"Paula / Paulina / 4 Island Teachers"	William, Rachel, Sangd, Anupam	Robert Holley, Hong Seok-cheon, Sayuri Fujita, Gongchan	Han Suk-joon	August 18, 2015
Rachel and William from the U.S., Anupam from India and Sangd from Comoros teach and make memories with the kids of Bigeumdo as teachers. Ukrainian Paulina has her first big concert as the youngest member on her dance team.
32	"Greg's Family / Underwater Ballet Team"	Jenny Glenn, Alison Glenn, Sonya, Nikita	Robert Holley, Hong Seok-cheon, Sayuri Fujita	Han Suk-joon	August 25, 2015
A Ukrainian underwater ballet performance team has to perform at a Korean aquarium only 3 days after getting to Korea. They have to perform the next day but they make many mistakes during the preview performance for the employees. Meanwhile, Greg is a father of 12 children and he takes his kids to a baseball game. Troubles arise as soon as they get on the subway.
33	"Greg's Family / Underwater Ballet Team"	Greg's family	Robert Holley, Hong Seok-cheon, Sayuri Fujita	Han Suk-joon	September 1, 2015
A big family of 13 that lives in Pyeongtaek. This family always draws attention when they're out. The 5 performers from Ukraine and Belarus! Will their first underwater performance be successful?
34	"Greg's Family / Underwater Ballet Team"	Underwater Ballet Team	Robert Holley, Hong Seok-cheon, Sayuri Fujita	Han Suk-joon	September 8, 2015
The big American family of 13 takes a trip to Damyang, Jelloanam-do. They already grow tired from the beginning from packing and looking after the kids. Meanwhile, Sveta finishes her performance contract and goes back to Ukraine promising that she'll return to Korea.
35	"Ganbaatar"	Chagnaadorj Ganbaatar, Tongga, Neo-mi, Song Hyeong-jong	Robert Holley, Hong Seok-cheon, Sayuri Fujita	Han Suk-joon	September 15, 2015
Ganbaatar is from Mongolia and he's an acting major at the Korea University of Media Arts. He hopes to be an action star. He works early-morning part-time jobs to support his pregnant wife and daughter. He's a devout student and a reliable head of the family who goes to action school late at night to achieve his dream. He finally gets a chance to audition for a movie in Seoul…
36	"Yusuf and Ibrahim"	Yusuf, Ibrahim	Robert Holley, Hong Seok-cheon, Sayuri Fujita	Han Suk-joon	September 22, 2015
Brothers, Yusuf and Ibrahim, are from Turkey and they sell Turkish ice cream in the streets of Haeundae, Busan. Yusuf is good with words and can put on a show to get customers but the ice cream isn't selling now that summer is over. The brothers need to come up with a new menu item.
37	"Joe / Andrew"	Joe Pinault, Andrew Silva	TBA	TBA	October 6, 2015
38	"Nahid"	Nahid	TBA	TBA	October 13, 2015
39	"Rodrigo and Friends"	Rodrigo, Almir, Lukian	Hong Seok-cheon, Sayuri Fujita, Jo Hye-ryun	Han Suk-joon	October 20, 2015
40	"Beatrice"	TBA	TBA	TBA	November 3, 2015
41	"Greg's Family"	TBA	TBA	TBA	November 10, 2015
42	"Underwater Performance Team"	TBA	TBA	TBA	November 17, 2015
43	"Nicolas"	TBA	TBA	TBA	November 24, 2015
44	"Alan"	TBA	TBA	TBA	December 1, 2015
45	"Sien"	TBA	TBA	TBA	December 8, 2015
46	"Tabea"	TBA	TBA	TBA	December 15, 2015
47	"New Year's Eve Special"	TBA	TBA	TBA	December 29, 2015

=== 2016 ===
List of episodes (2016)

No.	Title	Cast	Panel	Host	Original release date
48	"Bob"	Robert Weimer	TBA	TBA	January 5, 2016
49	"Alex"	Alexandra Reid	TBA	TBA	January 12, 2016
50	"Shahlo / Marhaba"	TBA	TBA	TBA	January 19, 2016
51	"Ayşe / Elmas"	TBA	TBA	TBA	January 26, 2016
52	"Asumgul / Kazina"	Asumgul, Kazina	Hong Seok-cheon, Fabien, Sayuri Fujita	Choi Won-jeong	February 2, 2016
53	"Gisore / Upsara"	TBA	TBA	TBA	February 16, 2016
54	"Arnaud"	Arnaud Laudrin	None.	TBA	February 23, 2016
55	"Dildora"	Dildora Rashimova, Son Sang-hyeok, Son Da-som	Hong Seok-cheon, Sayuri Fujita, Guzal	Choi Won-jeong	March 1, 2016
Dildora left her lavish movie star life in Uzbekistan behind to move to Korea with her loving husband. She works as an unknown reporter and she still hasn't given up on her dream of becoming a movie star in Korea. She bravely helps her husband Sanghyeok fight cancer.
56	"Tanzir"	Hong Seok-cheon, Sayuri Fujita, Guzal, Chris Johnson	Maya and Tanzir	Choi Won-jeong	March 8, 2016
Tanzir was born from his Bangladeshi dad and mom (Maya). But 12-year-old Tanzir was born and raised in Korea. Bangladesh and the Islamic faith is unfamiliar to Tanzir, and Maya keeps wanting him to learn. Is Tanzir Korean or Bangladeshi?
57	"Honza"	Honza Klas, Mun Su-ho	Hong Seok-cheon, Sayuri Fujita, Chris Johnson	Choi Won-jeong	March 15, 2016
Honza is from the Czech Republic and Mun Suho is Korean. Their friendship transcends borders. Honza is very passionate about his job. He and Suho run a puppet theater.
58	"Amiata and Makisi"	Amiata, Makisi, Vivian, Josepeh	Hong Seok-cheon, Sayuri Fujita, Chris Johnson	Choi Won-jeong	March 22, 2016
Amiata and Makisi left a refugee camp in Ghana to come to Korea. Life in Korea solely consists of looking for work. Life has become harder because of 100-day-old baby Joseph and Vivian joining the family. But this bright and brave family is happy to be together.
59	"Ibailo"	Ibailo	None.	Choi Won-jeong	March 29, 2016
Ibailo is from Bulgaria and he's a tactless man living with his in-laws for 3 years. His mother-in-law is always telling him to hurry up because he's always so slow. But after a year, Ibailo's now working 4 jobs and living a really busy life.
60	"Kira and Anastasia"	Anastasia, Kira	Hong Seok-cheon, Sayuri Fujita, Fabien, Chris Johnson	Choi Won-jeong	April 5, 2016
Anastasia, a Russian single mother, came to Korea in order to treat her daughter's cancer. Little Kira dreams of becoming a ballerina, but the cancer treatment is very hard on her. Anastasia struggles to pay her daughter's hospital bills and their living expenses by herself.
61	"Jorn Couple"	Jorn Schakenraad, Kim Hyeon-suk	Hong Seok-cheon, Sayuri Fujita, Fabien, Chris Johnson	Choi Won-jeong	April 12, 2016
Dutchman Jorn met and fell in love with Hyeonsuk at a hostel in Gyeongju. Frugal Jorn is always picking up trash to be reused and this annoys Hyeonsuk. Hyeonsuk will give birth soon and she wants to get some baby products.
62	"Ko Miho Couple"	Ko Mi-ho (Komleva Zoia Andreevna), Lee Gyeong-taek, Park Suk-hui	Hong Seok-cheon, Sayuri Fujita, Fabien	Choi Won-jeong	April 19, 2016
Beautiful Russian model Ko Miho changed her name to Ko Miho after really getting into a Korean drama. She and her husband Gyeongtaek got married after only dating for 100 days. But they only just registered for their marriage. When will this couple get to have their wedding? Episode ends with an update on Anastasia and Kira (Episode 60).
63	"Lovely and 6 Indian Chefs"	Annu, Bubi, Dinesh, Sumuh, Asi, Lovely, Valvir	None.	Choi Won-jeong	April 26, 2016
How have the five Indian chefs been living over the last year? They miss their family more and more. We'll see the story about two new chefs and Dinesh's wife Sumuh and his daughter Asi visiting Korea.
64	"Sebastien Couple"	Sebastien Mellini, Lee Eun-sang, Noh Gyeong-ho	Arnaud Laudrin, Hong Seok-cheon, Sayuri Fujita, Fabien	Choi Won-jeong	May 3, 2016
N/A.
65	"Leo Couple"	Leonardo Vespa, Yoon Yong-ja	Hong Seok-cheon, Sayuri Fujita, Fabien	Choi Won-jeong	May 10, 2016
N/A.
66	"Jerome's Family"	Jerome Glory, Martha Glory, Faith Glory, Angel Glory, Love Glory	Hong Seok-cheon, Sayuri Fujita, Fabien, Eva Popiel	Choi Won-jeong	May 24, 2016
N/A.
67	"Regan Couple"	Regan Williams, Lee Yeong-mi, Lee Min-ho, Min Nam-jin	Hong Seok-cheon, Sayuri Fujita, Fabien	Choi Won-jeong	May 31, 2016
Regan learned Hong Kong wing chun and opened a wing chun studio in Korea. However, he barely gets 10 students a day. Why won't he quit wing chun despite not making much money? This story is about Regan's passion and determination.
68	"Miljenko"	Miljenko Matijevic	Hong Seok-cheon, Sayuri Fujita, Fabien	Choi Won-jeong	June 7, 2016
The legendary rocker, Miljenko Matijevic, now lives in Korea! He made his debut as the lead vocalist of the American rock band Steelheart in 1990. He's famous for his song "She's Gone" which Korean men are all aware of. He starred in a famous music show in Korea in February and caught the attention of many people! He began performing in Korea since 1996 but now he plans to actually live in Korea. Why, where and how will the legendary rocker live in Korea? Let's find out his secret!
69	"Julian and David"	Julian Favario, David, Kim Hye-sung	Hong Seok-cheon, Sayuri Fujita, Fabien	Choi Won-jeong	June 14, 2016
The sweet guys from France, Julian and David! There's a hidden store at the alley of Nonhyeon Station and it always smells sweet around that area. The owner of the store is 36-year-old patissier Julian from France! He baked bread with his mother every Sunday since young, and he began working at a bakery since he was 15 years old. Now he has 20 years of experience! He was teaching baking at Le Cordon Bleu Korea and 6 months ago, he opened his own dessert shop. But he's still not good in Korean and he can't run the shop alone. His greatest supporter is his cousin David. He's totally opposite of naughty and artistic Julian. David does the cleaning, grocery shopping and marketing that Julian needs him all the time.
70	"Mario's Family"	Mario, Kim Bo-gyeong, Mario (Jr.), Lenny, Natalia	Hong Seok-cheon, Sayuri Fujita, Fabien	Choi Won-jeong	June 21, 2016
The Mexican urbanite Mario has come to settle in Korea, his wife's native country. Mario met Bogyeong 10 years ago when she came to study abroad. After marriage, they lived luxurious lives in Mexico for 8 years while helping Mario's dad's business. However, due to social issues such as safety, gap between the rich and the poor, discrimination and so on, the couple decided to raise their children in Korea. Mario chose his life in Korea thanks to sophisticated education system and friendliness of Korean people. Will he be able to settle in Korea?
71	"Bang Daehan"	Bang Daehan (Mohammad Asaduzzman Khan), Suhekan, Bang Shanilla	Hong Seok-cheon, Sayuri Fujita, Fabien, Eva Popiel	Choi Won-jeong	June 28, 2016
The start of a new challenge, trot singer Bang Daehan! He won the grand prize in the TV show Korea Sings in 2009 for the first time as a foreigner. Since then, he got attention from the media and appeared in the movie He's on Duty and the popular TV show 2 Days & 1 Night. Actually, he was studying law in Bangladesh but due to his difficult financial situation, he gave up on going to law school and went to Korea. He lived in Korea for 20 years and 8 years ago, he was naturalized as a Korean citizen. Also, thanks to singer Park Sangchul, Daehan released his first album. Sangchul composed and wrote the lyrics for the song "Bibimbap" which resembles Daehan's life. Let's look into the life of Bang Daehan as a trot singer.
72	"Bang Saemi"	Bang Saemi (Samantha)	Hong Seok-cheon, Sayuri Fujita, Fabien	Choi Won-jeong	July 5, 2016
In 2013, Bang Huiwon and Sammy met online for the first time. Huiwon fell in love at first sight after seeing Sammy's photo and went to the U.S. They fell in love and got married after 6 months! Sammy was a nurse at ICU but she came all the way to Korea for her husband. She studied really hard for two years and got into a veterinary college to achieve her childhood dream of becoming a vet. Studying and marriage life... What's her day like with such a busy schedule?
73	"Alina"	Alina, Gu Sang-mo, Gu Tae-hun, Jeong Mi-yeong	Hong Seok-cheon, Sayuri Fujita, Fabien, Gulsanam Lutfullaeva	Choi Won-jeong	July 12, 2016
Alina came to Korea 6 years ago to achieve her dream of becoming a model. She's been modeling since her teen years but her life changed totally when she met her husband. They met as a model and a director of a modeling agency. She became a mother after two months of relationship! She has become a mother of a lovely child but she had to give up a lot of things for the past 5 years, looking after her child and the house. She's still only 25 years old, wanting to achieve her dream.
74	"Baptiste"	Baptiste	Hong Seok-cheon, Sayuri Fujita, Fabien	Choi Won-jeong	July 19, 2016
In Jecheon, Chungcheongnbuk-do, you can meet the French martial artist Baptiste! He has mastered judo, karate and he even went to Beijing to learn Wushu. He fell in love with the Asia martial arts since he was a child and continued to look for stronger martial arts to train. Now, this 35-year-old man is learning hapkido and taekkyeon in Korea. Usually, men around his age are busy earning money and looking after the family. However, this former firefighter quit his job, left France and is currently having a hard time in Jecheon, Chungcheongbuk-do. Part 1.
75	"Baptiste"	Baptiste, Ju Ung-seo	Hong Seok-cheon, Sayuri Fujita, Fabien	Choi Won-jeong	July 26, 2016
In Jecheon, Chungcheongnbuk-do, you can meet the French martial artist Baptiste! He has mastered judo, karate and he even went to Beijing to learn Wushu. He fell in love with the Asia martial arts since he was a child and continued to look for stronger martial arts to train. Now, this 35-year-old man is learning hapkido and taekkyeon in Korea. Usually, men around his age are busy earning money and looking after the family. However, this former firefighter quit his job, left France and is currently having a hard time in Jecheon, Chungcheongbuk-do. Part 2.
76	"Troy"	Troy Zizelsberger, Kim Dong-hui, Park Hye-suk, Kim Tae-u	Hong Seok-cheon, Sayuri Fujita, Fabien	Choi Won-jeong	August 2, 2016
Cicerone Troy from the U.S. is always busy with making beer. From managing his beer restaurant and newlywed life, let's look into his life in Korea!
77	"Kevin"	Kevin Lopez, Gwak Hye-ran, Liam,	Hong Seok-cheon, Sayuri Fujita, Fabien	Choi Won-jeong	August 16, 2016
Spanish man Kevin and Korean woman Hyeran met in Ireland while they were studying abroad. They settled in Ireland after the marriage, but they decided to go to Korea as Hyeran's homesick was getting worse. But it's also tough for Kevin to live in Korea. How is his life in Korea?
78	"Nahid"	Nahid	None.	Choi Won-jeong	August 23, 2016
In October 2015, Nahid's family from Afghanistan visited My Neighbor Charles. They came to Korea to escape from the war but things were still pretty hard for them in Korea as they weren't acknowledged as refugees. Nahid's parents don't have very good health condition and her mom can't go outside due to Islamic law. So Nahid had to take care of everything. It's been a year and Nahid's family is here once again!
79	"Abadi's Family"	Abadi, Amani, Amira, Midu, Fatima, Afnan, Alla, Hamad	Hong Seok-cheon, Sayuri Fujita, Fabien	Choi Won-jeong	August 30, 2016
A famous family of 6 children in Paju, Gyeonggi-do! This family with never ending laughter and joy has a hidden story. The age gap between the father and the first born is only 14! It turns out that their father Abadi is not their biological dad! Yemen, the country where war is still going on due to Denomination conflict. Because of this, women and children cannot live with freedom. They are in a situation where early participation in war and marriage is forced due to religious and financial reasons. Abadi chose to come to Korea to protect his wife and the 6 children from Yemen culture and rebel forces. The story of a father, Abadi, who struggles to protect his family and 6 children is revealed.
80	"Jenya"	Jenya (Saponov Yveschenay), Im Jeong-hui, Im Seung-yun	Hong Seok-cheon, Sayuri Fujita, Fabien	Choi Won-jeong	September 6, 2016
Jenya from Ukraine is 192cm tall and he's a dancer. He began dancing since he was 12 as his mother ran a dance academy. He's a professional dancesport dancer who even worked as a national dancer. He came to Korea in 2008 for his studies and met his wife who's 7 years older. They got married in 2013 and now they have a 4-year-old son. A great dancer and a father, how is Jenya's life in Korea?
81	"Johana"	Park Johana, Park I-ru-an, Park I-ji-an, Park Hyeok-jae, Ahn Jin-seo	Hong Seok-cheon, Sayuri Fujita, Fabien	Choi Won-jeong	September 20, 2016
Johana is a charming girl with dark skin and bright, big eyes who's from Bangladesh. She came to Korea in December, 2008. Her Korean parents had trouble with having a baby after marriage and thus they adopted Johana as their teacher who went to Bangladesh for volunteer work advised them. Johana had a hard time as she had to adjust to unfamiliar language and culture and her different appearance. And not long after her adoption, her Korean parents got pregnant with twins. She worried about her love being taken away by her sisters, but now she's a mature and thoughtful daughter who takes care of her sisters.
82	"Anthony"	Anthony, Kim Min-jeong, Deanna, Kim Ung-gil, Bae Do-hui	Hong Seok-cheon, Sayuri Fujita, Fabien	Choi Won-jeong	September 27, 2016
This week's episode features Anthony, who's from America. He fell in love with taekwondo since he was 7 and he began learning all kinds of martial arts such as jiu-jitsu, judo, wrestling. As a result, slim and thing Anthony became a bulky man whose arm is as thick as a regular man's thigh.
83	"Jose"	Jose Farinango Lema, Kang Hyeong-bin	Hong Seok-cheon, Sayuri Fujita, Fabien	Choi Won-jeong	October 4, 2016
After breaking up with his wife 8 years ago, Jose has been raising his son Hyeonbin by himself. Hyeonbin used to be always talking to his dad but now he's in adolescence. He's always playing and on the phone with his friends, and he has no problem talking to auntie. However, he just doesn't answer to his dad. What is the reason? It's because of Jose's frustrating Korean skills. Jose can't understand difficult Korean words so Hyeonbin has to explain to him repeatedly. As he got to adolescence, he became more frustrated with this. Jose has always been friendly and nice to Hyeonbin to make up for mom's absence. Thus Jose is sad to see such a change in Hyeonbin.
84	"Gregory Couple"	Gregory Deprez, Mun Yeon-jin, Roxanne Galy	Arnaud Laudrin, Hong Seok-cheon, Fabien, Olivia	Choi Won-jeong	October 11, 2016
130 years of diplomatic ties between Korea and France. The French man Gregory is even faster than Koreans! And Roxane who is studying abroad in Korea wants to enjoy a relaxing life but it is so hard. Let's meet these two very different French people.
85	"Rajesh's Family"	Rajesh Chandlo Joshi, Jeong Se-yeong, Jeong Se-ra, Seo In-suk	Hong Seok-cheon, Sayuri Fujita, Fabien	Choi Won-jeong	October 18, 2016
22 years in Nepal, 24 years in Korea! Rajesh lived in Korea more than half of his life! He gives and takes jokes fluently in Daegu dialects with grandfathers and grandmothers in the geriatric hospital. He communicates better with the seniors than the other doctors. While he was in university in Nepal, he saw one of the Korean doctors who came for volunteer work. Then he thought "I want to be a doctor so that I can help Nepal people." With just this thought, he came to study abroad in a Korean medical university! During the cold and hungry period of studying abroad, he met a lady and a man who were helping Nepal workers in Korea. And Rajesh stayed at their house for 15 years ever since. The daughter who was 10 years younger than him is now his wife! And the lady who was 12 years older than him is now his mother-in-law! For love, he became the number 1 doctor from Nepal in Korea! His story of becoming a Korean doctor from Nepal begins.
86	"Mani's Family"	Mani Dalliwal, Ham Jeong-mi, Ham Hyeon, Suki Dalliwal	Hong Seok-cheon Sayuri Fujita, Fabien	Choi Won-jeong	October 25, 2016
Mani came to work in Korea as soon as he became an adult at age 19. 2 years ago, when he was working at an Indian restaurant, he met Jeongmi and it was love at first sight. They managed to get married and settled in Korea despite 12 years of age difference. 6 months ago, Mani became the head of a happy family with a birth of his daughter. But for working parents like them, looking after a newborn is hectic! Eventually, they called for help to his mother in India and she came 3 months ago to look after their daughter. Let's meet Mani's family with their troublesome settlement in Korea.
87	"Yusra's Family"	Yusra, Aya, Joseph, Ahmed	Hong Seok-cheon, Sayuri Fujita, Alberto Mondi	Choi Won-jeong	November 1, 2016
Family of 4 living in a small semi-basement in Incheon for the last 2 years. This place, where you can hear mix of both Korean and Arabic, is the home for Joseph's family. The family was threatened after their father, the Iraqi police, helped out a Christian friend. After their father fled to Australia, the threat worsened for the rest of the family. So their mother, Yusra, tried to take her three kids to Australia. However, at the Australian airport they were denied entry. As there was nowhere to go, their mother chose what she thought to be the safest country, Korea. Sudden parting and visa problems ripped apart the family. Their father sends some money from Australia by working at a construction site. But to raise three children in Korea, it's not enough. When the money is delayed, Yusra's worry just keeps getting bigger.
88	"Brian"	Brian Don, Seong Ji-eun	Hong Seok-cheon, Sayuri Fujita, Alberto	Choi Won-jeong	November 8, 2016
It's never boring with fun-loving Brian from Canada. He and his humor and talent makes him the wife's grandmother and grandfather's favorite. Brian expresses all his talent at his own children's show! From scenario, appearance, filming, to editing, Brian does them all by himself. Infinitely optimistic Brian dreams of being a host for children's show. His life in Korea is revealed.
89	"Charles' Delicious Dining Table"	Various past guests.	None.	Choi Won-jeong, Hong Seok-cheon, Sayuri Fujita, Fabien	November 15, 2016
My Neighbor, Charles had variety of foreigners living in Korea share their worries. Out of them, there were some who tried to share their home food through restaurant business. In a country where they cannot communicate fluently, they set up their own restaurants and advertised but with great difficulties. My Neighbor, Charles' hosts went to see if their problems have been solved and how they are doing!
90	"Vica"	Vica, Min Wang-geon, Leo	Hong Seok-cheon, Sayuri Fujita, Fabien	Choi Won-jeong	November 22, 2016
5 years ago, Min Wanggeon worked as a lifeguard in Saipan. He fell in love at first sight with the beautiful Russian woman Vica, who was a dance captain at a famous hotel. He couldn't speak English at all but he kept trying hard to win her love. After three months of dating, he proposed to her and they got married in 2013. Now, they have a lovely son Leo, who's 24 months old and they have a happy life! The family's motto is "Life is happy when my wife is happy." Vica gave up on her job and fame to come to Korea. Wanggeon helps Vica with the job search and he gives her lovely presents. Vica is treated like a queen! Let's check out the couple's sweet life in Korea.
91	"Blaise and Angie"	Blaise, Angie, Samuel, Eunice, David	Hong Seok-cheon, Sayuri Fujita, Fabien	Choi Won-jeong	November 29, 2016
Blaise and Angie used to be in the national dance team of Cote d'Ivoire. By chance, the dance team was introduced in a Korean TV show and they were invited by the Artists Village in Korea. While staying in Korea, the First Ivorian Civil War broke and the two decided to stay in Korea where it was safe. Blaise and Angie got married in Korea and they've lived in Korea for 14 years with three children now.
92	"Adriana Couple"	Adriana, Lee Seong-in	Hong Seok-cheon, Sayuri Fujita, Fabien	Choi Won-jeong	December 6, 2016
6 years ago, Seongin went to Ecuador at the age of 22 to learn about and work in the coffee business. He met Adriana there, a young girl interested in Korea. They opened up a cafe with the theme of Korea using Hangul, hanbok and K-pop. The business was doing very well until a huge earthquake hit Ecuador. The windows all broke and robbers took all the expensive machines and utensils. The couple lost everything over a day and a month after the earthquake, they got on the plane to Korean. Everything is unfamiliar to Adriana, but she tries hard to get used to the new environment.
93	"Muhammad and Seonmi"	Muhammad Ibrahim, Yoon Seon-mi, Yoon Hyeon-jun, Yoon Ho-jun, Choi Kyung-sun	Hong Seok-cheon, Sayuri Fujita, Fabien	Choi Won-jeong	December 13, 2016
Seonmi who's from Korean and Muhammad who's from the Maldives worked together at a resort in the Maldives. Muhammad fell in love Seonmi at first sight. After 3 years of effort, he ended up marrying Seonmi. It's been 4 years since Muhammad came to Korea. Because the couple had to work, Muhammad's mother-in-law took care of the kids but they decided that they couldn't live away from the kids so they moved to Namwon, Jeollabuk-do to his mother-in-law's house. And that's how he started living with the in-laws! Let's check out Muhammad's family of 4 generations.
94	"Father Hajong"	Kim Hajong	Hong Seok-cheon, Sayuri Fujita, Fabien	Choi Won-jeong	December 20, 2016
Father Hajong is Italian with curly, bushy hair. It's the Christmas Special and it's the first time a priest is here at the studio! Father Vicenzo Bordo from Italy is the guest today. Wait, but he's Korean? It's his 26th year in Korea and he became a naturalized Korean last year with his new Korean name meaning Jesus' servant. He came to Korea in 1990 and he is consistently giving love to the people in need. However, he also has a painful history. He had a hard time in school because of dyslexia and that's how he came to understand people better and decide to do volunteer work for other people. Let's look into the life of Father Hajong, who is always giving love to the homeless and children.

=== 2017 ===
List of episodes (2017)

No.	Title	Cast	Panel	Host	Original release date
95	"Erica Couple"	Han Erica and Han Ji-un	Hong Seok-cheon, Fabien, Sayuri Fujita	Choi Won-jeong	January 3, 2017
Erica and Jiun got married in the Philippines and were living happily there. However, Jiun had to move back to Korea for his work. So it's only been six months that the couple came to live in Korea. Erica lived an abundant life in the Philippines, staying at a villa with a swimming pool and gym. However, her life has turned around after coming to Korea. It's because of the high cost of living in Korea. She became very stingy after coming to Korea.
96	"Dan's Family"	Dan Gauthier, Jung Min-jeong, Zachary	Hong Seok-cheon, Fabien, Sayuri Fujita	Choi Won-jeong	January 10, 2017
Dan is from Canada. He overcome the 15-year age gap and married his wife Minjeong. However, he's still uncomfortable with his father-in-law. Will they be able to become close?
97	"Aaron's Family"	Aaron Gall, Lee Bo-reum, Lucas (Ra-won), Seo-woon	Hong Seok-cheon, Fabien, Sayuri Fujita	Choi Won-jeong	January 17, 2017
Aaron is from the U.S. and he came to Korea after giving up his dream and love for music. He works as an English teacher now for his family. He always tries to be the perfect husband and dad. Let's check out the life of Aaron in Korea.
98	"Khaoula Couple"	Khaoula, Lee Sang-jin	Hong Seok-cheon, Fabien, Sayuri Fujita	Choi Won-jeong	January 24, 2017
Khaoula from Morocco married a Busan man. Khaoula's mother-in-law is very strict to her when it comes to teaching Korean culture and Khaoula's role as a daughter-in-law. Let's look into the life of a daring daughter-in-law, Khaoula, in Korea.
99	"Rich Dale"	Dale, Keanu, Denali	Hong Seok-cheon, Fabien, Sayuri Fujita	Choi Won-jeong	January 31, 2017
Two teenage boys have come to Korea, the top short track speed skating country, to get training in the hopes of making it to the 2018 Pyeongchang Winter Olympics. Their father is also in Korea, sacrificing everything for his two sons.
100	"100th Episode Special"	Various past guests	Hong Seok-cheon, Fabien, Sayuri Fujita	Choi Won-jeong	February 7, 2017
It's the 100th episode of My Neighbor, Charles! 14 teams have come to the studio to tell us the behind-the-scene stories. And videos of people who couldn't come are also ready!, South American music, dancesport and reporter contest are also prepared to add to the fun!
101	"100th Episode Special"	Various past guests	Hong Seok-cheon, Fabien, Sayuri Fujita	Choi Won-jeong	February 14, 2017
Enjoy the spelling test and highlights of last episode with 14 groups of guests! The part 2 of the 100th episode special is filled with interesting things to watch! Also meet Father Kim Hajong from episode 94!
102	"Sasha Couple"	TBA	Hong Seok-cheon, Fabien, Sayuri Fujita	Choi Won-jeong	February 21, 2017
103	"Augusto Couple"	Augusto, Jang Hee-joo	Hong Seok-cheon, Fabien, Sayuri Fujita	Choi Won-jeong	February 28, 2017
104	"Romauld's Family"	Romauld, Lee Ji-hye, Alma, Ines	Hong Seok-cheon, Fabien, Sayuri Fujita	Choi Won-jeong	March 7, 2017
The French husband who's from North Korea, Romuald. Raising his two naughty daughters, he is now against the Korean educational method which just lets the children be. Let's meet Romuald's family whose house is always hectic due to different educational methods.
105	"Adnan's Family"	Adnan, Daaemiyyah, Ilaaf, Hammoudi, Oras, Zaid, Keiteu	Hong Seok-cheon, Fabien, Sayuri Fujita	Choi Won-jeong	March 14, 2017
Conservative parents who want to continue Islamic tradition and 5 siblings who are now more used to Korean lifestyle. Everything is always hectic with this big family! Even security cameras are installed in each room. Let's check out the life of the Iraqi family in Korea.
106	"Angelina"	Angelina Danilova	Hong Seok-cheon, Fabien, Sayuri Fujita	Choi Won-jeong	March 21, 2017
Angelina was a hot issue as the "Russian elf." She's a SNS star and a model in Korea. She used to be an ordinary college girl who loved Korean culture but now she challenges herself to become an actress. Let's check out the life of Angelina in Korea.
107	"Ko Mi-ho Couple"	Ko Mi-ho, Lee Kyung-taek	None	Choi Won-jeong	March 28, 2017
The Russian beauty Go Miho is back! Former model is now a popular TV personality, appearing in many shows. Let's meet her again
108	"Hong Ha-na"	Hong Ha-na, Hong Ji-min, Hong Anur, Hong Seollae	Hong Seok-cheon, Fabien, Sayuri Fujita	Choi Won-jeong	April 4, 2017
Hong Hana is a single parent from Uzbekistan. But she looks like a Korean and talks like a Korean. Recently she began to forget and lose things and have other difficulties in her daily life. She decides to get tested at a hospital to see if she has dementia. Let's listen to the story of Hana and her two beautiful children who are always by her side.
109	"Antien's Family"	Antien, Bang Jeong-cheol	Hong Seok-cheon, Fabien, Sayuri Fujita	Choi Won-jeong	April 11, 2017
Due to unexpected pregnancy, Antien from the Netherlands came to Korea 3 months ago. Everything is new to this rookie mom. She even has conflicts with her mother-in-law as they can't communicate. Let's check out Antien's life in Korea.
110	"Franck"	Franck	Hong Seok-cheon, Fabien, Sayuri Fujita	Choi Won-jeong	April 18, 2017
Franck from the Democratic Republic of the Congo came to Korea 8 years ago as he was chosen as a scholarship student and got into Daegu University after a fierce competition. Taking care of his friends, studying, and doing activities, a day isn't enough for the doctor-to-be Franck. Check out his life in Korea.
111	"Franck"	Franck	Hong Seok-cheon, Fabien, Sayuri Fujita	Choi Won-jeong	April 25, 2017
Franck from the Democratic Republic of the Congo came to Korea 8 years ago as he was chosen as a scholarship student and got into Daegu University after a fierce competition. Taking care of his friends, studying, and doing activities, a day isn't enough for the doctor-to-be Franck. Check out his life in Korea. Part 2.
112	"Cheongjin"	Cheongjin	Hong Seok-cheon, Fabien, Sayuri Fujita	Choi Won-jeong	May 2, 2017
The Buddhist ascetic Cheongjin has decided to become a monk. She was a marketing manager in Hungary but now she's living with other monks in Korea. It's only her 2nd month in Korea. Let's look into the Buddhist life of Cheongjin.
113	"Rafael's Family"	Rafael, Yeo Jong-suk, Yeo Min-u	Hong Seok-cheon, Fabien, Sayuri Fujita	Choi Won-jeong	May 16, 2017
An innocent and childlike man from Peru! He lived in Korea for 15 years but his Korean is worse than his 8-year-old son. However, he has completely memorized the subway stations of Seoul. Let's look into the life of Rafael, who is a subway station musician
114	"Andrei's Family"	Andrei Litvinov, Kim Ju-sil, Angela, Noah, Baul, Jonathan	Hong Seok-cheon, Fabien, Sayuri Fujita	Choi Won-jeong	May 23, 2017
Andrei from Ukraine is a father of four children and a popular teacher of Saenal School in Gwangju. He's a very popular teacher at his workplace but at home, he's a terrible husband and father. Let's look into Andrei's life in Korea.
115	"Dildora's Family"	Dildora Khashimova, Son Sang-hyeok, Da-som	None	Choi Won-jeong	May 30, 2017
The Uzbek actress Dildora came to Korea because she loved it and formed a family there. Now, she is taking a break from the fancy actress life and is focusing on her role as the mother of her 9-year-old daughter Dasom. Let's look into Dildora's life in Korea.
116	"Saida's Family"	Saida, Mohammed, Paris	Hong Seok-cheon, Fabien, Sayuri Fujita	Choi Won-jeong	June 6, 2017
Saida is a very hard-working Moroccan lady! But she's having a headache thanks to these two men. Let's meet this busy Moroccan lady who's living for her husband and son
117	"Guillaume"	Guillaume Patry	Hong Seok-cheon, Fabien, Sayuri Fujita	Choi Won-jeong	June 13, 2017
Guillaume Patry is a former professional gamer who was called the warrior with blue eyes. He came to Korea as he was very much into the computer game StarCraft and he was very popular. After retiring, now he appears in many TV shows and is becoming popular again. He's an honorary ambassador of Canada as he's from Quebec, Canada. But he wasn't able to go back home for 2 years. He visits his home this time despite his busy schedule!
118	"EXP EDITION"	EXP EDITION	Hong Seok-cheon, Fabien, Sayuri Fujita	Choi Won-jeong	June 20, 2017
The very first K-pop idol with no Koreans. It's EXP EDITION! Why did they become K-pop idols when the competition is very fierce? Let's look into the lives of 4 young men who have become idols from New Yorkers.
119	"David's Family"	David, Tak Hyeon-jeong, Oscar, Edgar	Hong Seok-cheon, Fabien, Sayuri Fujita	Choi Won-jeong	June 27, 2017
David gave up on his dream and worked as an English teacher to provide for his family. Now he's trying to chase after his dream but his wife and father-in-law are strongly against it. Let's meet the Australian husband David who is in love with Korean pottery.
120	"Assan"	Abdoulaye Assan/Lee Heuk-san	Hong Seok-cheon, Fabien, Sayuri Fujita	Choi Won-jeong	July 4, 2017
Assan is a refugee boxer from Cameroon. He applied to become a refugee but was disapproved. Now he's waiting for the final call. He's living each day out of desperation to become a world champion, hoping that he could be able to continue living in Korea.
121	"Masha's Family"	Masha, Lee Ju-yeong, Lee Mi-na	Hong Seok-cheon, Fabien, Sayuri Fujita	Choi Won-jeong	July 11, 2017
Masha met her Korean husband in Uzbekistan while he was working there. However, their happy married life lasted only 5 years. Her husband passed away due to an unexpected accident, and her mother-in-law also passed away last year.
122	"Jose's Family"	Jose, Hyeon-bin	None	Choi Won-jeong	July 18, 2017
It's the Ecuadorian musician Jose again! Hyeonbin has totally changed now that he has become a middle school student! Now the father and son are so sweet to each other. Let's meet Jose and Hyeonbin!
123	"David and his wife"	David, Jeon So-ra	Hong Seok-cheon, Fabien, Sayuri Fujita	Choi Won-jeong	August 1, 2017
The Brazilian man David met Sora through an international relief organization and has been living in Korea for 10 months. He's currently running a food truck and living with his wife's parents. He wants to leave there because of his mother-in-law's nagging. Will the couple be able to move out?
124	"Medi's Family"	Medi	Hong Seok-cheon, Fabien, Sayuri Fujita	Choi Won-jeong	August 8, 2017
Medi, the son of a genius Moroccan chef, is running for his dream! Medi wants to be a great cook, even a better cook than his dad. And check out his relationship with his little sister Abela. Let's meet Medi's family.
125	"Yaser's Family"	Yaser, Lasha, Noran, Parida, Mariam	Hong Seok-cheon, Fabien, Sayuri Fujita	Choi Won-jeong	August 15, 2017
The Egyptian man Yaser is working at a factory doing manual labor in Korea but he's happy! He was an ordinary office worker in Egypt. However, in 2013, his family got in danger as he was in the opposition political party and thus his family fled to Korea. Let's check out the life of Yaser's family in Korea.
126	"Artie Couple"	Artie, Renee	Hong Seok-cheon, Andreas, Sayuri Fujita	Choi Won-jeong	August 22, 2017
A Parisian man in Sancheong, Gyeongsangnam-do? From working on the field, catching snails and participating in a dance club, Artie is village ladies' best friend! But he ends up leaving the house because of his nagging mother-in-law. Let's check out the life of Artie from France in Korea.
127	"Lydia Couple"	Lydia, Kwon Gi-hwan	Hong Seok-cheon, Andreas, Sayuri Fujita	Choi Won-jeong	August 29, 2017
The beautiful mermaid from Poland is in Jeju-do? A beautiful country, Poland, has a legend that the king defeats the dragon and rescues the mermaid. The descendant of this mermaid has come to Jeju-do where she doesn't know anyone. This Polish surfer Lydia came all the way to Jeju-do for her boyfriend Gihwan. Check out her life in Jeju-do!
128	"Timothy"	Timothy, Jeon Min-yeong	Hong Seok-cheon, Fabien, Eva	Choi Won-jeong	September 5, 2017
Timothy came to Korea, just for his wife. He's been selling homemade sausages for three years at a food truck. But because of his homemade sausages, he's seeing a great loss. Let's check out the life of Timothy from the U.S., trying to have a successful business in Korea.
Special (129)	"Love in Myanmar"	Various	None	None	October 3, 2017^{2}
The four people have gathered to head to Myanmar, the land of naivety just like the merciful smile of Buddha. They are sent to Ma Gyi Tan Village with the mission of providing fresh water to the people of Myanmar. Let's check out their journey in Myanmar!
130	"Supartin"	Supartin	None	None	November 21, 2017
Supartin is a smart and cheerful girl from Indonesia. She's fun and hardworking. She seems to be cheerful all the time but sometimes she sheds tears because she misses home and misses her mother whose sickness is worsening. Supartin tries her best to achieve her dream and earn money in Korea before she returns home for good. Will her dream come true?

=== 2018 ===
List of episodes (2018)

No.	Title	Cast	Panel	Host	Original release date
131	"The French Man Baptiste"	Baptiste	None	Choi Won-jeong	February 27, 2018^{2}
The French man Baptiste's martial arts life. From judo, karate to even wushu! He was in love with the Eastern martial arts since young. He has been learning taekkyeon and hapkido in Jecheon for 6 years. From cleaning the studio, lecture assistant, to a secretarial work as master's assistant. He is busy 24/7 and his body is aching everywhere. But to open up his own studio in France, he's doing his best and doing all kinds of difficult training to become a martial artist. He's preparing for his last challenge to become a master in Korea.
132	"The Bulgarian IT Man Chris"	Chris	Hong Seok-cheon, Fabien, Sayuri Fujita	Choi Won-jeong	March 6, 2018
The Bulgarian IT man has come to Korea to achieve the Korean Dream. Chris came to Korea with a hope of a startup. After graduating college, his friend who was involved in a startup suggested Chris enter the 2016 K-Startup Grand Challenge. He placed 4th in the contest and ended up settling in Korea.
133	"Six Siblings of the An Family"	Lee Na-yeong, An Jin-gu, An Jeong-hyun, An Jeong-min, An Ga-eun, An Yu-bi, An Gwan-u, An Jang-bi	Hong Seok-cheon, Fabien, Sayuri Fujita	Choi Won-jeong	March 13, 2018
Hello, I'm Lee Nayeong from Uzbekistan! Nayeong came to Korea in 2007. She was an inspector at a Korean company in Uzbekistan and met Jingu who went there for a business trip. Despite the 17-year age gap, they got married and now has two sons, one daughter and triplets! Nayeong is now a mother of six children. However, the family has a tragic story…
134	"Togo Family"	Yobo, Ameliebi, Blessing, Wisdom	Hong Seok-cheon, Fabien, Sayuri Fujita	Choi Won-jeong	March 20, 2018
Living in Korea after leaving his own country, Togo. After the death of the president, his son took over and is continuing dictatorship. Due to resistance movement, Yobo lost his father and younger brother. Feeling threatened, he left Togo in 2005 to settle in Korea.
135	"Jane"	Jane Wanjiru Mbagaara	Hong Seok-cheon, Fabien, Sayuri Fujita	Choi Won-jeong	March 27, 2018
Jane was a college student in Kenya. She fell in love with Korea after watching Korean dramas and decided to study abroad in Korea. She works part-time jobs all day to make a living in Korea but she still makes people around her happy with her charms. Jane wants to learn about the Korean welfare system to help the disabled like her brother in Kenya. Let's check out her positive energy.
136	"The New Bride from Ecuador, Adriana"	Adriana, Lee Seong-in, Lee Si-hu	None	Choi Won-jeong	April 10, 2018
Adriana from Ecuador is back again after a year. The couple opened up a café in Ecuador but because of the natural disaster, they faced a great loss and decided to go to Korea. At the time, Adriana wasn't good at Korean, chores and everything because it was only her 6thmonth in Korea. Also she lived with her brusque father-in-law. After the show, Adriana and her husband moved out of the father-in-law's house. To add, they got a new family member! It's their son Sihu. Adriana was having a hard time after her grandfather's death but her son brought her smile back.
137	"A Musician from the Netherlands, Arend"	Arend, Kim Hye-min	Hong Seok-cheon, Fabien, Sayuri Fujita	Choi Won-jeong	April 17, 2018
A musician from the Netherlands, Arend! It's his 3rd year in Korea. Arend plays the harpsichord, which is a representative keyboard instrument of the Renaissance. He used to perform all around Europe. But he decided to settle in Korea because of his wife who plays bassoon. They first met at a music concert and now, they are into their 2nd year of marriage. Let's meet them!
138	"Lor from France is in love with pansori"	Lor	Hong Seok-cheon, Fabien, Sayuri Fujita	Choi Won-jeong	April 24, 2018
Lor was born in Cameroon and went to France at age of 10 for her studies. She spent her childhood in Paris to be successful as her family financial state was not stable. Lor left her successful career at Korean global drink company in Paris and came to Korea. All because she fell in love with pansori.
139	"Legally Blonde pianist, Daria, from Ukraine"	Daria, Wan Ho-gyeong	Hong Seok-cheon, Fabien, Sayuri Fujita	Choi Won-jeong	May 1, 2018
140	"Too Different Mr & Mrs, Zuma from Tanzania"	Zuma and Han Jin-hui	Hong Seok-cheon, Fabien, Sayuri Fujita	Choi Won-jeong	May 8, 2018
Zuma came to Korea from Tanzania, half way around the globe. He worked in a Korean nonprofit government organization there. He was in a medical team in charge of child treatment. How is his life in Korea?
141	"Decalcomania Twins, Genya and Oleg from Russia"	Genya and Oleg	Hong Seok-cheon, Fabien, Sayuri Fujita	Choi Won-jeong	May 15, 2018
The way they walk and their tall heights. From their appearance to their souls, Genya and Oleg are copy of each other.
142	"A dream of Monk Sudamma from Sri Lanka"	Sudamma	Hong Seok-cheon, Fabien, Sayuri Fujita	Choi Won-jeong	May 22, 2018
Sudamma was born in Sri Lanka, a country where 70% of the population is Buddhist. To learn the welfare system in Korea, he came to Korea. Soon after, he ends up at Gilsangsa in Gwangju, thanks to Monk Doje who is running a multicultural center. To learn welfare system from Monk Doje, Sudamma has settled down at Gilsangsa and it's already his 8th year in Korea.
143	"We meet again, mood maker Canadian Brian!"	Brian and Seong Ji-eun	None	Choi Won-jeong	June 5, 2018
We meet Brian from Canada again! Brian's dream was to be a host of a children's show. He became a professional TV person after appearing on My Neighbor, Charles! Let's meet fun and exciting Brian again!
144	"A big family with 3 siblings, from South Africa"	Gabriel and Kim Ji-eun	Hong Seok-cheon, Fabien, Sayuri Fujita	Choi Won-jeong	June 12, 2018
Gabriel came all the way from South Africa to Korea! There, he fell in love with Jieun and got married. But a huge obstacle was waiting for them. Let's check out the life of Gabriel in Korea as a head of the family...
145	"Indian bros started a travel agency in Korea"	Tumul and Atul	Hong Seok-cheon, Fabien, Sayuri Fujita	Choi Won-jeong	June 19, 2018
Indian brothers, Tumul and Atul, fell in love with the warmth of Korea. So they started an Indian travel agency in Korea. They try hard to get more business with fluent Korean but India is not such a popular travel destination right now in Korea. So things are getting difficult. What special measure did the brothers take to overcome this situation?
146	"Amidou is from Burkina Faso, West Africa"	Amidou Diabate, Lee Yeong-su and Lu-min	Hong Seok-cheon, Fabien, Sayuri Fujita	Choi Won-jeong	June 26, 2018
Amidou is from Burkina Faso, West Africa. He's the 72nd Griot and a genius musician. He's doing well in a band but at home, is an immature husband. On the other hand, his wife is very shrewd. There is a small battle of nerves going on between them to decide who will take care of the money. What is the result?
147	"3 Cultures Under One Roof! Farah's family"	Farah Subedar, Mario Corona, Park Eun-gyeong, Aida Corona and Daniel Corona	Hong Seok-cheon, Fabien, Sayuri Fujita	Choi Won-jeong	July 3, 2018
Three different cultures in just one family! Farah's mom was born and raised in Korea. She was dispatched to Saudi Arabia as a nurse and she meets a man of destiny there. She married a Saudi Arabian man and had a beautiful daughter, Farah. Check out the life of Farah's diverse family in Korea.
148	"Ceren came all the way from Turkey for love"	Ceren and Jeong Dong-pil	Hong Seok-cheon, Fabien, Sayuri Fujita	Choi Won-jeong	July 10, 2018
Ceren and Dongpil miraculously found each other in Turkey. Dongpil even lived in Turkey to get permission to marry Ceren. Ceren is 5 months into her pregnancy and she's happy that her parents-in-law are very nice to her. But she feels pressured as the mother-in-law keeps wanting a granddaughter.
149	"Sarang, who is from Uzbekistan, "Love and War""	Kim Sarang (Mukhabbat), Kim Deok-ryeong, Kim Yeon-a, Kim Yu-jin	Hong Seok-cheon, Fabien, Sayuri Fujita	Choi Won-jeong	July 17, 2018
Sarang, who is from Uzbekistan, is the mother of two daughters. She's a very talented person! She's a traditional Uzbek dancer and interpreter who's invited to many gigs and events. Now, she has a new dream. The couple has a fight regarding living expenses. They prepare a surprise for each other.
150	"The second story of cute Mohamed!"	Mohamed	None	Choi Won-jeong	July 24, 2018
It's the family of Mohamed, who is from the Maldives. Mohamed, who was struggling to live in Korea, is back as an even more amazing person.
151	"A special family of three from Azerbaijan!"	Nihat Khalilzide, Zeynab, Zya	Hong Seok-cheon, Fabien, Sayuri Fujita	Choi Won-jeong	July 31, 2018
Nihat is from Azerbaijan. Nihat and Zeynab are sweet and lovey-dovey newlyweds. Zeynab is having a hard time from morning sickness and the brother-in-law Zya wants to play all the time. Nihat tries his best to be a good head of the family.
152	"Tam Cevzet, Turkish Haegeum Player"	Tam Cevzet	Hong Seok-cheon, Fabien, Sayuri Fujita, Christian Burgos	Choi Won-jeong	August 7, 2018
Tam Cevzet who is 25 years old is from Korea's brother country, Turkey. He plays the "haegeum!" He came to Korea to study engineering 6 years ago and ended up falling in love with the Korean traditional music! Check out Cevzet's love for the haegeum!
153	"The cooking Spanish man, Edgar!"	Edgar Quesada Pizarro, Kim Jung-hyun, Lee Sang-jo, Kim Ro-bin, Kim Leia	Hong Seok-cheon, Fabien, Sayuri Fujita	Choi Won-jeong	August 14, 2018
The cooking Spanish man, Edgar! The romantic man who came to Korea for his love is actually a pupil of Joan Roca, the famous Michelin 3-star chef. But his Korean is very poor for even to go grocery shopping. In the end, the mother-in-law, stepped up!
154	"Kim Oksana the soccer girl"	Kim Oksana, Kim Yong-hwa	Hong Seok-cheon, Sayuri Fujita, Han Hyun-min	Choi Won-jeong	September 4, 2018
Kim Oksana was born from a second-generation Koryo-saram father and Russian mother. She started playing soccer since elementary school and now she plays defense in Samrye Girls Middle School. Her new dream is to be a webtoonist! Will Oksana be able to chase after her dream?
155	"The two young men in love with taekwondo"	Edward (Bakhodir Alovkhonov), Esteban Monroe Diaz Julian	Hong Seok-cheon, Sayuri Fujita, Fabien	Choi Won-jeong	September 11, 2018
The two young men in love with taekwondo is here. Smart Edward dreams of becoming a taekwondo administrator, and fiery Steban dreams of becoming the world champion in taekwondo. To realize their dreams, they must continue to practice!
156	"Migrant worker from Vietnam, Hieu."	Hieu	Hong Seok-cheon, Sayuri Fujita, Fabien	Choi Won-jeong	September 25, 2018
Migrant worker from Vietnam, Hieu. He's been working in Korea for 8 years now. He was elected as the best employee at a company in Pyeongtaek and is working hard to support his family in Vietnam. Hieu visits his hometown again and throws a surprise proposal to his girlfriend, Dwi, whom he met 3 years ago and fell in love at first sight.
157	"The first foreign soccer player to become a Korean citizen"	Shin Euison	Hong Seok-cheon, Sayuri Fujita, Fabien	Choi Won-jeong	September 25, 2018
The first foreign soccer player to become a Korean citizen in year 2000, Shin Euison. After retirement, Euison is busily active as a goalkeeper coach for FC Anyang. As he lived in Korea for 27 years, Euison says he has no problems or difficulties. But he does have one problem, it's his Korean skill.
158	"Earl Jhon's multi-cultural family!"	Earl Jhon	Hong Seok-cheon, Sayuri Fujita, Fabien	Choi Won-jeong	September 25, 2018
TBA.
159	"Pure 100% Filipino Earl Jhon is back!"	Earl Jhon	Hong Seok-cheon, Sayuri Fujita, Fabien	Choi Won-jeong	October 25, 2018
TBA.
160	"Jeff and Sujin met like they were destined."	Jeff and Park Sujin	Hong Seok-cheon, Sayuri Fujita, Fabien	Choi Won-jeong	October 29, 2018
TBA.
161	"Disproving prejudices against Saudi Arabia!"	Saad, Rakan	Hong Seok-cheon, Sauri Fujita, Fabien	Choi Won-jeong	November 5, 2018
Saad came from Saudi Arabia to Korea in 2015, and is currently studying at a university in Seoul. Unlike tall and charming looking Saad, Rakan is short and has a hair style that reminds people of a pineapple which overwhelms the crowd. They are from the same country, in same school, and in same year! But they are 3 years apart and present completely opposite charms.
162	"The boss lady, Nazokatkhon from Uzbekistan."	Nazokatkhon	Hong Seok-cheon, Sayuri Fujita, Fabien	Choi Won-jeong	November 12, 2018
8 years ago, Nazokatkhon came to Korea from Uzbekistan. She works at a company that is unfamiliar to all of us, a company that exports special equipment vehicle. She had difficulties at first because of the jargons, which were hard for Koreans as well. But after 4 years working at the company, she knows almost everything there is to know about special equipment vehicles, and now she is called the boss lady.
163	"Kenta dreams of being a star in Korea!"	Kenta, Sanggyun	Hong Seok-cheon, Sayuri Fujita, Fabien	Choi Won-jeong	November 19, 2018
TBA.
164	TBA	Daniel, Gwon-Lee Eunjung	Hong Seok-cheon, Sayuri Fujita, Fabien	Choi Won-jeong	November 27, 2018
TBA.

^Note 1 : This special was uploaded onto KBS World's YouTube channel as episode 37. The original broadcast of episode 37 has not been uploaded.
^Note 2 :Episode broadcasts from September 12 to February 20 were not aired due to KBS' strike, and were occasionally replaced by special episodes.

=== 2019 ===
List of episodes (2019)

No.	Title	Cast	Panel	Host	Original release date

=== 2022 ===
No.	Title	Cast	Panel	Host	Original release date
330	TBA	Elahe, Ismail, Niusha and Lee Geum-ae	Sayuri Fujita, Hong Seok-cheon	Choi Won-jeong	March 22, 2022
TBA

=== 2023 ===
List of episodes (2023)

No.	Title	Cast	Panel	Host	Original release date
