= My Neighbor, Charles =

South Korean television series

- Genre: Reality television
- Created by: KBS
- Written by: Park Hee-jin; Oh Myung-seon; Park Jung-mi; Lee Sang-mi; Shin Eun-mi; Kim Ah-rim; Son Min-young; Hong Sung-hye; Kim Hee-yoon
- Directed by: Lee Hae-don; Jeon Hye-ran; Choi Yoon-young
- Presented by: Choi Won-jung
- Country of origin: South Korea
- Original language: Korean
- No. of episodes: 375 (list of episodes)

Production
- Executive producer: Kim Ja-young
- Production location: South Korea
- Camera setup: Multicamera setup
- Running time: 55 min
- Production company: KBS

Original release
- Network: KBS1
- Release: January 6, 2015 – present

My Neighbor, Charles (Korean: 이웃집 찰스) is a South Korean reality-variety show that airs on KBS 1TV every Tuesday at 19:40 (KST).

== Synopsis ==
Each episode follows the daily lives of foreigners in South Korea, filmed over the span of two weeks. Daily routines, language acquisition, and cultural differences are shown during the program.

Some episodes follow members of the Korean diaspora that have returned to South Korea, including Sakhalin Koreans and Koryo-saram.
