= List of South Korean male actors =

This is a list of South Korean male television, film, musical, theatre, and voice actors who are active in South Korea. Names are listed as stage name.

== A ==
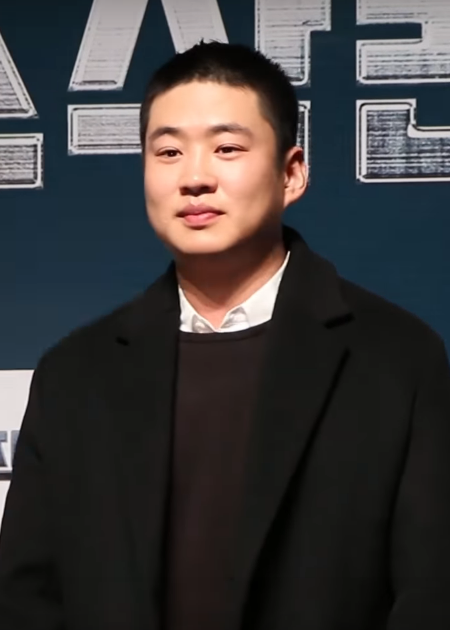
Ahn Jae-hong

- Ahn Bo-hyun
- Danny Ahn
- Ahn Do-gyu
- Ahn Dong-goo
- Ahn Gil-kang
- Ahn Hyo-seop
- Ahn Jae-hong
- Ahn Jae-hwan
- Ahn Jae-hyun
- Ahn Jae-mo
- Ahn Jae-wook
- Ahn Ji-ho
- Ahn Ji-hwan
- Ahn Nae-sang
- Ahn Se-ha
- Ahn Seung-gyun
- Ahn Suk-hwan
- Ahn Sung-ki
- Ahn Woo-yeon
- Ahn Yong-joon
- Ajoo
- An Jang-hyeok
- An Jong-deok
- Tony An
- Hirofumi Arai

== B ==
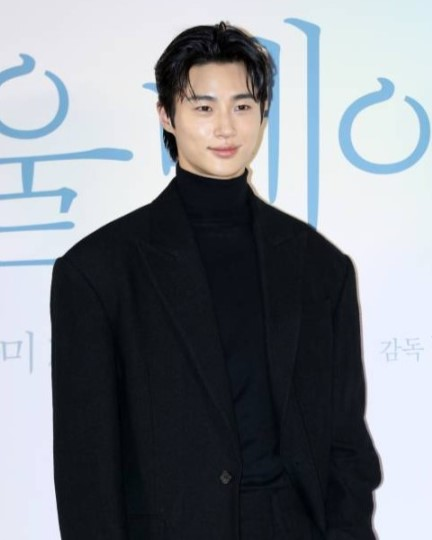
Byeon Woo-seok

- B-Bomb
- Bae Eun-sik
- Bae Hyun-sung
- Bae In-hyuk
- Bae Jin-young
- Bae Ki-sung
- Bae Seong-woo
- Bae Soo-bin
- Bae Yong-joon
- Bae Yoo-ram
- Bae Yoon-gyu
- Baek Bong-ki
- Baek Hyun-jin
- Baek Il-seob
- Baek Min-hyun
- Baek Seo-hoo
- Baek Seung-hyeon
- Baek Su-ho
- Baek Sung-chul
- Baek Sung-hyun
- Baek Yoon-sik
- Baekho
- Baekhyun
- Bak Il
- Bak Tae-ho
- Bang Jae-ho
- Bang Jae-min
- Ryan Bang
- Bang Seong-joon
- Bang Ye-dam
- Bang Yong-guk
- Baro
- BM
- Bong Jae-hyun
- Bong Man-dae
- Bong Tae-gyu
- Boom
- Byeon Woo-seok
- Byun Hee-bong
- Byun Yo-han
- Byung Hun

== C ==
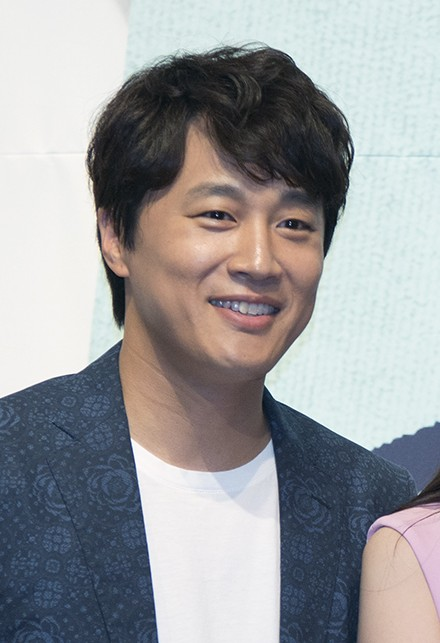
Cha Tae-hyun

- Cha Do-jin
- Cha Eun-woo
- Hugh Cha
- Cha Hun
- Cha Hyung-won
- Cha In-ha
- Cha In-pyo
- Cha Jun-hwan
- Cha Seo-won
- Cha Seung-won
- Cha Seung-woo
- Cha Tae-hyun
- Cha Woo-min
- Chae Jong-hyeop
- Chae Sang-woo
- Chang Kiha
- Chang Ryul
- Changjo
- Chanyeol
- Chen
- Cho Han-gyul
- Cho Hyun-chul
- Cho Jae-hyun
- Jasper Cho
- Cho Jin-woong
- Cho Jun-young
- Cho Jung-rae
- Cho Kyu-hyun
- Cho Sae-ho
- Cho Seung-woo
- Cho Yeon-woo
- Cho Yoon-woo
- David Choe
- Andrew Choi
- Choi Bo-min
- Choi Bool-am
- Choi Byung-chan
- Choi Byung-mo
- Choi Cheol-ho
- Choi Dae-chul
- Choi Dae-hoon
- Choi Dae-sung
- Choi Daniel
- Choi Deok-moon
- Choi Go
- Choi Gwi-hwa
- Choi Han
- Choi Hyun-suk
- Choi Hyun-wook
- Choi Il-hwa
- Choi Jae-hyeok
- Choi Jae-rim
- Choi Jae-sung
- Choi Ji-ho
- Choi Jin-ho
- Choi Jin-hyuk
- Choi Jin-young
- Choi Jong-hoon
- Choi Jong-hwan
- Choi Jong-won
- Choi Jung-won
- Choi Jung-woo
- Choi Jung-woo
- Choi Kwon
- Choi Kwon-soo
- Choi Kyu-jin
- Choi Kyung-hoon
- Choi Min-chul
- Choi Min-ho
- Choi Min-hwan
- Choi Min-sik
- Choi Min-soo
- Choi Min-yeong
- Choi Min-yong
- Choi Moo-ryong
- Choi Moo-sung
- Choi Phillip
- Choi Ro-woon
- Choi Sang
- Choi Seung-hoon
- Choi Si-won
- Choi Soo-jong
- Choi Sung-jae
- Choi Sung-kook
- Choi Sung-min
- Choi Sung-won
- Choi Tae-hwan
- Choi Tae-joon
- Choi Won-hong
- Choi Won-hyeong
- Choi Won-myeong
- Choi Won-young
- Choi Woo-hyuk
- Choi Woo-shik
- Choi Woo-sung
- Choi Woong
- Choi Young-jae
- Choi Young-joon
- Justin Chon
- Elton Chong
- Jun Chong
- Choo Young-woo
- Alex Chu
- Chu Song-woong
- Chun Bo-geun
- Chun Ho-jin
- Chun Jung-myung
- Chun Myung-hoon
- David Chung
- CNU

== D ==
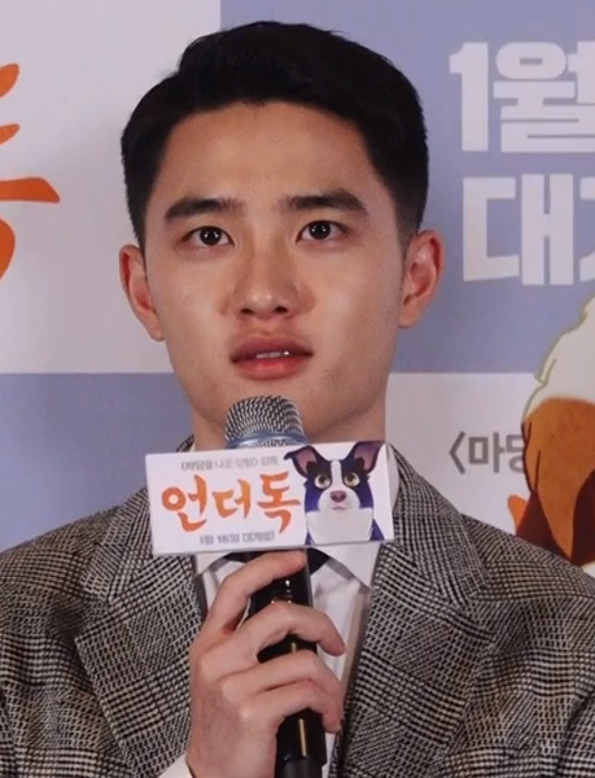
D.O.

- D.O.
- Daesung
- Defconn
- Demian
- Dex
- DinDin
- Do Ji-han
- Do Sang-woo
- Do Woo
- Dokgo Young-jae
- Don Spike
- Dong Ha
- Dongpyo
- Doyoung
- Sean Richard Dulake

== E ==
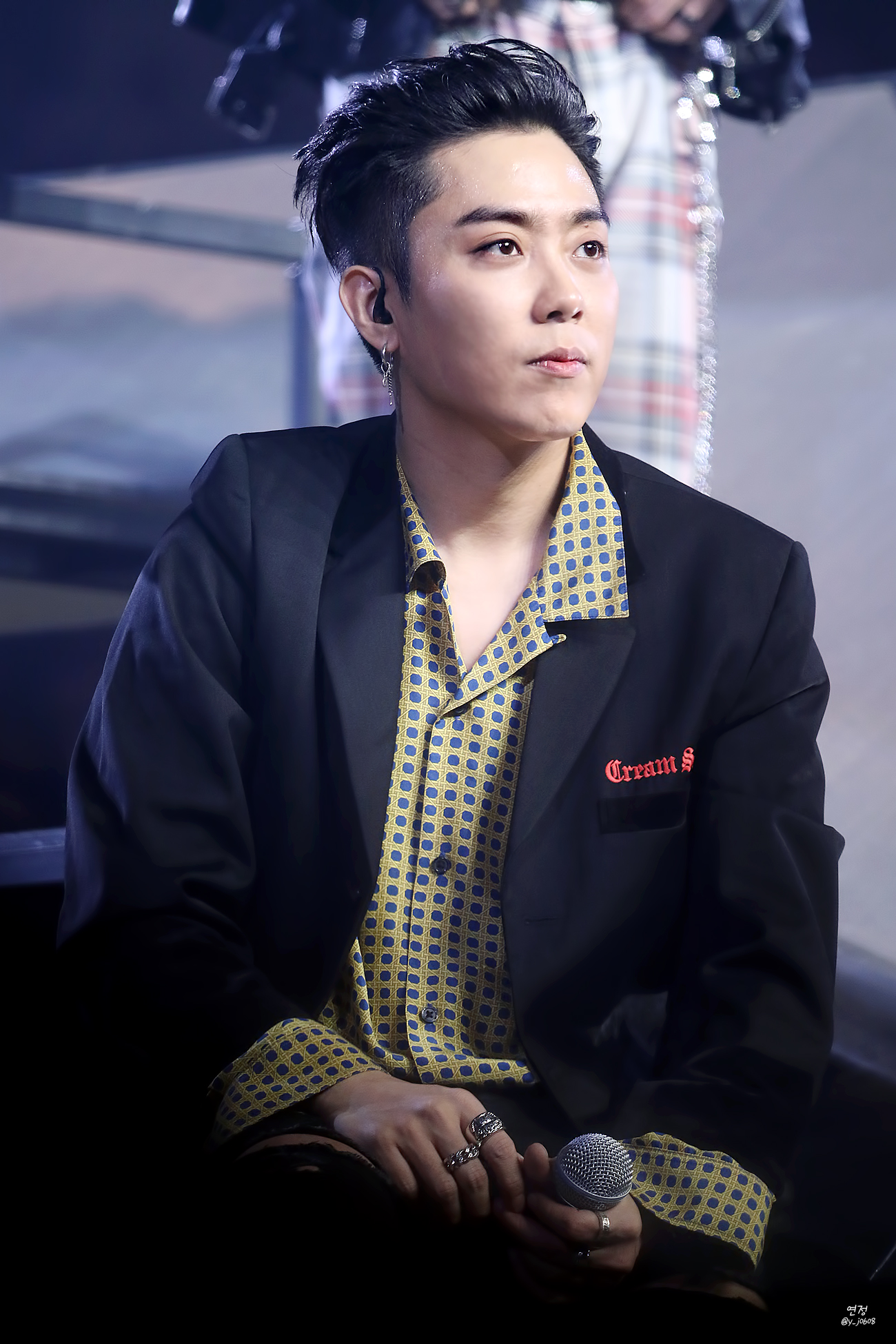
Eun Ji-won

- Eagle Han-ying
- Eru
- Eum Moon-suk
- Eun Ji-won
- Eun Won-jae
- Eunhyuk

== G ==
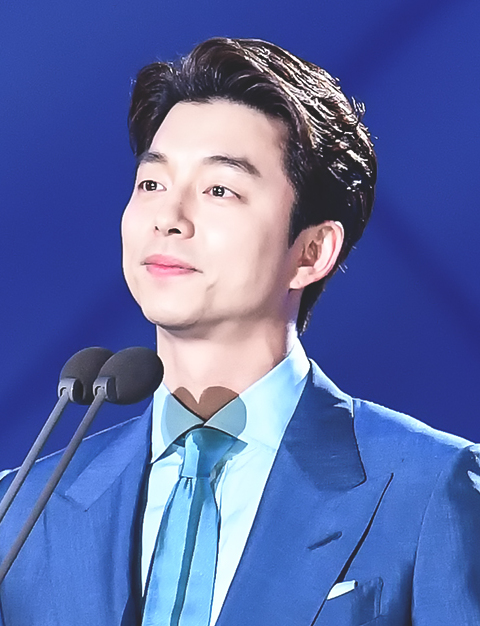
Gong Yoo

- G.O
- Gang Dong-won
- Gi Ju-bong
- Giriboy
- Go Geon-han
- Go Joo-won
- Go On
- Go Se-won
- Go Soo
- Go Yoon
- Gong Hyung-jin
- Gong Myung
- Gong Yoo
- Gongchan
- Gree
- Gu Bon-seung
- Gu Won

== H ==
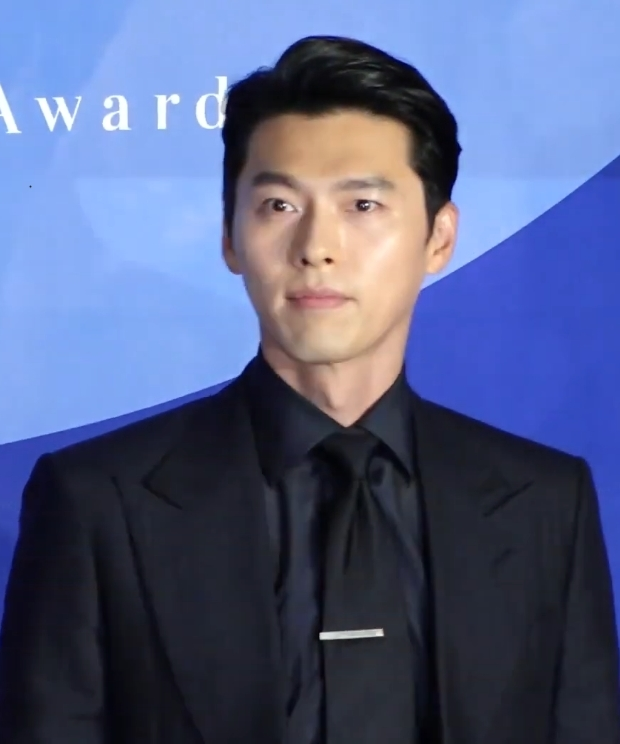
Hyun Bin

- Ha Do-kwon
- Ha Hyun-sang
- Ha Jun
- Ha Jung-woo
- Ha Seok-jin
- Ha Sung-woon
- Hah Myung-joong
- Haha
- Hakuryu
- Ham Sung-min
- Han Gi-chan
- Han Hee-jun
- Han Hyun-min
- Han Jae-suk
- Han Ji-sang
- Han Jin-hee
- Han Joo-wan
- Han Joon-woo
- Han Jung-soo
- Han Ki-woong
- Han Kyoo-hee
- Han Min
- Han Sang-hyeok
- Han Sang-jin
- Han Seung-woo
- Han Suk-kyu
- Daniel Henney
- Heo Jang-kang
- Heo Jung-min
- Heo Nam-jun
- Heo Sung-tae
- Heo Young-saeng
- Hong Jong-hyun
- Hong Kwang-ho
- Hong Kyung
- Hong Kyung-min
- Hong Min-gi
- Hong Seok-cheon
- Hong Seok-jae
- Hong Yo-seob
- Hongseok
- Hoya
- Huh Joon-ho
- Hui
- Hur Hyun-jun
- Hwang Chan-sung
- Hwang Hee
- Hwang In-youp
- Hwang Jang-lee
- Hwang Jung-min
- Hwang Kwang-hee
- Hwang Min-hyun
- Hwanhee
- Hwiyoung
- Hyuk
- Hyun Bin
- Hyun Bong-sik
- Hyun Woo
- Hyun Woo-sung
- Hyungwon

== I ==
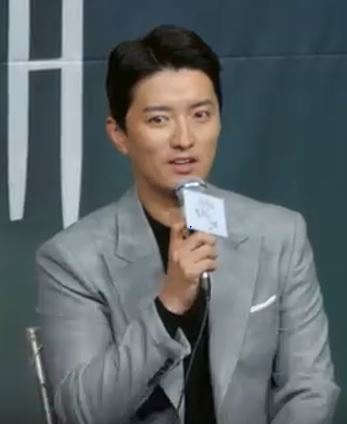
In Gyo-jin

- Im Chae-moo
- Im Chang-jung
- Im Chul-soo
- Im Dong-jin
- Im Ha-ryong
- Im Ho
- Im Hyuk
- Im Hyun-sik
- Im Hyung-joon
- Im Jae-hyuk
- Im Ji-kyu
- Im Kang-sung
- Im Seong-jae
- Im Tae-kyung
- Im Won-hee
- In Gyo-jin

== J ==
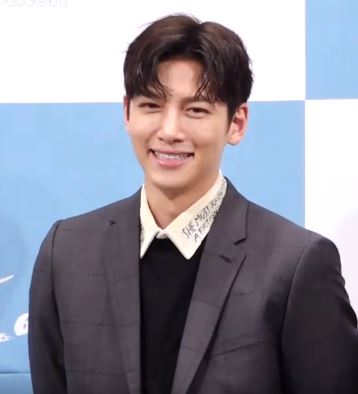
Ji Chang-wook

- Jae Hee
- Jaehyun
- Jaemin
- Jang Do-yoon
- Jang Dong-gun
- Jang Dong-joo
- Jang Dong-min
- Jang Dong-woo
- Jang Dong-yoon
- Jang Eui-soo
- Jang Gwang
- Jang Han-byul
- Jang Hang-jun
- Jang Hang-sun
- Jang Hyuk
- Jang Hyuk-jin
- Jang Hyun-sung
- Jang In-sub
- Jang Jin
- Jang Joon-hwan
- Jang Keun-suk
- Jang Ki-bum
- Jang Ki-yong
- Jang Mi-kwan
- Jang Min-hyeok
- Jang Seung-jo
- Jang Se-hyuk
- Jang Seong-beom
- Jang Su-won
- Jang Tae-sung
- Jang Woo-hyuk
- Jang Wooyoung
- Jang Yong
- Jang Yoo-sang
- Jay
- Jay B
- Jeno
- Jeon Bae-soo
- Jeon Ji-hoo
- Jeon Jin-seo
- Jeon Jun-hyeok
- Jeon Moo-song
- Jeon No-min
- Jeon Seok-ho
- Jeon Sung-woo
- Jeong Bo-seok
- Jeong Jae-heon
- Jeong Jin-hwan
- Jeong Jin-woon
- Jeong Jun-ha
- Jeong Se-woon
- Jeong Soon-won
- Jeong Yeong-wung
- Ji Chang-wook
- Ji Eun-sung
- Ji Hyun-woo
- Ji Il-joo
- Ji Jin-hee
- Ji Min-hyuk
- Ji Sang-ryeol
- Ji Seung-hyun
- Ji Soo
- Ji Sung
- Ji Yoon-ho
- Jihoon
- Jin Goo
- Jin Ha
- Jin Ho-eun
- Jin Ju-hyung
- Jin Seon-kyu
- Jin Tae-hyun
- Jin Yi-han
- Jinho
- Jinjin
- Jinu
- Jinyoung
- Jisung
- JK Kim Dong-wook
- Jo Bok-rae
- Jo Byeong-kyu
- Jo Dong-hyuk
- Jo Han-chul
- Jo Han-sun
- Jo Hee-bong
- Jo Hyun-jae
- Jo Hyun-sik
- Jo Jae-yoon
- Jo Jung-chi
- Jo Jung-suk
- Jo Kwan-woo
- Jo Kwang-min
- Jo Kwon
- Jo Min-ki
- Jo Sung-ha
- Jo Sung-mo
- Jo Woo-jin
- Jo Ye-sin
- Jo Young-min
- Jongho
- Jonghyeong
- Brian Joo
- Joo Hyun
- Joo Jin-mo
- Joo Jin-mo
- Joo Jong-hyuk
- Joo Jong-hyuk
- Joo Sang-wook
- Joo Won
- Joo Woo-jae
- Joohoney
- Lanny Joon
- Ju Ji-hoon
- Jun Hyun-moo
- Jun Jin
- Jun Kwang-ryul
- Jun Tae-soo
- Jun. K
- Jun.Q
- Jung Chan
- Jung Chan-woo
- Jung Chan-woo
- Jung Dae-hyun
- Jung Dong-ha
- Jung Dong-hwan
- Jung Doo-hong
- Jung Eui-chul
- Jung Eui-jae
- Jung Eun-pyo
- Jung Eun-woo
- Jung Ga-ram
- Jung Gun-joo
- Jung Gyu-woon
- Jung Hae-in
- Jung Hae-kyun
- Jung Han-yong
- Jung Hee-tae
- Jung Ho-keun
- Jung Hyeon-jun
- Jung Hyung-don
- Jung Il-hoon
- Jung Il-woo
- Jung In-gi
- Jung Jae-kwang
- Jung Jae-young
- Jung Jin-young
- Jung Jin-young
- Jung Joon
- Jung Joon-ho
- Jung Joon-won
- Jung Joon-won
- Jung Joon-young
- Jung Kyung-ho
- Jung Kyung-ho
- Jung Man-sik
- Jung Min-joon
- Jung Moon-sung
- Jung Sang-hoon
- Jung Suk-won
- Jung Sung-hwa
- Jung Sung-il
- Jung Sung-il
- Jung Tae-woo
- Jung Woo
- Jung Woo-sung
- Jung Woong-in
- Jung Yong-hwa
- Jung Yoon-hak
- Jung Yoon-seok
- Juno

== K ==
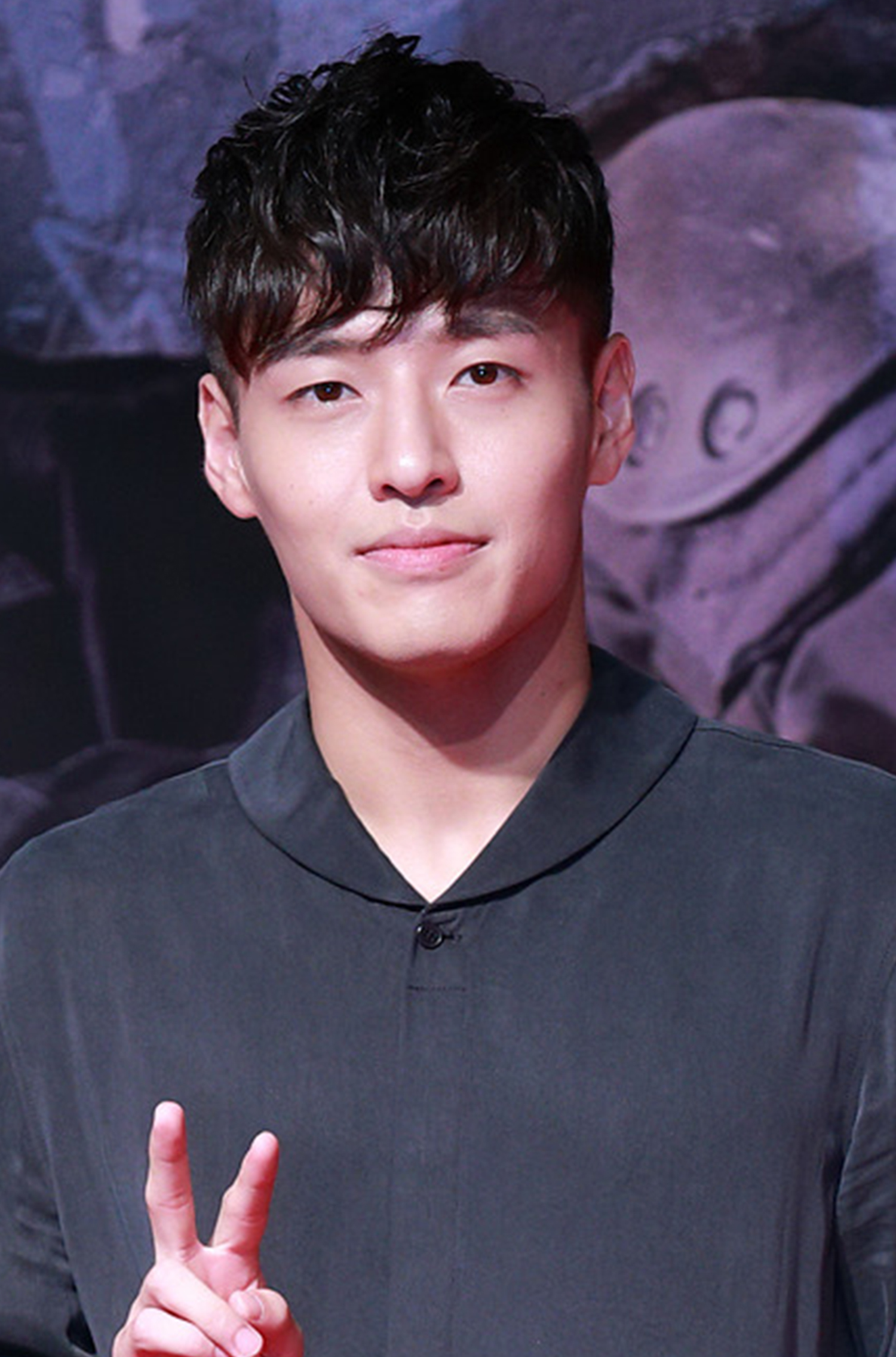
Kang Ha-neul

- K.Will
- Kai
- Kai
- Kam Woo-sung
- Kang Chan-hee
- Kang Da-bin
- Kang Daniel
- Kang Doo
- Kang Eui-sik
- Kang Eun-tak
- Kang Ha-neul
- Kang Han-byeol
- Kang Hong-seok
- Kang Hoon
- Kang Hui
- Kang Hyung-suk
- Kang In-soo
- Kang Ji-hwan
- Kang Ji-sub
- Julien Kang
- Kang Ki-doong
- Kang Ki-young
- Kang Kyung-joon
- Kang Min-hyuk
- Kang Nam-gil
- Kang Sang-jun
- Kang Seok-woo
- Kang Seung-yoon
- Kang Shin-hyo
- Kang Shin-il
- Kang Soo-jin
- Kang Suk-jung
- Kang Sung-hoon
- Kang Sung-jin
- Kang Tae-joo
- Kang Tae-oh
- Kang Yi-seok
- Kang You-seok
- Kang Young-seok
- Kang Yu-chan
- Kangin
- Kangnam
- Kangta
- Ken
- Key
- Ki Do-hoon
- Ki Hyun-woo
- Ki Tae-young
- Kil Yong-woo
- Kim Ah-yeong
- Allen Kim
- Kim Bo-sung
- Kim Bum
- Kim Byeong-ok
- Kim Byung-chul
- Kim Byung-ki
- Kim Byung-man
- Kim Byung-se
- Kim C
- Kim Chang-wan
- Kim Da-hyun
- Kim Dae-gon
- Kim Dae-jin
- Kim Dae-myung
- Daniel Dae Kim
- Kim Do-hoon
- Kim Do-wan
- Kim Dong-beom
- Kim Dong-han
- Kim Dong-hee
- Kim Dong-ho
- Kim Dong-hwi
- Kim Dong-hyun
- Kim Dong-hyun
- Kim Dong-jun
- Kim Dong-wan
- Kim Dong-wook
- Kim Dong-young
- Eli Kim
- Kim Eui-sung
- Kim Eung-soo
- Kim Geon-won
- Kim Gook-jin
- Kim Gu-ra
- Kim Gun-woo
- Kim Hak-sun
- Kim Han-min
- Kim Hee-chan
- Kim Hee-chul
- Kim Hee-ra
- Kim Hee-won
- Kim Heung-gook
- Kim Heung-soo
- Kim Ho-jin
- Kim Ho-seong
- Kim Ho-young
- Kim Hye-seong
- Kim Hyun-jin
- Kim Hyun-joon
- Kim Hyun-joong
- Kim Hyun-mok
- Kim Hyung-jun
- Kim Ian
- Kim Il-woo
- Kim Il-woo
- Kim In-kwon
- Kim Jae-duck
- Kim Jae-hyun
- Kim Jae-joong
- Kim Jae-won
- Kim Jae-wook
- Kim Jae-yong
- Kim Jae-young
- Kim Jaewon
- Kim Jeong-hoon
- Kim Ji-hoon
- Kim Ji-hoon
- Kim Ji-hoon
- Kim Ji-seok
- Kim Ji-soo
- Kim Ji-woong
- Kim Jin-kyu
- Kim Jin-seong
- Kim Jin-tae
- Kim Jin-woo
- Kim Jin-woo
- Kim Jong-hyeon
- Kim Jong-kook
- Kim Jong-min
- Kim Jong-seo
- Kim Jong-soo
- Kim Joo-hun
- Kim Joo-hyuk
- Kim Joon
- Kim Joon
- Julian Jootaek Kim
- Kim Jun-han
- Kim Jun-ho
- Kim Jun-hyun
- Jun-seong Kim
- Kim Jung-heon
- Kim Jung-hyun
- Kim Jung-hyun
- Kim Jung-min
- Kim Jung-mo
- Kim Jung-tae
- Kim Junsu
- Kim Kang-hoon
- Kim Kang-min
- Kim Kang-min
- Kim Kang-woo
- Kim Kap-soo
- Kim Ki-bang
- Kim Ki-bum
- Kim Ki-duk
- Kim Ki-hae
- Kim Ki-hyeon
- Kim Kiri
- Kim Kwang-kyu
- Kim Kwon
- Kim Kyu-chul
- Kim Kyu-jong
- Kim Kyung-nam
- Kim Min-chul
- Kim Min-gi
- Kim Min-gue
- Kim Min-gwi
- Kim Min-jae
- Kim Min-jae
- Kim Min-jong
- Kim Min-jun
- Kim Min-kyo
- Kim Min-kyu
- Kim Min-seok
- Kim Mu-jun
- Kim Mu-saeng
- Kim Mu-yeol
- Kim Myung-gon
- Kim Myung-min
- Kim Nam-gil
- Kim Nam-hee
- Kim Nam-jin
- Kim Rae-won
- Ricky Kim
- Kim Roi-ha
- Kim Ryeo-wook
- Kim San-ho
- Kim Sang-ho
- Kim Sang-jin
- Kim Sang-joong
- Kim Sang-kyung
- Kim Se-yong
- Kim Seok
- Kim Seok-hun
- Kim Seon-ho
- Kim Seung-ho
- Kim Seung-jun
- Kim Seung-soo
- Kim Seung-woo
- Kim Si-hoo
- Kim So-hyeong
- Kim Soo-hyun
- Kim Soo-ro
- Kim Su-gyeom
- Kim Su-hyeon
- Kim Suk-hoon
- Kim Sun-bin
- Kim Sun-woong
- Kim Sung-bum
- Kim Sung-cheol
- Kim Sung-joo
- Kim Sung-kyu
- Kim Sung-kyu
- Kim Sung-kyun
- Kim Sung-min
- Kim Sung-oh
- Kim Sung-soo
- Kim Tae-gyun
- Kim Tae-hoon
- Kim Tae-hwan
- Kim Tae-jung
- Kim Tae-woo
- Kim Tae-woo
- Kim Tai-chung
- Kim Won-hae
- Kim Won-jun
- Kim Woo-bin
- Kim Woo-seok
- Kim Woo-seok
- Kim Woo-sung
- Kim Woojin
- Kim Ye-jun
- Kim Yeon-woo
- Kim Yeong-cheol
- Kim Yo-han
- Kim Yong-gun
- Kim Yong-hee
- Kim Yong-joon
- Kim Yong-man
- Kim Yool-ho
- Kim Yoon-seok
- Kim Yoon-woo
- Kim Young-chul
- Kim Young-dae
- Kim Young-ho
- Kim Young-jae
- Kim Young-jae
- Kim Young-hoon
- Kim Young-kwang
- Kim Young-min
- Kim Young-sik
- Kim Youngbin
- Kim Youngsun
- Kim Yu-seok
- Ko Chang-seok
- Ko Ji-yong
- Ko Jun
- Ko Kyu-pil
- Ko Kyung-pyo
- Koo Ja-sung
- Koo Jun-hoe
- Koo Jun-yup
- Koo Kyo-hwan
- Kwak Do-won
- Kwak Dong-yeon
- Kwak Hee-sung
- Kwak Jung-wook
- Kwak Si-yang
- Kwon Hae-hyo
- Kwon Hwa-woon
- Kwon Hyeok-soo
- Kwon Hyuk
- Kwon Hyuk-soo
- Kwon Hyun-bin
- Kwon Hyun-sang
- Kwon Oh-joong
- Kwon Sang-woo
- Kwon Soo-hyun
- Kwon Yul
- Kyoungyoon

== L ==
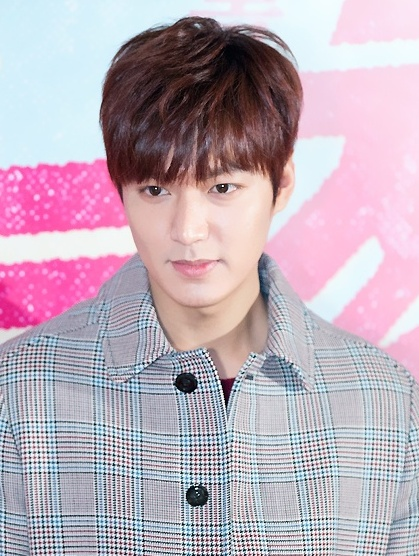
Lee Min-ho

- L
- Bruce Lai
- Alexander Lee
- Andy Lee
- Lee Beom-soo
- Lee Byung-hun
- Lee Byung-joon
- Lee Chae-min
- Lee Chan-hyeong
- Lee Chang-hoon
- Lee Chang-min
- Lee Chang-sub
- Lee Chang-wook
- Lee Charm
- Lee Chun-hee
- Lee Dae-hwi
- Lee Dae-yeon
- Lee David
- David Lee McInnis
- Lee Dawon
- Lee Deok-hwa
- Lee Do-gyeom
- Lee Do-hyun
- Lee Do-yeop
- Lee Don-ku
- Lee Dong-gun
- Lee Dong-hwi
- Lee Dong-wook
- Lee Donghae
- Dragon Lee
- Lee Eon
- Lee Eugene
- Lee Eun-hyung
- Lee Eun-sang
- Lee Ga-sub
- Lee Geung-young
- Lee Gi-kwang
- Lee Gun-woo
- Lee Ha-yool
- Lee Hae-young
- Lee Hak-joo
- Lee Han-wi
- Lee Hee-joon
- Lee Ho-jae
- Lee Hong-bin
- Lee Hong-gi
- Lee Hong-nae
- Lee Hoon
- Lee Hwi-jae
- Lee Hwi-jong
- Lee Hyo-jung
- Lee Hyun
- Lee Hyun-jae
- Lee Hyun-jin
- Lee Hyun-seung
- Lee Hyun-woo
- Lee Hyun-woo
- Lee Hyun-wook
- Lee Hyung-chul
- Lee Hyung-suk
- Lee In
- Lee In-sung
- Lee Jae-hwang
- Lee Jae-jin
- Lee Jae-joon
- Lee Jae-ryong
- Lee Jae-woo
- Lee Jae-won
- Lee Jae-wook
- Lee Jae-yong
- Lee Jae-yoon
- Lee Jae-yoon
- Lee Jai-jin
- Lee Jang-woo
- Lee Je-hoon
- Lee Ji-hoon
- Lee Ji-hoon
- Lee Jin-hyuk
- Lee Jin-kwon
- Lee Jin-woo
- Lee Jin-woo
- Lee Jin-wook
- Lee Jong-hwa
- Lee Jong-hyuk
- Lee Jong-hyun
- Lee Jong-hyun
- Lee Jong-soo
- Lee Jong-suk
- Lee Jong-won
- Lee Jong-won
- Lee Joo-ahn
- Lee Joo-seung
- Lee Joo-won
- Lee Joon
- Lee Joon-gi
- Lee Joon-hyuk
- Lee Joon-woo
- Lee Joong-ok
- Joseph Lee
- Joshua Hyunho Lee
- Lee Ju-il
- Lee Juck
- Lee Jun-ho
- Lee Jun-hyeok
- Lee Jun-young
- Lee Jung
- Lee Jung-gil
- Lee Jung-ha
- Lee Jung-hyuk
- Lee Jung-jae
- Lee Jung-jin
- Lee Jung-shik
- Lee Jung-shin
- Lee Kang-min
- Ki Hong Lee
- Lee Ki-chan
- Lee Ki-hyuk
- Lee Ki-seop
- Lee Ki-taek
- Lee Ki-woo
- Lee Ki-young
- Lee Kwang-soo
- Lee Kye-in
- Lee Kyu-han
- Lee Kyu-hyung
- Lee Kyu-sung
- Lee Kyung-kyu
- Michael K. Lee
- Lee Min-ho
- Lee Min-hyuk
- Lee Min-jae
- Lee Min-ki
- Lee Min-woo
- Lee Min-woo
- Lee Moo-saeng
- Lee Moon-sik
- Lee Myung-hoon
- Lee Nak-hoon
- Lee Phillip
- Lee Pil-mo
- Lee Sae-on
- Sang Heon Lee
- Lee Sang-jun
- Lee Sang-min
- Lee Sang-woo
- Lee Sang-woo
- Lee Sang-yeob
- Lee Sang-yi
- Lee Sang-yoon
- Lee Seo-hwan
- Lee Seo-jin
- Lee Seo-won
- Lee Seon-ho
- Lee Seong-jong
- Lee Seung-chul
- Lee Seung-gi
- Lee Seung-ho
- Lee Seung-hoon
- Lee Seung-hyo
- Lee Seung-hyub
- Lee Seung-hyung
- Lee Seung-il
- Lee Seung-joon
- Lee Seung-joon
- Lee Seung-ryong
- Lee Seung-wook
- Lee Shin-young
- Lee Si-eon
- Lee Si-hoo
- Lee Si-woo
- Lee Soo-geun
- Lee Soo-hyuk
- Lee Soon-jae
- Lee Soon-won
- Lee Suk-hyeong
- Lee Sun-kyun
- Lee Sung-jae
- Lee Sung-min
- Lee Sung-min
- Lee Sung-wook
- Lee Sung-yeol
- Lee Tae-gon
- Lee Tae-hwan
- Lee Tae-ri
- Lee Tae-sun
- Lee Tae-sung
- Lee Tae-vin
- Lee Wan
- Lee Won-jong
- Lee Won-jung
- Lee Won-keun
- Lee Yeong-hoon
- Lee Yi-kyung
- Lee Yong-woo
- Lee You-cheong
- Lee You-jin
- Lee Young-ha
- Leeteuk
- Leo
- Lim Ji-sub
- Lim Ju-hwan
- Lim Seul-ong
- Lim Yoon-ho
- Lomon

== M ==
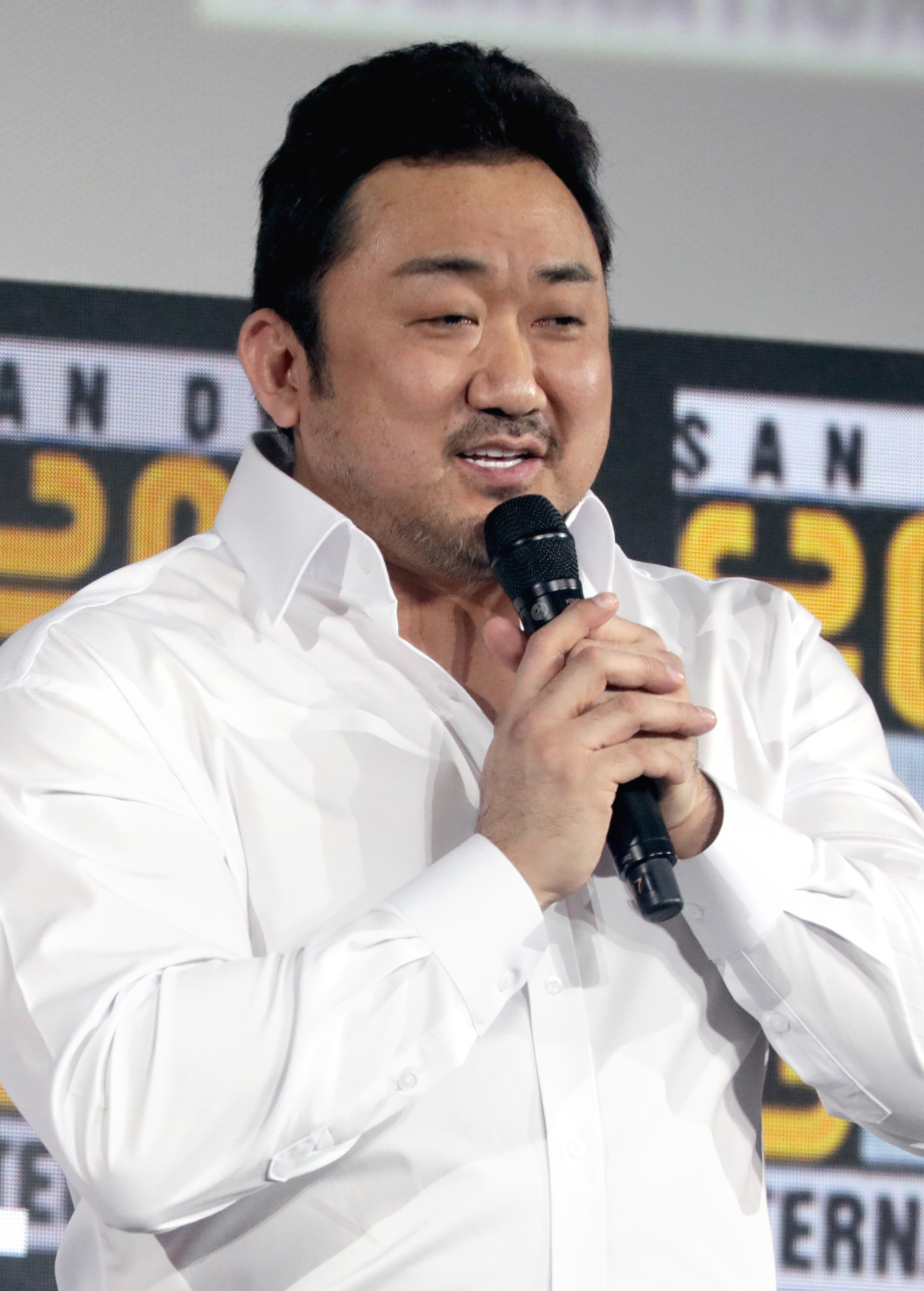
Ma Dong-seok

- Ma Dong-seok
- Maeng Sang-hoon
- Maeng Se-chang
- Marco
- Max Changmin
- MC Mong
- Min Jin-woong
- Justin H. Min
- Min Woo-hyuk
- Mingyu
- Mino
- MJ
- Moonbin
- Moon Hee-joon
- Moon Ji-hoo
- Moon Ji-yoon
- Moon Jong-up
- Moon Joon-young
- Moon Sang-min
- Moon Se-yoon
- Moon Seong-hyun
- Moon Sung-keun
- Moon Won-joo
- Moon Woo-jin
- Mu Jin-sung
- Eric Mun

== N ==
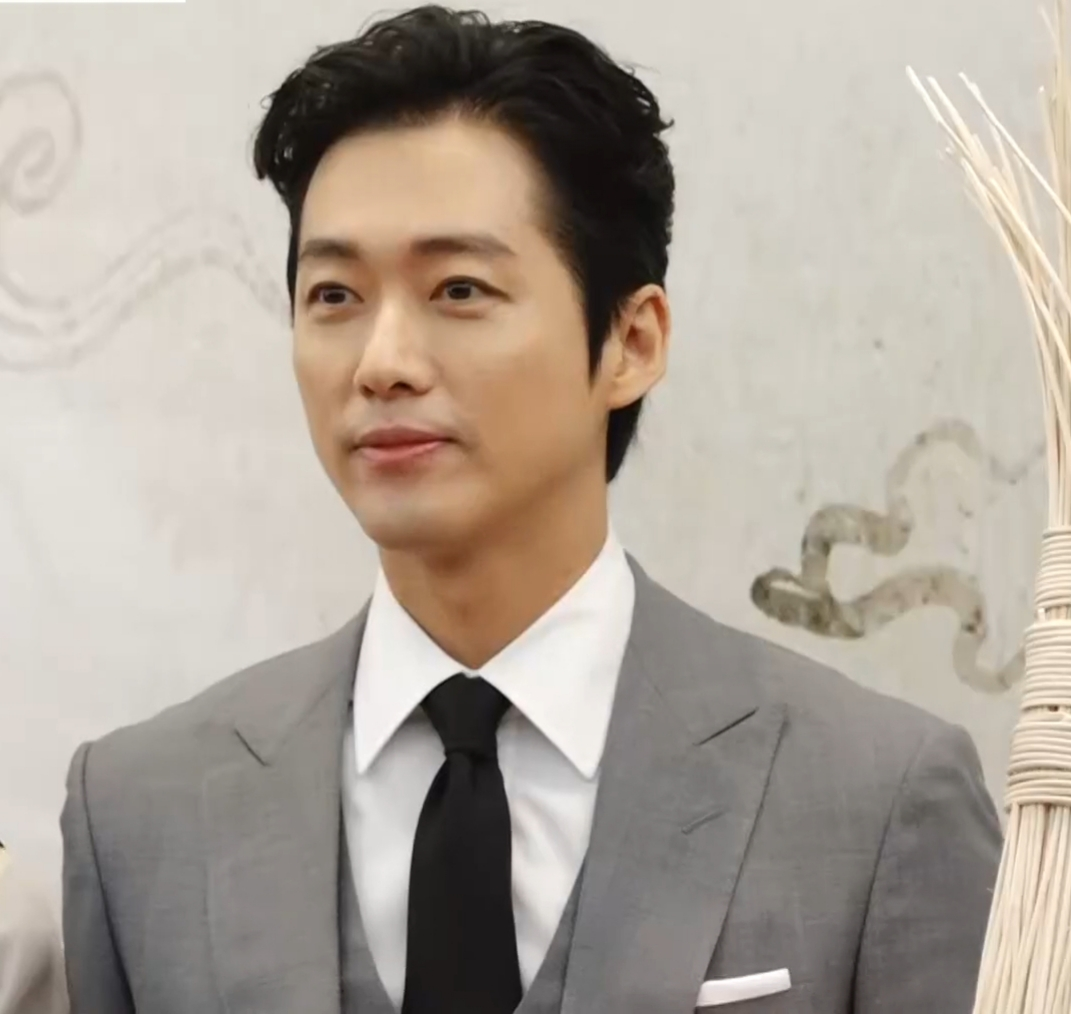
Namkoong Min

- N
- Na Hyeon
- Na In-woo
- Na Tae-ju
- Na Un'gyu
- Nam Da-reum
- Nam Doh-hyeong
- Nam Hyun-joon
- Nam Joo-hyuk
- Nam Myeong-ryeol
- Nam Tae-hyun
- Nam Woo-hyun
- Nam Yeon-woo
- Nam Yoon-su
- Namkoong Min
- Namkoong Won
- Niel
- No Min-woo
- Noh Hong-chul
- Noh Jong-hyun
- Noh Sang-hyun
- Noh Woo-jin
- Noh Young-hak

== O ==
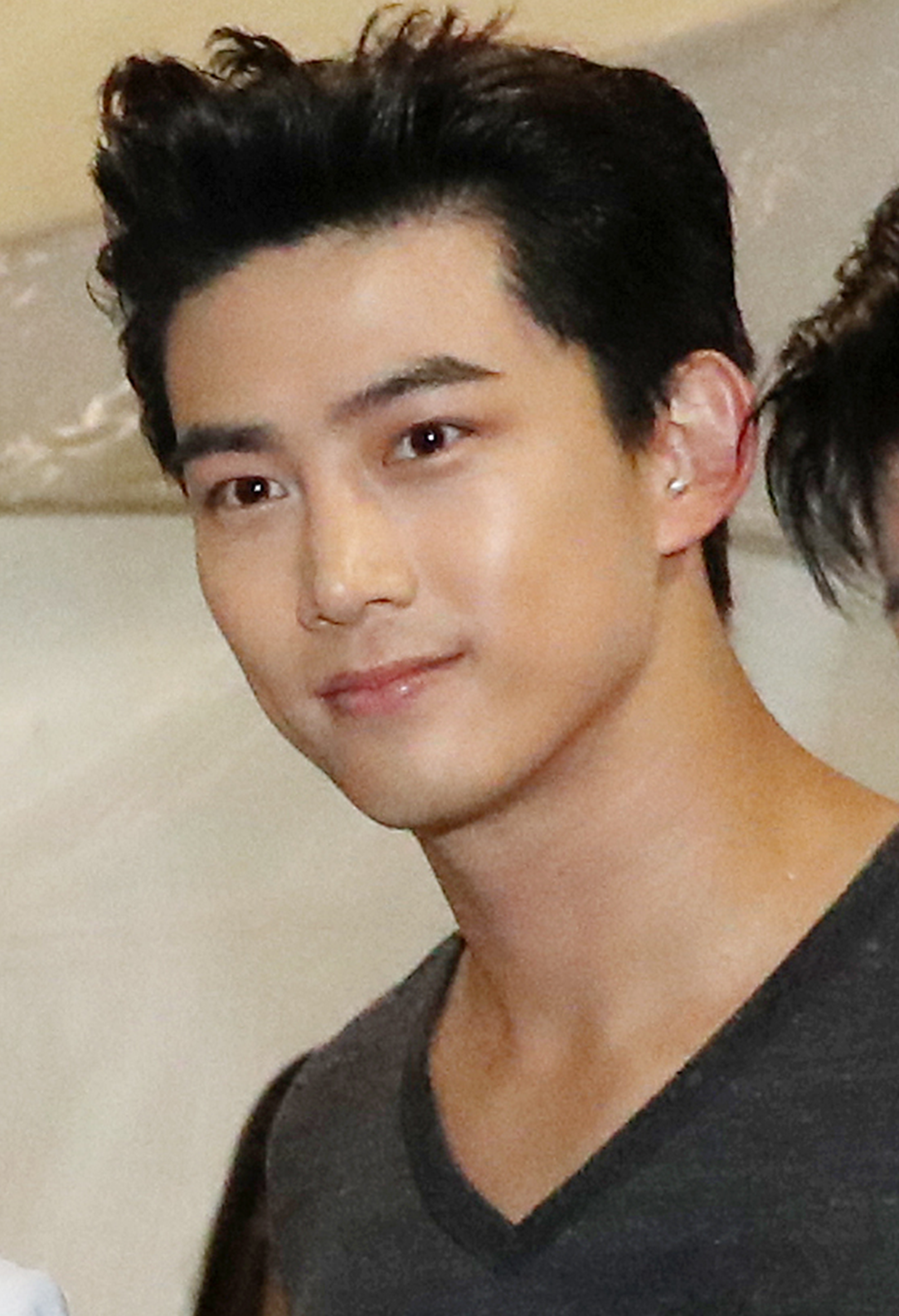
Ok Taec-yeon

- O Yeong-su
- Oh Chang-seok
- Oh Dae-gyu
- Oh Dae-hwan
- Oh Dal-su
- Oh Eui-shik
- Oh Hee-joon
- Oh Jae-moo
- Oh Ji-ho
- Oh Jong-hyuk
- Oh Jung-se
- Oh Kwang-rok
- Oh Man-seok
- Oh Min-suk
- Oh Sang-jin
- Oh Seung-hoon
- Oh Seung-myung
- Oh Seung-yoon
- Oh Shin-hwan
- Oh Sung-won
- Oh Woo-jin
- Ok Taec-yeon
- On Joo-wan
- One
- Onew
- Ong Seong-wu

== P ==
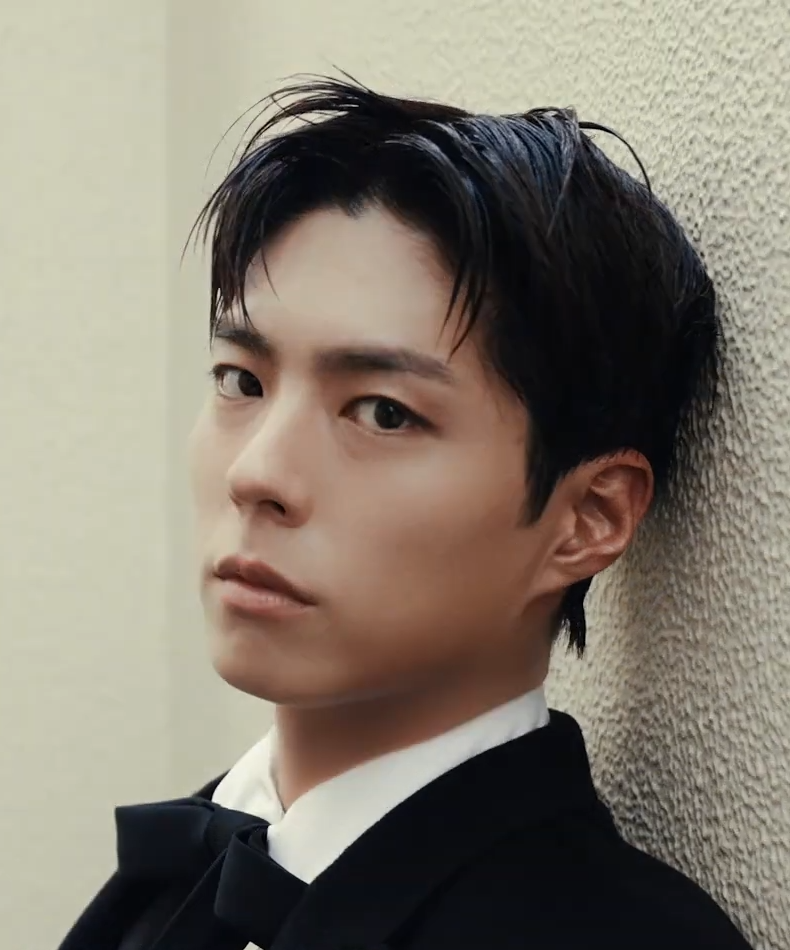
Park Bo-gum

- P.O
- Park Ah-sung
- Park Am
- Park Bo-gum
- Park Byung-eun
- Park Chul-min
- Park Chul-soo
- Park Doo-shik
- Park Eun-seok
- Park Geon-il
- Park Geun-hyung
- Park Gi-pyo
- Park Gun-hyung
- Park Gun-woo
- Park Gwang-hyun
- Park Hae-il
- Park Hae-jin
- Park Hae-joon
- Park Hae-soo
- Park Hee-soon
- Park Ho-san
- Park Hoon
- Park Hyo-jun
- Park Hyo-shin
- Park Hyuk-kwon
- Park Hyung-sik
- Park Hyung-soo
- Park In-hwan
- Park Jae-chan
- Park Jae-jung
- Jay Park
- Park Jeong-min
- Park Ji-bin
- Park Ji-hoon
- Park Ji-hwan
- Park Ji-il
- Park Ji-woo
- Park Jin-woo
- Park Jong-hwan
- Joon Park
- Park Joong-hoon
- Park Jun-gyu
- Park Jung-bum
- Park Jung-chul
- Park Jung-min
- Park Jung-woo
- J.Y. Park
- Kang-hyun Park
- Park Ki-woong
- Park Kyung
- Park Min-woo
- Park Myung-hoon
- Park Myung-soo
- Park No-sik
- Park Sang-min
- Park Sang-myun
- Park Sang-nam
- Park Sang-won
- Park Sang-wook
- Park Seo-ham
- Park Seo-joon
- Park Seong-ho
- Park Shin-yang
- Park Si-hoo
- Park Si-hwan
- Park Siwoo
- Park Soo-oh
- Park Soo-young
- Park Sun-ho
- Park Sung-hoon
- Park Sung-kwang
- Park Sung-woo
- Park Sung-woong
- Park Wan-kyu
- Park Won-sang
- Park Yeong-gyu
- Park Yong-ha
- Park Yong-woo
- Park Yoo-chun
- Park Yoon-jae
- Park Young-woon
- Park Yu-hwan
- Mahbub Alam Pollab
- Psy
- Pyo Yeong-jae

== R ==
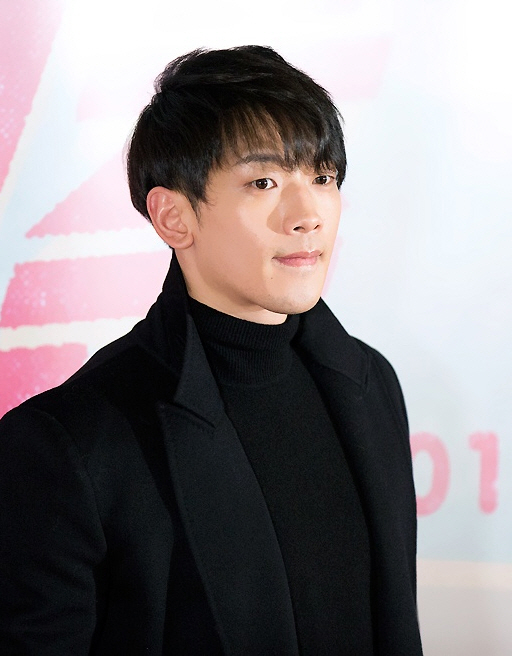
Rain

- Rain
- Ren
- Rocky
- Roh Jae-won
- Roh Joo-hyun
- Roh Tae-hyun
- Rowoon
- Ryeoun
- Ryoo Seung-bum
- Ryoo Seung-wan
- Ryu Dam
- Ryu Deok-hwan
- Ryu Jin
- Ryu Jun-yeol
- Ryu Kyung-soo
- Ryu Seung-ryong
- Ryu Seung-soo
- Ryu Si-won
- Ryu Soo-young
- Ryu Tae-joon
- Ryu Ui-hyun

== S ==
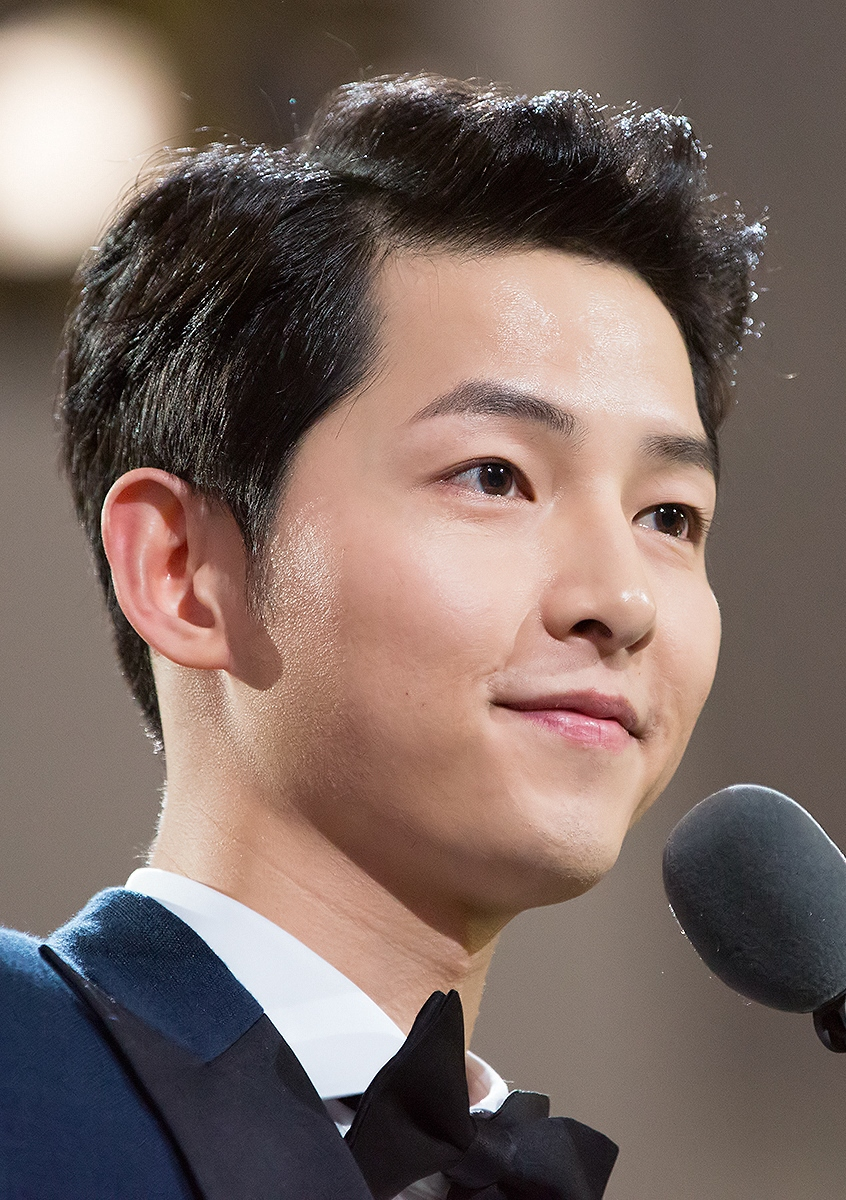
Song Joong-ki

- Samuel
- Sandeul
- Sehun
- Seo Bum-june
- Seo Do-young
- Seo Eun-kwang
- Seo Ha-joon
- Seo Hyun-chul
- Seo Hyun-woo
- Seo In-guk
- Seo In-seok
- Seo Ji-hoon
- Seo Ji-seok
- Seo Jun-young
- Seo Kang-joon
- Seo Kyung-seok
- Seo Min-woo
- Seo Sang-won
- Seo Woo-jin
- Seo Young-joo
- Seol Jung-hwan
- Seungri
- Seven
- Shim Hyung-rae
- Shim Hyung-tak
- Shim Ji-ho
- Shim Wan-joon
- Shin Cheol-jin
- Shin Dong-ho
- Shin Dong-woo
- Shin Dong-wook
- Shin Dong-yup
- Shin Goo
- Shin Ha-kyun
- Shin Hae-chul
- Shin Hyun-joon
- Shin Hyun-soo
- Shin Il-ryong
- Shin Jae-ha
- Shin Jae-hwi
- Shin Jeong-you
- Shin Jun-seop
- Shin Jung-geun
- Shin Jung-hwan
- Shin Kang-woo
- Shin Seong-il
- Shin Seung-ho
- Shin Seung-hwan
- Shin Sung-min
- Shin Sung-rok
- Shin Sung-woo
- Shin Won-ho
- Shin Yeon-shick
- Shin Young-kyun
- Shindong
- Shownu
- So Ji-sub
- Son Byong-ho
- Son Chang-min
- Son Dong-woon
- Son Ho-jun
- Son Ho-young
- Son Hyun-joo
- Son Ji-chang
- Son Jin-young
- Son Jun-ho
- Son Sang-yeon
- Son Suk-ku
- Son Seung-won
- Son Won-il
- Son Woo-hyeon
- Son Woo-hyuk
- Song Chang-eui
- Song Duk-ho
- Song Geon-hee
- Song Il-kook
- Song Jae-hee
- Song Jae-ho
- Song Jae-rim
- Song Ji-ho
- Song Jong-ho
- Song Joon-seok
- Song Joong-ki
- Song Kang
- Song Kang-ho
- Song Kwang-won
- Song Min-jae
- Song Sae-byeok
- Song Seung-heon
- Song Seung-hwan
- Song Seung-hyun
- Song Won-geun
- Song Won-seok
- Song Young-chang
- Song Young-gyu
- Song Yuvin
- Suho
- Sul Kyung-gu
- Sung Dong-il
- Sung Hoon
- Sung Hyuk
- Sung Ji-ru
- Sung Joon
- Sung Si-kyung
- Sung Yoo-bin
- Sunwoo Jae-duk

== T ==
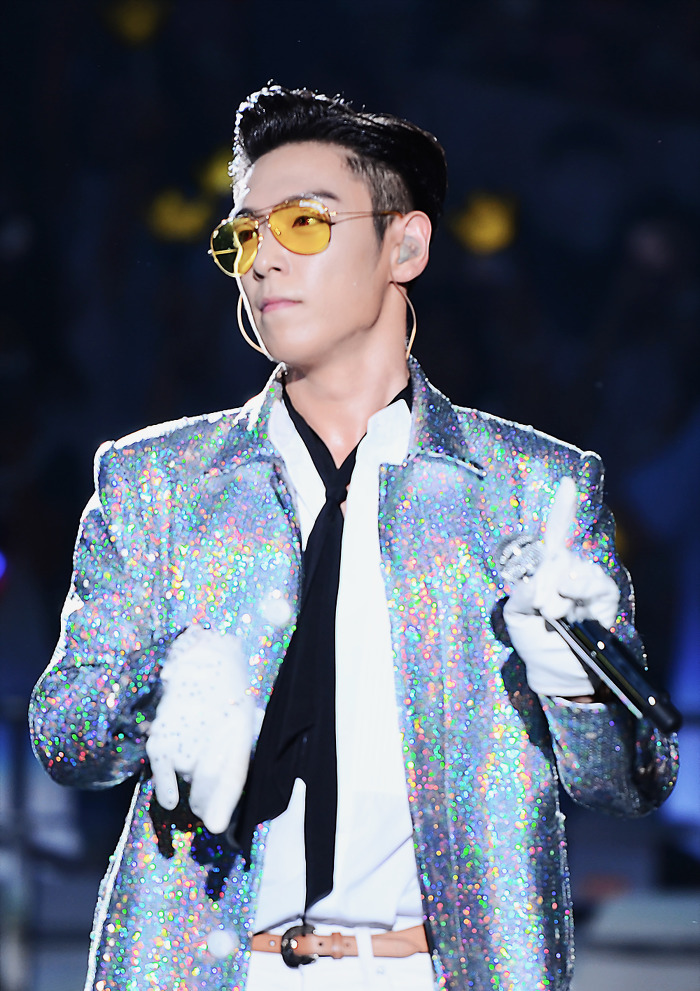
T.O.P

- T.O.P
- Tablo
- Tae Hang-ho
- Tae In-ho
- Tae Won-seok
- Taegoon
- Taemin
- Tak Jae-hoon
- Tak Jae-in
- Tang Jun-sang
- Tei
- Teo Yoo
- Thunder
- Tiger JK
- Tim

== U ==
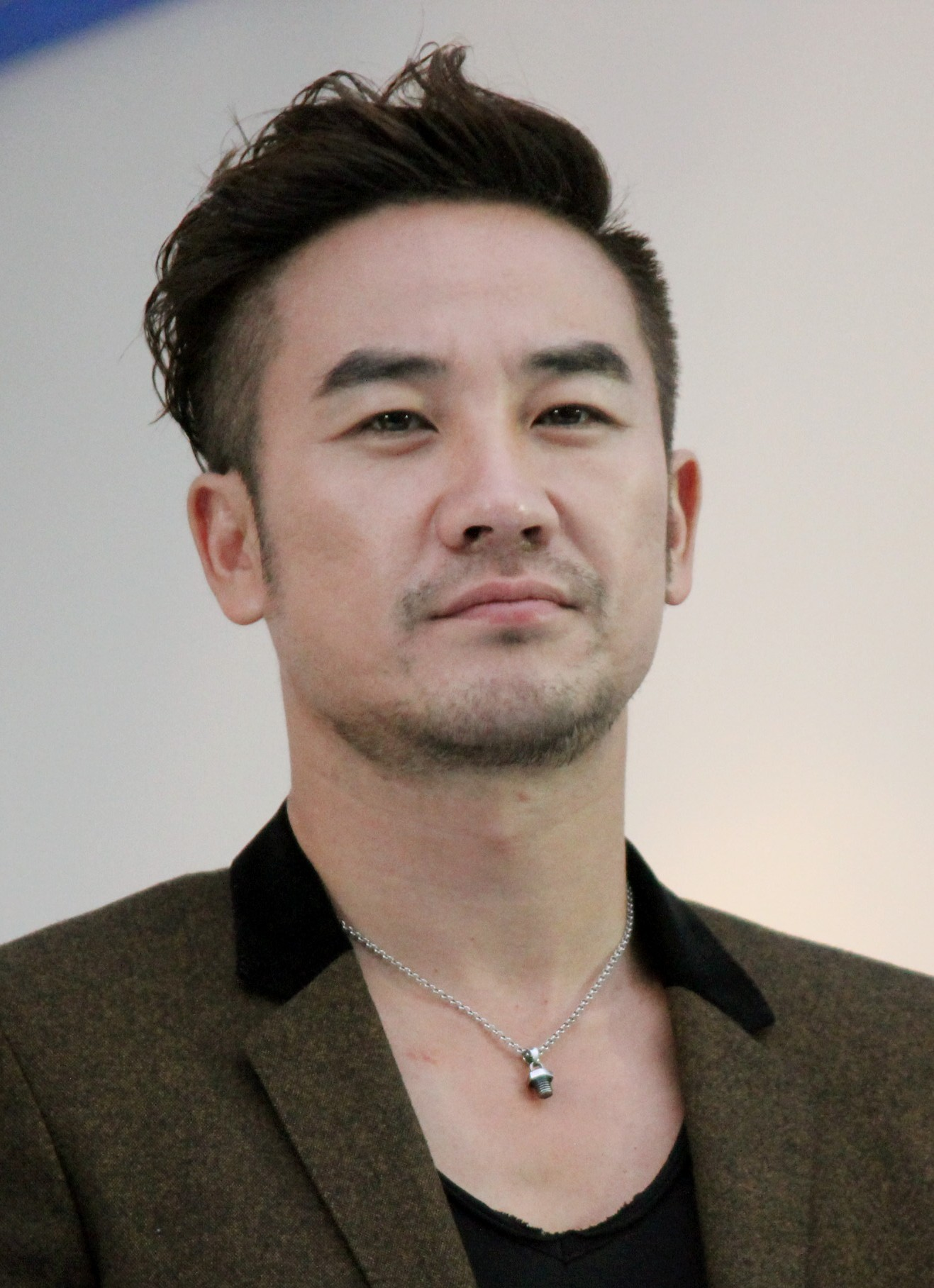
Uhm Tae-woong

- U-Kwon
- Uhm Tae-woong
- Um Hyo-sup
- Um Ki-joon
- Um Sang-hyun
- Um Tae-goo
- Um Tae-hwa

== V ==
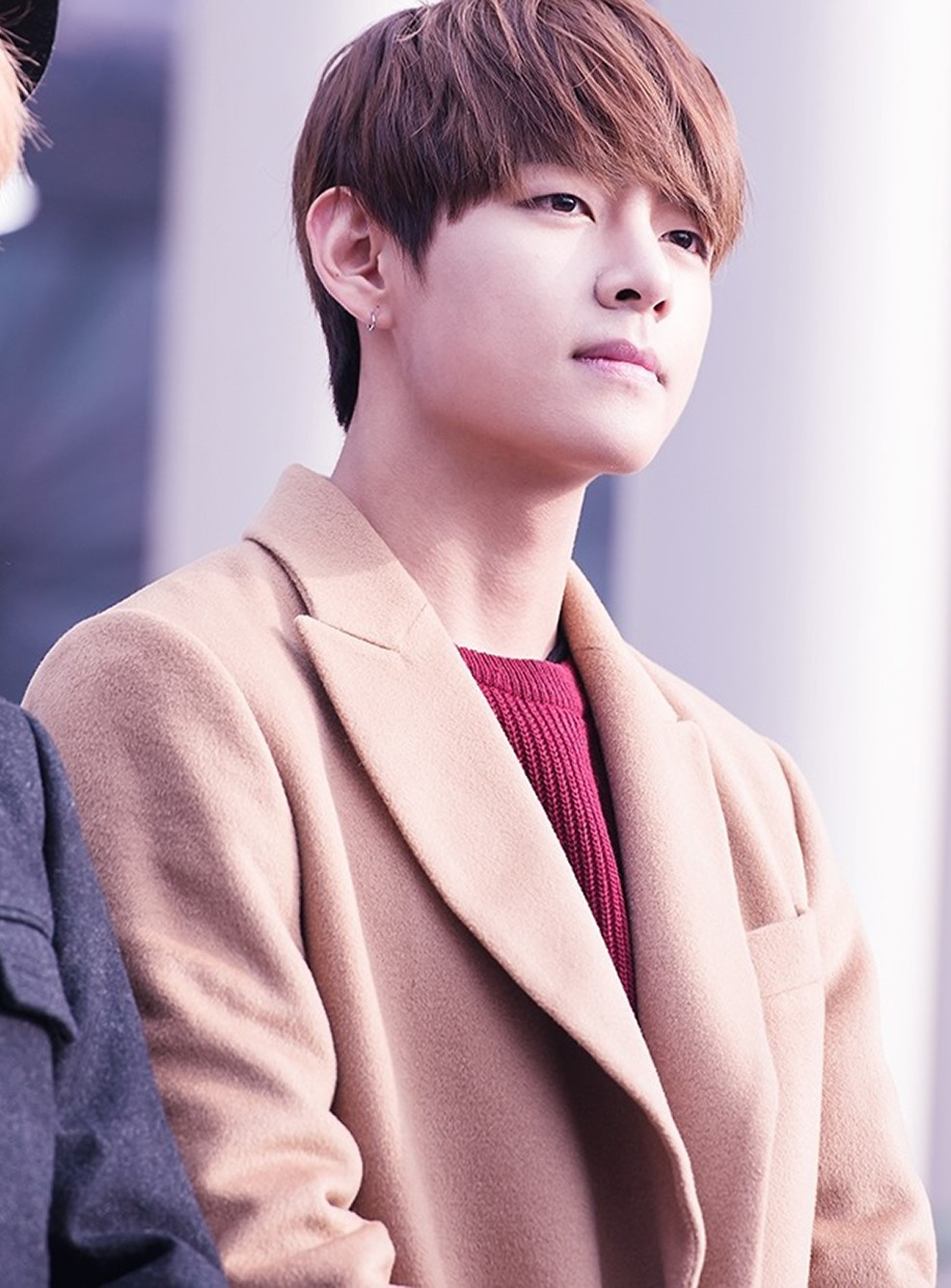
V

- V

== W ==
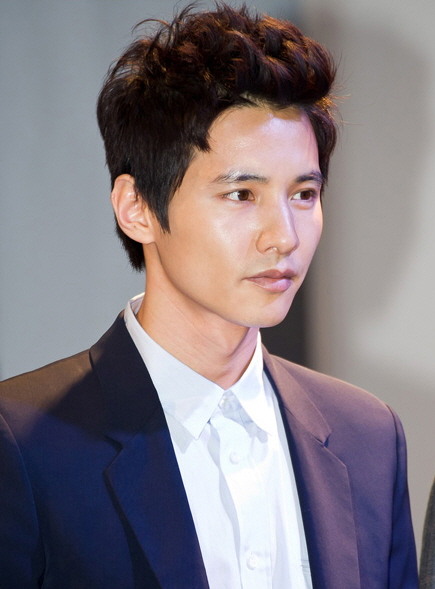
Won Bin

- Wang Seok-hyeon
- Wheesung
- Wi Ha-joon
- Won Bin
- Won Ki-joon
- Won Tae-hee
- Casanova Wong
- Wonho
- Wonpil
- Woo Do-hwan
- Woo Hyun
- Woo Ji-han
- Woo Ji-hyun
- Woo Ji-won
- Kevin Woo
- Woo Ki-hoon
- Wooseok

== X ==
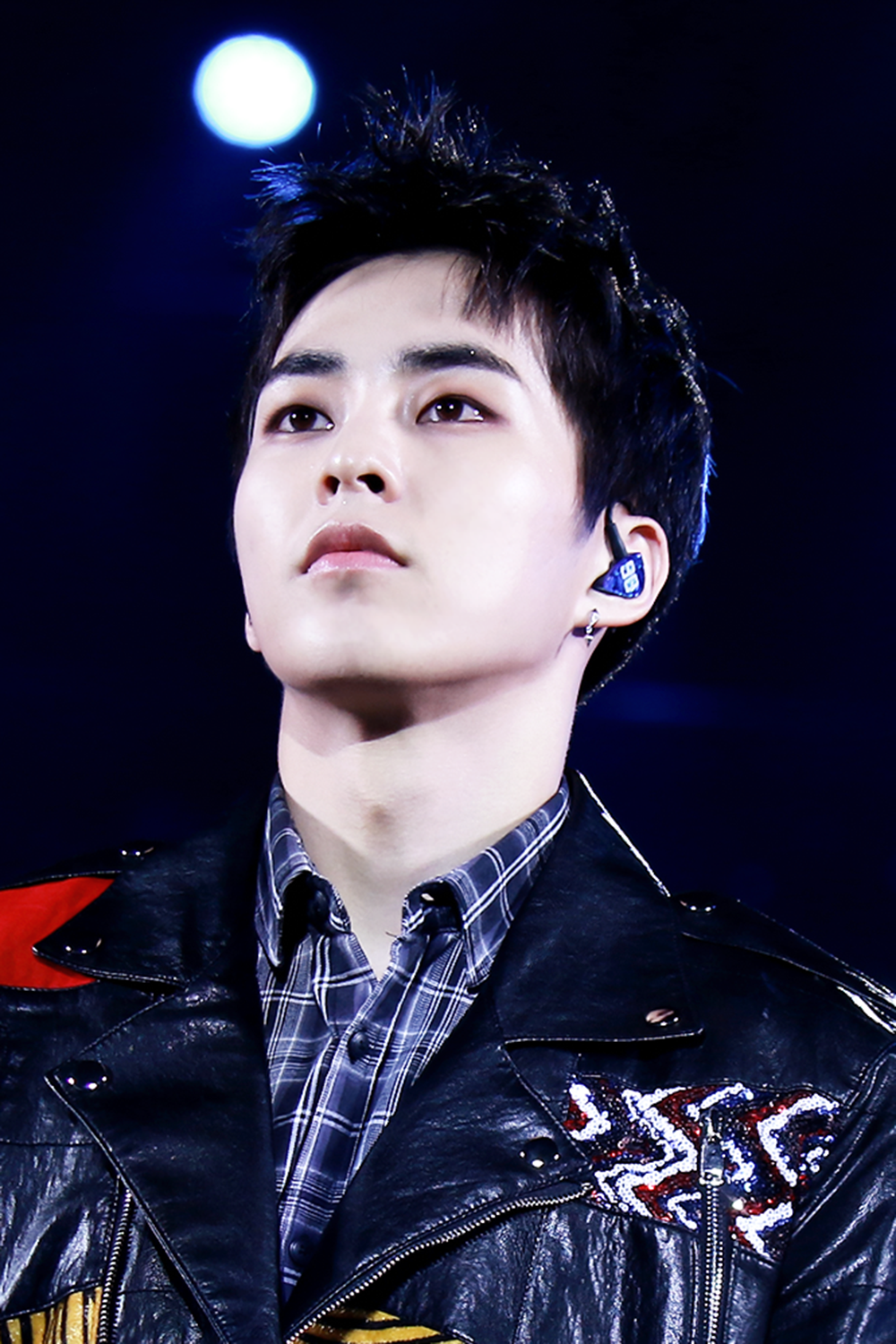
Xiumin

- Xiumin

== Y ==
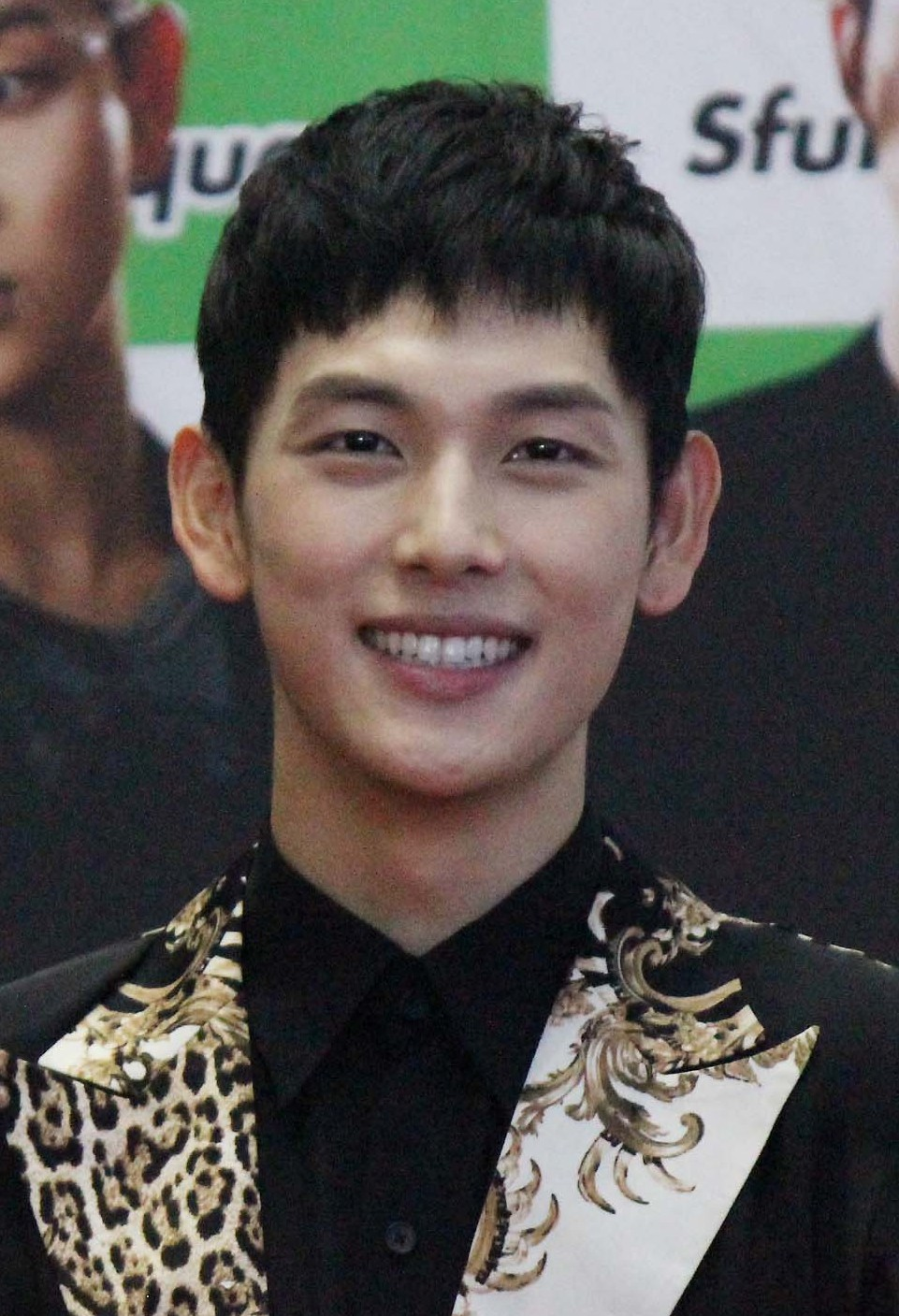
Yim Si-wan

- Yang Byung-yeol
- Yang Dae-hyuk
- Yang Dong-geun
- Yang Hak-jin
- Yang Han-yeol
- Yang Hyun-suk
- Yang Ik-june
- Yang Kyung-won
- Yang Sang-guk
- Yang Se-hyung
- Yang Se-jong
- Yang Seung-ho
- Yang Seung-pil
- Yang Yo-seob
- Yeo Hoe-hyun
- Yeo Hoon-min
- Yeo Hyun-soo
- Yeo Jin-goo
- Yeo One
- Yeom Min-hyeok
- Yeon Joon-seok
- Yeon Jung-hoon
- Yeon Woo-jin
- Yesung
- Steven Yeun
- Yi Sang-woo
- Yim Pil-sung
- Yim Si-wan
- Yong Jun-hyung
- Yoo Ah-in
- Yoo Byung-jae
- Yoo Dong-geun
- Yoo Eun-sook
- Yoo Gun
- Yoo Hae-jin
- Yoo Hee-jae
- Yoo Hwe-seung
- Yoo Il
- Yoo In-soo
- Yoo Jae-myung
- Yoo Jae-suk
- Yoo Je-yoon
- Yoo Ji-tae
- Yoo Jun-sang
- Yoo Jung-hoo
- Yoo Min-gon
- Yoo Min-kyu
- Yoo Se-hyung
- Yoo Se-yoon
- Yoo Seon-ho
- Yoo Seung-ho
- Yoo Seung-jun
- Yoo Seung-mok
- Yoo Su-bin
- Yoo Yeon-seok
- Yoo Young-jae
- Yook Sung-jae
- Yoon Chan
- Yoon Chan
- Yoon Chan-young
- Yoon Da-hoon
- Yoon Do-hyun
- Yoon Do-gun
- Yoon Doo-joon
- Yoon Hee-seok
- Yoon Hyun-min
- Yoon Hyun-suk
- Yoon Jae-chan
- Yoon Je-moon
- Yoon Ji-on
- Yoon Ji-sung
- Yoon Jong-bin
- Yoon Jong-hoon
- Yoon Jong-shin
- Yoon Joo-sang
- Yoon Jun-won
- Yoon Kye-sang
- Yoon Kyun-sang
- Yoon Kyung-ho
- Yoon Mun-sik
- Yoon Na-moo
- Yoon Park
- Yoon San-ha
- Yoon Sang-hyeon
- Yoon Sang-hyun
- Yoon Seok-hyun
- Yoon Shi-yoon
- Yoon So-ho
- Yoon Sun-woo
- Yoon Tae-young
- Yoshihiro Akiyama
- Young Mazino
- Young Tak
- Yu In-chon
- Yu Oh-seong
- Yugyeom
- Yunho

== Z ==
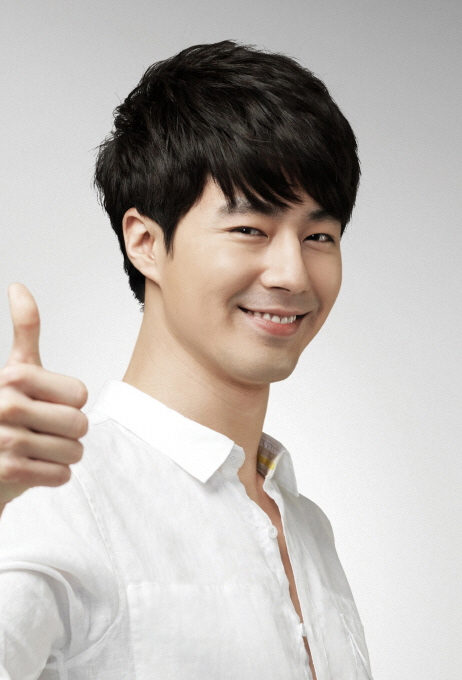
Zo In-sung

- Zizo
- Zo In-sung

== See also ==
- Korean drama
- Contemporary culture of South Korea
- List of North Korean actors
