= Always Meet Again =

2026 South Korean television series

- Promotional poster
- Hangul: 언제나 다시 만나
- RR: Eonjena dasi manna
- MR: Ŏnjena tasi manna
- Genre: Boys' love; Coming-of-age; Romantic fantasy
- Written by: Choi Ji-an; Jung Yoo-kyung
- Directed by: Shin Dong-hoon
- Country of origin: South Korea
- Original language: Korean
- No. of episodes: 8

Production
- Running time: 30 minutes
- Production companies: Moving Pictures Co.; Flash Entertainment

Original release
- Network: Heavenly
- Release: March 5 – March 26, 2026

Related
- A Breeze of Love (2023)

Always Meet Again (Korean: 언제나 다시 만나) is a South Korean boys' love television series, a spin-off of A Breeze of Love. The show aired from March 5 to March 26, 2026, with eight episodes broadcast weekly on Thursdays. Starring Kim Myeong-chan and Shin Jeong-you, the series is available on iQIYI and GagaOOLala.

== Synopsis ==
Jang Hye Seong, a renowned painter, revisits Seongjin High School to give a lecture at the request of his friend Tae Jun. While exploring the art room, he discovers his old sketchbook containing drawings of his first love, Lee U Jin. On impulse, he redraws U Jin, and upon finishing, he is mysteriously transported back to 2008, reliving his teenage years.

Determined not to repeat past mistakes, Hye Seong tries to keep his distance from U Jin. However, U Jin’s bold and persistent advances leave him conflicted. Their youth begins anew, raising the question: can they change fate and truly meet again?

== Cast ==
=== Main ===
- Kim Myeong-chan as Lee U-jin
- Shin Jeong-you – Jang Hye-seong

=== Supporting ===
- Seo Seung-hyeon as Tae-jun, a friend of U-jin and Hye-seong
- Min Do-hee as Jang Eun-ha, Hye-seong's older sister who is a nurse at Seongjin High School
- Kim Tae-hyung as an art teacher
- Kim Hyung-min as a physical education teacher

== Production ==
Always Meet Again was announced as a spin-off of A Breeze of Love, continuing BL productions by Domundi and Mondee. Promotional materials and cast preparation were released in early 2026, with the official broadcast beginning in March. TVJ and Daum reported on the series as one of the anticipated BL dramas of 2026. Slist and Job-Post covered production details and casting.

== Original soundtrack ==
=== Part 1 ===
Released on March 5, 2026
No.	Title	Lyrics	Music	Artist	Length
1.	"Maybe we've met before" (어쩌면 첫 만남이 아닐지도 몰라)	Drako	Drako; Choi Jae-hyuk	Limzy	2:13
2.	"Maybe we've met before" (어쩌면 첫 만남이 아닐지도 몰라; Inst.)		Drako; Choi Jae-hyuk		2:13
Total length:					4:26

=== Part 2 ===
Released on March 13, 2026
No.	Title	Lyrics	Music	Artist	Length
1.	"I Wanna Be With You"	Sim Kyu-tae	Sim Kyu-tae; Jay Lee	Hyun.O	3:16
2.	"I Wanna Be With You" (Inst.)		Sim Kyu-tae; Jay Lee		3:16
Total length:					6:33

=== Part 3 ===
Released on March 20, 2026
No.	Title	Lyrics	Music	Artist	Length
1.	"The Night You Were There" (네가 있던 밤)	Jay Lee; Seo Chang-ik; Sim Kyu-tae	Sim Kyu-tae; Jay Lee; Seo Chang-ik	Shin Jeong-you; Woo Ji-han	3:53
2.	"The Night You Were There" (네가 있던 밤; Inst.)		Sim Kyu-tae; Jay Lee; Seo Chang-ik		3:53
Total length:					7:46

=== Part 4 ===
Released on March 26, 2026
No.	Title	Lyrics	Music	Artist	Length
1.	"Can't Stop"	Jay Lee; Soppy	Jay Lee; Soppy	Baby Blue	4:06
2.	"Can't Stop" (Inst.)		Jay Lee; Soppy		4:06
Total length:					8:13

=== Part 5 ===
Released on April 3, 2026
No.	Title	Lyrics	Music	Artist	Length
1.	"Run"	Min Myeong-gi	Min Myeong-gi; Lee Seok-joo	Yonghoon (Onewe)	3:49
2.	"Run" (Inst.)		Min Myeong-gi; Lee Seok-joo		3:49
Total length:					7:38

== Reception ==
The series received attention from both Korean and international media. TopStarNews described the anticipation around the pairing of Shin Jeong You and Kim Myung Chan, emphasizing their on-screen chemistry. Sports Khan highlighted the nostalgic high school setting and the use of time-travel as a narrative device combined with BL romance. Osen noted that the drama contributes to the growing popularity of BL productions in South Korea.
