= Kim Yong-sik (disambiguation) =

Kim Yong-sik (김용식) may also refer to:

- Kim Yong-sik (1910–1985), South Korean footballer
- Kim Yong-shik (1913–1995), South Korean diplomat
- Kim Yong-sik (wrestler) (김영식; born 1967), North Korean sport wrestler

== See also ==
- Kim Young-sik (김영식)
