= Won-il =

- Hangul: 원일
- RR: Wonil
- MR: Wŏnil

Won-il is a Korean given name.

== People ==
People with this name include:

- Sohn Won-yil (1909–1980), South Korean navy vice admiral
- Kim Won-il (born 1942), South Korean writer
- Rhee Won-il (1960–2011), South Korean digital art curator
- Son Won-il (voice actor) (born 1962), South Korean voice actor
- Lee Won-il (born 1979), South Korean chef
- Kim Won-il (boxer) (born 1982), South Korean boxer
- Yoon Won-il (born 1983), South Korean footballer (K League 1)
- Kim Won-il (footballer) (born 1986), South Korean footballer (K League 1)
- Yoon Won-il (born 1986), South Korean footballer (K League Challenge)

== See also ==
- List of Korean given names
