= Choi Sung-won =

- Hangul: 최성원
- RR: Choe Seongwon
- MR: Ch'oe Sŏngwŏn

Choi Sung-won (Korean: 최성원) is a Korean name consisting of the family name Choi and the given name Sung-won, and may also refer to:

- Choi Sung-won (musician) (born 1954), South Korean musician
- Choi Sung-won (billiards player) (born 1977), South Korean billiards player
- Choi Sung-won (actor) (born 1985), South Korean actor
