= The Princess and the Matchmaker =

2018 South Korean film by Hong Chang-pyo

- Theatrical release poster
- Hangul: 궁합
- Hanja: 宮合
- Lit.: Marital Compatibility
- RR: Gunghap
- MR: Kunghap
- Directed by: Hong Chang-pyo
- Written by: Lee So-mi
- Produced by: Bang Mi-jung; Lee Kang-jin; Lee Gang-jin
- Starring: Shim Eun-kyung; Lee Seung-gi; Kim Sang-kyung; Yeon Woo-jin; Kang Min-hyuk; Choi Woo-shik; Jo Bok-rae
- Cinematography: Lee Hyung-deok
- Edited by: Nam Na-yeong; Kim Hyeong-joo
- Music by: Kim Dong-gi
- Production company: Jupiter Film
- Distributed by: CJ Entertainment
- Release date: February 28, 2018
- Running time: 110 minutes
- Country: South Korea
- Language: Korean
- Box office: US$9.9 million

The Princess and the Matchmaker (Korean: 궁합) is a 2018 South Korean period romantic comedy film directed by Hong Chang-pyo. The film stars Shim Eun-kyung, Lee Seung-gi, Kim Sang-kyung, Yeon Woo-jin, Kang Min-hyuk, Choi Woo-shik and Jo Bok-rae. The film tells story of a saju expert, Seo Do-yoon, who received an order from the King to help him pick a husband for his daughter, Princess Song-hwa, based on their fortune. It is the second installment of Jupiter Film's three-part film project on the Korean fortune-telling traditions, following The Face Reader which was released in 2013 and followed by Feng Shui later in 2018.

== Plot ==
Princess Songhwa of the Joseon era refuses her fate to marry one of four suitors deemed to have good marital compatibility with her. She then escapes from the palace to find the man she truly loves.

== Cast ==
- Shim Eun-kyung as Princess Songhwa
  - Lee Han-seo as Young Princess Songhwa
- Lee Seung-gi as Seo Do-yoon
- Yeon Woo-jin as Yoon Shi-kyung
- Kang Min-hyuk as Kang Hwi
- Choi Woo-shik as Nam Chi-ho
- Kim Sang-kyung as King
- Jo Bok-rae as Gae-shi
- Park Sun-young as Young-bin
- Lee Yoon-gun as Park In
- Kim Do-yeop as Jo Yoo-sang
- Kim Joo-hun as Yook Son
- Han Sung-yun as Song-hwa
- Park Choong-sun as Eunuch Jang
- Cho Soo-hyang as Man-yi
  - Lee Na-yoon as Young Man-yi
- Kim Do-yeop as Jo Yoo-sang
- Lee Yong-nyeo as Court lady Han
- Joo Da-young as Princess Yeo-hee
- Min Areum as Princess 3
- Son Seong-chan as Judge 2
- Park Won-ho as Sang-moon
- Lee Jung-hyun as Ugly man 1
- Yoon Yoo-sun as Eu'ahri
- Song Yeong-jae as Royal Observatory professor
- Song Kwang-won as Princess 1's suitor
- Lee Sun-bin as Princess 1
- Han Ji-an as Gisaeng 1
- Ahn Ji-ho as Deok-goo
- Choi Min-ho as Seo Ga-yoon
- Park Jin-joo as Ok-hee

== Production ==
Principal photography began on September 9, 2015 and wrapped on December 23, 2015.

== Release ==
On January 31, 2018, a promotional press conference was held with the main cast and the director at the event. The main trailer for the film was unveiled on February 9, 2018. The Princess and the Matchmaker was released in the local cinemas on February 28, 2018.

== Reception ==
According to Korean Film Council, The Princess and the Matchmaker topped the local box office on the first day of its release and attracted 175,022 audiences.

During the first weekend since the film was released at 965 screens, The Princess and the Matchmaker drew 489,702 moviegoers accounting for 29.1 percent of the weekend's ticket sales.

The film maintained the number one spot for six consecutive days since its release and surpassed one million viewers on its seventh day.

During the second weekend the film was viewed by 157,084 audiences and fell to fourth place at the Korean box office.
