= Han Sang-hyeok =

Han Sang-hyuk may refer to:

- Han Sang-hyeok (voice actor)
- Hyuk (singer)
