= Sung-won =

- Hangul: 성원
- RR: Seongwon
- MR: Sŏngwŏn

Sung-won, also spelled Seong-won, is a Korean given name.

People with this name include:

- Yu Sŏngwŏn (died 1456), Joseon Dynasty scholar-official
- Hong Sung-won (born 1937), South Korean writer
- Sung Won Sohn (born 1944), South Korean-born American economist
- Oh Sung-won (born 1972), South Korean musical theatre actor
- Choi Sung-won (billiards player) (born 1977), South Korean billiards player
- Hwang Geum-hee (born 1977), South Korean actress formerly known by the stage name Ji Sung-won
- Choi Sung-won (actor) (born 1985), South Korean actor
- SungWon Cho (born 1990), Korean-American actor, voice actor, sketch comedian, and YouTuber
- Sung-Won Yang, 21st-century South Korean cellist

== See also ==
- List of Korean given names
