= Woo Ji-han =

South Korean actor (born 2000)

- Born: Kim Myeong-chan; 2 June 2000 (age 26); South Korea
- Education: Chung-Ang University (Creative writing)
- Occupation: Actor
- Years active: 2022–present
- Known for: A Breeze of Love (2023); Adulting at Eighteen (2023); I Am Calling off My Wedding with the Male Lead (2024); Always Meet Again (2026)

Korean name
- Hangul: 김명찬
- RR: Gim Myeongchan
- MR: Kim Myŏngch'an

Stage name
- Hangul: 우지한
- RR: U Jihan
- MR: U Chihan

Kim Myeong-chan (Korean: 김명찬; born 2 June 2000), stage name Woo Ji-han (우지한), is a South Korean actor who gained popularity in 2023 for starring in the BL series A Breeze of Love and the film Adulting at Eighteen. He is also known for his roles in I Am Calling off My Wedding with the Male Lead (2024) and Always Meet Again (2026).

== Career ==
In 2022, Woo Ji-han appeared in dramas such as Mimicus and Revenge of Others.

In 2023, he starred in the BL series A Breeze of Love, released on GagaOOLala, alongside Shin Jeong-you. That same year, he played the lead role in the film Adulting at Eighteen.

In 2024, Woo took part in the series I Am Calling off My Wedding with the Male Lead.

In 2026, he reunited with Shin Jeong-you in the BL drama Always Meet Again.

== Filmography ==
=== Television ===
Year	Title	Role	Notes
2026	Always Meet Again	Jang Hye-seong	Lead role
2025	The First Night with the Duke (남주의 첫날밤을 가져버렸다)	Jeon-su (Ep. 3)	Guest
2024	I Am Calling off My Wedding with the Male Lead	Lee Hae-won	Lead role
2023	A Breeze of Love	Lee Do-hyeon	Lead role
2023	Delicious Deception (이로운 사기)	Yu Neung	Supporting role
2022	Revenge of Others (3인칭 복수)	Choi Eun-hyeok	Guest
2022	Mimicus	Hyeon-u	Supporting role

=== Film ===
Year	Title	Role	Notes
2023	Adulting at Eighteen	Soo Chan	Lead role
