= An Jong-deok =

South Korean voice actor

An Jong Deok (안종덕, born 1972) is a South Korean voice actor.

He joined the MBC's voice acting division in 1994.

== Roles ==
=== Broadcast TV ===
- Hwaje JipJoong (Narration, MBC)
- Futari wa Pretty Cure (Korea TV Edition, SBS)
- Mega Ranger (Power Rangers, Korea TV Edition, SBS)
- Shippū! Iron Leaguer (Korea TV Edition, SBS)
- Beast Wars (Korea TV Edition, SBS)
- Slam Dunk (Korea TV Edition, SBS)
- Olympus Guardian (SBS)
- Beyblade (Top Blade, Korea TV Edition, SBS)
- Tennis of King (Korea TV Edition, SBS)
- Power Force Ranger (Power Rangers, Korea TV Edition, SBS)

== See also ==
- Munhwa Broadcasting Corporation
- MBC Voice Acting Division
