= Oh Seung-myung =

South Korean actor (1946–2024)

- 오승명
- Born: January 18, 1946; U.S.-occupied Korea
- Died: August 25, 2024 (aged 78); Seoul, South Korea
- Occupation: Actor
- Years active: 1964–2024

Oh Seung-myung (Korean: 오승명; January 18, 1946 – August 25, 2024) was a South Korean actor.

Oh made his debut as a stage actor in 1964. He died on August 25, 2024, at the age of 78.

== Selected filmography ==
=== Film ===
Year	Title	Role
1987	Pillar of Mist	Him
1987	Hello Lim Ggug Jeong	Pastor Choi
1990	The Woman Who Walks on Water	
1991	Passion Portrait	Professor Yu
1991	Seoul Evita	
1991	Fire and Blood	Fasting Director
1991	Lost Love	Yoon Hee Bu
1994	Sado Sade Impotence	
2000	Bichunmoo	Yeongil
2002	Public Enemy	Jo Myeong-cheol
2003	Sword in the Moon	Affinity
2005	Quiz King	Jin Man Bu
