= Han Kyoo-hee =

South Korean voice actor (1944–2014)

Han Kyoo-hee (Korean: 한규희; March 29, 1944 – December 18, 2014) is a South Korean voice actor.

He joined the Munhwa Broadcasting Corporation's voice acting division in 1964.

== Death ==
Han Kyoo-hee died on 18 December 2014.

== Roles ==
=== Broadcasting TV ===
- 24 (Season 2, replacing John Terry, Korea TV Edition, MBC)
- Akazukin Chacha (Korea TV Edition, MBC)
- Alps Sound (MBC)
- Bakusou Kyoudai Let's & Go!! WGP (Korea TV Edition, SBS)
- Buffy the Vampire Slayer (replacing Anthony Head, Korea TV Edition, MBC)
- Captain Tailer (Korea TV Edition, SBS)
- CSI: Crime Scene Investigation (replacing Marc Vann, Korea TV Edition, MBC)
- Dragon Ball (Korea TV Edition, SBS)
- Escaflowne (Korea TV Edition, SBS)
- Frog Wangnooni (SBS)
- Great Gunder (Korea TV Edition, SBS)
- Hekcle Jeckle (Korea TV Edition, MBC)
- K-Cops (Korea TV Edition, MBC)
- Pigeon Chorus (MBC)
- Super SWAT (MBC)

== See also ==
- Munhwa Broadcasting Corporation
- MBC Voice Acting Division
