= Bak Tae-ho =

Korean voice actor

- Born: May 19, 1947 (age 79)
- Occupation: Voice actor
- Employer: Munhwa Broadcasting Corporation

Korean name
- Hangul: 박태호
- RR: Bak Taeho
- MR: Pak T'aeho

Bak Tae-ho (born May 19, 1947) is a South Korean voice actor.

He joined the Munhwa Broadcasting Corporation's voice acting division in 1972.

== Roles ==
=== Broadcast television ===
- E-Mark (narration, MBC)
- Miracle Girls (Korea TV Edition, MBC)
- Dok Go Tak (MBC)
- Sapire Prince (MBC)
- Space Sheriff Jango (MBC)
- Tom Soyer's Adventure (MBC)
- Gerrison Trooper (Korea TV Edition in 1971, MBC)

=== Broadcast radio ===
- History 50 (MBC)

== See also ==
- Munhwa Broadcasting Corporation
- MBC Voice Acting Division
