= Tak Jae-in =

South Korean voice actor

Tak Jae-in (Korean: 탁재인) is a South Korean voice actor. He joined the Munhwa Broadcasting Corporation's voice acting division in 1974.

== Roles ==
=== Broadcast TV ===
- Sonic (Korea TV Edition, MBC)
- Inspector Gadget (Korea TV Edition, MBC)
- Peterpan's Adventure (Korea TV Edition, MBC)

=== Broadcasting radio ===
- History 50 (MBC)

=== Film dubbing ===
- Lethal Weapon 3 (replacing Danny Glover, Korea TV Edition, MBC)
- Pocheongcheon (Korea TV Edition, MBC)

== See also ==
- Munhwa Broadcasting Corporation
