= Han Sang-hyeok (voice actor) =

South Korean voice actor

Han Sang-hyeok (Korean: 한상혁) is a South Korean voice actor who joined the Munhwa Broadcasting Corporation's voice acting division in 1970. He later became chairman of the Korea Communications Commission.

== Roles ==
=== Broadcast TV ===
- Slayers (Korea TV Edition, SBS)
- Slayers TRY (Korea TV Edition, SBS)
- Mega Ranger (Korea TV Edition, SBS)
- Nadia: The Secret of Blue Water (Korea TV Edition, MBC)
- Olympus Guardian (SBS) - Cronus
- Tecaman (Korea TV Edition, SBS)
- Rushman (Korea TV Edition, MBC)
- Tai's Adventure (Korea TV Edition, SBS)
- The Powerpuff Girls (Korea TV Edition, SBS) - Mojo Jojo

== See also ==
- Munhwa Broadcasting Corporation
- MBC Voice Acting Division
