= Lee You-cheong =

South Korean ballet dancer

Lee You Cheong
- Born: 이유청; 12 January 1986 (age 40)
- Occupations: Dancer; actor
- Years active: 2005–present

- Korean name
- Hangul: 이유청
- Hanja: 李油淸
- RR: I Yucheong
- MR: I Yuch'ŏng

Lee You Cheong (Korean: 이유청; born January 12, 1986) is a South Korean male ballet dancer and actor.

== Career ==
=== Performance/play ===
- The Sleeping Beauty by Guest in Korea National Ballet (2005)
- Opera a Masked Ball (2005)
- Opera the Elixir of Love (2007)
- Chicago Dance Festival (2008–2009)
- New York Midpoint Project (2011)
- New York Broadway Dance Show (2011)

=== Musical theater in Korea ===
- Musical Notre-Dame de Paris (2009.8–9)
- Musical Elisabeth (2012.2–5)
- Musical Hero (2012.10–11)
- Musical Joseph and the Amazing Technicolor Dreamcoat (2013.2–4)
- Musical Notre-Dame de Paris (2013.9–12)
- Musical Frankenstein (2014)

=== Television shows in Korea ===
- 2011.1.17 tvN Love Switch
- 2013.5.3 KBS Music Bank show of Younha - "The Reason We Broke Up"
- 2013.5.9 Mnet M Countdown show of Younha - "The Reason We Broke Up"
- 2013.5.11 MBC Music Core show of Younha - "The Reason We Broke Up"

=== Music video appearances ===
- 2013 Younha - "The Reason We Broke Up"
