= Oh Seung-yoon =

South Korean actor (born 1991)

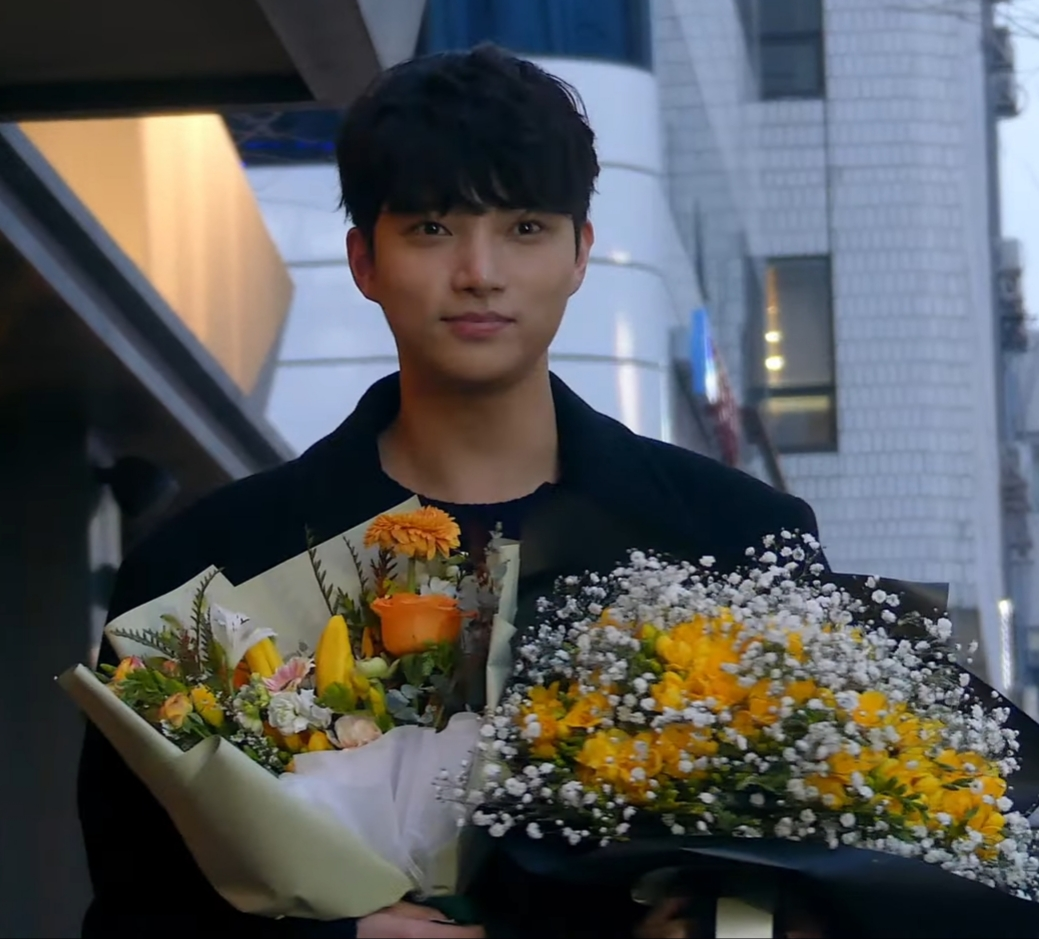
- Oh in 2019
- Born: March 27, 1991 (age 35); Yangcheon District, Seoul, South Korea
- Education: Hanyang University – Theatre and Film
- Occupation: Actor
- Years active: 1994–present
- Agent: RSP Company

Korean name
- Hangul: 오승윤
- RR: O Seungyun
- MR: O Sŭngyun

Oh Seung-yoon (Korean: 오승윤; born March 27, 1991) is a South Korean actor. He began his career as a child actor.

== Filmography ==
=== Television series ===
Year	Title	Role	Ref.
1996	Salted Mackerel		
1996–1997	Illusion		
1997	70 Minutes		
2000	Ajumma		
2001–2002	Ladies of the Palace	Bok Sung-goon	
2002–2004	Magic Kid Masuri	Ma Soo-ri	
2004	Jang Gil-san	Lee Ji-yong	
2004–2005	Toji, the Land	Lee Hong (young)	
2004–2005	Immortal Admiral Yi Sun-sin	Ryu Seong-ryong (young)	
2005–2006	Ballad of Seodong	Bum-saeng	
2006–2007	Jumong	Chun-Doong	
2007	Capital Scandal	Sun Woo-min	
2007	The Legend	Hyun-go (young)	
2008	The Great King, Sejong	Emperor Yingzong of Ming	
2008	Elephant		
2009	The Queen Returns	Na Sun-nam	
2010–2011	The King of Legend	Boo Yeo-geun	
2012	Love Rain	Jo Soo	
2013	Special Affairs Team TEN 2	Shim Yi-ho (ep. 3)	
2013	Ugly Alert	Lee Kyung-rae (ep. 6–7)	
2013	Goddess of Fire	Lee Yook-do (young)	
2014	12 Years Promise	Jang Hoon	
2014	Ugly Miss Young-ae 13	Lee Young-min	
2015	Love on a Rooftop	Yoon Seung-jae	
2016–2017	KBS TV Novel: "That Sun in the Sky"	Kang Han-soo	
2017	KBS Drama Special: "Kang Duk-soon's Love History"	Kim Seok-sam	
2018	The Last Empress	Lee Yoon	
2022	Cleaning Up	Byeong Ryul	
2022	Blind	Chef Charles	
2023	Perfect Marriage Revenge	Yoo Se-Hyuk	

=== Web series ===
Year	Title	Role	Ref.
2022	DMZ Daeseong-dong	Sergeant Seo-jun	

=== Film ===
Year	Title	Role
2015	Martial Arts Detective: Chinatown	Lee Jo-young
2016	Grand Father	Kim Kyu-young
2017	Warriors of the Dawn	Prince Imhae (cameo)

== Voice acting ==
=== Film (Korean dubbing) ===
Year	Title	Role
1994	The Lion King	
1995	Toy Story	Andy Davis
1996	Tarzan	Tarzan
2000	The Emperor's New Groove	Emperor Kuzco
2001	Harry Potter and the Philosopher's Stone	Harry Potter
2002	Harry Potter and the Chamber of Secrets	Harry Potter
2005	Olympus Guardian	Triton
2010	Toy Story 3	Andy Davis
2010	The Chronicles of Narnia: The Voyage of the Dawn Treader	Edmund Pevensie
2010	How to Train Your Dragon	Hiccup Horrendous Haddock III
2014	How to Train Your Dragon 2	Hiccup Horrendous Haddock III

=== Television series ===
Year	Title	Role
2002–2003	Olympus Guardian	Triton

== Awards and nominations ==
Year	Award	Category	Nominated work	Result
2001	9th SBS Drama Awards	Best Young Actor	Ladies of the Palace	Won
2002	16th KBS Drama Awards	Best Young Actor	Magic Kid Masuri	Won
2009	23rd KBS Drama Awards	Best Young Actor	The Queen Returns	Nominated
