= Bae Eun-sik =

South Korean actor

Bae Eun-sik is a resident of Incheon, South Korea who has acted as North Korean leader Kim Jong-il in movies, television shows, and commercials.

Bae's career began in 2000 when he won a Kim look-alike contest in Seoul. "When inter-Korean relations flourished after the 2000 summit, I was swamped with proposals to appear in movies, ads, television talk shows and media interviews. But when the ties frayed, I was forgotten and had a hard life," said Bae in The Korea Times.

A fellow Kim impersonator, Kim Young-sik, called himself a "rising star" in contrast to the "falling star" of Bae. "I am a real celebrity. I've just heard there is another man who claims he resembles Kim Jong-il the most, but I don't think so." said Bae, in a reference to Kim Young-sik. Bae takes his job seriously, adjusting his appearance to match that of the chairman. "When I recently saw a newspaper picture of the leader, who apparently has lost a considerable amount of hair and whose face looked rather pale, I felt sorry for him. If he loses his weight, I also have to go on a diet."
