= Lee Ju-il =

- Born: Jung Ju-il (정주일); 24 October 1940; Kosong County, Kōgen Province, Korea, Empire of Japan
- Died: 27 August 2002 (aged 61); National Cancer Center, Goyang, South Korea
- Occupations: Comedian; actor; politician

Korean name
- Hangul: 이주일
- Hanja: 李朱一
- RR: I Juil
- MR: I Chuil

Lee Ju-il (Korean: 이주일; October 24, 1940 – August 27, 2002), birth name Jung Ju-il, was a South Korean comedian, actor, and politician who served as the Representative of the Democratic Liberal Party for Guri Gyronggi-do from 1992 to 1996. He was called "King of Comedy" in the 1980s.

== Early and personal life ==
Lee Ju-il was born on October 24, 1940, in Goseong-gun, Gangwon-do as fifth generation only son of his family. He graduated from Chuncheon high school and completed Business School at Kyungwon University. He started his comedian career at Defense Agency for Public Information Services in 1960 and debuted as a host of morning star performance group in 1965.

Lee made his debut on television with TBC's 'It's Saturday, everybody', and became very popular from MBC's 'If you laugh, blessings will come your way.' His ugly looks were a big obstacle to making a debut on television, but it became his strong selling point, then finally he is called as 'King of Comedy' in the 1980s. He created many popular culture languages such as 'I am sorry for my bad looks', and many people imitated his 'duck dance' to the tune of the song, Susie Q for a long time. Along with comedian Lee Sang-hae he became a part of popular duo of comedy programs in television.

Lee was elected to the 14th Korean National Assembly in 1992. He finished political career commenting, "I learned a lot about comedy", and returned to his comedian career in 1996.

Lee returned to television with late night talk show, Lee Ju-il Tonight Show on SBS. The show was very popular for his satire and humor on politics, business communities, society, and culture. He retired from his career after finishing the 100th episode of Lee Ju-il Tonight Show.

Lee served as the president of sponsors on Korea National Council on Social Welfare in 1985. He also served as a founding president of Korea Comedy Research Society, an honorary chairperson of the Acting division of the Entertainer Association, and a vice-president of BBS Korea.

Lee lost his only son to a motorcycle accident in November 1991; however, he appeared on a special program for opening a new broadcasting station, SBS, three days after the funeral and made the audience laugh by saying, "I am sorry, everyone. I want to make an apology for something. I am terribly sorry that I couldn't improve the relation between Kim Yong-sam and Park Chul-un." He smoked more after his son's death. He conducted anti-smoking campaigns after diagnosed with Lung cancer on November 17, 2001. He died of lung cancer on August 27, 2002, 3:15pm at National Cancer Center. He was buried in Chuncheon Gyoungchun Park.

== Career ==
=== Television ===
- If you laugh, blessings will come your way (MBC, 1979)
- Great March on Sunday night (MBC, 1981)
- Youth March
- Hurray, Youth
- Famous spot for Humour (KBS)
- Lee Ju-il's Tonight Show (SBS, 1996–1997)
- Lee Ju-Il's Comedy Show (SBS, 1997–1998)

=== Films ===
- President Lee Pa-tong (1980)
- Let Me Show You Something (Mwonga bo-yeodeuligess-eubnida) (1980)
- A Man with Nickname (1980)
- Wish to Live in Peace (Jo-yonghi salgo sipda) (1980)
- Man Who Couldn't Be Persuaded (Yeolbeon jjig-eodo anneom-eojin sana-i) (1980)
- The Barefoot in Pyongyang (Pyeong-yangmaenbal) (1980)
- Not Looks But the Heart (Eolgul-i anigo maeum-ibnida) (1983)

=== Commercials ===
- Nongshim Cleopatra
- KT International Calling Service 001

=== Pop culture languages ===
- Did you season bean sprout well?
- I am sorry for my bad looks.
- I will show you something.
- Just have a look.

=== Commercial after death ===
Lee's snapshots from his talk shows, and entertainment programs were used on Eyoudirect commercial of Heungkuk Fire & Marin Insurance company in 2007. The snapshots include one of Bruce Lee. The fellow comedian Lee Bong-won mimicked Lee's voice on this commercial. Although Lee had died more than five years before, people were reminded of him by this commercial. The proceeds from this commercial were donated to charity in accordance with the will of Lee and his family.

== Awards ==
- 20th Baeksang Arts Awards: Television Award, Most Popular - Male (1984)
- MBC Drama Awards, Best Comedian (1985)
- 22nd Baeksang Arts Awards: Television Award, Best Variety Performer - Male (1986)
- Order of Civil Merit, Moranjang

== Publications ==
- It Makes Sense (1985)
- A Critical Biography of Lee Ju-il, Crooked Clown
- Memoir, Life is not Comedy - published after he died

== Anecdotes ==
- Lee saved singer Ha Chunhwa's life from Iri Station Explosion accident. He was unknown to the public, but he became very famous with this story.
- When Lee was with a performance group, he was beaten at a police station then released because of facial appearance. The police misidentified him as a spy because of his ugly looks.

== Election results ==
Year	Elections	Constituency	Political party	Votes (%)	Results
1992	14th National Assembly General Election	Guri (Gyeonggi)	UNP	25,751 (45.34%)	Won
