= A Breeze of Love =

2023 South Korean television series

- Also known as: Weather Forecast Romance
- 일기예보적연애
- Genre: Boys' love, Drama, Romance, Sports
- Directed by: Kim Ah Young
- Country of origin: Korea
- Original language: Korean language
- No. of seasons: 1
- No. of episodes: 8

Production
- Running time: 18 minutes

Original release
- Release: November 10, 2023

A Breeze of Love (Korean: 일기예보적연애) is a 2023 South Korean television series produced by WhyNot Media and released on iQIYI. Directed by Kim Ah Young, the main cast features Shin Jeong-you and Kim Myeong-chan.

== Synopsis ==
Dong Uk struggles with chronic insomnia, haunted by nightly visions that prevent him from resting. Unexpectedly, he finds peace when sleeping beside Do Hyeon, sparking a unique bond between them. Although they feel deeply connected, cracks begin to show in their relationship: Dong Uk tries to hold on, while Do Hyeon fears what lies ahead once the happy moments fade. Much like a weather forecast, their love proves unpredictable, shifting between calm and turbulence.

== Cast ==
=== Main ===
- Shin Jeong-you as Ban Dong Uk
- Woo Ji-han as Lee Do Hyeon

=== Supporting ===
- Kim Hyun Jae as Yang Seung Ju
- Lee Seo Bin as Kim Hye In

== Production ==
The series was directed by Kim Ah Young and produced by WhyNot Media. With eight episodes of approximately 18 minutes each, the production explores themes of youth, romance, and sports, with basketball serving as a central backdrop.

== Broadcast ==
A Breeze of Love premiered on November 10, 2023, with all eight episodes released directly on iQIYI.

== Reception ==
A Breeze of Love received attention from South Korean and international media. On MyDramaList, the series holds a rating of 8.2/10 from more than 1,400 users. Buzzfeed included the drama in a list of recommended series for fans of romantic rivalries, Abstractaf described it as a light and enjoyable romance, and Sports Khan highlighted basketball as a metaphor for the emotional struggles of the protagonists.
