= Kim So-hyeong =

South Korean voice actor

- Hangul: 김소형
- RR: Gim Sohyeong
- MR: Kim Sohyŏng

Kim So-hyeong is a South Korean voice actor who joined Seoul-based Korean Broadcasting System's voice acting division in 1992.

== Role ==
=== Broadcast TV ===
- Alien Nine (Korea TV Edition, Tooniverse)
- Aria (Korea TV Edition, Animax)
- Chibi Maruko-chan (Korea TV Edition, Tooniverse)
- Dragon Ball Z (Korea TV Edition, KBS)
- Dragon Ball GT (Korea TV Edition, KBS)
- Fighting Spirit (Korea TV Edition, Tooniverse)
- Mask Man (Original Korean TV series, KBS)
- One Piece (Korea TV Edition, Animax)
- Romeo's Blue Skies (Korea TV Edition, KBS)
- Slam Dunk (Korea TV Edition, SBS)
- The Irresponsible Captain Tylor (Korea TV Edition, Tooniverse)
- Wedding Peach (Korea TV Edition, SBS)

=== Film dubbing ===
- The Land Before Time film series (Korea TV Edition, SBS) (Spike)
- Iron Man (Korea TV Edition, KBS) (Replacing Terrence Howard)
- Crash (Korea TV Edition, KBS) (Replacing Terrence Howard)
- Comrades: Almost a Love Story (Korea TV Edition, KBS) (Replacing Eric Tsang)
- Infernal Affairs film series (Korea TV Edition, KBS) (Replacing Eric Tsang)
- Cats & Dogs (Korea TV Edition, SBS) (Replacing Sean Hayes)
- Dracula 2000 (Korea TV Edition, KBS) (Replacing Omar Epps)
- Dreamer (Korea TV Edition, KBS) (replacing Ken Howard)
- Kung Fu Hustle (Korea TV Edition, KBS)
- A Chinese Ghost Story II (Korea TV Edition, SBS)
- Perhaps Love (Korea TV Edition, KBS)
- Stuart Little (Korea TV Edition, KBS)

=== Video games ===
- Halo 2 - Chief Tartarus
- StarCraft II: Wings of Liberty - Bailiff
