= Kim Geon-won =

South Korean actor

- Born: Kim Geon-won; 1 January 1990 (age 36); South Korea
- Other names: Kim Gun-won, Kim Gon-won
- Occupations: Actor; model
- Years active: 2017–present

Kim Geon-won is a South Korean actor and model. He is best known for his lead roles in dramas such as Ending Again and Growing Season Special, Ending Again Special.

== Filmography ==
=== Television series ===
Year	Title	Role	Ref.
2020	Ending Again	Do Yoon-soo	
2020	Growing Season Special	Do Yoon-soo	
2020	Ending Again Special	Do Yoon-soo	

=== Film ===
Year	Title	Role	Ref.
2017	Samseon-dong , Laundry	Ji-hoon	
2018	The Four Vampires	Jae-hyeon	
2021	Fingers After	Student	
2021	The Confidential Coffee Brake	Student from fingers after	

=== Music video appearances ===
Year	Title	Artist	Ref.
2019	Yacht	전기뱀장어 (The Electriceels)	
2022	러브 인 발코니 (love in balcony)	87dance	
