= Olympus Guardian =

2002 South Korean tv show and 2005 film

- 올림포스 가디언
- Written by: Jeon Hye-yeong
- Directed by: Lee Ki-seok, Park Byung-soon
- Country of origin: South Korea
- Original language: Korean

Production
- Running time: 20 minutes
- Production companies: SBS, SBS Productions, SBSi, Gana Entertainment, Dong Woo Animation

Olympus Guardian (Korean: 올림포스 가디언) is a South Korean animated television series based on "The Greek and Roman Myths in Comics" (a total of 20 volumes) published by Gana Publishing Co., a publishing company specializing in comics. From 11 December 2002 to 30 July 2003, it was made into an animated film by SBS, SBS Productions, SBSi, Gana Entertainment and Dongwoo Animation and aired on SBS. It tells the story of Ji-woo and Ji-yeon listening to Greek and Roman mythology from their father, who works as a painter.

In 2005, the movie version of the animated film "Olympus Guardian: Gigantes Counterattack" was screened. RH Korea has released its full collection of Olympus Guardian (a total of 70 volumes) based on the cartoon through Random Kids, a children's specialty brand.

== Animated television series ==
Olympus Guardian
- 올림포스 가디언
- Written by: Jeon Hye-yeong
- Directed by: Lee Ki-seok, Park Byung-soon
- Country of origin: South Korea
- No. of episodes: 39

Production
- Producer: Cho Hong-jun
- Running time: 20 minutes
- Production companies: SBS, SBS Productions, SBSi, Gana Entertainment, Dong Woo Animation

Original release
- Network: SBS
- Release: December 11, 2002 – July 30, 2003

=== Plot ===
Ji-woo and Ji-yeon enter the studio of their father, who works as a painter, and become curious as they discover a book of Greek and Roman mythology on a desk. Ji-woo and Ji-yeon hear the story of Greek and Roman mythology from their father, and the animation starts with the stories of the Olympus gods.

Cronus fears that his sons will be deprived of their status, and swallows them as soon as they are born. However, Cronos' wife, Rhea, did not want her youngest son, Zeus, to be stolen by her cruel husband, Cronus, so he secretly swallows stones and Zeus the baby escapes to a safe place for the maid.

As time goes on, Zeus becomes an adult and hears the story of his birth from the tree spirit, Dryad. This led Zeus to find a herb that induces vomiting to save his brothers and sisters that Cronus swallowed, and goes to the dark-covered Temple of Olympus.

Zeus, who went to the Temple of Olympus, turned to his mother, Rhea, for help. Rhea feeds Cronus with herbs that induce vomiting. With Rhea's help, Zeus's brothers and sisters, who escaped from Cronus' body, defeated Cronus and rescued the Temple of Olympus.

=== Characters and voice actors ===
==== Twelve Olympians ====
Zeus (Voice actor: Hong Si-ho (episode 1–14, 16–39), Jang Gwang (episode 15)): The supreme god with a style to live on form and die for form. He uses all the postures that boast a golden angle so that he can use the perfect pose anytime, anywhere with the camera on. The posture alone is charismatic enough to overwhelm other gods, but it can always collapse once. The action is agile, and it is characterized by the tension and tight posture that you can feel from a game character or a kung fu master. The first movement of the action always shows a strong-weak-weak movement.

Hera (Voice actor: Kang Hee-sun): The supreme goddess who always reigns supremely with an ambience that looks down on people. She has a body and posture that is not disturbed by tension, and has a sharp gaze and a feeling that penetrates Zeus's flirtation. When her eyes flash with poison, the ratio of the whites of the eyes to the pupils becomes 7:3. She protects her family as the goddess of marriage. To those who value her family, she feels even softer and more sacred.

Poseidon (Voice actor: Ahn Jong-duk (episode 1, 2), Kim Kwan-jin (episode 3–6, 10, 32–39), and Shin Sung-ho (episode 7, 13–25)): The god of sea with lively laughter, strong power, simple thoughts, and a thick mountain-like body. He gets the most power with the least amount of movement. He has only a chance power, his head is simple, and he can be covered by the waves he has created. Still, he doesn't budge and his eyes are wide open. He acts as soon as he believes "this is it!", But his ears are thin and he is shaken by this word. On the contrary, when the head becomes complicated, it immediately causes a windmill wave (Poseidon is a technique that makes swirling waves surge by swinging the trident in a circular shape like a compass, with Poseidon as its axis).

Hades (Voice actor: Kim Seung-tae (episode 1), Hong Seung-sup (episode 2–5), Gu Ja-hyung (episode 22), and Kim Woo-jeong (episode 35)): The god of the underworld, characterized by a poker face that doesn't know what he's thinking. He subdues the crowd with his gloomy eyes, tightly closed lips, a wide-open body, and a loud voice. He has a dark charisma that is the exact opposite of Zeus, but he also has a sensibility to enjoy reciting poetry. He enjoys sunbathing in the sunlight coming through the crevices of the dark underground palace. The way he confesses his love with his gloomy eyes is the sexiest among the male gods.

Apollo (Voice actor: Uhm Tae-kuk (episode 2), Son Won-il (episode 3–7, 10–14, 17–39), Kim Seung-joon (episode 8), and Yoon Bok-sung (episode 15)): The god of music, prophecy, and the sun. Among the twelve gods of Olympus, he is the most handsome and handsome, and he is a wonderful god who is absolutely supported by most women. She carries a lyre, she likes to play music and shoots her bow well. He bangs his golden hair with a head bang, and the girls tend to fall for the sparkling teeth between his smiling lips. With a radiant ambience like the image of the sun, she is full of confidence and vitality, and she speaks pleasantly. He speaks and acts while keeping the way of moderation, but when someone goes against him or harms his self-esteem, he gets furious and always makes a mess around him. In particular, when someone touches one's self-esteem, actions speak louder than words, as if under hypnosis, and sometimes regret after committing such an action.

Artemis (Voice actor: Kim Hye-mi (episode 2) and Woo Jung-shin (episode 26–39)): The goddess of hunting and the moon. She is full of health and agility, so she does not tend to sit still for long periods of time in one place. She thinks and makes decisions quickly and takes action quickly. She's pure and stubborn, but she's quick to admit when she's wrong. She is a hot-tempered woman who cries and beats her when she is upset, but she is the most girly among goddesses.

Athena (Voice actor: Cha Myung-hwa (episode 2–7, 11–17, 39), Woo Jung-shin (episode 10), and Lee Mi-ja (episode 32–35)): The goddess of invincible wisdom and war. She is usually reticent, but she is a goddess of trust and presence, enough to make other gods nervous and focused with every word she speaks. She always talks about the core and the essentials, and even when joking, she's usually in a serious mood. She has a small range of facial expressions and has a tough ambience, so she has a lot of female fans. Once she gets angry, she destroys her surroundings.

Hermes (Voice actor: Kim Young-sun): The god of travelers, shepherds, merchants and thieves. It is characterized by a mischievous smile that makes you feel various tricks running around in his head. Among the twelve gods of Olympus, he is the fastest and busiest deity who can do the most work. He is a close-knit person who is always polite and respectful to other gods. He is so sociable that anyone who sees Hermes will like it, and speaks with divine dignity to humans.

Aphrodite (Voice actor: Choi Duk-hee (episode 4–8, 10), Kim Jeong-ju (episode 9), and Ji Mi-ae (episode 22–39)): The goddess of love and beauty. Her perfect body of 34-24-36, sculptural white skin and rich blonde hair are her charm points. She usually silently lowers her eyes by half and boasts an elegant beauty. She is a goddess who always keeps the eyes of people, especially men, and once she straightens her eyes, all men pass on her fascinating eyes. She has both elegance and sensual beauty, and all her actions and expressions are loose. She speaks slowly, applauds, and fascinates. When she gets angry, she stirs her hair and her gaze looks cool, and she turns into a cold and cool ambience.

Hephaestus (Voice actor: Kim Kwan-jin): The god of blacksmith who always makes things in his own studio. He is the dullest and ugliest of the twelve gods of Olympus. He is lame and has bad back and knee joints because he works while sitting. However, he tends to focus on making people with a good laugh. He has excellent dexterity and is meticulous and perfect in producing results, so he has a good brain.

Ares (Voice actor: Hong Seung-sup (episode 3, 4), Jung Seung-wook (episode 17), and Ahn Jong-deok (episode 23)): The god of war who is always armed and roams the battlefield. He lives on the battlefield, so his armor is always dirty. He refuses to get close to other gods because of his tousled hair and beastly eyes. He looks like he's up for a fight, as he always has a squirming personality with his body forward. He gives strength to his words and speaks clearly, but the content is always simple, and "Let's fight!" and "Let's get rid of it!" are the main points of the conversation. He blushes in front of Aphrodite, but he does the same thing, only his face blushes. When his anger reaches the end of his head, he can't speak and slaps around, saying, "Oh, no!".

Demeter (Voice actor: Lee Mi-ja): The goddess of earth and grain. It has a warm feeling from the body and face. She always has a gentle and kind smile, but she is timid and often leads to discouragement. When sadness becomes too frantic, a strong antagonism that dries up everything around is released. Because of her mad eyes, where she can only see one thing she wants, everyone around her becomes intimidated and can't even approach her. She is also nervous when Demeter is angry with other gods, but she is the only one who gets really mad when she is acknowledged as angry.

==== Storyteller ====
Father of Ji-woo and Ji-yeon (Voice actor: Lee Bong-jun): He is a painter in his early 40s and features a caring, smiling face. Ji-woo and Ji-yeon are children they value, but they try to correct family fights, stealing and lying. He is a scary father when he is angry, but he is also a weak father who is heartbroken in a dark place when he is angry.

Ji-woo (Voice actor: Lee Mi-ja): A boy in the fifth grade of elementary school who has a fast brain and a lot of playfulness. He has a strong sense of skepticism, but he makes compromises realistically in the face of the danger he faces. But when someone else is in an injustice situation, they try to help out. He's not very good at sports, but he's also the type of person who moves with strength he didn't have if he had a cause. He has a bit of a show-off, so he calls himself a genius, but in fact he practices when no one is there. He often scolds his younger sister, Ji-yeon, but in fact he is doing it for his own sister, so he sometimes does moving things. In his moments of crisis, he also has dignity and responsibility, as he acts to protect his younger sister.

Ji-yeon (Voice actor: Woo Jung-shin): A cute and adorable girl in the second grade of elementary school. Her recent interest is love and she is very concerned about her appearance. She always carries a mirror and calls it "Mirror Princess". She is so fast in daydreaming that she is often dazed. She has a temperament when someone else has a prettier hair style than herself or has a pretty thing, and she hates it when others imitate her, so she throws it off when she's wearing the same clothes. She is so attached to and proud of the things she once bought. When she sees something disgusting like a bug, she screams, but when she sees a scary monster, she has no sense of reality and is rather dull.

=== Episodes ===
Dates in parentheses indicate the date the episode was first aired.

- Episode 1: Gods of Olympus (올림포스의 신들, Airdate: 11 December 2002)
- Episode 2: Fire of Prometheus (프로메테우스의 불, Airdate: 12 December 2002)
- Episode 3: Pandora's Box (판도라의 상자, Airdate: 18 December 2002)
- Episode 4: Love and Soul - Part I (사랑과 영혼 1부, Airdate: 25 December 2002)
- Episode 5: Love and Soul - Part II (사랑과 영혼 2부, Airdate: 26 December 2002)
- Episode 6: Who is the Most Beautiful Goddess? (가장 아름다운 여신은?, Airdate: 2 January 2003)
- Episode 7: Athena and Arachne (아테나와 아라크네, Airdate: 8 January 2003)
- Episode 8: Story of Hermes (헤르메스 이야기, Airdate: 9 January 2003)
- Episode 9: Story of Atalanta (아탈란테 이야기, Airdate: 15 January 2003)
- Episode 10: Daphne turned into a laurel (월계수가 된 다프네, Airdate: 16 January 2003)
- Episode 11: Baucis and Philemon (바우키스와 필레몬, Airdate: 22 January 2003)
- Episode 12: Bellerophon and Pegasus (벨레로폰과 페가수스, Airdate: 23 January 2003)
- Episode 13: Adventures of Perseus - Part I (페르세우스의 모험 1부, Airdate: 29 January 2003)
- Episode 14: Adventures of Perseus - Part II (페르세우스의 모험 2부, Airdate: 30 January 2003)
- Episode 15: Wings of Icarus (이카로스의 날개, Airdate: 5 February 2003)
- Episode 16: Zeus and Io (제우스와 이오, Airdate: 6 February 2003)
- Episode 17: Cadmus and Dragon of Ares (카드모스와 아레스의 용, Airdate: 12 February 2003)
- Episode 18: Echo and Narcissus (에코와 나르키소스, Airdate: 19 February 2003)
- Episode 19: Midas, Hand of Gold (황금의 손 미다스, Airdate: 26 February 2003)
- Episode 20: Phrixus and Helle (프릭소스와 헬레, Airdate: 5 March 2003)
- Episode 21: Orpheus and Eurydice (오르페우스와 에우리디케, Airdate: 12 March 2003)
- Episode 22: Love of Hades (하이데스의 사랑, Airdate: 19 March 2003)
- Episode 23: Birth of Hercules (영웅 헤라클레스의 탄생, Airdate: 26 March 2003)
- Episode 24: Twelve Labours of Hercules (영웅 헤라클레스의 12가지 과업, Airdate: 2 April 2003)
- Episode 25: Resurrection of Hercules (영웅 헤라클레스의 부활, Airdate: 9 April 2003)
- Episode 26: Love of Artemis (아르테미스의 사랑, Airdate: 23 April 2003)
- Episode 27: Argonauts - 50 Heroes (아르고 원정대 50인의 영웅, Airdate: 30 April 2003)
- Episode 28: Argonauts - Finding the Golden Sheep (아르고 원정대 황금 양털을 찾아서, Airdate: 7 May 2003)
- Episode 29: Theseus and Minotaurus (테세우스와 미노타우로스, Airdate: 14 May 2003)
- Episode 30: Paeton's Golden chariot (파에톤의 황금마차, Airdate: 21 May 2003)
- Episode 31: Adventures of Odysseus - Part I (오딧세우스의 모험 1부, Airdate: 28 May 2003)
- Episode 32: Adventures of Odysseus - Part II (오딧세우스의 모험 2부, Airdate: 4 June 2003)
- Episode 33: Adventures of Odysseus - Part III (오딧세우스의 모험 3부, Airdate: 11 June 2003)
- Episode 34: The Story of Achilles (아킬레우스 이야기, Airdate: 18 June 2003)
- Episode 35: Trojan Horse (트로이 목마, Airdate: 2 July 2003)
- Episode 36: Eos and Tithonus (에오스와 티토노스, Airdate: 9 July 2003)
- Episode 37: An unspoken story - Flowers (못다한 이야기 - 꽃, Airdate: 16 July 2003)
- Episode 38: An unspoken story - Monster (못다한 이야기 - 괴수, Airdate: 23 July 2003)
- Episode 39: An unspoken story - Constellation (못다한 이야기 - 별자리, Airdate: 30 July 2003)

== Films ==
Olympus Guardian
- Hangul: 그리스 로마 신화 - 올림포스 가디언 - 기간테스 대역습
- RR: Geuriseu roma sinhwa - ollimposeu gadieon - giganteseu daeyeokseup
- MR: Kŭrisŭ roma sinhwa - ollimp'osŭ kadiŏn - kigant'esŭ taeyŏksŭp
- Directed by: Kim Joon
- Written by: Jun Hye-Young
- Cinematography: Shin Hyo-Chul
- Edited by: Kyung Min-ho
- Music by: Shin Myung-Soo; Lee Han-Na
- Production company: G&G Entertainment
- Release date: July 28, 2005
- Running time: 87 minutes
- Country: South Korea
- Language: Korean

Olympus Guardians: Gigantes Counterattack is a 2005 South Korean animated movie based on Greek mythology.

=== Voice cast ===
- Oh Seung-Yoon as Triton
- Woo Jung-Shin as Cardia
- Lee Jung-Goo as Eurymedon
- Jung Mi-Sook as Herma
- Jang Gwang as Zeus
- Kang Hee-Sun as Hera
- Yoon So-Ra as Athena
- Seol Young-Bum as Hades
- Hong Sung-Hun as Poseidon
- Yoon Sung-Hye as Amphitrite
- Bae Jung-Mi as Artemis
- Son Won-Il as Apollo
- Lee Chul-Yong as Ares
- Kim Young-Sun as Hermes
- Lee Ja-Young as Sid
- Lee Jung-Hyun as Fur seal
- Lee Han-Na as Cardia's mother

== Differences between myths and stories ==
- In the myth, Deucalion and Pyrrha created humans with the help of Themis, but in the aeni, humans are created with the help of hope from Pandora's box.
- In the myth, Arachne feels ashamed of being hated by Athena and commits suicide by hanging herself, but in the aeni, she is struck by lightning thrown by Zeus and dies.
- Hades kidnaps Persephone by force in myths, but Hades persuades Persephone to take her to the underworld in the aeni.
- In myths, the man who lost Atalante was executed in a marathon race to claim Atalante, but he was exiled to a deserted island in the aeni.
- In the myths, Achilles kills Hector with his spear, but he instead pushes him off the ravine during their duel.

== See also ==
- Aeni
