= Jo Ye-sin =

Korean voice actor (born 1970)

Jo Ye Sin (Korean: 조예신; born 1970) is a Korean voice actor.

She joined the Munhwa Broadcasting Corporation's voice acting division in 1993.

== Roles ==
=== Broadcast TV ===
- Chokomi (MBC)
- Miracle Girls (Korea TV Edition, MBC)

=== Film dubbing ===
- The Mask of Zorro (replacing Catherine Zeta-Jones, Korea TV Edition, MBC)
- Terminator (replacing Linda Hamilton, Korea TV Edition, MBC)

== See also ==
- Munhwa Broadcasting Corporation
- MBC Voice Acting Division

== Homepage ==
- MBC Voice Acting Division Jo Ye Sin Blog(in Korean)
