= Kim Young-sik =

South Korean actor

- Hangul: 김영식
- RR: Gim Yeongsik
- MR: Kim Yŏngsik

Kim Young-sik (born 1953) is a Seoul engraver of Oriental seals who impersonates North Korean leader Kim Jong-il. Ever since his sister-in-law teased the businessman's sagging form as a likeness to the chairman, Kim Young-sik has portrayed Kim Jong-il at every opportunity, in movies, television shows, commercials, and for personal appearances. "When someone tells me I don't resemble Kim Jong-il in certain respects, I'm unhappy," said Kim in The Korea Times. Unlike his more cosmetically enhanced competitor Bae Eun-sik, "I am a natural," Kim told the Los Angeles Times. "I didn't have to perm my hair. I didn't need plastic surgery. Even my family name, Kim, didn't have to be changed. Sometimes I feel like I am Kim Jong-il." Kim, whose stated goal is to have the leader say, "Little Brother, come and see me," affirms, "I wouldn't want Kim Jong-il to be offended by anything I do. I don't want to portray him as an evil person."
