= Song Kwang-won =

South Korean actor

- Born: Song Kwang-won; September 22, 1987 (age 39); Seoul, South Korea
- Education: Korea University - Communucation
- Occupation: Actor
- Years active: 2008–present

Korean name
- Hangul: 송광원
- RR: Song Gwangwon
- MR: Song Kwangwŏn

Song Kwang-won (born Song Kwang-won; September 22, 1987) is a South Korean actor. Song began his career in musical theatre, notably in Ride Away (2008), The Front Line (2011), Black Mary Poppins (2012), and Blue Top returns (2012).

== Life ==
Song lived in Canada as a child, and is a permanent resident of the country.

== Filmography ==
=== Television series ===
Year	Title	Role	Network
2013–14	Blue Top Returns 3	Song Kwang-won	tvN

=== Film ===
Year	Title	Role
2008	Ride Away	Lim Seong-hui (Ha-Jung's brother)
2011	The Front Line	rifle soldier

== Theater ==
Year	Title	Role
2010	Cats on the Roof - Dahakro	Lee Kyong-min
2012	Romantic Comedy	In-ho
2012–2013	Cats on the Roof - Kangnam	Lee Kyong-min
2013	Cats on the Roof - Ulsan	Lee Kyong-min
2014–2015	Rules of Dating - Dahakro	Choi Ji-seong
