= Shin Jeong-you =

South Korean actor, singer and dancer (born 1997)

- 신정유
- Born: 23 March 1997 (age 29); South Korea
- Other names: Shin Jeong-yu, Shin Jung-yoo, Jeongyu
- Occupations: Actor; singer; dancer
- Years active: 2018–present
- Agent: Stardium Entertainment
- Known for: A Breeze of Love (2023); Always Meet Again (2026)
- Musical career
- Genre: K-pop
- Instrument: Vocals
- Formerly of: The Man Blk
- Website: main-stardium.com

Shin Jeong-you (Korean: 신정유; born 23 March 1997), also known as Jeong Yu (정유), is a South Korean actor, singer and dancer. He is known for starring in several television series and web dramas, including Wish Woosh 2 (2019), Triple Fling (2019), A Breeze of Love (2023), Romance Is Comedy (2024) and Always Meet Again (2026).

== Career ==
Shin Jeong-you began his career in 2018 as an actor in web dramas, debuting in Govengers. In 2019, he gained recognition playing Jung Da-hyun in Triple Fling and its sequel Triple Fling Season 2. In the same year, he starred in Wish Woosh 2 as Lee Min-woong.

In 2023, he starred in A Breeze of Love as Ban Dong-uk, a role that brought him international recognition and was cited by outlets such as Buzzfeed and Sports Khan. In 2024, he played Min Ji-hyeok in Romance Is Comedy, and in 2026 took the lead role of Lee U-jin in Always Meet Again, a BL production that received wide media coverage.

Besides acting, Shin is also a singer and member of the group The Man Blk, formed in 2018, where he serves as lead vocalist.

== Filmography ==
=== Television series ===
Year	Title	Role	Notes/Ref.
2026	Always Meet Again	Lead	Lee U Jin
2024	Romance Is Comedy	Ji Hyeok Min	Lead
2023	A Breeze of Love	Ban Dong Uk	Lead
2019–2020	Wish Woosh 2	Lee Min Woong	Lead
2019	Triple Fling Season 2	Jung Da Hyun	Supporting
2019	Triple Fling	Jung Da Hyun	Lead
2018	Govengers	Shin Jeong Yu	Lead

=== Variety shows ===
Year	Title	Notes
2018	Nonhyeon Stardium	Guest

=== Advertisements ===
Year	Title	Notes
2019	BBQ Chicken	Commercial
2018	LG U+ 5G	Commercial

== Discography ==
=== Extended plays ===
Year	Title	Notes
2018	Various Colors	with The Man Blk
