= Oh Sung-won =

Oh Sung-Won (Korean: 오성원; born October 22, 1972) is a South Korean musical theatre actor and crossover pop singer.

== Career ==
Oh graduated from the Department of Vocal Music at Chung-Ang University. He also graduated from Dankook University Graduate School of Arts with a master's degree in Musical Theater and Dankook University Graduate School of Education with a master's degree in Music Education.

He has been active in musical theatre since 1999 in productions of Elisabeth, Rudolf, Jekyll & Hyde, The Last Empress and 42nd Street. He taught at Hanlim Multi Art High School as the musical theatre department's chairman beginning in 2011. He supported Africa Dance/Theatre Academy as the volunteer representative.
