= Son Won-il (voice actor) =

South Korean voice actor (born 1962)

Son Won-il (Korean: 손원일; born August 10, 1962) is a South Korean voice actor who joined the Munhwa Broadcasting Corporation's Voice Acting Division in 1985.

== Roles ==
=== Broadcasting TV ===
- 24 (replacing Thomas Kretschmann by Season 2, Korea TV Edition, MBC)
- CSI: Crime Scene Investigation (replacing Alex Carter, Korea TV Edition, MBC)
- Cardcaptor Sakura (Korea TV Edition, SBS)
- Naruto (Korea TV Edition, Tooniverse) - Kakashi Hatake
