= List of programs broadcast by MBC TV =

This is a list of programs broadcast on South Korean terrestrial television network MBC TV.

== Dramas ==
MBC primetime flagship dramas are broadcast at 21:55 until the scheduling changes in April 2019, which broadcast was changed to 20:55, with each series airing on two consecutive nights: Mondays and Tuesdays, Wednesdays and Thursdays, and Saturdays.

=== Monday–Tuesday ===
==== 1980s ====
Year	English title	Korean title
1980–1981	A Hundred Year Old Guest	백년손님
1981–1982	Jang Hee-bin	장희빈
1982	Lee Seung-hoon of the Nam River	남강 이승훈
1982	Millionaire Princess Kim Gap-soon	공주갑부 김갑순
1982	Baeksan Ahn Hee-jae	백산 안희제
1982	Lee Yong-ik	이용익
1983	King of Trade Choi Bong-joon	무역왕 최봉준
1983	25 Hours of Ambition	야망의 25시
1983	Tomorrow's Sun	내일은 태양
1983	Deep Rooted Tree	뿌리깊은 나무
1984	The Ume Tree in the Midst of the Snow	설중매
1985	The Wind Orchid	풍란
1985	The Imjin War	임진왜란
1986	The Hoechun Gate	회천문
1986	Namhan Mountain Castle	남한산성
1987	Firebird	불새
1987	Hooray	야호
1987	Bucho	부초
1987	Tomorrow After Tomorrow	내일 또 내일
1987	The Last Witness	최후의 증인
1987	Sanha (TV series)	산하
1987	A Beautiful Secret Love Affair	아름다운 밀회
1987	Forbidden Land	갈 수 없는 나라
1987	A Retired Front	퇴역전선
1987	Temptation	유혹
1987	A Life Story	인생화보
1987	My Daughter	딸아
1988	Teacher, Our Teacher	선생님 우리 선생님
1988	People of Wonmi-dong	원미동 사람들
1988	We Don't Know That Either	그것은 우리도 모른다
1988	The Street Musician	거리의 악사
1988	Human Market	인간시장
1988	If Tomorrow Comes	내일이 오면
1988	The Last Idol	마지막 우상
1988	Supreme Prosecutors' Office	대검자
1988	Sandcastle	모래성
1988	Our Town	우리 읍내
1988	A Bad Year For The City	도시의 흉년
1989	Winter Mist	겨울 안개
1989	Bird Migration	철새
1989	For the Emperor)	황제를 위하여
1989	A Restless Tree	잠들지 않는 나무
1989	Butterfly, Let's Go Settle	나비야 청산가자
1989	Wound)	상처
1989	The Fifth Row	제5열
1989	The Great Battle	대도전
1989	An Angel's Choice (1989 TV series)	천사의 선택
1989	Armband	완장
1989	Giant)	거인

==== 1990s ====
Year	English title	Korean title
1990	The House with a Deep Yard	마당 깊은 집
1990	What Women Want	여자는 무엇으로 사는가
1990	A Perfect Love	완전한 사랑
1990	Ddombanggakha	똠방각하
1990	Dark Sky, Dark Bird	어둔 하늘 어둔 새
1990	The Dancing Gayageum	춤추는 가얏고
1990	Fun World	재미있는 세상
1991	Winter Story	겨울 이야기
1991	Palace)	고궁
1991	The Beginning of a Farewell	이별의 시작
1991	Rosy Life	장미빛 인생
1991	Happy Language Dictionary	행복어사전
1991	My Heart is a Lake	내 마음은 호수
1991	Dongui Bogam)	동의보감
1992	A Promise	약속
1992	Haengchon Apartments	행촌 아파트
1992	Kingdom of Wrath	분노의 왕국
1992	Jealousy	질투
1992	4 Days Love	4일 간의 사랑
1992	Two Women	두 여자
1992	The Sun Shines Out the Window	창밖에는 태양이 빛났다
1992	Wind in the Grass	억새 바람
1993	Walking all the way to heaven	걸어서 하늘까
1993	Way of Love	사랑의 방식
1993	Mountain Wind	산바람
1993	I Am Not An Angel	나는 천사가 아니다
1993	Iljimae	일지매
1993	Pilot	파일럿
1993	Woman's Man	여자의 남자
1994	The Last Match	마지막 승부
1994	Majso	맞수
1994	Bird, Bird, Blue Bird	새야 새야 파랑새야
1994	Adam's City	아담의 도시
1994	Love in Your Bosom	사랑을 그대 품안에
1994	M	M
1994	Challenge	도전
1994	Last Lover	마지막 연인
1994	Giant's Hand (거인의 손	
1994	Song of a Blind Bird	눈먼 새의 노래
1994	Koreiski	까레이스키
1995	Hotel	호텔
1995	Do You Remember Love?	사랑을 기억하세요
1995	TV City	TV시티
1995	Spider	거미
1995	Woman	여
1995	Basics of Love	연애의 기초
1996	Star	별
1996	Their Embrace	그들의 포옹
1996	1.5	1.5
1996	Sickle	낫
1996	Icing	아이싱
1996	Lover	애인
1996	Splendid Holiday	화려한 휴가
1996	The Most Beautiful Goodbye in the World	세상에서 가장 아름다운 이별
1996	Seven Spoons	일곱개의 숟가락
1997	Golden Feather	황금 깃털
1997	Medical Brothers	의가형제
1997	Star in My Heart	별은 내가슴에
1997	Fireworks	불꽃
1999	Springtime	청춘
1999	The Boss	왕초
1999	Last War	마지막 전쟁
1999	Kook Hee	국희
1999–2000	Hur Jun	허준

==== 2000s ====
Year	English title	Korean title
2000	Some Like It Hot	뜨거운 것이 좋아
2000–2001	Housewife's Rebellion	아줌마
2001	Hong Guk Young	홍국영
2001	Sun Hee and Jin Hee	선희진희
2001–2002	The Merchant	상도
2002	Man in Crisis	위기의 남자
2002	Confession	고백
2002	My Love Patzzi	내 사랑 팥쥐
2002–2003	Inspector Park Mun-su	어사 박문수
2003	Love Letter	러브레터
2003	The Bean Chaff of My Life	내 인생의 콩깍지
2003	Cats on the Roof	옥탑방 고양이
2003	Damo	다모
2003	Jewel in the Palace	대장금
2004	Phoenix	불새
2004–2005	The Age of Heroes	영웅시대
2005	Wonderful Life	원더풀 라이프
2005	Smile of Spring Day	봄날의 미소
2005	Next	환생-넥스트
2005	Lawyers	변호사들
2005	The Secret Lovers	비밀남녀
2005–2006	Sweet Spy	달콤한 스파이
2006	Wolf	늑대
2006	Special of my Life	내 인생의 스페셜
2006	Which Star Are You From	넌 어느 별에서 왔니
2007	Jumong	주몽
2007	H.I.T	히트
2007	Good Wife	신 현모양처
2007	Coffee Prince	커피프린스 1호점
2007	Legend of Hyang Dan	향단전
2007–2008	Lee San, Wind of the Palace	이산
2008	Night is Night	밤이면 밤마다
2008–2009	East of Eden	에덴의 동쪽
2009	Queen of Housewives	내조의 여왕
2009	Queen Seondeok	선덕여왕

==== 2010s ====
Year	English title	Korean title
2010	Welcome 2 Life	웰컴2라이프
2010	Pasta	파스타
2010	Dong Yi	동이
2010	Queen of Reversals	역전의 여왕
2011	The Duo	짝패
2011	Miss Ripley	굿바이 미스 리플리
2011	Gyebaek	계백
2011–2012	Lights and Shadows	빛과 그림자
2012	Golden Time	골든타임
2012–2013	The King's Doctor	마의
2013	Gu Family Book	구가의서
2013	Goddess of Fire	불의 여신 정이
2013–2014	Empress Ki	기황후
2014	Triangle	트라이앵글
2014	Diary of a Night Watchman	야경꾼 일지
2014	Pride and Prejudice	오만과 편견
2015	Shine or Go Crazy	빛나거나 미치거나
2015	Splendid Politics	화정
2015–2016	Glamorous Temptation	화려한 유혹
2016	Monster	몬스터
2016	Woman with a Suitcase	캐리어를 끄는 여자
2016–2017	Night Light	불야성
2017	The Rebel	역적: 백성을 훔친 도적
2017	The Guardians	파수꾼
2017	The King in Love	왕은 사랑한다
2017	Children of the 20th Century	20세기 소년소녀
2017–2018	Two Cops	투깝스
2018	Tempted	위대한 유혹자
2018	You Drive Me Crazy	미치겠다, 너땜에
2018	Partners for Justice	검법남녀
2018	Risky Romance	사생결단 로맨스
2018	Bad Papa	배드파파
2018–2019	Less Than Evil	나쁜 형사
2019	Item	아이템
2019	Special Labor Inspector	특별근로감독관 조장풍
2019	Partners for Justice 2	검법남녀 2

==== 2020s ====
Year	English title	Korean title
2020	Find Me in Your Memory	그 남자의 기억법
2020	365: Repeat the Year	365: 운명을 거스르는 1년
2020	Dinner Mate	저녁 같이 드실래요?
2020	Lonely Enough to Love	연애는 귀찮지만 외로운 건 싫어!
2020	Kairos	카이로스

==== Monday (22:30) ====
- Hunted (멧돼지 사냥; 2022)

==== Monday (22:50) ====
- Love Scene Number (러브씬넘버#; 2021)

=== Wednesday–Thursday ===
==== 1990s ====
Year	English title	Korean title
1991–1992	Eyes of Dawn	여명의 눈동자
1998	Sunflower	해바라기
1999	Did We Really Love?	우리가 정말 사랑했을까
1999	Goodbye My Love	안녕 내사랑
1999	Into the Sunlight	햇빛속으로

==== 2000s ====
Year	English title	Korean title
2000	Truth	진실
2000	Bad Boys	나쁜 친구들
2000	All About Eve	이브의 모든 것
2000	Mr. Duke	신귀공자
2000	Secret	비밀
2000–2001	Golden Era	황금시대
2001	Delicious Proposal	맛있는 청혼
2001	Hotelier	호텔리어
2001	Four Sisters	네 자매 이야기
2001	Sweet Bear	반달곰 내사랑
2001	Man of Autumn	가을에 만난 남자
2001	Picnic	소풍
2002	Sunshine	그햇살이 나에게
2002	Present	선물
2002	Romance	로망스
2002	Ruler of Your Own World	네 멋대로 해라
2002	Remember	리멤버
2002–2003	Trio	삼총사
2003	Snowman	눈사람
2003	Country Princess	위풍당당 그녀
2003	Scent of a Man	남자의 향기
2003	Women Next Door	앞집 여자
2003	Good Person	좋은 사람
2003	Breathless	나는 달린다
2003	Desert Spring	사막의 샘
2003	Argon	아르곤
2004	Match Made in Heaven	천생연분
2004	Say You Love Me	사랑한다 말해줘
2004	The Woman Who Wants to Marry	결혼하고 싶은 여자
2004	First Love of a Royal Prince	황태자의 첫사랑
2004	Ireland	아일랜드
2004	Tropical Nights in December	12월의 열대야
2005	Sad Love Story	슬픈연가
2005	Super Rookie	신입사원
2005	My Lovely Sam Soon	내 이름은 김삼순
2005	Our Attitude to Prepare Parting	이별에 대처하는 우리의 자세
2005	Autumn Shower	가을 소나기
2005–2006	Young Jae Golden Days	영재의 전성시대
2006	Princess Hours	궁
2006	Dr. Kkang	닥터 깽
2006	One Fine Day	어느 멋진 날
2006	Over the Rainbow	오버 더 레인보우
2006	What's Up Fox	여우야 뭐하니
2006–2007	90 Days, Time to Love	90일, 사랑할 시간
2007	Prince Hours	궁S
2007	Thank You	고맙습니다
2007	Merry Mary	메리대구 공방전
2007	Ground Zero	그라운드 제로
2007	Time Between Dog and Wolf	개와 늑대의 시간
2007	The Legend	태왕사신기
2007–2008	New Heart	뉴하트
2008	Who Are You?	누구세요?
2008	Our Happy Ending	우리들의 해피엔딩
2008	Spotlight	스포트라이트
2008	The Lawyers of the Korea	대한민국 변호사
2008	Beethoven Virus	베토벤 바이러스
2008–2009	General Hospital 2	종합병원 2
2009	The Return of Iljimae	돌아온 일지매
2009	Cinderella Man	신데렐라 맨
2009	Triple	트리플
2009	Soul	혼
2009	Heading to the Ground	맨땅에 헤딩
2009–2010	Hero	히어로

==== 2010s ====
Year	English title	Korean title
2010	The Woman Who Still Wants to Marry	아직도 결혼하고 싶은 여자
2010	Personal Taste	개인의 취향
2010	I Live Without Incident	나는 별일없이 산다
2010	Running	런닝, 구
2010	Road No. 1	로드 넘버원
2010	Playful Kiss	장난스런 키스
2010	Home Sweet Home	즐거운 나의 집
2011	My Princess	마이 프린세스
2011	Royal Family	로열 패밀리
2011	The Greatest Love	최고의 사랑
2011	Heartstrings	넌 내게 반했어
2011	Can't Lose	지고는 못살아
2011	Me Too, Flower!	나도 꽃
2012	Moon Embracing the Sun	해를 품은 달
2012	The King 2 Hearts	더킹 투하츠
2012	I Do, I Do	아이두 아이두
2012	Arang and the Magistrate	아랑사또전
2012–2013	Missing You	보고싶다
2013	7th Grade Civil Servant	7급 공무원
2013	When a Man Falls in Love	남자가 사랑할 때
2013	The Queen's Classroom	여왕의 교실
2013	Two Weeks	투윅스
2013	Medical Top Team	메디컬탑팀
2013–2014	Miss Korea	미스코리아
2014	Cunning Single Lady	앙큼한 돌싱녀
2014	A New Leaf	개과천선
2014	You Are My Destiny	운명처럼 널 사랑해
2014	My Spring Days	내 생애 봄날
2014	Mr. Back	미스터 백
2015	Kill Me, Heal Me	킬미, 힐미
2015	Angry Mom	앵그리맘
2015	Warm and Cozy	맨도롱 또똣
2015	The Scholar Who Walks the Night	밤을 걷는 선비
2015	She Was Pretty	그녀는 예뻤다
2015–2016	Sweet, Savage Family	달콤살벌 패밀리
2016	One More Happy Ending	한번 더 해피엔딩
2016	Goodbye Mr. Black	굿바이 미스터 블랙
2016	Lucky Romance	운빨로맨스
2016	W	더블유
2016	Shopping King Louie	쇼핑왕 루이
2016–2017	Weightlifting Fairy Kim Bok-joo	역도요정 김복주
2017	Missing 9	미씽나인
2017	Radiant Office	자체발광 오피스
2017	The Emperor: Owner of the Mask	군주-가면의 주인
2017	Man Who Dies to Live	죽어야 사는 남자
2017	Hospital Ship	병원선
2017–2018	I'm Not a Robot	로봇이 아니야
2018	Hold Me Tight	손 꼭 잡고, 지는 석양을 바라보자
2018	Come and Hug Me	이리와 안아줘
2018	The Time	시간
2018	My Secret Terrius	내 뒤에 테리우스
2018–2019	Children of Nobody	붉은 달 푸른 해
2019	Spring Turns to Spring	봄이 오나 봄
2019	The Banker	더 뱅커
2019	One Spring Night	봄밤
2019	Rookie Historian Goo Hae-ryung	신입사관 구해령
2019	Extraordinary You	어쩌다 발견한 하루
2019–2020	Love with Flaws	하자있는 인간들

==== 2020s ====
Year	English title	Korean title
2020	The Game: Towards Zero	더 게임:0시를 향하여
2020	Kkondae Intern	꼰대인턴
2020	She Knows Everything	미쓰리는 알고 있다
2020	Chip In	십시일반
2020	When I Was the Most Beautiful	내가 가장 예뻤을때
2020	The Spies Who Loved Me	나를 사랑한 스파이
2021	Oh! Master	오! 주인님
2021	Here's My Plan	목표가 생겼다
2021	On the Verge of Insanity	미치지 않고서야
2022	May I Help You?	일당백집사
TBA	Starry Us	별이 빛나는 우리

==== Wednesday (21:00) ====
- A Good Day to Be a Dog (오늘도 사랑스럽개; October 11, 2023 – January 10, 2024)

=== Friday–Saturday ===
==== 2000s ====
Year	English title	Korean title
2001–2002	Wuri's Family	우리집
2002	Friends	프렌즈
2004	Star's Echo	별의 소리

==== 2020s ====
Off-Air On-Air Upcoming

Year	English title	Korean title
2020	SF8	에스 에프 에잇
2021	The Veil	검은 태양
2021–2022	The Red Sleeve	옷소매 붉은 끝동
2022	Tracer	트레이서
2022	Tomorrow	내일
2022	Doctor Lawyer	닥터 로이어
2022	Big Mouth	빅마우스
2022	The Golden Spoon	금수저
2022	Fanletter, Please!	팬레터를 보내주세요
2022–2023	The Forbidden Marriage	금혼령, 조선 혼인 금지령
2023	Kokdu: Season of Deity	꼭두의 계절
2023	Joseon Attorney	조선변호사
2023	Numbers	넘버스: 빌딩숲의 감시자들
2023	My Dearest	연인
2023–2024	The Story of Park's Marriage Contract	열녀 박씨 계약 결혼뎐
2024	Knight Flower	밤에 피는 꽃
2024	Wonderful World	원더풀 월드
2024	Chief Detective 1958	수사반장 1958
2024	Bitter Sweet Hell	우리집
2024	The Pork Cutlets	나는 돈가스가 싫어요
2024	Black Out	백설공주에게 죽음을
2024	Doubt	이토록 친밀한 배신자
2024	When the Phone Rings	지금 거신 전화는
2025	Motel California	모텔 캘리포니아
2025	Undercover High School	언더커버 하이스쿨
2025	Crushology 101	바니와 오빠들
2025	A Head Coach's Turnover	맹감독의 악플러
2025	Oh My Ghost Clients	노무사 노무진
2025	Mary Kills People	메리 킬즈 피플
2025	To the Moon	달까지 가자
2025	Moon River	이강에는 달이 흐른다
2026	The Judge Returns	판사 이한영
2026	In Your Radiant Season	찬란한 너의 계절에
2026	Perfect Crown	21세기 대군 부인
2026	Fifties Professionals	오십프로
2026	A Bona Fide Killer	유부녀 킬러
2026	The Perfect Lie	라이어
2026	Your Ground	너의 그라운드

=== Saturday–Sunday ===
==== Saturday–Sunday (20:40) ====
- From Now On, Showtime! (지금부터 쇼타임!; 2022)

==== Saturday night dramas ====
- Check Out the Event (이벤트를 확인하세요; 2021)

==== Sunday morning dramas ====
===== 1980s =====
Year	English title	Korean title
1986–1994	Under the Same Roof	한지붕 세가족

===== 1990s =====
Year	English title	Korean title
1994–1998	Partner	짝
1998–2000	All I Know is Love	사랑밖엔 난 몰라

===== 2000s =====
Year	English title	Korean title
2000–2001	Say It with Your Eyes	눈으로 말해요
2001–2002	How Should I Be?	어쩌면 좋아
2002	Love Rollercoaster	사랑을 예약하세요
2003	Good News	기쁜 소식
2003	1% of Anything	1%의 어떤 것
2004	People of the Water Flower Village	물꽃마을 사람들
2004–2005	Sweet Buns	단팥빵

==== Weekend soap operas ====
===== 2000s =====
Year	English title	Korean title
2000–2001	Mom and Sister	엄마야 누나야
2005	Beating Heart	떨리는 가슴
2005	Recipe of Love	사랑찬가
2005–2006	Let's Get Married	결혼합시다
2006	Love Truly	진짜진짜 좋아해
2006–2007	My Beloved Sister	누나
2007	Moon-hee	문희
2007–2008	Kimcheed Radish Cubes	깍두기
2008	Woman of Matchless Beauty, Park Jung-geum	천하일색 박정금
2008–2009	My Life's Golden Age	내 인생의 황금기
2009	Good Job, Good Job	잘했군 잘했어
2009	Tamra, the Island	탐나는 도다
2009–2010	Creating Destiny	인연 만들기

===== 2010s =====
Year	English title	Korean title
2010	Blossom Sisters	민들레 가족
2010–2011	Gloria	글로리아
2011	Twinkle Twinkle	반짝반짝 빛나는
2011–2012	A Thousand Kisses	천번의 입맞춤
2012	God of War	무신
2012–2013	Sons	아들 녀석들
2013	Pots of Gold	금 나와라, 뚝딱!
2013–2014	A Little Love Never Hurts	사랑해서 남주나
2014	Jang Bo-ri Is Here!	왔다! 장보리
2014–2015	Rosy Lovers	장미빛 연인들
2015	Make a Woman Cry	여자를 울려
2015–2016	My Mom	엄마
2016	Happy Home	가화만사성
2016–2017	Blow Breeze	불어라 미풍아
2017	You Are Too Much	당신은 너무합니다
2017–2018	Man in the Kitchen	밥상 차리는 남자
2018	The Rich Son	부잣집 아들
2018–2019	My Healing Love	내사랑 치유기

==== Weekend special project dramas ====
===== 2000s =====
Year	English title	Korean title
2000–2001	5th Republic	제5공화국
2005–2006	Shin Don	신돈
2006	Fireworks	불꽃놀이
2006	Looking for Dorothy	도로시를 찾아라
2006	Couple or Trouble	환상의 커플
2007	Behind the White Tower	하얀 거탑
2007	Que Sera Sera	케세라, 세라
2007	Air City	에어시티
2007	Two Outs in the Ninth Inning	9회말 2아웃
2008	Last Scandal	마지막 스캔들
2008	Bitter Sweet Life	달콤한 인생
2009	Friend, Our Legend	친구, 우리들의 전설
2009–2010	Assorted Gems	보석비빔밥

===== 2010s =====
Year	English title	Korean title
2010	A Man Called God	신이라 불리운 사나이
2010	Kim Su-ro, The Iron King	김수로
2010–2011	Flames of Desire	욕망의 불꽃
2011	Listen to My Heart	내 마음이 들리니
2011–2012	Bravo, My Love!	애정만만세
2012	Feast of the Gods	신들의 만찬
2012	Dr. Jin	닥터 진
2012	May Queen	메이퀸
2013	A Hundred Year Legacy	백년의 유산
2013	The Scandal	스캔들: 매우 충격적이고 부도덕한 사건
2013–2014	Golden Rainbow	황금 무지개
2014	Hotel King	호텔킹
2014	Mama	마마 – 세상 무서울 게 없는
2014	4 Legendary Witches	전설의 마녀
2015	Flower of Queen	여왕의 꽃
2015–2016	My Daughter, Geum Sa-wol	내 딸, 금사월
2016	Marriage Contract	결혼계약
2016	Flowers of the Prison	옥중화
2016–2017	Father, I'll Take Care of You	아버님 제가 모실게요
2017	Bad Thief, Good Thief	도둑놈, 도둑님
2017–2018	Money Flower	돈꽃
2018	My Contracted Husband, Mr. Oh	데릴남편 오작두
2018	Goodbye to Goodbye	이별이 떠났다
2018	Hide and Seek	숨바꼭질
2018–2019	A Pledge to God	신과의 약속
2019	Love in Sadness	슬플 때 사랑한다
2019	Different Dreams	이몽
2019	The Golden Garden	황금정원
2019–2020	Never Twice	두 번은 없다

=== Daily dramas ===
==== Monday–Friday ====
===== 1990s =====
Year	English title	Korean title
1998–1999	See and See Again	보고 또 보고
1999–2000	Days of Delight	날마다 행복해

===== 2000s =====
Year	English title	Korean title
2000	Because of You	당신 때문에
2000–2001	Foolish Princes	온달왕자들
2001	Law of Marriage	결혼의 법칙
2001–2002	Every Day with You	매일 그대와
2002–2003	Miss Mermaid	인어 아가씨
2003	Swan Lake	백조의 호수
2003–2004	Pretty Woman	귀여운 여인
2004–2005	Lotus Flower Fairy	왕꽃 선녀님
2005	Be Strong, Geum-soon!	굳세어라 금순아
2005–2006	The Youth in Bare Feet	맨발의 청춘
2006	Love Can't Wait	사랑은 아무도 못말려
2006	So in Love	얼마나 좋길래
2007	Bad Woman, Good Woman	나쁜 여자 착한 여자
2007–2008	Opposites Attract	아현동 마님
2008	Chunja's Special Day	춘자네 경사났네
2008–2009	Don't Cry My Love	사랑해, 울지마
2009	What's for Dinner?	밥 줘
2009–2010	Enjoy Life	살맛 납니다

===== 2010s =====
Year	English title	Korean title
2010	Golden Fish	황금물고기
2010–2011	Stormy Lovers	폭풍의 연인
2011	I Trusted Him	남자를 믿었네
2011	The Invincible Daughters-in-Law	불굴의 며느리
2011–2012	The Best Day in My Life	오늘만 같아라
2012	Can't Live Without You	그대없인 못살아
2012	Here Comes Mr. Oh	오자룡이 간다
2012–2013	Here Comes Mr. Oh	오자룡이 간다
2013	Princess Aurora	오로라 공주
2013–2014	Shining Romance	빛나는 로맨스
2014	Make Your Wish	소원을 말해봐
2014–2015	The Invincible Lady Cha	불굴의 차여사
2015	The Great Wives	위대한 조강지처
2015–2016	Dearest Lady	최고의 연인
2016	Begin Again	다시 시작해
2016–2017	Happiness Giver	행복을 주는 사람
2017	The Return of Fortunate Bok	돌아온 복단지
2017–2018	Enemies from the Past	전생에 웬수들
2018–2019	Secrets and Lies	비밀과 거짓말
2019	Blessing of the Sea	용왕님 보우하사
2019	Everybody Say Kungdari	모두 다 쿵따리
2019–2020	Bad Love	나쁜 사랑

===== 2020s =====
Off-Air On-Air Upcoming

Year	English title	Korean title
2020–2021	My Wonderful Life	찬란한 내 인생
2021	A Good Supper	밥이 되어라
2021–2022	The Second Husband	두 번째 남편
2022	The Secret House	비밀의 집
2022–2023	Game of Witches	마녀의 게임
2023	Meant to Be	하늘의 인연
2023–2024	The Third Marriage	세 번째 결혼
2024	The Brave Yong Su-jeong	용감무쌍 용수정
2024–2025	Desperate Mrs. Seonju	친절한 선주씨
2025	The Woman Who Swallowed the Sun	태양을 삼킨 여자
2025–2026	The First Man	첫 번째 남자
2026	Family Register	가족관계증명서

==== Monday–Saturday (09:00) ====
- Sisters of the Sea (자매바다; 2005–2006)
- End of Love (이제 사랑은 끝났다; 2006) (changed timeslot to 07:50 on 1 May 2006)

==== Historical soap opera ====
- Hur Jun, The Original Story (구암 허준; 2013)
- The King's Daughter, Soo Baek-hyang (제왕의 딸, 수백향; 2013–2014)

==== Morning soap opera ====
===== 2000s =====
Year	English title	Korean title
2006	End of Love	이제 사랑은 끝났다
2006–2007	Love Me When You Can	있을때 잘해!!
2007	By My Side	내 곁에 있어!
2007–2008	Even So Love	그래도 좋아!
2008	Don't Go Away	흔들리지마
2008–2009	White Lies	하얀 거짓말
2009–2010	I Can't Stop	멈출 수 없어

===== 2010s =====
Year	English title	Korean title
2010	Pink Lipstick	분홍 립스틱
2010–2011	The Scarlet Letter	주홍글씨
2011	You're So Pretty	당신 참 예쁘다
2011–2012	Dangerous Woman	위험한 여자
2012	Angel's Choice	천사의 선택
2012–2013	It Was Love	사랑했나봐
2013	You Are the Boss!	잘났어 정말
2013–2014	Hold My Hand	내 손을 잡아
2014	Everybody Say Kimchi	모두 다 김치
2014–2015	Stormy Woman	폭풍의 여자
2015	Love of Eve	이브의 사랑
2015–2016	Victory For Tomorrow	내일도 승리
2016	Good Person	좋은 사람
2016–2017	Always Spring	언제나 봄날
2017	Teacher Oh Soon-nam	훈장 오순남
2017–2018	Reverse	역류

==== Drama specials ====
- Jikji (2005)
- Splash Splash Love (2015)

==== Sitcoms ====
===== 2000s =====
Year	English title	Korean title
2000–2005	Nonstop	논스톱
2005–2006	Hello Franceska	안녕, 프란체스카
2006–2007	High Kick!	거침없이 하이킥
2007–2008	Kimchi Cheese Smile	김치 치즈 스마일
2008	Elephant	코끼리
2008	The Secret of Coocoo Island	크크섬의 비밀
2008–2009	Here He Comes	그분이 오신다
2009	Hilarious Housewives	태희 혜교 지현이
2009–2010	High Kick Through the Roof	지붕뚫고 하이킥

===== 2010s =====
Year	English title	Korean title
2010	Cutie Pie	볼수록 애교만점
2010–2011	All My Love For You	몽땅내사랑
2011–2012	High Kick: Revenge of the Short Legged	하이킥! : 짧은 다리의 역습
2012	Standby	스탠바이
2012	Mom is Acting Up	엄마가 뭐길래

==== Special project dramas ====
- Mother's Garden (엄마의 정원; 2014)
- Apgujeong Midnight Sun (압구정 백야; 2014–2015)
- A Daughter Just Like You (딱 너 같은 딸; 2015)
- Beautiful You (아름다운 당신; 2015–2016)
- Working Mom Parenting Daddy (워킹 맘 육아 대디; 2016)
- Golden Pouch (황금주머니; 2016–2017)
- Sisters-in-Law (별별 며느리; 2017)

== Children's programs ==
- Popopo (the longest-running children's programme in South Korea; 1981–2013, 2017–present)
- Animaniacs (2000–2004)
- Geisters (2001)
- Run=Dim (Korean-Japanese co-production; 2001)
- Doraemon (2001–2002)
- Spheres (2003–2004)
- Nalong (2004–2006)
- Nalong 2 (2006–2007)
- Pucca (2007–2008, 2018–2019)

== News and current affairs ==
- MBC News Today (MBC 뉴스투데이, breakfast newscast)
- 930 MBC News (930 MBC 뉴스, brunch newscast)
- 12 MBC News (12 MBC 뉴스, midday newscast)
- News Exhibit (2시 뉴스 외전, news and talk show program)
- MBC 5 News & Economy (MBC 5시 뉴스와 경제, afternoon news and economics broadcast)
- MBC Newsdesk (MBC 뉴스데스크, main evening and flagship newscast since 1970)
- MBC News 25 (MBC 뉴스25, late night newscast)
- MBC 100 Minute Debate (MBC 100분 토론, multiple-party debate programme)
- News Magazine 2580 (시사매거진 2580)
- PD Note
- Exploration Planning Straight (탐사기획 스트레이트, sunday night investigative reporting program)
- News 'WHO'? (2006–present)
- MBC Human Theatre (with SS501's Park Jung-min)
- The Real Story Eye (리얼스토리눈) (2014–present)

== Specials ==
- Girls' Generation's Christmas Fairy Tale (2011)
- Girls' Generation's Romantic Fantasy (2013)

== Variety shows ==
=== Current programs ===
Year	English title	Korean title
1981–present	Sunday Night	일밤
2005–present	Show! Music Core	쇼! 음악중심
2006–present	Golden Fishery	황금어장
2007–present	Radio Star	라디오스타
2010–present	Idol Star Athletics Championships	아이돌스타 육상 선수권 대회
2011–present	Weekly Idol	주간 아이돌
2013–present	I Live Alone	나 혼자 산다
2015–present	King of Mask Singer	미스터리 음악쇼 복면가왕
2018–present	Omniscient Interfering View	전지적 참견 시점
2019–present	Hangout with Yoo	놀면 뭐하니?
2025–present	Good Day	굿데이

=== Former programs ===
==== 2000s ====
Former programs in 2000s
- Infinite Challenge (무한도전; 2005–2018)
- We Got Married (우리 결혼했어요; 2008–2017)
- Girls' Generation's Horror Movie Factory (소녀시대의 공포영화 제작소; 2009)
- Girls' Generation's Cheer Up! (소녀시대의 힘내라 힘!; 2009)

==== 2010s ====
Former programs in 2010s
- I Am a Singer (나는 가수다); 2011–2015)
- Dad! Where Are We Going? (아빠! 어디가?; 2013–2015)
- Real Men (진짜 사나이; 2013–2016)
- Animals (애니멀즈; 2015)
- Duet Song Festival (듀엣가요제; 2016–2017)
- Secretly Greatly (은밀하게 위대하게; 2016–2017)
- Thinking About My Bias (오빠생각; 2017)
- Wizard of Nowhere (오지의 마법사; 2017–2018)
- Dunia: Into a New World (두니아 – 처음 만난 세계; 2018)
- Unexpected Q (뜻밖의 Q; 2018)
- Those Who Cross the Line (선을 넘는 녀석들; 2018–2020)
- Under Nineteen (언더나인틴; 2018–2019)
- Love Me Actually (호구의연애; 2019)

==== 2020s ====
Former programs in 2020s
- Paik Father Don't Stop The Food! (백파더: 요리를 멈추지 마!; 2020–2021)
- Crazy Recipe Adventure (볼빨간 신선놀음; 2021)
- Extreme Debut Wild Idol (극한데뷔 야생돌; 2021)
- My Teenage Girl (방과 후 설렘; 2021)
- Fantasy Boys (소년판타지; 2023)
- I'm Sunny Thank You (아임써니땡큐; 2025)

=== Others ===
- Dance Battle Korea
- Idol Dance D-Style
- KPop Generation
- Ranking Chart 8
- OST KING
- Live sound landscape picnic
- K-POP Super Collection
- Super Idol

== See also ==
- List of programs broadcast by Arirang TV
- List of programs broadcast by the Korean Broadcasting System
- List of programs broadcast by Seoul Broadcasting System
- List of programs broadcast by tvN (South Korean TV channel)
- List of programs broadcast by JTBC
