= Hanho Heung-Up =

South Korean animation studio

Hanho Heung-Up Co., Ltd. 한호흥업㈜
- Industry: Animation
- Founded: 1984; 42 years ago
- Founder: Steven Hahn
- Headquarters: Seoul, South Korea
- Products: Feature films, television series

Hanho Heung-Up Co., Ltd. (한호흥업㈜) is an animation service studio based in Seoul, South Korea. Founded in 1984 by Steven Hahn, over the years the studio has produced animation for many of the industry’s leading SVOD, cable, and broadcast studios and distributors, including Disney, Warner Bros., Fox, Netflix, Nickelodeon, Comedy Central, and others. Hanho has worked on dozens of TV-series and feature films, including: Alvin and the Chipmunks, Star Wars: Droids, The Real Ghostbusters, Teenage Mutant Ninja Turtles, The Spectacular Spider-Man, Bob's Burgers, Doug, The New Adventures of Winnie the Pooh, The Magic School Bus, Turbo FAST and many more. In its native land, Hanho is best known for its work on Fly, Superboard, which aired on the KBS network from 1990 to 2002.

The company traces its origins to Dong Seo Animation, established in 1973, which itself traces its origins to International Art Production, a studio responsible for redrawn colorized versions of Looney Tunes, Betty Boop, Krazy Kat, and other black and white cartoons in the late 60's and early 70's.

Kim Seok-ki is the company's president and CEO.

== Production credits ==
Year	Title	Format	Episode count	Primary animation company	Notes
1983–85	Mister T	Series	30	Ruby-Spears Productions	
1984–85	Dragon's Lair	Series	13	Ruby-Spears Productions	
1984	Space Ace	Series	13	Ruby-Spears Productions	Aired as segments on Saturday Supercade
1984	Turbo Teen	Series	13	Ruby-Spears Productions	
1984–87	Alvin and the Chipmunks (seasons 2–5)	Series	39	Ruby-Spears Productions	
1985	Strawberry Shortcake Meets the Berrykins	Special	1	Nelvana	
1985	Starchaser: The Legend of Orin	Film	—N/a	—N/a	Credited as "Young Sung Production Co. Ltd."
1985	The Care Bears Movie	Film	—N/a	Nelvana, co-produced with Wang Film Productions/Cuckoo's Nest Studios and Mihahn	
1985–86	Star Wars: Droids	Series	13 (+1 special)	Nelvana; LucasFilm	
1985–86	Hulk Hogan's Rock 'n' Wrestling	Series	26	DiC Entertainment	
1985–91	Disney's Adventures of the Gummi Bears	Series	65	Walt Disney Television Animation	
1985–87	Clémentine	Series	39	IDDH	Uncredited
1986	Bleu, l'enfant de la Terre	Series	13	IDDH	Unaired outside its native France
1986	SilverHawks	Series	65	Rankin/Bass Productions	
1986	Karate Kommandos	Series	5	Ruby-Spears Productions	
1986	I, Renart	Series	26	IDDH	
1986	When the Wind Blows	Film	—N/a	TVC	
1986	Derrou Juniors	—N/a	—N/a	—N/a	—N/a
1986–88	The Care Bears Family	Series	49	Nelvana	
1986–91	The Real Ghostbusters	Series	140	DiC Entertainment	
1987–2005	Animated Stories from the New Testament	Series	24	Rich Animation Studios	
1987–2005	Animated Stories from the Bible	Series	12	Rich Animation Studios	
1987	Animated Stories from the Book of Mormon	Series	14	Rich Animation Studios	
1987	My Pet Monster	Series	13	Nelvana	
1987	The Chipmunk Adventure	Film	—N/a		Uncredited; additional animation by Sullivan Bluth Studios
1987–96	Teenage Mutant Ninja Turtles	Series	193	Fred Wolf Films	
1988	Dennis the Menace (season 2)	Series	13	DiC Entertainment; Toei Animation	
1988	Technological Threat	Short	1	Kroyer Films	Credited as "Hanho Heung-up Co., Ltd."
1988	The Wild Puffalumps	Special	1	Nelvana	
1988	Denver, the Last Dinosaur	Series	50	World Events Productions	
1988	Dino-Riders	Series	14		First two episodes only; replaced by AKOM Productions Ltd.
1988	Care Bears Nutcracker Suite	Film	—N/a	Nelvana	
1989	Molierissimo	Series	26	DIHR	
1989	Babar: The Movie	Film	—N/a	Nelvana Limited; Ellipse Programme; The Clifford Ross Company	Additional production services
1989–90	Chip 'n Dale Rescue Rangers	Series	65	Walt Disney Television Animation	
1989–91	Babar	Series	65	Nelvana	
1990	Marianne the First	Series	26	IDDH	
1990–91	Little Rosey	Series	18	Nelvana	Animated series based on Roseanne Barr's childhood
1991	The Adventures of Lotty	Series	—N/a	—N/a	
1991	Beetlejuice (season 4)	Series	65	Nelvana	
1991	The Simpsons	Promotion	—N/a	Klasky-Csupo	
1991	The New Adventures of Winnie the Pooh (season 4)	Series	8	Walt Disney Television Animation	
1991	Rover Dangerfield	Film	—N/a	Hyperion Animation	Credited as "Hanho Heung-up Company"
1991–97	Rupert	Series	65	Nelvana	
1991–92	The Adventures of Tintin	Series	39	Ellipse Animation; Nelvana	
1991–92	A Bunch of Munsch	Series	7	CINAR	
1991–92	TaleSpin	Series	65	Walt Disney Television Animation	
1991–92	Darkwing Duck	Series	91	Walt Disney Television Animation	
1991–94	Doug	Series	52	Games Animation; Jumbo Pictures	Credited as "Hanho Studio"
1991–2003	Adventures in Odyssey	Series	17		An Evangelical Christian animated direct-to-video series
1992	The Rosey & Buddy Show	Special	1	Nelvana	Spin-off from Little Rosey
1992	FernGully: The Last Rainforest	Film	—N/a	Kroyer Films	Credited as "Hanho Animation Studio"
1992	Mafalda	—N/a	—N/a	—N/a	
1993	Psyched for Snuppa (pilot for Sniz & Fondue)	Short	1	Jumbo Pictures	Credited as "Hanho Studio"
1993	SWAT Kats: The Radical Squadron (season 1)	Series	13	Hanna-Barbera Cartoons	
1993	Shelley Duvall's Bedtime Stories (season 2)	Series	6	Universal Cartoon Studios	
1994	Conan and the Young Warriors	Series	13	Sunbow Animation; AKOM	Sequel to Conan the Adventurer (1992–93), based on Robert E. Howard's character
1994	Sam & Ghost Campaign	Promotion	—N/a		
1994	MBC-TV Campaign	Promotion	—N/a		
1994	The Busy World of Richard Scarry (season 1)	Series	13	CINAR; France Animation	Based on the Busytown books by Richard Scarry
1994	The Swan Princess	Film	—N/a	Rich Animation Studios	
1994–95	Free Willy	Series	21	Nelvana; Warner Bros. Animation	Based on Warner Bros.' film of the same name
1994–97	The Magic School Bus	Series	52	Nelvana	Based on Joanna Cole and Bruce Degen's book series of the same name
1995	Orson and Olivia	Series	26	Ellipse Programme	Based on the French comic series Basil et Victoria by Edith Yann
1995	Mot	Series	26	Ellipse Programme	Based on the children's comics by Alfonso Azpiri
1995	The Tale of Tillie's Dragon	Film	—N/a	Stribling Productions	
1995–96	The Neverending Story: The Animated Adventures of Bastian Balthazar Bux	Series	26	Ellipse Programme	Loosely based on Michael Ende's book of the same name
1996	Project G.e.e.K.e.R.	Series	13	Doug²; Adelaide Productions	
1996	Stone Protectors	Series	13	Graz Entertainment; Sachs TV Entertainment	
1996	Toonstruck	Video game	—N/a	Burst Studios	
1996	Ozter	Series	—N/a	—N/a	—N/a
1996–97	Gargoyles (season 3, subtitled The Goliath Chronicles)	Series	13	Walt Disney Television Animation; Nelvana	
1996–97	Waynehead	Series	13	Nelvana; Warner Bros. Animation	
1996–98	Blazing Dragons	Series	26	Nelvana; Ellipse Programme	
1997	Ivanhoe the King's Knight	Series	52	CINAR; France Animation	
1997	The Swan Princess: Escape from Castle Mountain	Film	—N/a	Rich Animation Studios	
1997	Extreme Ghostbusters	Series	40	Adelaide Productions	
1997–98	Blake and Mortimer	Series	26	Ellipse Programme	Based on Edgar Pierre Jacobs' comic series of the same name
1997–98	Channel Umptee-3	Series	13	Adelaide Productions; Enchant George	
1998	Stickin' Around (season 3)	Series	13	Nelvana	
1998	Bob Morane	Series	26	Canal+	Based on Henri Vernes' adventure novel series
1998	The Swan Princess III: The Mystery of the Enchanted Treasure	Film	—N/a	Rich Animation Studios	
1998	Buster & Chauncey's Silent Night	Film	—N/a	Tundra Productions	
1998–99	Disney's Hercules: The Animated Series	Series	65	Walt Disney Television Animation	
1998–2000	Papyrus	Series	52	Walt Disney Television Animation; Nelvana	
1999	The King and I	Film	—N/a	Rich Animation Studios	Loosely based on the Rodgers and Hammerstein musical of the same name
1999–2002	Redwall	Series	39	Nelvana; Alphanim; TV-Loonland AG	Based on Brian Jacques' novel series
1999–2004	Pirate Family	Series	40	Ellipsanime	
1999–2000	Tom et Sheenah	Series	18	Métal Hurlant Productions	
2000	The Fantastic Flying Journey	Series	9	Two Sides TV; TV-Loonland AG	Based on Gerald Durrell's 1987 children's book
2000	The New Adventures of Ocean Girl	Series	26	Animation Works	Inspired by the live-action series Ocean Girl
2000–02	Maggie and the Ferocious Beast	Series	26	Nelvana	Based on Michael and Betty Paraskevas' children's book The Ferocious Beast with the Polka-Dot Hide and its sequels
2001–02	Anne of Green Gables: The Animated Series	Series	26	Sullivan Animation; Annemation Productions Inc.	Based on L. M. Montgomery's children's novel of the same name
2001	The Trumpet of the Swan	Film	—N/a	RichCrest Animation Studios	Based on E.B. White's children's novel of the same name
2001	"Boiler" by Limp Bizkit	Music video	—N/a		Uncredited
2001	Santa, Baby!	Special	1	Rankin/Bass Animated Entertainment	
2001	Aida of the Trees	Film	—N/a	Lanterna Magica	Based on Giuseppe Verdi's opera Aida
2002	The Dangerous Lives of Altar Boys	Film	—N/a	Todd McFarlane Productions	Comic book scenes; uncredited
2002	WinneToons	Series	26	AniMagix AG	Based on Karl May's character Winnetou
2002	"Objection" by Shakira	Music video	—N/a		Uncredited
2002	Beyblade: Fierce Battle	Film	—N/a	Nippon Animation	Based on the Beyblade manga by Takao Aoki
2002–07	Kim Possible	6	87	Walt Disney Television Animation	
2003	Ark	Film	—N/a	Digital Rim	
2003	The Boy	—N/a	—N/a	—N/a	
2003	Globi and the Stolen Shadows	Film	—N/a	MotionWorks	
2003	Toto Sapore and the Magic Story of Pizza	Film	—N/a	Lanterna Magica	Loosely based on Roberto Piumini and Edoardo Porcaro's novel Il Cuoco prigioniero
2003	The Animatrix	Segment: "Matriculated"	—N/a	DNA Productions	Ink and paint
2003	EyeToy Tales	Video game	—N/a	SCE Korea; YBM Sisa	
2003–06	Kid Paddle	Series	104	Spectra Animation	Based on Midam's comic series of the same name
2003–04	Spheres	Series	26	Studio Kaab	Digital color
2005	Tom and Jerry: The Fast and the Furry	Film	—N/a	Turner Entertainment Co. Warner Bros. Animation	
2005–06	Firehouse Tales	Series	26	Warner Bros. Animation	
2006	PollyWorld	Film	—N/a	curious?ictures	
2006–07	Apple Candy Girl	Series	39	—N/a	
2007	Anatane: Saving the Children of Okura	Series	5	Tooncan	Unfinished
2007	Nocturna	Film	—N/a	Filmax Animation	
2008	Dead Space: Downfall	Film	—N/a	Film Roman	Based on the 2008 video game by Electronic Arts
2008–09	The Spectacular Spider-Man	Series	26	Adelaide Productions	
2009–11	Huntik: Secrets & Seekers	Series	52	Rainbow	
2010–11	G.I. Joe: Renegades	Series	26	Darby Pop Productions	
2010	Fratellini	—N/a	—N/a	—N/a	
2011–present	Bob's Burgers	Series	308	20th Television; Wilo Productions; Buck & Millie Productions; 20th Television Animation	Credited as "Hanho"
2011	Allen Gregory	Series	7	A J. Paul/A. Mogel/D. Goodman Piece of Business	
2011–15	China, IL	Series	30 (+2 pilots)	Neely Comics; Working for Monsters; Titmouse; Williams Street	
2012–15	Brickleberry	Series	36	Damn! Show Productions	
2012–15	Black Dynamite	Series	20	Ars Nova Entertainment; Williams Street; Titmouse; Cartoon Network Studios; N-BOMB SQUAD	Based on the 2009 film of the same name
2013–16	Turbo Fast	Series	52	Titmouse; DreamWorks Animation Television	Based on the 2013 film Turbo
2013	Murder Police	Series	—N/a	Fuzzy Door Productions	Unproduced
2016	Bordertown	Series	13	Hentemann Films	
2017–21	Castlevania	Series	32	Powerhouse Animation; Mua Film; Tiger Animation	Based on the Konami video game franchise of the same name
2018–22	Paradise PD	Series	40	Damn! Show Productions; Bento Box Entertainment	
2018	Anatane: Saving the Children of Okura	Series	26	Les Films de la Perrine; Tooncan; France Télévisions	
2020–22	Duncanville	Series	39	Scullys Productions	
2020–25	Blood of Zeus	Series	24	Powerhouse Animation; Asia Minor Pictures	

=== Original productions ===
- Dooly the Little Dinosaur (아기공룡 둘리) (October 1987 – May 1988, Animation production shared with AKOM, Shin Dong-heon Productions and Sam Young Animation)
- Guru Cabbage and Guru Radish's Once Upon a Time (배추도사 무도사의 옛날 옛적에) (1990, Animation production shared with Dong Yang Animation, Shin Won Animation and Take One)
- Fly, Superboard (날아라 슈퍼보드) (August 1990 – January 2002)
- Eunbi & Kabi's Once Upon a Time (은비 까비의 옛날 옛적에) (1991, Animation production shared with Sei Young Animation and Dong Woo Animation)
- Sun-Shining Tree (햇살나무) (September 23, 1991)
- Hocus Pocus! Story Pouch (콩딱쿵! 이야기 주머니) (1997, Animation production shared with AKOM and Shin Won Productions)
- My Dear Daigoro (내친구 다이고로) (2003)
- Sao Village (사오마을 대소동) (2003)
- Elysium (엘리시움) (2003, Credited as Hanho Animation)
