= Your Letter =

Your Letter may refer to:

- Your Letter (manhwa), a South Korean manhwa by Hyeon A Cho
- Your Letter (film), a South Korean animated film based on the manhwa
- "Your Letter" (song), 2000 song by the group 112

== See also ==
- "In Your Letter", 1980 song by the group REO Speedwagon
