= Kim Yong-jun =

Kim Yong-jun (김용준) is a Korean name consisting of the family name Kim and the given name Yong-joon, and may also refer to:

- Kim Yong-jun (singer) (born 1984), South Korean singer
- Kim Yong-joon (voice actor), South Korean voice actor
- Kim Yong-jun (footballer) (김영준; born 1983), North Korean footballer
- Kim Yong-jun (politician), North Korean politician
- Kim Yong-jun (art critic) (1904–1967)

== See also ==
- Kim Young-jun (disambiguation)
