= Shadow Fighter (TV series) =

South Korean animated television series

- Genre: Action, Adventure
- Showrunner: Kwon Oh-hyeon
- Written by: Lee Ho-seong
- Directed by: O Min-ho; Cha Sujeong
- Voices of: Son Jung-a; Woo Jeong-shin; Kim Ah-yeong; Bak So-ra
- Country of origin: South Korea
- Original language: Korean
- No. of episodes: 26

Production
- Running time: 30 minutes
- Production company: Yellow Film

Original release
- Network: MBC
- Release: July 7, 2005 – January 12, 2006

Shadow Fighter (Korean: 섀도우 파이터) is a 2005 South Korean 3D animated television series produced by Yellow Film for Munhwa Broadcasting Corporation (MBC). The story revolves around the protagonist, a young boy named Cay, who meets Eagle in the forest and becomes a Shadow Fighter.

The show had a budget ₩2.6 billion and took two years to produce. The series features a cel-shaded animation for smooth rendering. All episodes were completed before the series first went live on July 2005. The release date coincided with the introduction of a mandate for the three major Korean broadcasters (MBC, KBS, and SBS) to allocate time for animations.

The series has 26 episodes. On August 2005, the show began to be broadcast in Japan on So-net. In 2007, the show was licensed to Uno Media to be broadcast in Malaysia.

The show was displayed at 2005 Seoul International Cartoon and Animation Festival and Seoul Character Fair.

== Characters ==
- Cay (K) (케이; voiced by Son Jung-a)
- Aqua (아쿠아; voiced by Woo Jeong-shin)
- Luke (루크; voiced by Kim Ah-yeong)
- Ranbi (란비; voiced by Bak So-ra)
- Komangsong (꼬망송; voiced by Kim Seo-yeong)
- Eagle (이글; voiced by Choi Han)
- Shark (샤크; voiced by Kim Youngsun)
- Donk (돈크; voiced by Choi Seok-pil)
- Mata (마타; voiced by Lee Sun)
- Chianka (치앙카; voiced by Kim Yong-joon)
- Baekuino (백의노; voiced by Bang Seong-joon)

== Episodes ==
No.	Title	Original release date
1	"The Birth of Titus"; Transliteration: "Taiteoseuui tansaeng" (Korean: 타이터스의 탄생)	July 7, 2005
2	"Master Cay"; Transliteration: "Maseuteo Kei" (Korean: 마스터 케이)	July 17, 2005
3	"Aqua, the Girl of the Sea"; Transliteration: "Badaui sonyeo Akua" (Korean: 바다의 소녀 아쿠아)	July 21, 2005
4	"The Third Master"; Transliteration: "Se beonjjae maseuteo" (Korean: 세 번째 마스터)	July 28, 2005
5	"The Mysterious Girl"; Transliteration: "Susukkekkiui sonyeo" (Korean: 수수께끼의 소녀)	August 4, 2005
6	"Komangsong, the Wandering Boy"; Transliteration: "Tteodori sonyeon Kkomangsong" (Korean: 떠돌이 소년 꼬망송)	August 11, 2005
7	"The Return of Drastan"; Transliteration: "Doraon Deuraseutan" (Korean: 돌아온 드라스탄)	August 18, 2005
8	"Kidnapped Aqua"; Transliteration: "Napchidoen Akua" (Korean: 납치된 아쿠아)	August 25, 2005
9	"The Search for Cay"; Transliteration: "Kei susaekjakjeon" (Korean: 케이 수색작전)	September 1, 2005
10	"We Are One Team"; Transliteration: "Urineun han tim" (Korean: 우리는 한 팀)	September 8, 2005
11	"Luke's Choice"; Transliteration: "Rukeuui seontaek" (Korean: 루크의 선택)	September 15, 2005
12	"Mata's Return"; Transliteration: "Mataui gwihwan" (Korean: 마타의 귀환)	September 22, 2005
13	"Komangsong's Birthday"; Transliteration: "Kkomangsongui saengil" (Korean: 꼬망송의 생일)	September 29, 2005
14	"Operation: Recover the Shadow Ball"; Transliteration: "Syaedou Bol hoesujakjeon" (Korean: 섀도우 볼 회수작전)	October 6, 2005
15	"Teaching Komangsong"; Transliteration: "Kkomangsong gareuchigi" (Korean: 꼬망송 가르치기)	October 13, 2005
16	"Shark Reborn"; Transliteration: "Syakeu dasi taeeonada" (Korean: 샤크 다시 태어나다)	October 20, 2005
17	"The Mysterious Potion"; Transliteration: "Sinbiui myoyak" (Korean: 신비의 묘약)	October 27, 2005
18	"Wake Up, Eagle!"; Transliteration: "Ireonayo Igeul!" (Korean: 일어나요 이글!)	November 3, 2005
19	"The Great Counterattack"; Transliteration: "Daebangyeok" (Korean: 대반격)	November 10, 2005
20	"Let's Go! To the Celestial Realm!"; Transliteration: "Gaja! Cheongyero!" (Korean: 가자! 천계로!)	November 17, 2005
21	"The First Gateway"; Transliteration: "Cheot beonjjae gwanmun" (Korean: 첫 번째 관문)	November 24, 2005
22	"Hypnosis Flower"; Transliteration: "Choemyeonkkot" (Korean: 최면꽃)	December 8, 2005
23	"The Light Warriors"; Transliteration: "Gwangjeonsa" (Korean: 광전사)	December 15, 2005
24	"Chianka's Coronation"; Transliteration: "Chiangkaui daegwansik" (Korean: 치앙카의 대관식)	December 29, 2005
25	"The End of Chianka"; Transliteration: "Chiangkaui choehu" (Korean: 치앙카의 최후)	January 5, 2006
26	"Unchanging Friendship"; Transliteration: "Byeonhameomneun ujeong" (Korean: 변함없는 우정)	January 12, 2006

== Comics ==
The first Shadow Fighter comic series debuted on July 4, 2005. It was planned as a three-volume series, but no further volumes released after the first.
