= Harvey Award for Best Adaptation from a Comic Book/Graphic Novel =

American award for adaptions of comics

Best Adaptation from a Comic Book/Graphic Novel
- Country: United States
- First award: 2018

The Harvey Award for Best Adaptation from a Comic Book/Graphic Novel, established in 2018 as part of the Harvey Awards, is an annual American award for comics and graphic novels. Per the Harvey Awards website, the award honors the "best adaptation to another medium of a work originally presented as a graphic novel, trade collection or comic book."

In 2018, the Harvey Awards were revamped into six categories, recognizing works as opposed to individual creators as in previous years.

== Winners and Nominees ==
Best Adaptation from a Comic Book/Graphic Novel nominees, 2018–present
Year	Title	Publisher	Adapted from	Original Publisher	Ref.
2018	Black Panther	Marvel Studios	Black Panther	Marvel Comics	
2018	Atomic Blonde	Focus Features	The Coldest City	Oni Press	
2018	The Lego Batman Movie	Warner Bros.	Batman	DC Comics	
2018	Logan	20th Century Fox	Wolverine	Marvel Comics	
2018	My Friend Dahmer	FilmRise	My Friend Dahmer	Abrams ComicArts	
2018	Preacher	AMC	Preacher	DC/Vertigo	
2018	Riverdale	The CW	Archie	Archie Comics	
2018	The End of the F***ing World	Netflix	The End of the F***ing World	Fantagraphics	
2018	Thor: Ragnarok	Walt Disney Pictures	Thor	Marvel Comics	
2018	Wonder Woman	Warner Bros.	Wonder Woman	DC Comics	
2019	Spider-Man: Into the Spider-Verse	Columbia Pictures and Sony Pictures Animation	Spider-Man	Marvel Comics	
2019	Alita: Battle Angel	20th Century Fox	Battle Angel Alita	Kodansha USA	
2019	Avengers: Endgame	Marvel Studios	The Avengers	Marvel Comics	
2019	The Boys	Amazon Studios	The Boys	Dynamite Entertainment	
2019	Captain Marvel	Marvel Studios	Captain Marvel	Marvel Comics	
2019	Chilling Adventures of Sabrina	Netflix	Chilling Adventures of Sabrina	Archie Comics	
2019	Doom Patrol	DC Universe	Doom Patrol	DC Comics	
2019	Marvel's Spider-Man	Insomniac Games/Sony Interactive	Spider-Man	Marvel Comics	
2019	The Snagglepuss Chronicles	Provincetown Tennessee Williams Theater Festival and Die-Cast	Exit, Stage Left!: The Snagglepuss Chronicles	DC Comics	
2019	The Umbrella Academy	Netflix	The Umbrella Academy	Dark Horse Comics	
2020	Watchmen	HBO	Watchmen	DC Comics	
2020	Blacksad: Under the Skin	Microïds	Blacksad	Dark Horse Comics	
2020	I Am Not Okay With This	Netflix	I Am Not Okay With This	Fantagraphics	
2020	Joker	Warner Bros. Pictures	Batman	DC Comics	
2020	Legion: Season 3	FX Productions and Marvel Television	X-Men	Marvel Comics	
2020	Locke & Key: Season 1	Netflix	Locke & Key	IDW Publishing	
2020	The Old Guard	Netflix	The Old Guard	Image Comics	
2020	The Sandman	Audible	The Sandman	DC Comics/Vertigo	
2020	Stumptown: Season 1	ABC	Stumptown	Oni Press	
2020	The Umbrella Academy season 2	Netflix	The Umbrella Academy	Dark Horse Comics	
2021	WandaVision	Disney+	The Avengers	Marvel Comics	
2021	The Boys	Amazon	The Boys	DC Comics	
2021	Invincible	Amazon	Invincible	Image	
2021	Loki	Disney+	The Avengers	Marvel Comics	
2021	Superman & Lois	CW	Superman	DC Comics	
2021	Sweet Tooth	Netflix	Sweet Tooth	DC/Vertigo	
2022	Ms. Marvel	Marvel Studios	Marvel Comics	Marvel	
2022	The Batman		Batman	DC Comics	
2022	El Deafo	Apple TV+	El Deafo	Abrams Books	
2022	Heartstopper	Netflix	Heartstopper by Alice Oseman	Hachette Children's Group	
2022	Mind MGMT: The Psychic Espionage "Game" board game		Mind MGMT by Matt Kindt	Dark Horse Comics	
2022	Paper Girls	Amazon Prime Video	Paper Girls	Image Comics	
2022	Paris, 13th District		"Amber Sweet", "Hawaiian Getaway", and "Killing And Dying" by Adrian Tomine	Drawn & Quarterly	
2022	Peacemaker	HBO Max	Peacemaker	DC Comics	
2022	Shang-Chi and the Legend of the Ten Rings		Shang-Chi	Marvel Comics	
2023	Spider-Man: Across the Spider-Verse	Columbia Pictures and Sony Pictures Animation	Spider-Man	Marvel Comics	
2023	American Born Chinese	Disney+	American Born Chinese	First Second	
2023	Drops of God	Apple TV+	Drops of God	Vertical	
2023	Moon Knight	Disney+	Moon Knight	Marvel Comics	
2023	Nimona	Netflix	Nimona	Quill Tree Books	
2023	The Sandman	Netflix	The Sandman	DC Comics	
2023	She-Hulk	Disney+	She-Hulk	Marvel Comics	
2023	The Stuff of Legend - The Board Game		The Stuff of Legend	Th3rd World Studios	
2023	Sweet Tooth Season 2	Netflix	Sweet Tooth	DC Comics	
2023	Wednesday	Netflix	The Addams Family		
2024	X-Men '97	Marvel Studios Animation and Disney+	X-Men	Marvel Comics	
2024	Justice League: Crisis on Infinite Earths	Warner Bros. Animation & DC Studios	Crisis on Infinite Earths	DC Comics	
2024	Deadpool & Wolverine		Wolverine and Deadpool	Marvel	
2024	MultiVersus (Note: Listed as Multiverses)	Warner Bros Games	Warner Bros properties	Warner Bros	
2024	Demon Slayer – Kimetsu no Yaiba - The Hinokami Chronicles	SEGA	Demon Slayer: Kimetsu no Yaiba	VIZ Media	
2024	Invincible	Amazon Prime Studios	Invincible	Image	
2024	The Marvels	Marvel Studios	Marvel Comics	Marvel	
2024	Loki	Marvel Studios	Loki	Marvel	
2024	Attack on Titan: The Musical		Attack on Titan	Kodansha	
2025	Superman	DC Studios and Warner Bros.	Superman	DC Comics	
2025	Berlin: The Play	Court Theatre	Berlin by Jason Lutes	Drawn & Quarterly	
2025	Boop! The Musical		Betty Boop		
2025	Cat Kid Comic Club!: The Musical		Cat Kid Comic Club by Dav Pilkey	Graphix	
2025	Daredevil: Born Again	Disney+	Daredevil: Born Again, Daredevil		
2025	The Fantastic Four: First Steps	Marvel Studios	Fantastic Four	Marvel Comics	
2025	Paying For It		Paying For It by Chester Brown	Drawn & Quarterly	
2025	The Penguin	Max Original	Penguin	DC Comics	
2025	Thunderbolts	Marvel Studios	Thunderbolts	Marvel Comics	
2026	Spider-Noir	Prime Video/MGM+	Spider-Man Noir	Marvel Comics	
2026	The Boys — Season 5	Prime Video	The Boys	Dynamite	
2026	Chainsaw Man – The Movie: Reze Arc	(Theatrical — Crunchyroll/Sony)	Chainsaw Man	VIZ Media	
2026	Demon Slayer: Infinity Castle	(Theatrical — Crunchyroll/Sony)	Demon Slayer: Kimetsu no Yaiba	VIZ Media	
2026	Invincible — Season 4	Prime Video	Invincible	Image/Skybound	
2026	LEGO Batman: Legacy of the Dark Knight	Warner Bros. Games — PS5/Xbox/Switch/PC	Batman	DC Comics	
2026	My Hero Academia — Final Season	Crunchyroll	My Hero Academia	VIZ Media	
2026	One Piece — Season 2	Netflix	One Piece	VIZ Media	
2026	Peacemaker — Season 2	HBO Max	Peacemaker	DC Comics, originally Charlton	
2026	Your Letter	Netflix	Your Letter	WEBTOON/Naver	

== Records ==
Original Publisher	Nominations	Wins	Title
Marvel Comics	23	7	Black Panther,Logan,Thor: Ragnarok,Spider-Man: Into the Spider-Verse,Avengers: Endgame,Captain Marvel,Marvel's Spider-Man,Legion: Season 3,WandaVision,Loki,Ms. Marvel,Shang-Chi and the Legend of the Ten Rings,Spider-Man: Across the Spider-Verse,Moon Knight,She-Hulk,X-Men '97,Deadpool & Wolverine,The Marvels,Loki,Daredevil: Born Again,The Fantastic Four: First Steps,Thunderbolts and Spider-Noir
DC Comics	20	2	The Lego Batman Movie,Preacher,Wonder Woman,Doom Patrol,The Snagglepuss Chronicles, Watchmen,Joker,The Sandman (2x),The Boys,Superman & Lois,The Batman,Peacemaker,Sweet Tooth,Justice League: Crisis on Infinite Earths,Superman,The Penguin,LEGO Batman: Legacy of the Dark Knight and Peacemaker — Season 2
VIZ Media	5	0	Demon Slayer – Kimetsu no Yaiba - The Hinokami Chronicles,Chainsaw Man – The Movie: Reze Arc,Demon Slayer: Infinity Castle,My Hero Academia — Final Season and One Piece — Season 2
