= Kim Youngsun =

South Korean voice artist (born 1969)

- 김영선
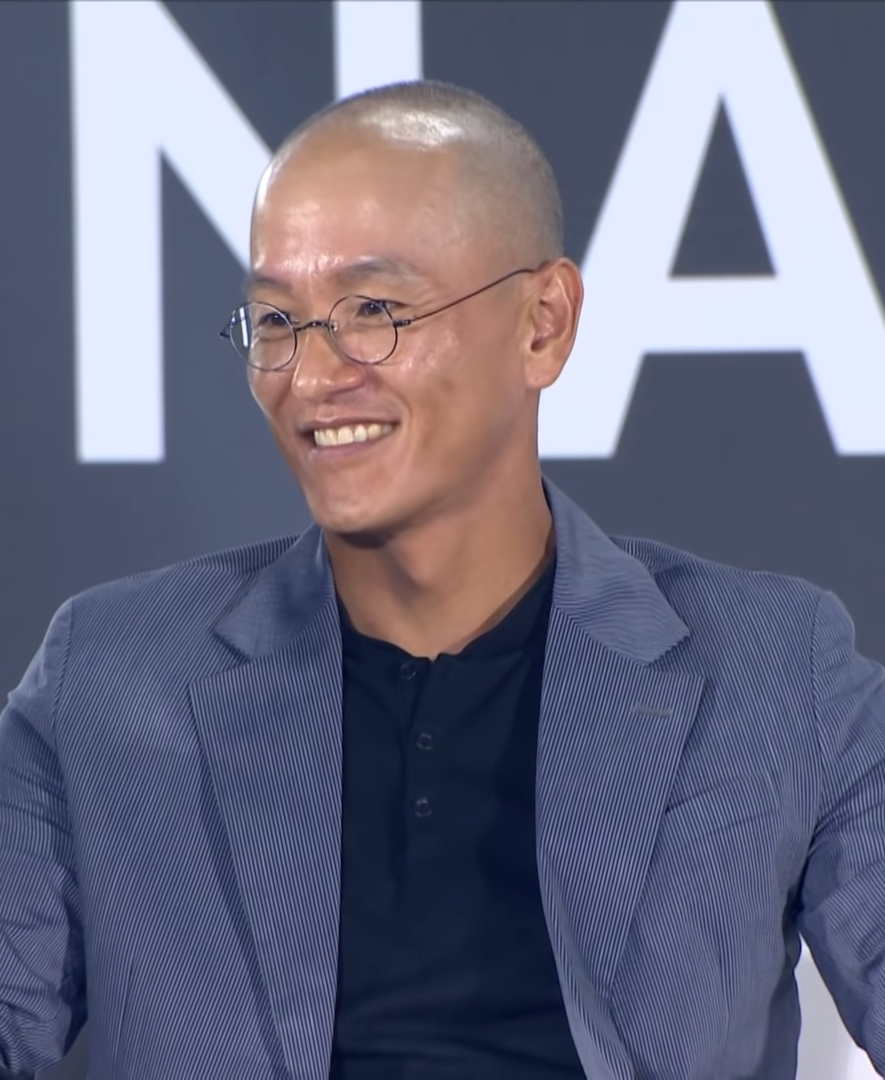
- Kim in 2020
- Born: December 17, 1969 (age 56)
- Occupation: Voice artist
- Years active: 1994–present
- Agent: Munhwa Broadcasting Corporation
- Height: 170 cm (5 ft 7 in)

Kim Youngsun (Korean: 김영선, born December 17, 1969) is a South Korean voice artist who joined the Munhwa Broadcasting Corporation's voice acting division in 1996. He is the official Korean dub-over voice artist for Elijah Wood. He is married to fellow voice actress Bak So-ra.

== Roles ==
=== Video games ===
- Professor Layton as Professor Hershel Layton
- Elsword as Ciel
- King's Raid as Roi
- Grand Chase as Zero
- Mystic Messenger as 707
- MapleStory as Will, Albaire, Limbo, Elwin, White Mage (Borderless/Convergence), Tai Yu, Ryan
- After L!fe as Noah
- Wannabe Challenge as Kim Taehee
- Cookie Run: Kingdom as Sparkling Cookie

=== Broadcast TV ===
- CatDog (JEI TV)-Dog
- Zoids-Van
- Smallville (replaced Tom Welling, Korea TV Edition, MBC)
- Death Note (Anione)- Light Yagami
- CSI: Crime Scene Investigation (replaced George Eads, Korea TV Edition, MBC)
- Buffy the Vampire Slayer (replacing David Boreanaz, Korea TV Edition, MBC)
- Mirmo! (Mirmo Pong Pong Pong, Korea TV Edition, SBS)
- Shadow Fighter (MBC)
- Rexa 3 Country (MBC)
- Hit 30 Years (Radio Drama, MBC)
- Cartoon Fight (Radio Drama in Redmoon, MBC)
- Ojamajo Doremi (Korea TV Edition, MBC)
- Ragnarok the Animation (Korea TV Edition, SBS)
- Spheres (MBC)- Jin
- Nalong (MBC)
- Nalong 2 (MBC)
- Reply's Fighter (Korea TV Edition, MBC)
- Inspect Bruno (Korea TV Edition, MBC)
- Dolphin Plipper (Korea TV Edition, MBC)
- Gangbada (Korea TV Edition, MBC)
- Jimmy Neutron (Korea TV Edition, MBC)
- Beyblade (Top Blade, Korea TV Edition, SBS) - Kai Hiwatari
- Naruto (Korea TV Edition, Tooniverse) - Sasuke Uchiha
- Saiyuki (Korea TV Edition, Anione TV) - Son Goku
- Fate/Stay Night (Korea TV Edition, Animax) (Korea TV Edition) - Shirō Emiya
- Bleach (Korea TV Edition, Animax) – Uryū Ishida
- Viva Pinata (Animax)-Polly
- Romeo × Juliet (Animax)-Romio
- Teenage Mutant Ninja Turtles (Nickelodeon) - Leonardo
- Ben 10 series - Ben Tennyson (15–16 year old) including Ben 10: Alien Force, Ben 10: Ultimate Alien, Ben 10: Omniverse
- One-Punch Man - Saitama (Blu-ray version)
- Titans (Netflix) - Hank Hall
- Regressor Instructions Manual - Lee Kiyoung, Kim Hyunsung, Park Deokgu (teaser)

=== Film dubbing ===
- Impossible (replacing Tom Cruise, Korea TV Edition, MBC)
- The Bourne Identity (replacing Matt Damon, Korea TV Edition, MBC)
- Primal Fear (replacing Edward Norton, Korea TV Edition, MBC)
- Election (replacing Matthew Broderick, Korea TV Edition, MBC)
- The Man in the Iron Mask (replacing Leonardo DiCaprio, Korea TV Edition, MBC)
- The Butterfly Effect (replacing Ashton Kutcher, Korea TV Edition, MBC)
- Before Sunrise (replacing Ethan Hawke, Korea TV Edition, SBS)
- The Lord of the Rings (The Lord of the Rings, replacing Elijah Wood, Korea TV Edition, SBS)
- Eternal Sunshine of the Spotless Mind (replacing Elijah Wood, Korea TV Edition SBS)
- Bobby (replacing Elijah Wood, Korea TV Edition SBS)
- Young Winston (replacing Simon Ward, Korea TV Edition, MBC)
- Starship Troopers (replacing Casper Van Dien, Korea TV Edition, SBS)
- About a Boy (replacing Hugh Grant, Korea TV Edition, MBC)
- S.W.A.T. (replacing Colin Farrell, Korea TV Edition, MBC)
- I Spy (replacing Owen Wilson, Korea TV Edition, MBC)
- The Rundown (Korea name is Welcome to Jungle, replacing Seann William Scott, Korea TV Edition, MBC)
- Shanghai Knights (replacing Owen Wilson, Korea TV Edition, MBC)
- The Day After Tomorrow (replacing Jake Gyllenhaal, Korea TV Edition, MBC)
- Pirates of the Caribbean: The Curse of the Black Pearl (replacing Orlando Bloom, Korea TV Edition, MBC)
- House of Flying Daggers (replacing Takeshi Kaneshiro, Korea TV Edition, MBC)
- A Fairly Odd Movie: Grow Up, Timmy Turner! (replacing Drake Bell, Korea TV Edition, EBS)
- Spirited Away (replacing Haku)
- Howl's Moving Castle (replacing Takuya Kimura)
- Professor Layton and the Eternal Diva (replacing Yo Oizumi)

== See also ==
- Munhwa Broadcasting Corporation
- MBC Voice Acting Division
