= Shadow Fighter =

Shadow Fighter may refers to:

- Shadow Fighter (video game), a 1994 video game for the Amiga and CD32
- Shadow Fighter (TV series), a 2005 South Korean animated television series
- Shadow Fighters, a group of DC Comics characters

== See also ==
- Shadow Fight, a series of video games developed by Banzai.Games and published by Nekki
