= Kim Young-jun =

Kim Young-jun (김영준), also known as Kim Yeong-jun, Kim Yŏng-jun may refer to:

- Kim Young-jun (wrestler) (born 1948), South Korean wrestler
- Kim Young-jun (born 1963) or stage name Yoo Ha, South Korean film director
- Kim Young-jun (tennis) (born 1980), South Korean tennis player
- Kim Yong-jun (footballer) (born 1983), North Korean footballer
- Kim Young-jun (born 1988) or stage name Kim Si-hoo, South Korean actor
- Kim Yeong-jun (volleyball) (born 1940), South Korean volleyball player
- Kim Yeong-jun (field hockey) (born 1967), South Korean Olympic hockey player

== See also ==
- Kim Yong-jun (disambiguation)
