= Mun Seon-hui =

South Korean voice actress

- Hangul: 문선희
- RR: Mun Seonhui
- MR: Mun Sŏnhŭi

Mun Seon-hui (Korean: 문선희; born January 13, 1968) is a South Korean voice actress who works for KBS' Voice Acting Division.

== Anime television series ==
=== 1969 ===
- Scooby-Doo, Where Are You (Velma)

=== 1985 ===
- Dragon Ball (Launch, Chi Chi)

=== 1993 ===
- Slam Dunk (Ayako)
- Yaiba (Sayaka Mine)

=== 1994 ===
- DNA² (Ami Kurimoto)
- I'll Make a Habit of It! (Nagisa Shiratori)

=== 1995 ===
- Jura Tripper (Ojou, Doctor, Mint)
- Romeo's Blue Skies (Angeletta)
- Wedding Peach (Noiizu)

=== 1996 ===
- Case Closed (Jodie Starling)
- Duchi and Puku (Duchi's Sister)
- Rurouni Kenshin (Kamiya Kaoru)

=== 1997 ===
- Chūka Ichiban (Mei Li, Shan, Pai)
- Slayers Try (Filia Ul Copt)

=== 1998 ===
- Cardcaptor Sakura (Sakura Kinomoto)

=== 1999 ===
- Digimon Adventure (Mimi Tachikawa, Agumon, Wizardmon)
- Magic User's Club (Nanaka Nakatomi)

=== 2000 ===
- Ceres, Celestial Legend (Aya Mikage, Ceres)
- Digimon Adventure 02 (Iori Hida, Jun Motomiya, Arukenimon, Mimi Tachikawa)
- Hamtaro (Hiroko Haruna)

=== 2001 ===
- A Little Snow Fairy Sugar (Saga Bergman)
- Fruits Basket (Tohru Honda)
- Mahoromatic (Mahoro Andou)
- Princess Comet (Princess Comet)

=== 2002 ===
- Duel Masters (Mimi Tasogare)
- RahXephon (Haruka Shitow)
- Shrine of the Morning Mist (Kurako Hieda)

=== 2003 ===
- Spheres (Teacher Joo Ah Ra, Ang Ga Ra)

=== 2004 ===
- Gankutsuou: The Count of Monte Cristo (Peppo, Victoria de Danglars)
- Ragnarok the Animation (Yuufa)
- Rozen Maiden (Nori Sakurada)
- School Rumble (Tenma Tsukamoto)
- Winx Club (Stella)

=== 2005 ===
- Animal Yokochō (Iyo, Shima Shimako, Ako Aomori)
- Rozen Maiden: Träumend (Nori Sakurada)
- SoltyRei (Solty Revant)

=== 2006 ===
- Kanon (Akiko Minase)
- School Rumble: Second Term (Tenma Tsukamoto)
- The Familiar of Zero (Louise)

=== 2007 ===
- Zero no Tsukaima: Futatsuki no Kishi (Louise)

=== 2013 ===
- Pretty Rhythm: Dear My Future (Mia Ageha)
- Love Live! (Hanayo Koizumi)

== Original video animation ==
- Kirameki☆Project (Kurone)
- Samurai X: Reflection (Kamiya Kaoru)
- School Rumble: Extra Class (Tenma Tsukamoto)

== Theatre anime ==
- Cardcaptor Sakura: The Movie (Sakura Kinomoto)
- Cardcaptor Sakura Movie 2: The Sealed Card (Sakura Kinomoto)
- Only Yesterday (Taeko Okajima)
- Samurai X: The Motion Picture (Kamiya Kaoru)
- Whisper of the Heart (Shizuku Tsukishima)
- You're Under Arrest: The Movie (Miyuki Kobayakawa)

== Web anime ==
- I'm Sorry, I Love You (Yoon Seo-kyung)
