= Yong-joon =

- Hangul: 용준
- RR: Yongjun
- MR: Yongjun

Yong-joon, also spelled Yong-jun, is a Korean given name.

People with this name include:

- Ahn Yong-joon (born 1987), South Korean actor
- Bae Yong-joon (born 1972), South Korean actor
- Jeong Yong-joon (born 1976), stage name Jang Hyuk, South Korean actor
- Kim Yong-joon (voice actor) (fl. 1990s), South Korean voice actor
- Kim Yong-jun (singer) (born 1984), South Korean singer
- Kwon Ryong-jun, coach of the North Korea national football team

== See also ==
- List of Korean given names
- Kim Yong-jun (footballer) (born 1983), North Korean footballer, whose name is spelled differently (김영준) in Hangul
