= Nam Doh-hyeong =

South Korean voice actor (born 1983)

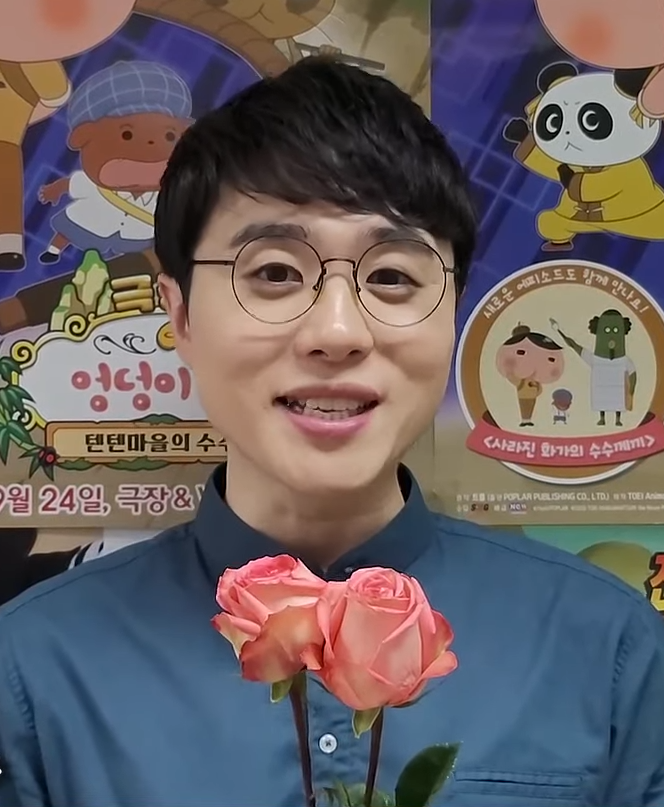
- Nam in 2020
- Born: 24 April 1983 (age 43); Gangneung, South Korea
- Education: Korea University; English language and literature
- Occupation: Voice actor
- Years active: 2006–present

Korean name
- Hangul: 남도형
- Hanja: 南度亨
- RR: Nam Dohyeong
- MR: Nam Tohyŏng

Nam Doh-hyeong (Korean: 남도형; born 24 April 1983) is a South Korean voice actor.

At the age of 23, he began working as a voice actor after joining Korean Broadcasting System's Voice Acting Division. Shortly after, he debuted with one of the supporting roles on the digital restoration of a 1976 South Korean animated film Robot Taekwon V. In 2003, before starting his career, Nam participated in dubbing of the action video game Mobile Suit Gundam: Encounters in Space. He voiced one of the soldiers and the pilots, as a winner of a game-related event at that time.

Nam has been a freelancer since 2009. One year later, he began receiving the attention of a wide public, with his role as Jamal Malik on the Korean dub of Slumdog Millionaire. His voice could be heard also in Sid the Science Kid, Animal Detective Kiruminzoo, The Hurt Locker, The Legend of the Legendary Heroes and The Greatest. Nam's breakout work was Fairy Tail. He made a big name for himself after voicing Natsu Dragneel in the Korean dubbed Japanese television animation series. In 2012, The Lorax became his first theatrical animated film to dub a leading role. He voiced Ted Wiggins on the Korean dub of the film.

Nam made his screen debut with the 2013 film No Breathing. In the early part of the film, he could be seen performing the role of a sports commentator.

Nam has become well known for his voicing Rory Williams on the Korean dub of a British science fiction television series Doctor Who, Dent on the Korean dub of Pokémon: Best Wishes!, Raf Esquivel and Knock Out on the Korean dub of Transformers: Prime, MrBeast on the Korean dub of MrBeast YouTube channels and more recently, Rigby on the Korean dub of an American animated television series Regular Show.

== Career ==
Year	Title	Role	Notes
2007	Robot Taekwon V (로보트 태권 V)	One of the supporting roles	This movie is the digital restoration of a 1976 film under the same title. It was South Korea's highest-grossing domestic animated film, drawing 720,000 viewers at that time until the record was broken by Leafie, A Hen into the Wild four years later.

Year	Title	Role	Notes
2025	Exorcism Chronicles: The Beginning (퇴마록)	Lee Hyeon-am	
2025	Your Letter (연의 편지)	Sean	

== Miscellaneous facts ==
- The ending title for the Korean dub of Transformers: Prime is based upon a video shot by Goo Ja-hyeong (South Korean voice actor), who dubbed Megatron on the show. The title aired only when the first season of the show ended. In this video, Nam appears for a moment, with a scene in which Raf Esquivel is running.

== See also ==
- Korean Broadcasting System
