= Your Letter (film) =

2024 South Korean animated film

- Theatrical release poster
- Hangul: 연의 편지
- RR: Yeonui pyeonji
- MR: Yŏnŭi p'yŏnji
- Directed by: Kim Yong-hwan
- Based on: Your Letter by Hyeon A Cho
- Starring: Lee Su-hyun; Kim Min-ju; Min Seung-woo; Nam Doh-hyeong
- Music by: Kim Tae-seong
- Production companies: Studio Lico; Studio N
- Distributed by: Lotte Entertainment
- Release dates: September 27, 2024 (OIAF); October 1, 2025 (South Korea)
- Running time: 96 minutes
- Country: South Korea
- Language: Korean
- Box office: US$1.4 million

Your Letter (Korean: 연의 편지) is a 2024 South Korean animated drama film directed by Kim Yong-hwan. Produced by Studio Lico and Studio N, the film is based on the manhwa Your Letter by Hyeon A Cho. The film stars the voices of Lee Su-hyun, Kim Min-ju, Min Seung-woo, and Nam Doh-hyeong.

== Voice cast ==
Character	Korean
Sori Lee	Lee Su-hyun
Eugene Park	Kim Min-ju
Yeon Jung	Min Seung-woo
Sean	Nam Doh-hyeong

== Production ==
In December 2018, it was reported that an animated feature film adaptation of Your Letter by Hyeon A Cho would be produced by Studio Lico and Studio N. Production began in 2019. The film was subsequently announced to be directed by Kim Yong-hwan and starring the voices of Lee Su-hyun, who also performed the film's soundtrack, Kim Min-ju, Min Seung-woo, and Nam Doh-hyeong. Kim Tae-seong composed the film's music.

== Release ==
In a 2022 interview, Studio N's content business leader Lee Hee-yoon stated that they hoped to release the film in Q3 2023. In April 2024, it was reported that the film was planned for release in Q3 2024. The film premiered at the 2024 Ottawa International Animation Festival on September 27, 2024. The film was subsequently screened at the 26th Bucheon International Animation Festival later that year and at the 18th Animator International Animated Film Festival in 2025. Distributed by Lotte Entertainment, the film was released in South Korean theaters on October 1, 2025.

The film was presold for release in 166 countries, with a release in North America initially scheduled for early 2026. Crunchyroll released the film in North American theaters on August 17, 2026, and it was later streamed on October 23.

== Reception ==
=== Box office ===
In its opening weekend, the film debuted at seventh place at the Korean box office, earning US$351,769 with 51,755 admissions. As of November 18, 2025, the film has grossed US$1,443,685.

=== Critical response ===
Sangmin Sung of IGN Korea praised the animation, particularly the use of colors, which he felt made the scenery realistic and movement fluid. He also liked how the animation helps to set the mood of the story, pointing out its use of darker colors and increased frame rate during tense scenes. However, he felt the voice acting was inconsistent between the different lead actors, though he offered praise to the soundtrack. He also felt that the transitions between different scenes were sometimes rushed. Lee Ja-yeon of Cine21 liked the way the narrative progressed throughout the film. Lee also liked the soundtrack. Kazuki Sunama, an anime producer at CoMix Wave Films who worked on Your Name and Suzume, liked the depiction of Korean landscapes and culture and felt the animation was well done. Sunama described it as "the most entertaining Korean animated film that I have seen in the past 20 years".

Jeong Yu-jin of News1 described the film as part of an "animated film boom" in South Korea in 2025, along with Exorcism Chronicles: The Beginning and KPop Demon Hunters.

=== Accolades ===
Award/Festival	Year	Category	Recipient(s)	Result	Ref.
Bucheon International Animation Festival	2024	Jury Prize for Feature Film	Your Letter	Won	
Bucheon International Animation Festival	2024	Cocomics Music Prize	Your Letter	Won	
Bucheon International Animation Festival	2024	Korea Animation Industry Association President's Prize for Technical Achievement	Your Letter	Won	
Baeksang Arts Awards	2026	Best New Director	Kim Yong-hwan	Nominated	
Harvey Awards	2026	Best Adaptation from Comic Book/Graphic Novel	Your Letter	Nominated	
