= Kang Soo-jin (voice actor) =

South Korean voice actor

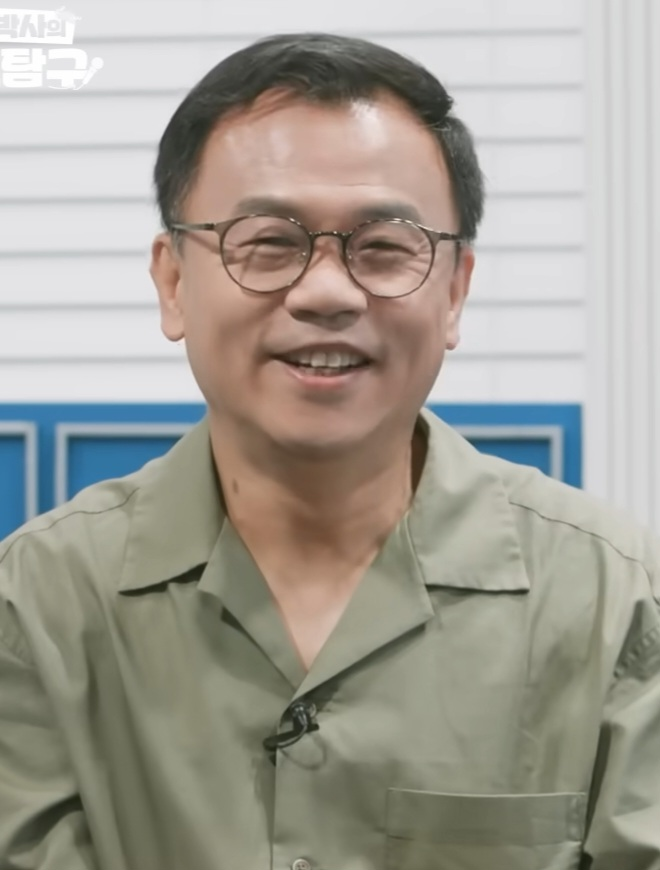
- Kang in 2023
- Born: October 19, 1965 (age 60); Seoul
- Occupation: Voice actor
- Years active: 1988–present

Korean name
- Hangul: 강수진
- RR: Gang Sujin
- MR: Kang Sujin

Kang Soo-jin (born October 19, 1965) is a South Korean voice actor who joined Korean Broadcasting System's voice acting division in 1998. He is best known for the roles of Artanis (StarCraft II: Legacy of the Void), Professor Moriarty (Sherlock), Inuyasha (Inuyasha), Dororo (Sgt. Frog), Dibo (Dibo The Gift Dragon), Jimmy/Shinichi Kudo (Case Closed/Detective Conan) and Monkey D. Luffy (One Piece). He also starred as Saeran Choi in the popular otome game Mystic Messenger. He also voiced the announcer for the 2020 Global StarCraft II League Season 3. He shares many roles with Japanese voice actor Kappei Yamaguchi.

== Career ==
=== Voice acting ===
==== Animated movie dubbing ====
- Aladdin (Aladdin)
- Agent Pleakley (Lilo & Stitch)
- Peter Pan (Peter Pan)

==== TV animation dubbing ====
- Hanamichi Sakuragi (Slam Dunk)
- Julian Star/Yukito Tsukishiro, Yue and Yoshiyuki Terada (Cardcaptor Sakura)
- Jimmy/Shinichi Kudo (Case Closed/Detective Conan)
- Dibo (Dibo The Gift Dragon)
- Goku (Dragon Ball Z)
- Inuyasha (Inuyasha)
- Aoi (Kero Kero Chime)
- Mickey Mouse (Mickey Mouse Clubhouse)
- Twenty (Numberblocks)
- Monkey D. Luffy (One Piece)
- Ranma Saotome (Ranma ½)
- Dororo (Sgt. Frog)
- Hajime Kindaichi (The Kindaichi Case Files)
- Yusuke Urameshi (Yu Yu Hakusho)
- Joey Wheeler/Katsuya Jonouuchi (Yu-Gi-Oh!)

==== Foreign TV show dubbing ====
- Frank Abagnale Jr. (Leonardo DiCaprio) (Catch Me If You Can)
- Amsterdam Vallon (Leonardo DiCaprio) (Gangs of New York)
- Romeo Montague (Leonardo DiCaprio) (Romeo + Juliet)
- Professor Moriarty (Sherlock)
- Jack Dawson (Leonardo DiCaprio) (Titanic)

==== Video game dubbing ====
- Shadow Milk Cookie (Cookie Run: Kingdom)
- Saeran Choi (Mystic Messenger)
- Artanis (StarCraft II: Legacy of the Void)

==== Audio drama dubbing ====
- Astor Basa Jehichant (Sound of Prince; The audio drama of the Oops! My Prince (How to Grow a Man : Turning Chumps to Hunks)
  - Sound of Prince ~The Acclaimed Morning Kiss~ (어이쿠! 왕자님 오디오 북 《사운드 오브 왕자님 ~호평받는 모닝키스~》)
  - Sound of Prince ~Non-linear Elegy~ (어이쿠! 왕자님 오디오 북 《사운드 오브 왕자님 ~비선형적 엘레지~》)
