= Mystic Messenger =

2016 video game

- Developer: Cheritz
- Publisher: Cheritz
- Platforms: Android iOS
- Release: July 8, 2016 (Android); August 18, 2016 (iOS)
- Genres: Romance; Chat fiction
- Mode: Single-player

Mystic Messenger (Korean: 수상한메신저; RR: Susanghan Mesinjeo, lit. 'Mysterious Messenger') is a South Korean otome game developed by Cheritz. It was released on July 8, 2016, for Android and August 18, 2016, for iOS. The game is described as a "storytelling messenger game" and is available in Korean, English, Spanish, and Mandarin Chinese.

== Plot ==
In Mystic Messenger, the player takes the role of a female character whose name is chosen by the player. The female protagonist downloads a mysterious app that leads her into living in either a closed, secured apartment owned by Rika, the founder of a charity organization known as the RFA (Rika's Fundraising Association), or the Mint Eye HQ. She meets the remaining members of the RFA and is tasked to organize a party by inviting guests. In Another Story, Unknown tricks the protagonist into playing the game and brings her to Mint Eye, keeping her by his side. The protagonist is able to choose one out of 7 available routes, each with their own backgrounds, as well as finding out the truth behind the RFA.

== Characters ==
The following Korean romanization follows the official romanization from the game itself; it may be different from the usual pronunciation.

Protagonist
She is often referred to as MC, which stands for Main Character. Her default avatar comes in 5 various appearances, but she appears to have brown, long silky hair and is drawn with her eyes hidden under bangs as shown in the CGs. After suddenly becoming a member of RFA and being forced to live in Rika's apartment, she takes Rika's role and organizes the party that the RFA members have been longing for. In the official webcomic adaptation, "Invitation of the Mystic Messenger", MC is given a new name, Hana Kang.

Jumin Han
Voiced by: Yongwoo Shin
Jumin Han (한주민, Han Ju-min) is a 27-year-old heir of C&R International, a company owned by his father. He has short black hair, grey eyes and is always on business trips, he likes to wear tuxedos, (Note: From the game's official guide book) and is not used to 'commoner' food. Jumin is a cat lover claiming that only cats understand and are loyal to him. He owns a Persian cat named Elizabeth the 3rd and hates when someone else nicknames her - especially 707, who gives her the nickname "Elly". Due to his very privileged upbringing, Jumin has a very different perspective on the world, which often brings him into direct conflict with Zen. Regardless, he doesn't particularly seem to care what others think about him but does not hesitate to use his authority to help RFA members when one of them is in trouble. He and V are childhood friends due to their family background and because of them being neighbors and schoolmates.

Zen
Voiced by: Jang Kim
Zen (stylized as ZEN) is the stage name of Hyun Ryu (류현, Ryu Hyeon), a 24-year-old musical stage artist. He has pale skin, red-brown colored eyes, and white-colored hair that is short at the front and long at the back, implying that he's an albino. Despite being a self-absorbed due to his looks, he wants people to acknowledge him for his skills and personality instead. Zen loves to workout and rehearse constantly to perfect his skills. He is seen to be oversensitive towards Jumin, nicknaming him "Mr. Trust Fund Kid" and refusing any help from him. He is allergic to cats, sneezing even when the word 'cat' is mentioned. Zen is also very protective of the other members, especially the protagonist, and always warned her to be wary of the guys and their 'wolf attitude'.
In Zen's storyline, it is revealed that he has a difficult relationship with his parents and that he left home at age 16 to pursue acting. He owns a motorbike kept in storage and was once rescued by V after an accident.
Zen's birthday is on April 1 and he became the focus in the game's April's Fools DLC.

707
Voiced by: Youngsun Kim
707, or his baptismal name Luciel Choi (최 루시엘, Choi Luciel) is a 22-year-old hacker and intelligence agent, he is also the one who made the RFA Messenger app. 707, also referred to as Seven, has short curly red hair, amber eyes and is a self-proclaimed devoted Catholic who loves to eat junk food. He has a very mischievous attitude and loves cats in a 'unique' way. His hobbies include collecting sports cars and hacking. Despite his seemingly carefree, easy-going personality, he always warns the other members to "keep their distance" from him because of his job as a secret agent. 707 tends to break the fourth wall more than anyone in the game.

Yoosung
Voiced by: Kyuhyuk Sim
Yoosung Kim (김유성, Kim Yu-seong) is a 21-year-old college student and an online gamer. He has violet colored eyes and blonde hair, initially brunette before he entered university. Due to his gaming habits, he doesn't have time for studying despite being smart enough to get a scholarship at his school, SKY University, and get an internship offer from Jumin. Yoosung is also Rika's adoptive cousin. He is unable to move on after her death, as he admired her even though they only met when he was a 6th grader.

Rika was Yoosung's biggest influence. Rika's death apparently hit him so hard that only playing LOLOL could distract him from his sadness. Due to this, he also initially compared the protagonist with Rika so much to the point that he would see her as Rika's replacement.

Jaehee Kang
Voiced by: Jeonghwa Yang
Jaehee Kang (강제희, Kang Jae-hee) is currently the only female member of RFA besides the protagonist. She is a 26-year-old Chief Assistant at C&R International and Jumin's personal assistant. She has brown pixie-cut styled hair, brown eyes and initially appeared as stoic, serious, and suspicious of the protagonist's sudden appearance. Despite this, she's a big fan of Zen, and her personality changes when she's talking about him. She tends to be overworked by Jumin and is forced to take care of Elizabeth the 3rd, even though she hates it when cat hair is all over her house. She is also forced to keep her hair short and wears glasses even though she has fine eyesight due to Jumin's policy. Her route is the only route that is not explicitly romantic.

V
Voiced by: Hosan Lee
V, whose real name is Jihyun Kim (김지현, Kim Ji-hyeon) is 27 years old, a childhood friend of Jumin and the leader of RFA. He was Rika's fiancé. V is very protective of his friends and would rather be put to blame or hide secrets from RFA to keep them from getting hurt. He does not appear in the messenger often and is often criticized for keeping too many secrets from RFA. He wears sunglasses to hide his eyes after getting into an accident where he began gradually losing his sight.
Initially being a side character, in September 2017 Cheritz released Another Story which allows the player to develop a relationship with V.

Rika
Voiced by: Hyunjin Lee
Rika (리카) is adored by RFA's members since the organization was founded by her and V, her ex-fiancee. She had severe mental issues from an early age caused by her dad leaving her and her mother committing suicide. Her mental issues worsened after her dog, Sally, wound up dead due to her blindness. It is later found out that Rika is not dead, but instead founded Mint Eye, a cult that is after RFA. She attempts to steal party guests from the RFA to invite to her new organization. She claims that she wants the entire world to be happy, and wishes for them to come to "Paradise". She works with Unknown in Mint Eye and is called Savior by her followers.
In Another Story, it appears that Rika may show interest in the main character. One of the Bad Ending route options allows the player to be with Rika.

Unknown / Saeran / Ray
Voiced by: Soo-jin Kang
Unknown (also referred to as '???' in the visual novel mode and 'Ray' in Another Story) is a hacker who led the protagonist into Rika's apartment and is part of a mysterious cult called "Mint Eye". He appears as an antagonist and causes most of the bad endings in the game.
Unknown's real name is Saeran and he is the twin brother of 707. He was the weaker of the twins and was often abused and locked up by their mother.
In Another Story, he is called Ray and appears to have a split personality who is referred to as Saeran. Ray lures the main character into Mint Eye under the premise of her testing a game, trying to convince her that people from the RFA are AIs and not real people. Saeran's personality is very aggressive, arrogant, and full of rage while Ray is very gentle, thoughtful, and clingy towards the main character, both have an unwavering loyalty towards Rika.
At the end of his route, his two personalities become one, and he is referred to as Saeran, although the MC can still choose to call him Ray.
Saeran also exhibits many traits of borderline personality disorder, such as a distorted sense of identity, frantic efforts to avoid abandonment, severe mood shifts, an intolerance for being alone, impulsive and self-damaging behavior, and an immediate and intense attachment to the MC. His voice actor Soo-jin Kang, who himself is diagnosed with borderline personality disorder, has interpreted Saeran as having the diagnosis as well, which he discusses in his Free Talk for Secret 02.

== Gameplay ==
The game plays in real time, where players can receive text messages and join the group chat in a special messenger. The story lasts for 11 days per route. The first day concerns the game's prologue, three days for the "common route", six days focusing on a route of a character, and one day for the party. Throughout conversations in the first four days, the player can give responses to certain characters to increase their likability with them, symbolized as hearts. Players encounter Cautions, events that branch the story and determines whether the player will get to continue the story or receive a bad ending depending on their accumulated hearts and chatroom participation. In the chatrooms, players can talk with characters and make decisions, which may affect a character's feelings towards the protagonist and ultimately their route.

== Reception ==
Critics praised Mystic Messenger for the sense of realism it produced. VG247 editor Caitlin Moore found the game's theme of isolation to reflect her own experiences with social distancing during the COVID-19 pandemic. Mystic Messenger surpassed 2.5 million downloads a year after the release.

In 2017, Mystic Messenger was awarded Best Indie Game at the 2017 Korea Game Awards.

== Others ==
=== Music ===
The game features two songs - the opening theme is sung by Han titled "Mysterious Messages" and ending song sung by Han and Sirius titled "Like the Sun in the Sky". Both are composed by DoubleTO.

About 23 tracks of background music, composed by Flaming Heart, were released along with the opening and ending song and 13 tracks of free talk with people involved in the making via the game's special package.

=== Official merchandise ===
In June 2016, Cheritz opened a pre-order session for the game's limited edition special package called RFA VIP Package. The package contains original soundtracks from the game, 2 artbooks, characters' name card, and 2 DVDs of the free talk session with the voice actors involved in the game. It also contains serial number to unlock the game's VIP membership, which enables players to fast-forward chatrooms, call the characters without limits, and gives in-game currency.

In July 2017, Cheritz released dakimakura covers for 707 and Jumin Han, who topped the popularity poll, for Mystic Messenger's first anniversary.

=== Official comic ===
"Invitation of the Mystic Messenger", the official webcomic adaptation was published on April 11, 2020. The prologue was published on April 3, 2020. This webcomic was written by GIMAN (기만), illustrated by meriG (멜쥐), and was published by BookCube. The webcomic is available in Korean, English, Indonesian, Thai, German, and French.
