= Spheres (TV series) =

- Genre: Animated television series
- Directed by: Byeon Yeong Kyoo
- Voices of: Yang Jeong Hwa; Kim Youngsun; Rhee Myeong Seon; Kim Hyo Seon; Choi Seok Pil; Woo Jeong Sin; Mun Seon Hui; Bak Yeong Hwa; Yoon Yeo Jin; Rhee Cheol Yong
- Country of origin: South Korea
- No. of episodes: 26

Production
- Executive producer: Kim Sin Hwa
- Producers: An Seong Eun; Kim Mi Ryeong; Cheon Chae Jeong
- Running time: 30 minutes
- Production company: Studio Kaab

Original release
- Network: MBC
- Release: July 30, 2003 – February 25, 2004

Spheres (Korean: 스피어즈) is a South Korean animated television series comprising 26 episodes, produced by Studio Kaab and first broadcast on MBC TV in 2003 and 2004.

The now-defunct Studio Kaab went on to animate the series Nalong, the flying squirrel from Spheres. In the Italian opening, Santo Verduci composed for the TV show Contactoons.

== Story ==
Unbeknownst to human history, the Kingdom of Spheres existed upon Earth long ago. The people of this kingdom would be regarded today as people with psychic powers. Unfortunately, like most other civilizations, as the gap widened more and more between the social classes, the Kingdom of Spheres was troubled by those greedy for power; and in the end it collapsed. Na Yeon is a mysterious girl who was found in the Antarctic after the destruction of Spheres. One day Asten, the chairman of Sphere Union, who has a burning ambition to control the world, sent his followers to keep watch on Na Yeon. Na Yeon and her friends try to keep three artifacts, the keys to conquer the world, from the hands of Sphere Union.

== Characters ==
Han Na Yeon (한나연)
Voiced by: Yang Jeong Hwa
She is the main protagonist of the story. She lives in a small village with her parents when she discovers her special talents. She believes that everything is possible to those who possess enough hope and faith. She uses Sphere Phoenix, which only she can control as she is the only remaining member of Ancient Spheres.
Principal An Il Hwan (안일환 교장선생님)
Voiced by: Park Young Hwa
The grandfather of Na Yeon, he is very gentle and never yells at children. He is very interested in the origin of Spheres. He built a school for geniuses on the site of the ancient Spheres kingdom, and in this school, he created a club called "New Spheres" in which only Sphere users can participate. He trains young Sphere users in this club. He believes that children have infinite possibilities.
Lee Ho Joon (이호준)
Voiced by: Lee Myeong Seon
He is a member of New Spheres. Both of his parents possess Spheres and he has the ambition to become the best of all the Spheres. He has the ability to use many types of power but his weak point is that he is not particularly skilled at any of them. He uses Sphere Storm, which reflects his personality clearly.
Jin (진)
Voiced by: Kim Youngsun
He is Asten's only son and a student at An Il Hwan's school. He works as a singer with Tilla as part of Sphere Union's plan. He meets Na Yeon while searching for the kid who the headmaster (An Il Hwan) took away. Jin looks more mature than most kids of his age and is the idol of every girl at the school. He is a polite man with a cold personality. He wears a tiger mask when he is on a mission for his father, in order to keep his cover as a spy. Later in the series, he abandons the Sphere Union. He uses Sphere Thunder, which is empowered by human technology.
Nalong (나롱이)
Voiced by: Rhee Myeong Seon
He is a little flying squirrel whose wings are not big enough to make him fly. He likes taking naps and eating chocolate balls. It seems that he can communicate with Na Yeon.
Gong Ju (공주)
Voiced by: Woo Jeong Shin
Tiosnia Uconio Visaer Princess. She claims to be the princess of Papaoh Kingdom, but nobody believes her. She uses Sphere Flower, which can detect dangers. (Note: "Gongju" is the Korean word for princess.)
Ria (리아)
Voiced by: Yoon Yeo Jin
She is the unofficial leader of New Spheres. She's taller than most people of her age. She was born in Canada but she had to move to Korea after causing an accident because of her uncontrollable powers. Although she cannot control her powers, she is quite clever and for this reason prefers to use her mind and her computer instead of her uncontrollable powers. She is also a game maniac. She uses Sphere Power Brain, which has the ability to find the weaknesses of an enemy.
Yoo Seo Dong (유서동)
Voiced by: Kim Hyo Seon
He is a member of New Spheres. He used to make predictions for the monks in a mountain temple until the abbot threw him out. He later realizes that predicting the future is dangerous. He uses Sphere Wind, which acts as a compass.
Tilla (틸라)
Voiced by: Lee Myeong Seon
Tilla is a female humanoid robot whose energy source is water. She existed before Jin was born. The relationship between Tilla and Jin is complex because she acts both as his mother and his female companion. Jin's attention towards Na Yeon makes her jealous.
Asten (아스텐)
Voiced by: Choi Seok Phil
The father of Jin, he collected the Sphere users from all over the world and made an entertainment company called "Sphere Union" to aid in his efforts to take over the world.
Teacher Joo Ah Ra (주아라 선생님)
Voiced by: Mun Seon Hui
She respects the headmaster who raised her. As his student, she is very skillful. She is founder of the New Spheres club and is also a self-described career advisor. Although she is an adult, she is very innocent and has a foolish side. She is a kind person who uses honorifics when addressing children.
Teacher Rhee Tae Baek (이태백 선생님)
Voiced by: Choi Seok Phil
King Kong (킹콩)
Voiced by: Choi Seok Phil
Na Yeon's Mother (나연 엄마)
Voiced by: Yoon Yeo Jin
Na Yeon's Father (나연 아빠)
Voiced by: Park Young Hwa
Tang Kong (땅콩)
Voiced by: Kim Hyo Seon

== Production staff ==
- Director: Byeon Yeong Kyoo
- Scenario: Kim Eun Ji, Studio Kaab
- Continuity: Byeon Yeong Kyoo, Kooji Aritomi, Katsuyuki Kodera, Kenichi Kawamura, Seo Seong Jong, Yoo Jae Woon, Rhee Choong Bok, Kim Keum Soo
- Character Design: Byeon Yeong Kyoo, Kim Keum Soo
- Art Consultants: Yeon Yeong Kyoo, Bak Hyo Jin, Bak Jong Min
- Art Board: Han Moon Joong, Kang Seung Chan
- Art Production Director: Kim Keum Soo
- Art Director: Han Moon Joong
- Scenario: Namoo Production
- Color Settings: Byeon Yeong Kyoo, Ko Il Joon, Kim Dae Hyeon
- Animation Checker: Lim Jong Yeol
- Animation: Monster Production
- Digital Color: Hanho Animation
- Digital Scan: DNA Production, Abram Enterprise
- Editing Output: Kim Yeong Ho
- Sound Director: Rhee In Kyoo
- Sound Assistant Director: Ko Kwang Hyeon
- Sound Effects: Live tone, Poly Sound
- Music Director: Kim Jun Seok
- Music Recording: MNFC
- Dubbing: Jo Jeong Ran
- Producer: An Seong Eun, Kim Mi Ryeong, Cheon Chae Jeong
- Executive Producer: Kim Sin Hwa

== See also ==
- Manhwa
- Culture of South Korea
