= Popopo =

1981–2013 South Korean television series

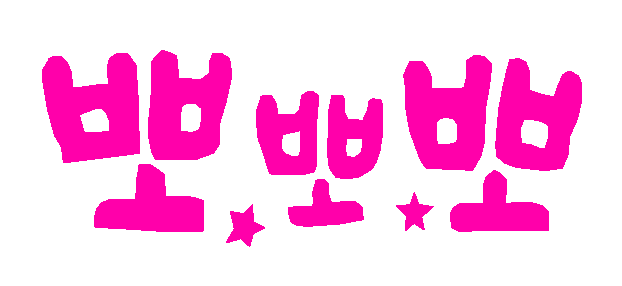
- The main logo used from 1981 to 2007
- Country of origin: South Korea
- Original languages: Korean; English
- No. of episodes: 7754

Original release
- Network: Munhwa Broadcasting Corporation
- Release: May 25, 1981 – August 7, 2013

Popopo (Korean: 뽀뽀뽀) is a South Korean children's television series broadcast on Munhwa Broadcasting Corporation (MBC). It was a popular children's education program, airing for 32 years with 7,754 episodes. It ran from May 25, 1981 to August 7, 2013. It was one of the leaders in Korean television education for young children, connecting parents and kids with its iconic theme song and promoting a sense of family and community.

During its time on air, Popopo has produced a total of 24 hosts, such as Wang Young-eun, Choi Yeo-jin, and Kang Da-som. The show has also aired over 40,000 children's songs, and its viewers have grown up to become parents themselves, passing on the show's legacy to the next generation.

Due to changing times and evolving education environments, MBC decided to end Popopo and introduced a new children's education program called "Ttok? Ttok! Kid's School" (똑?똑! 키즈스쿨), which aims to provide equal opportunities for young children to receive gifted education through television. The series was announced to have ended in 2013.
