= Molierissimo =

Molierissimo is a French animated television series in 26 25-minute episodes, produced by DIHR and broadcast October 1989 in Cabou Cadin 1 on Canal+. It was rebroadcast from 7 January 1992 in Amuse 3 on FR3. The series had 21 episodes (1 season).

== Synopsis ==
A young boy of ten named Quentin joins Molière's company and journeys with them through the kingdom of France.

== Episodes ==
- The mask and sword
- The children in the family
- The illustrious theater
- Medea dress
- The traveling theater
- The stunned
- The fight for Paris
- The Prince de Conti
- The removal
- The vagaries of a large
- Mr. King's brother
- The big day
- The La Grange book
- The precious ridiculous
- The mare
- The arrest
- The bombshell
- The Royal Palace Theatre
- Fugue
- Vaux le Vicomte
- Exile
- The robbers
- Night harlequins
- Two young drums
- Women's school
- The pleasures of the enchanted island

== Cast ==
- Claude Giraud: Molière
- Tania Torrens: Madeleine Béjart
- Damien Boisseau: Quentin
- François Chaumette: Bonaventure
- Albert Augier: Cardinal Mazarin
- Vincent Ropion: Louis XIV
- Danièle Douet: Genevieve Bejart
- Jean-Pierre Delage: Molière's Father
- Paul Bisciglia: Pouillard (sidekick Marchenoir)
- Maurice Sarfati: Narrator, The Chassieux (sidekick Marchenoir)
- Maria Tamar: Anne of Austria
- Jean-Pierre Leroux: Mr. King's brother
- Anne Jarry: Clarisse Marquise de St Julien
- Nicole Hiss: Louise Verville
- Régis Lang: Comte de Verville
- Jean-Luc Kayser: D'Artagnan (first voice), Cyrano de Bergerac (second voice)
- Michel Le Royer: Cyrano de Bergerac (first voice)
- Jean-Paul Solal: D'Artagnan (second voice)
- Patrick Prejean: Scaramouche
- Roger Carel: the head of the Court of Miracles
- Claude Rollet: Comte de Rambouillet

== Reception ==
Planète Jeunesse praised the series.
