= The Stuff of Legend =

Comic book series by Th3rd World Studios

Publication information
- Publisher: Th3rd World Studios
- Format: Limited series
- Genre: Fantasy
- Publication date: May 2009 – present
- No. of issues: 19

Creative team
- Written by: Mike Raicht; Brian Smith
- Artist: Charles Paul Wilson III
- Colorist(s): Jon Conkling; Michael DeVito

Collected editions
- Book 1: The Dark: ISBN 0-345-52100-5

The Stuff of Legend is a comic book series produced by Th3rd World Studios. The writers of The Stuff of Legend are Mike Raicht and Brian Smith. The illustrator is Charles Paul Wilson III.

== Publication history ==
The series is released as 56-page comic books, with Volume 1 a two-issue mini-series. A second volume of four issues, as well as a third, was announced in 2010.

Brian Smith, Charles Paul Wilson III, the guys at Th3rd World and Mike Raicht were planning on getting Volume 5 in 2015, and wrapping the series up with Volume 6. The first three issues of Volume 5 were published in 2017. The fourth issue of Volume 5 was published in September 2020. An in-house ad following the final page of that issue solicits the next volume, "The War." No further information was announced.

== Plot ==
The story takes place in 1944 Brooklyn. A band of toys goes on a journey into the Dark Realm to rescue a young boy, who is their owner, from the infamous Bogeyman. In the Dark Realm, which is inside the boy's closet, they change. They become life sized, with functional weapons and, in the teddy bear's case, teeth. As they venture into the Dark, they battle the Bogeyman's forces, composed mostly of bitter, lost toys, fallen under the fearful powers of their Dark master.

== Collected editions ==
The comics collected into trade paperbacks:

- Book 1: The Dark (collects Volume 1: The Dark, Issues 1 and 2, 128 pages, Villard Books, April 2010, ISBN 0-345-52100-5)
- Book 2: The Jungle (collects Volume 2: The Jungle, Issues 1 through 4, 144 pages, Th3rd World Studios, April 2011)
- Book 3: A Jester's Tale (collects Volume 3: A Jester's Tale, Issues 1 through 4, 124 pages, Th3rd World Studios, March 2012, ISBN 0-9832161-2-6)
- Book 4: The Toy Collector (collects Volume 4: The Toy Collector, Issues 1 through 5, 124 pages, Th3rd World Studios, August 2013)
- The Stuff of Legend: Omnibus One [Hardcover] (collects Volume 1: The Dark and Volume 2: The Jungle, 260 pages, Th3rd World Studios, July 2012, ISBN 0-9832161-9-3)
- The Stuff of Legend: Omnibus Two [Hardcover] (collects Volume 3: A Jester's Tale and Volume 4: The Toy Collector, 270 pages, Th3rd World Studios, February 2014, ISBN 0-9895744-9-0)

== Awards ==
In 2010, Wilson was nominated for the Russ Manning Most Promising Newcomer Award for his work on The Stuff of Legend.

== Possible film ==
According to Deadline, in 2012 Walt Disney Pictures made a pitch deal to make a film adaptation of the graphic novel with Pete Candeland to direct and Shawn Christensen writing the script; however, Christensen became unavailable and is no longer involved.

In his absence, Saw writers, Patrick Melton and Marcus Dunstan have been selected to adapt the series as a live-action film with David Hoberman and Todd Lieberman serving as producers under their Mandeville Films banner.
