= Studio Kaab =

South Korean entertainment company

Studio Kaab Inc. (Korean: 스튜디오 카브), headquartered in Gangnam-gu Seoul, Korea, was a major Korean aeni and entertainment company. The company is commonly referred to as "Kaab" (Korean Advanced Amusement Brand).

Studio Kaab also produced an anime review entertainment, Korea; as well as a Korean language version of Spheres animation and an animation called Nalong. It used to other animation, and featured storylines inappropriate for Clover 4/3, though not animated entertainment (see Anime).

Studio Kaab is confirmed to closed, but the generally-known date is 31 March 2018.

== Productions ==
- Clover 4/3 (2000)
- Spheres (2003)
- Nalong (2004)
- Nalong 2 (Nalong Season 2, 2006)
- Astronaut Family (2005)
- Levehavaf Empire (2006)
- Revbahaf: The Story of Rebuilding the Kingdom(2007)
- Giga Tribe (Tv Series 2008)
- Green Saver (Nalong Season 3, 2009)
- Paper Town (Scenario) (2012)
- Flower Boy, Hwarang (2014)

== See also ==
- Iconix Entertainment
- Contemporary culture of South Korea
- Korean animation
- List of South Korean companies
- SAMG Entertainment
