= Choi Han =

South Korean voice actor

- Hangul: 최한
- RR: Choe Han
- MR: Ch'oe Han

Choi Han is a South Korean voice actor who joined the Munhwa Broadcasting Corporation's Voice Acting Division in 1999. He voices David Hodges in the Korea TV Edition of CSI: Crime Scene Investigation replacing Wallace Langham. He won Best TV Voice Actor at the 2009 MBC Drama Awards for CSI: Crime Scene Investigation.

== Roles ==
=== Broadcast TV ===
- The Haunted House (Tooniverse original network) – Choi Min-hwan
- Spider-Man (Korea TV Edition, MBC)
- CSI: Crime Scene Investigation (replacing Wallace Langham, Korea TV Edition, MBC)
- Nalong (Nalong: Fly to the Sky) (MBC)
- Nalong 2 (Longman: The Little Big Hero) (MBC)
- Maxman (KBS)
- Mr. Bogus (Korea Edition) - Additional Voices
- Ojamajo Doremi (Korea TV Edition, MBC)
- Bikkuriman (Korea TV Edition, MBC)
- Atlantis Prince (MBC)
- Submarine 707 (MBC)
- Tommy & Oscar (Korea TV Edition, MBC)
- Widget (Korea TV Edition) – Elder#1, Additional Voices

=== Film dubbing ===
- The Funeral (replacing Benicio Del Toro, Korea TV Edition, MBC)
- After the Sunset (replacing Woody Harrelson, Korea TV Edition, MBC)
- Chicago (replacing John C. Reilly, Korea TV Edition, MBC)
- Master and Commander: The Far Side of the World (replacing Paul Bettany, Korea TV Edition, MBC)
- Exorcism Chronicles: The Beginning as Priest Father Park

=== Video games ===
- James Raynor, Viking in StarCraft II: Wings of Liberty
- Announcer of Super Smash Bros. Brawl
- Dainsleif in Genshin Impact
- Tea Knight Cookie in Cookie Run: Kingdom
- Lee in Arknights
- Gregor in Limbus Company
- Sol Badguy in Guilty Gear Strive
- Custos in Vampire: The Masquerade - Bloodhunt (Korean version)
- Omen in Valorant
- Narrated the Narin trailer in Warframe

== See also ==
- Munhwa Broadcasting Corporation
- MBC Voice Acting Division
