= Girls' Generation's Horror Movie Factory =

- Genre: Variety
- Developed by: MBC
- Presented by: MBC
- Starring: Girls' Generation; Kim Shin-young; Jo Hye-ryun; Yoo Se-yoon
- Country of origin: South Korea
- Original language: Korean
- No. of episodes: 6

Production
- Production locations: Seoul, South Korea
- Camera setup: Multi-camera
- Running time: 50 minutes

Original release
- Release: May 3 – June 14, 2009

Girls' Generation's Horror Movie Factory (Korean: 소녀시대의 공포영화 제작소), commonly abbreviated to "H.M.F", is an MBC variety TV show starring the South Korean girl group Girls' Generation. The members (excluding Yoona who was not present during filming due to filming of her drama Cinderella Man) undergo various acting lessons and tests. The show started out with horror settings, but after a few episodes became more bright and cheerful.

== Background ==
After the cancellation of the show Dae-mang (대망), Horror Movie Factory was introduced as MBC's new Sunday Sunday Night program alongside Quiz Prince (퀴즈프린스) in early May. A press conference was held at the MBC Dream Center in Ilsan, Gyeonggi Province to announce the new show. The show revolves around the members of Girls' Generation going through acting exercises and games under the instruction of comedians Kim Shin-young, Jo Hye-Ryun and Yoo Se-yoon, who are the 3 MCs on the show. The first 3 episodes revolve around the members in a haunted-school horror film-like acting test, while the last 3 show the members receiving direct instruction from actor Lee Bumsoo. The show premiered on May 3, 2009.

== Episodes ==
Episode	Broadcast Date	Episode Summary
01	May 3, 2009	The other group members set up a hidden-camera prank to trick Taeyeon. Tiffany, Jessica, Seohyun and Sunny are sent on a mission in the garden of a supposed 'haunted house' and run back screaming, having rehearsed earlier. Taeyeon, Sooyoung, Hyoyeon and Yuri as well as a well-known spiritual expert enter the haunted house, where Yuri proceeds to act as if she is possessed by the ghost of a young child. Taeyeon is made to participate in several rituals that will 'exorcise' the ghost.
02	May 10, 2009	The girls and MCs meet up at the set at a school building and pair up to have pillow fights, as an emotion exercise. The first pair are Taeyeon and Sunny who fight over their height. Tiffany and Seohyun are the second pair; Tiffany goads Seohyun but fails to make her angry. Sooyoung, Seohyun and Taeyeon then do weather forecasts while portraying different emotions or characters. Tiffany and Jessica are sent to do a horror acting test in a science lab, while Taeyeon and Sunny, then Sooyoung and Seohyun undergo horror tests in the arts classroom.
03	May 17, 2009	The girls split into two groups and compete by trying to make their opposition laugh by making funny expressions. They then practice their character immersion and improvisation skills by acting out several scenarios. Taeyeon, Sunny and Sooyoung then separately act out scenarios in a haunted school infirmary setting; Sooyoung is selected by the MCs as the best performer of the night.
04	May 31, 2009	Lee Bumsoo joins the show. He sits unseen in the bus as the Girls' Generation members are driven to the filming location and talk about him. The girls go to a supermarket where they choose gifts to buy for Lee Bumsoo, splitting into a short group and tall group. The haunted school setting from the previous episodes is replaced with an outdoor setting at a park and a bright indoor set. Several members then have one on one acting lessons with the actor.
05	June 7, 2009	The Girls' Generation members have an outdoor game session, competing in several ways such as limbo and doing the splits. Several members have one on one acting lessons with Lee Bumsoo, acting out different scenarios. Lee Bumsoo chooses Hyoyeon as the Top Actress of the day.
06	June 14, 2009	The members have a ssireum (Korean wrestling) match, play a modified version of American football and fight while wearing large body-suits. The members then have to re-enact a scenes from movies or dramas while under different circumstances or interpreted in different ways. Lee Bumsoo chooses Sunny as best performer of the 5 winners.

== Ratings ==
Despite the popularity of Girls' Generation, the show was unable to raise the ratings of MBC's Sunday Sunday Night segment, and was canceled after 6 episodes for receiving low viewership. The premiere episode had ratings of 3.3%. The show was then replaced with another show starring Girls' Generation titled Himnae-ra-him!/Cheer Up!
