= Himnaera Him! =

- Also known as: Girls' Generation's Himnaera Him!
- Genre: Reality
- Presented by: Kim Yong-man, Shin Jung-hwan, Boom
- Starring: Girls' Generation
- Country of origin: South Korea
- Original language: Korean
- No. of seasons: 1
- No. of episodes: 2

Production
- Production locations: Seoul, South Korea
- Camera setup: Multi-camera
- Running time: approx. 38 minutes per episode
- Production company: MBC

Original release
- Network: MBC TV
- Release: June 21 – June 28, 2009

Girls' Generation's Himnaera Him! (Korean: 소녀시대의 힘내라 힘!; lit. Girls' Generation's Cheer Up!), is a South Korean television reality show starring the South Korean girl group Girls' Generation. The show and cast operated under the goal of being the Republic of Korea's cheering squad, with the intention of cheering up the citizens during an economic slump.

== Background ==
After the cancellation of the MBC Sunday Sunday Night program Daemang (대망), it was replaced by a new variety show starring Girls' Generation titled "Girls' Generation's Horror Movie Factory" (소녀시대의 공포 영화 제작소). This show too however, was unable to raise the ratings of the MBC corner and was cancelled after a 6-episode run. It was announced that a new show starring the popular group titled 'Himnaera-Him!' or 'Cheer Up!' was chosen to take the timeslot, and began airing the week after the last episode of Horror Movie Factory. However, as the group released their new EP 'Tell Me Your Wish (Genie)' and became busier with promotions, the show was discontinued after only 2 episodes when the group's management decided to have them leave the MBC Sunday Sunday Night segment. On the broadcast date of the final episode of Cheer Up!, it was announced the group would be starring in a new reality show on KBS rather than MBC, titled Girls' Generation's Hello Baby, for which the group received a much more positive reaction than anything previously done on MBC's Sunday Sunday Night segment.

== Overview ==
=== Episode 1 ===
In this episode, the Girls' Generation members (excluding Yoona) along with the MCs of the show meet up and introduce the concept of the show at the MBC Dream Center, calling themselves the Republic of Korea's civil cheering squad. The cast then head to a bus rigged with cctv monitors hooked up to a tiny camera installed in a pair of sunglasses, as well as a few hand-held cameras. The first half of the show consists of the members pretending to be normal civilians and infiltrating different restaurants and ordering samgyeopsal, and trying to weigh the meat on a hidden scale without being caught. The goal is to find an honest store that gives the correct amount of meat for the paid price. The second part of the episode has the members splitting into teams and helping promote the honest stores as a competition to see which group can generate the most profit.

=== Episode 2 ===
The second and last episode of the show revolves around a widowed Environment Maintenance Worker in Songpa-dong named Lee Hyesuk. A friend of Lee named Jung Kyusoon cooperates with the Cheer Up! production team and helps them in helping keep the set up a secret. Girls' Generation members Tiffany, Taeyeon and Sooyoung pose as workers at a restaurant where comedian Kim Shinyoung is acting as the manager while Jessica and Shin Junghwan act as customers. Jung Kyusoon is able to convince Lee Hyesuk to enter the store, after which she wins several "hit-or-miss" draws that allow her to eat for free and receive special prizes, not knowing that it has been set up so that it is impossible for her to lose. Afterward she attends a street event performed by Boom, Yuri, Hyoyeon, Seohyun and Sunny, where she wins prizes after answering quiz questions, although it has been set up so that she will win despite what she answers. The MCs have a meet up with Lee Hyesuk at the end of the show, at which the Girls' Generation members are finally able to introduce themselves properly to the woman and give her one last gift.
