= Nalong 2 =

South Korean animated television series

- Hangul: 쾌걸롱맨 나롱이
- RR: Kwaegeollongmaen Narongi
- MR: K'waegŏllongmaen Narongi
- Starring: Kim Seo-yeong
- Country of origin: South Korea
- No. of episodes: 52

Production
- Running time: 15 min.

Original release
- Network: MBC
- Release: January 13, 2006 – March 9, 2007

Nalong 2 (Korean: 쾌걸롱맨 나롱이) is another South Korean animated series, also known by the name Longman, the Little Big Hero. It is a product of the major anime broadcaster Munhwa Broadcasting Corporation, and the animation was done by the now defunct Studio Kaab. The story centers on the animal and hero character Nalong, a world hero fighter squirrel.

== Characters ==
The central characters of Nalong 2's Family are:

Nalong, Longman, Nalong's father (Dalbong), Achangna, Kaka, Headingman, 10 Brothers, Panji, Panji's father, Hobi, Tori, Riri, Ukkya, Ukkya's mother, Ukkya's father, Sungsung, Sungsung's mother, Tajori, Tajori's mother, Tajori's father, Penguil, and the Prizia.

== Production Staff ==
- Creator: Lee Byeong Deok
- Make Producer: Kim Sin Hwa, Choi Ka Hee
- Character Design: Jo Yeon Joo, Lee Jeong Min, Bak So Jeong
- Key Animater: Lee Seok In, Lee Jeong Min
- Set Director: Kim Hae Seong
- Camera Director: Kim Yeong Ho
- Sound Director: Ko Kwang Hyeon
- Director: Yoo Jae Woon
- Producers: Choi Ka Hee, An Seong Eun
- Art Director: Kim Hae Seong
- Scenario: Hwang Seok Yeon
- Continuity: Kooji Aritomi
- Marketing: Kim Sin Hwa
- Art Control: Yoo Jae Woon, Lee Jeong Min
- Art Board: Kim Hae Seong
- Color Deposit: Jo Yeon Joo
- Original Picture: Lee Seok in, Yoo Jae Woon, Lee Jeong Min, Kim Je Hyeong
- Coloring Camera: Hoho Studio, Kim Yeong Ho, Kim Soo Kyeong, Lim Hyeon Hee, Moon Jeong In
- Opening Maker: Gerilla Media
- Ending Maker: Choi Ka Hee
- Master Edit: Toy Media, Kim Min Ho, Ban Seung Joon
- Record Director: Jo Jeong Ran
- Sound Director: Meca Studio, Ko Kwang Hyeon
- Sound Design: Meca Studio Lee Kyoo Beom, Lee Jae Heung, Jeong Seung Hyeon
- Music: Lee Jong Kyo
- Animate: Hwang Soo Jin, Lee Eun Sil, Jeong Yeong Hee, Yoo Soo Ok
- Online Advertise: An Sook Won
- Creative Producer: An Seong Eun
- Executive Producer: Kim Sin Hwa
- Network: Film & Line, Meca Studio, Toy Media
- Business Networks: Iconix Entertainment, Wiz Entertainment, Zero One Pictures, Ani Cast
- Broadcaster:Munhwa Broadcasting Corporation, On media (Tooniverse)

== Music ==
- Opening Theme: Longman, the Little Big Hero (정의의 쾌걸롱맨)
- Ending Theme: The Achangna (아짱나님이시다)
- Music Composer: Studio Kaab
- Song Composer: Lee Jong Kyo
- Singer: Kim Mi Jeong

== Voice actors ==
- Nalong: Kim Seo Yeong
- Sungsung: Kim Youngsun
- Ukkya, Tori: Wooh Jeong Sin
- Achangna: Han Chae Eon
- Prizia, Hobi, Riri: Ryoo Jeom Hee
- Penguil: Rhee Cheol Yong
- Nalong's father (Dalbong), Headingman: Choi Han
- Panji, Tajori, Ukkya's mother: Yeo Min-jeong
- Kaka: Um Sang-hyun

== See also ==
- Nalong - Nalong Season 1
