= Kim Yeong-jun (volleyball) =

South Korean volleyball player (born 1940)

Personal information
- Nationality: South Korean
- Born: 31 August 1940 (age 84)

Sport
- Sport: Volleyball

Kim Yeong-jun (born 31 August 1940) is a South Korean volleyball player. He competed in the men's tournament at the 1964 Summer Olympics.
