= Bak So-ra =

South Korean voice actress

Bak So-ra (Korean: 박소라) is a South Korean voice actress who joined the Munhwa Broadcasting Corporation's voice acting division in 1995.

== Roles ==
=== Broadcast TV ===
- Futari wa Pretty Cure (Korea TV Edition, Taeyoung SBS)
- Futari wa Pretty Cure Max Heart (Korea TV Edition, CHAMP TV and ANIONE TV)
- Ojamajo Doremi (Magical Remi from 1st - 3rd Series, Korea TV Edition, Munhwa Broadcasting Corporation and 4th series, Korea TV Edition, Tooniverse Cartoon Network)
- Buffy the Vampire Slayer (replacing Alyson Hannigan, Korea TV Edition, Munhwa Broadcasting Corporation)
- Shadow Fighter (Munhwa Broadcasting Corporation)
- Aqua Kids (Taeyoung SBS)
- Olympus Guardian - The Myth of Greece and Rome (Taeyoung SBS)
- Dr. Slump (Korea TV Edition, Munhwa Broadcasting Corporation)
- Adventure King's Gulliver (Korea TV Edition, Munhwa Broadcasting Corporation)
- Noah's Children (Korea TV Edition, Munhwa Broadcasting Corporation)
- Iwoot (Radio Drama, Munhwa Broadcasting Corporation)
- Cartoon Fight (Radio Drama, Munhwa Broadcasting Corporation)
- Very Special Morning (narration, Munhwa Broadcasting Corporation)
- Wa E-Nice World (narration, Munhwa Broadcasting Corporation)

=== Film dubbing ===
- Vanilla Sky (replacing Penélope Cruz, Korea TV Edition, Munhwa Broadcasting Corporation)
- I Am Sam (replacing Dakota Fanning, Korea TV Edition, Munhwa Broadcasting Corporation)
- The Butterfly Effect (replacing Irene Gorovaia, Korea TV Edition, Munhwa Broadcasting Corporation)
- Blade (Korea TV Edition, Munhwa Broadcasting Corporation)
- Taekeukkwon 2 (Korea TV Edition, Munhwa Broadcasting Corporation)
- 007 Series (Korea TV Edition, Munhwa Broadcasting Corporation)
- Only You (Korea TV Edition, Munhwa Broadcasting Corporation)
- Samurai Fiction (replacing Tamaki Ogawa, Korea TV Edition, Munhwa Broadcasting Corporation)
- Mad Max (replacing Joanne Samuel, Korea TV Edition, Taeyoung SBS)
- After the Sunset (replacing Salma Hayek, Korea TV Edition, Munhwa Broadcasting Corporation)

== See also ==
- Munhwa Broadcasting Corporation
- MBC Voice Acting Division
