= Exorcism Chronicles: The Beginning =

2024 South Korean animated film

- Theatrical release poster
- Hangul: 퇴마록
- RR: Toemarok
- MR: T'oemarok
- Directed by: Kim Dong-chul
- Written by: Lee Dong-ha
- Based on: Toemarok by Lee Woo-hyeok
- Starring: Choi Han; Nam Doh-hyeong; Jung Yoo-jung; Kim Yeon-woo
- Production company: Locus Animation Studios
- Distributed by: Showbox (South Korea); Viva Pictures (United States)
- Release dates: June 13, 2024 (Annecy); February 21, 2025 (South Korea); October 17, 2025 (United States)
- Running time: 85 minutes
- Country: South Korea
- Language: Korean
- Box office: US$3.3 million

Exorcism Chronicles: The Beginning (Korean: 퇴마록; RR: Toemarok) is a 2024 South Korean adult animated supernatural action film directed by Kim Dong-chul. Produced by Locus Animation Studios, the film is based on the novel Toemarok by Lee Woo-hyeok. The film stars the voices of Choi Han, Nam Doh-hyeong, Jung Yoo-jung, and Kim Yeon-woo.

== Voice cast ==
Character	Korean	English
Park Woon-gyu	Choi Han	Cory Yee
Lee Hyeon-am	Nam Doh-hyeong	Adam Lau
Jang Jun-hoo	Jung Yoo-jung	Kana Shimanuki
Hyun Seung-hee	Kim Yeon-woo	Amber Faith
Jang		Ammon Nelson
Byeokgong		Christopher W JOnes
Eulryeon		Joie Shettler
Heoheoja		Dietrich Gray
Maga		Sean Burgos
Seo		Dexter Wite
Master Dohye	Jung Yoo-jung	Susan Edwards
Astaroth		Frank Tadoro
Seunghyeon		Shannon O'Brien

== Production ==
The film was produced over a six-year period by a team of 680 individuals. Its story focuses on adapting the first chapter of the first volume of Toemarok (lit. 'A Record of Exorcism'), with the team wanting to emphasize the bond between the four lead characters. Real natural landscapes and buildings were used as the basis for animating the setting. The team deliberately excluded the use of artificial intelligence during the film's production.

The film was directed by Kim Dong-chul, with animation produced by Locus Animation Studios. It stars the voices of Choi Han, Nam Doh-hyeong, Jung Yoo-jung, and Kim Yeon-woo. The film's ending theme song is "Beastmode", performed by Monsta X.

== Release ==
The film premiered at the 2024 Annecy International Animation Film Festival in June and the 57th Sitges Film Festival later that year. The film, distributed by Showbox, premiered in South Korean theaters on February 21, 2025.

Finecut began shopping the film to international distributors at the 2024 European Film Market. Just prior to the 2025 European Film Market, Finecut announced distribution deals for Europe, Latin America, Southeast Asia, and Japan. The film was also sold for release in North America. Viva Pictures released the film in American theaters on October 17, 2025.

== Reception ==
=== Box office ===
In its opening weekend, the film debuted at second place at the Korean box office, earning US$739,664 with 108,090 admissions. As of October 12, 2025, the film has grossed US$3,318,022.

=== Critical response ===
Moon Ki-hoon of The Korea Herald liked the action scenes and felt they had a good balance of dialogue and action; he also felt the voice acting in those scenes was great. Moon generally liked the animation, though he also felt that it "hits some frame drops here and there". Moon felt the world-building was rushed and that some of the plot lines were not given enough screen time. Sangmin Sung of IGN Korea liked the story, voice acting, and animation, though he wished the animation had more detail in some scenes.
