= Kim Ah-yeong =

Korean voice actor (born 1972)

Kim Ah Yeong (Korean: 김아영) (born 1972) is a Korean voice actor. She joined the Munhwa Broadcasting Corporation's voice acting division in 1997.

== Roles ==
=== Broadcast TV ===
- CSI: Miami (replacing Emily Procter, Korea TV Edition, MBC)
- Smallville (replacing Kristin Kreuk, Korea TV Edition, MBC)
- Magic Fantasy Choiyooki (Korea TV Edition, AniOne)
- Ojamajo Doremi (Korea TV Edition, MBC)
- Sorcerer Hunters (Korea TV Edition, MBC)
- Bumperking Zapper (SBS)
- Bumerang Fighter (Bikkuriman, Korea TV Edition, MBC)
- Shaman King (Korea TV Edition, AniOne)
- Winx Club (SBS) - Tecna

=== Film dubbing ===
- X-Men (replacing Anna Paquin, Korea TV Edition, MBC)

== See also ==
- Munhwa Broadcasting Corporation
- MBC Voice Acting Division
