= Kim Seo-yeong =

South Korean voice actor

Kim Seo-Young
- 김서영
- Born: 19 January 1977 (age 49); Seoul, South Korea
- Occupation: Voice actress

Kim Seo-yeong (Korean: 김서영; born January 19, 1977) is a South Korean voice artist who started her career in 1999 at Munhwa Broadcasting Corporation, as an in-house voice artist. In 2002, she received attention in the South Korean entertainment district for her voice acting skills.

She has dubbed several main characters in mainstream animation and movies.

== Career ==
=== TV commercial voice-over ===
Kim performed over 1,000 TV commercials annually and over 10,000 pieces of work have been broadcast so far.

== Awards ==
- (2014) MBC Drama Awards : Consolation Medal
- (2004) Seoul International Cartoon and Animation Festival (SICAF) : Animation Consolation Medal

== Portfolio ==
=== Dubbing ===
==== Film ====
- (1993) The Heroic Trio - Chat by Maggie Cheung
- (2000) Charlie's Angels - Alex Munday by Lucy Liu
- (2001) Harry Potter and the Philosopher's Stone - Ronald Weasley by Rupert Grint
- (2001) Shallow Hal - Rosemary by Gwyneth Paltrow
- (2001) Lord of the Rings - Eowyn by Miranda Otto
- (2002) Harry Potter and the Chamber of Secrets - Ronald Weasley by Rupert Grint
- (2002) The Bourne Identity - Marie Kreutz by Franka Potente
- (2004) Crying Out Love, in the Centre of the World - Aki Hirose by Masami Nagasawa
- (2006) Hula Girls - Sanae by Yū Aoi
- (2008) WALL-E - Eve
- (2010) Despicable Me - Agnes
- (2010) How to Train Your Dragon - Astrid
- (2013) Despicable Me 2 - Agnes
- (2014) How to Train Your Dragon 2 - Astrid
- (2017) Beauty and the Beast - Belle (Emma Watson)
- (2017) Despicable Me 3 - Agnes
- (2017) Smurfs: The Lost Village - Smurfette
- (2017) The Emoji Movie - Jailbreak
- (2017) Desert of No Return

==== TV series ====
- (China) Legend of Lu Zhen - Lu Zhen by Zhao Liying
- (USA) Prison Break - Maricruz Delgado by Camille Guaty
- (USA) CSI: NY Season 4, 5 - Detective Jessica Angell by Emmanuelle Vaugier
- (USA) 24 - Kimberly Bauer by Elisha Cuthbert
- (USA) Smallville - Chloe Sullivan by Allison Mack

==== Animation ====
- (Japan) Doraemon - Doraemon
- (Japan) Bonobono - Bonobono
- (Japan) Dr. Shyne Evangelista - Arale
- (Japan) PriPara - Falulu, Jururu, Unicorn
- (Japan) The Boy and The Beast - Kyuta
- (Japan) Your Lie in April - Tsubaki
- (Japan) Haikyu!! Talent and Sense - Hitoka Yachi
- (Japan) Haikyu!! Concept no Tatakai - Hitoka Yachi
- (Japan) Junji Ito Collection - Tomie
- (Japan) Kaleido Star - Sora Naegino
- (Japan) Tamako Market - Kanna Makino
- (Japan) Sgt. Frog Keroro - Seol-hwa Kwon
- (Japan) Fresh Pretty Cure! - Love Momozono/Cure Peach
- (South Korea) Nalong/Nalong 2 - Nalong

==== Game character ====
- Dota 2 - Announcer
- Dungeon Fighter Online - Knight
- Mushiking - Popo
- Halo
- Heroes of the storm - Brightwing, Faerie Dragon
- Star Craft 2 - Banshee
- Honkai: Star Rail - Herta

==== Electronic device ====
- BMW Navigation
- LG cell phone

=== Discography ===
==== Animation OST ====
- Kaleido Star
- Daniel Tiger's Neighbourhood
- Daniel Tiger's Neighbourhood
- Dr. Slump ending song "You are Here, I am Here"
- The Backyardigans opening / ending song
- Best Student Council opening song "Let's Love Girls"
- Best Student Council ending song " Accidental Angel"
- Naughty Ninja Tori opening song
- Love Is Love opening song "Blooming Cherry Blossom"
- Love Is Love final ending song "Starting Point"
- Tsurupika Hagemaru opening song
- Kaleido Star ending song "Real Identity"
- Teen Titans opening song
- Fruits Basket Ep16 "The Fall Song"
- Bean and Wari opening song

=== Filmography ===
(2015) MBC Infinite Challenge : Ep.447 The film of the Weekend - Begin Again dubbing for Violet

=== On-stage ===
==== Concert MC ====
(2017) November Rain - The November love story told by voice artist Seo-young Kim (Collaboration of Japanese animation with Jazz)

(2017) Classic detox concert with voice artist Seo-young Kim MC

(2017) Orchestra story telling with Musical actor Kai and MBC voice artist Seo-young Kim MC : Seo-san, Ul-san, Ga-pyeong, Busan National Tour

==== Theater ====
(2001) Eugène Ionesco The Lesson - Main student

== See also ==
- Munhwa Broadcasting Corporation
- MBC Voice Acting Division
