= Kim Yong-joon (voice actor) =

South Korean voice actor

Kim Yong-joon (Korean: 김용준) is a South Korean voice actor who joined the Munhwa Broadcasting Corporation's Voice Acting Division in 1997. Currently, he is cast in the Korea TV Edition of "CSI: Crime Scene Investigation" as Al Robbins, replacing Robert David Hall.

== Roles ==
=== Broadcast TV ===
- CSI: Crime Scene Investigation (replacing Robert David Hall, Korea TV Edition, MBC)
- Shadow Fighter (MBC)
- 24 (extra guest, Korea TV Edition, MBC)
- Dr. Slump (Korea TV Edition, MBC)
- Pipi (Korea TV Edition, MBC)
- Bumerang Fighter (MBC)
- Bittle Juice (Korea TV Edition, MBC)
- Crayon Shin-chan (Movie of Korea TV Edition, MBC)
- Tommy & Oscar (Korea TV Edition, MBC)
- Cartoon Fight-Raviham Polis (radio drama, MBC)
- Cartoon Fight-Red Moon (radio drama, MBC)
- Cartoon Fight-Samkookji (radio drama, MBC)
- Dolphin Plliper (Korea TV Edition, MBC)
- Tom and Jerry (Korea TV Edition, MBC)
- Wa! e-Nice World (narration, MBC)

== See also ==
- Munhwa Broadcasting Corporation
- MBC Voice Acting Division
