= Nalong =

South Korean animated television series

- Hangul: 뚜루뚜루뚜 나롱이
- RR: Tturutturuttu Narongi
- MR: Tturutturuttu Narongi
- Starring: Kim Seo-yeong
- Country of origin: South Korea
- Original languages: English; Korean
- No. of episodes: 52

Production
- Running time: 15 minutes

Original release
- Network: MBC
- Release: December 24, 2004 – January 6, 2006

Nalong (Korean: 뚜루뚜루뚜 나롱이) is a South Korean animated series, also known by the name Nalong, Fly to the Sky. The 52-episode sitcom was broadcast by MBC TV in 2004. The animation was done by the now-defunct Studio Kaab. The story centers on the animal character Nalong, a flying squirrel.

== Story ==
Somewhere in this world, there is a town named Lala in a forest called Lulu. This is the home of Nalong and many other furry little creatures.

Nalong lives with his father and 10 brothers, and attends elementary school. His friends are an otter named Ukkya, an ostrich named Tajori, and the Mandu brothers, who were accidentally made by the famous inventor Professor Penguil.

== Characters ==
The central characters of Nalong's Family are:

Nalong, Nalong's father (Dalbong), 10 Brothers, Blue Eagle, Panji, Panji's father, Hobi, Tori, Riri, Ukkya, Ukkya's mother, Ukkya's father, Sungsung, Sungsung's mother, Tajori, Tajori's mother, Tajori's father, Ujuin, Penguil, and the Dumpling brothers.

== Production Staff ==
- Director: Kim Keum Soo
- Producers: An Seong Eun, Cheon Chae Jeong
- Art Director: Kim Hae Seong
- Scenario: Hwang Seok Yeon
- Continuity: Kooji Aritomi
- Marketing: Kim Sin Hwa
- Main Marketer: Koo Cheol Hoi
- Network: Euro Pictures, Poly Sound
- Business Networks: Iconix Entertainment, Wiz Entertainment, Zero One Pictures, Ani Cast

== Voice actors ==
- Nalong: Kim Seo-yeong
- Sungsung: Kim Youngsun
- Ukkya, Tori: Woo Jeong-sin
- Hobi, Riri: Ryu Jeom-hee
- Penguil: Lee Cheol-yong
- Nalong's father (Dalbong): Choi Han
- Panji, Tajori, Ukkya's mother: Yeo Min-jeong
- Ujuin: Um Sang-hyun

== See also ==
- Nalong 2
