= Your Letter (manhwa) =

South Korean webtoon

- Cover of the volume

연의 편지 RR: Yeonui pyeonji MR: Yŏnŭi p'yŏnji
- Genre: Drama
- Author: Hyeon A Cho
- English publisher: NA: Yen Press
- Webtoon service: Naver Webtoon (Korean); Line Webtoon (English)
- Original run: August 11 – October 27, 2018
- Volumes: 1
- Animated film
- Your Letter (2025)

Your Letter (Korean: 연의 편지) is a South Korean manhwa released as a webtoon written and illustrated by Hyeon A Cho. It was serialized via Naver Corporation's webtoon platform, Naver Webtoon, from August to October 2018, with the individual chapters collected and published the first volume. The manhwa has been published in English by Line Webtoon. A South Korean animated film adaptation produced by Studio N and Studio Lico premiered in October 2025.

== Characters ==
- Sori Lee
- Eugene Park
- Yeon Jung

== Media ==
=== Manhwa ===
Hyeon A Cho serialized Your Letter on Naver's webtoon platform Naver Webtoon from August 11 to October 27, 2018, for a total of 12 chapters. During their panel at Sakura-Con 2023, Yen Press announced that they licensed the manhwa in English under their Ize Press imprint.

==== Volumes ====
No.	Original release date	Original ISBN	English release date	English ISBN
1	June 3, 2019	979-1-19-615571-1	July 23, 2024	979-8-40-090111-9
Chapter 1; Chapter 2; Chapter 3; Chapter 4; Chapter 5; Chapter 6; Chapter 7; Chapter 8; Chapter 9; Chapter 10; Epilogue (후기); Secret Letter (연의 편지 플레이툰)

=== Animated film ===
A South Korean animated film adaptation, produced by Studio N and Studio Lico and directed by Kim Yong-hwan, was released in South Korean theaters on October 1, 2025.

=== Video game ===
A visual novel video game titled Maybe: Interactive Stories has been released as an update on Android and iOS.

== Reception ==
Your Letter was included in the top ten titles of the 2025 Great Graphic Novels for Teens list by the American Library Association.
