= Jo Sang-gyeong =

South Korean fashion and costume designer

- Born: May 20, 1973 (age 53); South Korea
- Education: Korea National University of Arts (Department of Stage Design/Art History)
- Occupation: Costume designer
- Years active: 2002 - present

Korean name
- Hangul: 조상경
- RR: Jo Sanggyeong
- MR: Cho Sanggyŏng

Jo Sang-gyeong (Korean: 조상경; born March 20, 1973) is a South Korean art director and costume designer. She is known as a costume designer, for films such as Oldboy, Tazza: The High Rollers, The Host, and Modern Boy.

== Career ==
=== Beginnings and transition to film ===
Before specializing in cinema, Jo maintained a diverse freelance portfolio that included commercial installation art, interior design, stage art, and tutoring. She has cited her time in theater as foundational to her understanding of lighting and costume interaction.

While working on stage design at the Korea National University of Arts, Jo met art director Ryu Seong-hie, who had recently returned from the United States. At the time, the role of "art director" was still an emerging concept in the Korean film industry. Ryu recruited Jo to handle costumes for the action-noir film No Blood No Tears (2002). The success of this collaboration led to Jo receiving offers from prominent "Korean New Wave" directors, including Ryoo Seung-wan, Park Chan-wook, Bong Joon-ho, and Kim Jee-woon. Jo initially viewed costume design as a hobby rather than a formal career path, a mindset she credits for her professional longevity and lack of burnout. Although she was offered the costume design role for Memories of Murder (2003), she had to decline due to her pregnancy.

=== Continued career ===
While she briefly contemplated retiring to focus on childcare, she found domestic life unfulfilling and decided to return to work. Following a positive encounter with director Bong Man-dae, she accepted the costume design role for The Sweet Sex and Love and continued her career through her pregnancy. This was followed by her work on Park Chan-wook's Oldboy (2003). Her career continued to ascend with high-profile productions such as The Host (2006), Tazza: The High Rollers (2006), and Modern Boy (2008).

Jo established Studio Gomgom, in Dongdaemun Seoul. In 2014, the studio was moved to Seongnam, Gyeonggi Province. Her team includes costume designers Kwak Jong-ae, Son Na-ri, and Yoon Jeong-hee. Jo mentioned Oldboy, Modern Boy, The Front Line, and The Concubine as the defining projects that shifted her professional philosophy. Expanding her repertoire in 2017, she also designed the costumes for the musical Arirang.

== Personal life ==
Jo met Oh Man-seok when both were students at the Korea National University of Arts. After dating for a year and half, they married in 2001. The couple divorced in May 2007 but remain friends. They have a daughter named Oh Young-joo.

== Filmography ==
=== Film ===
Film credits
Year	Title		Director	Note	Ref.
Year	English	Korean	Director	Note	Ref.
2002	No Blood No Tears	피도 눈물도 없이	Ryoo Seung-wan	debut project	
2003	Oldboy	올드보이	Park Chan-wook		
2003	The Sweet Sex and Love	맛있는 섹스 그리고 사랑	Bong Man-dae		
2004	Faceless Beauty	얼굴 없는 미녀	Kim In-sik		
2004	Three... Extremes	쓰리, 몬스터	Park Chan-wook		
2004	The Big Swindle	범죄의 재구성	Choi Dong-hoon		
2005	Lady Vengeance	친절한 금자씨	Park Chan-wook		
2005	Boy Goes to Heaven	소년, 천국에 가다	Yoo		
2005	A Bittersweet Life	달콤한 인생	Kim Jee-woon		
2006	The City of Violence	짝패	Ryoo Seung-wan		
2006	The Host	괴물	Bong Joon-ho		
2006	200 Pounds Beauty	미녀는 괴로워	Kim Yong-hwa		
2006	The Fox Family	구미호 가족	Lee Hyung-gon		
2006	I'm a Cyborg, But That's OK	싸이보그지만 괜찮아	Park Chan-wook		
2006	Tazza: The High Rollers	타짜	Choi Dong-hoon		
2007	Hansel and Gretel	헨젤과 그레텔	Yim Pil-sung		
2008	Modern Boy	모던 보이	Jung Ji-woo		
2009	Thirst	박쥐	Park Chan-wook		
2009	Private Eye	그림자 살인	Park Dae-min		
2010	Midnight FM	심야의 FM	Kim Sang-man		
2011	Late Autumn	만추	Kim Tae-yong		
2011	The Front Line	고지전	Jang Hoon		
2012	Day Trip	영화	Park Chan-wook and Park Chan-kyong		
2012	The Concubine	후궁: 제왕의 첩	Kim Dae-seung		
2013	Mr. Go	미스터 고	Kim Yong-hwa		
2014	Kundo: Age of the Rampant	군도: 민란의 시대	Yoon Jong-bin		
2014	The Royal Tailor	상의원	Lee Won-suk		
2015	The Priest	검은 사제들	Jang Jae-hyun		
2015	Assassination	암살	Choi Dong-hoon		
2015	Veteran	베테랑	Ryoo Seung-wan		
2015	The Tiger	대호	Park Hoon-jung		
2016	The Handmaiden	아가씨	Park Chan-wook		
2016	The Age of Shadows	밀정	Kim Jee-woon		
2017	V.I.P.	브이아이피	Park Hoon-jung		
2017	The Battleship Island	군함도	Ryoo Seung-wan		
2017	Along With the Gods: The Two Worlds	신과함께: 죄와 벌	Kim Yong-hwa		
2017	A Taxi Driver	택시 운전사	Jang Hoon		
2017	The Witch: Part 1. The Subversion	마녀	Park Hoon-jung		
2018	Along with the Gods: The Last 49 Days	신과함께: 인과 연	Kim Yong-hwa		
2018	Illang: The Wolf Brigade	인랑	Kim Jee-woon		
2019	Bring Me Home	나를 찾아줘	Kim Seung-woo		
2022	The Witch: Part 2. The Other One	마녀 2: the other one	Park Hoon-jung		
2022	Hunt	헌트	Lee Jung-jae		
2022	A Man of Reason	보호자	Jung Woo-sung		
2022	Decision to Leave	헤어질 결심	Park Chan-wook		
2022	Alienoid	외계+인 1부	Choi Dong-hoon		
2023	Hopeless	화란	Kim Chang-hoon		
2023	The Moon	더 문	Kim Yong-hwa		
2024	Alienoid: Return to the Future	외계+인 2부	Choi Dong-hoon		
2024	Revolver	프랑스 중위의 여자	Oh Seung-uk		
2024	Uprising	전,란	Kim Sang-man		
2025	Virus	바이러스	Kang Yi-kwan		
2025	The Match	승부	Kim Hyung-joo		
2025	Mantis	사마귀	Lee Tae-sung		
2025	No Other Choice	어쩔수가없다	Park Chan-wook		

=== Television ===
Television credits
Year	Title		Director	Note	Ref.
Year	English	Korean	Director	Note	Ref.
2018	Mr. Sunshine	미스터 션샤인	Lee Eung-bok		
2020	It's Okay to Not Be Okay	사이코지만 괜찮아	Park Shin-woo		
2021	Dr. Brain	Dr. 브레인	Kim Jee-woon		
2020, 2023, 2024	Sweet Home	환혼	Lee Eung-bok	Season 1, 2, 3	
2022	Squid Game	오징어 게임	Hwang Dong-hyuk	Season 1, 2, and 3	
2022, 2023	Alchemy of Souls	환혼	Park Joon-hwa	Part 1 and 2	
2024	Jeongnyeon: The Star Is Born	정년이	Jung Ji-in		
2026	Can This Love Be Translated?	이 사랑 통역 되나요?	Yoo Young-eun		
2026	The Art of Sarah	레이디 두아	Kim Jin-min		
2026	Perfect Crown	21세기 대군부인	Park Joon-hwa		
2026	Portraits of Delusion	현혹	Han Jae-rim		

== Awards and nominations ==
Awards and nominations received by Jo
Award	Year	Category	Recipient(s)	Result	Ref.
Asian Film Awards	2017	Best Costume Design	The Handmaiden	Won	
Asian Film Awards	2025	Best Costume Design	Exhuma	Won	
57th Baeksang Arts Awards	2021	Best Costume Design	It's Okay to Not Be Okay	Won	
Blue Dragon Film Awards	2008	Best Technology	Modern Boy	Won	
Blue Dragon Film Awards	2008	Best Art Direction	Modern Boy (Note: Jo Sang-gyeong and Park Ju-yeong)	Nominated	
Blue Dragon Film Awards	2015	Best Costume Design	Assassination	Won	
Blue Dragon Film Awards	2025	Best Costume Design	No Other Choice	Won	
Buil Film Awards	2009	Best Art Direction	Modern Boy	Won	
Costume Designers Guild Awards	2022	Excellence in Contemporary Television	Squid Game	Nominated	
Grand Bell Awards	2005	Best Costume Design	Faceless Beauty	Nominated	
Grand Bell Awards	2007	Best Costume Design	Tazza: The High Rollers	Won	
Grand Bell Awards	2009	Best Art Direction	Modern Boy	Nominated	
Grand Bell Awards	2009	Best Costume Design	Modern Boy	Nominated	
Grand Bell Awards	2014	Best Costume Design	Kundo: Age of the Rampant	Won	
Grand Bell Awards	2015	Best Costume Design	The Royal Tailor	Won	
Grand Bell Awards	2015	Best Costume Design	Assassination	Nominated (Note: with Son Na-ri)	
Grand Bell Awards	2018	Best Costume Design	Illang: The Wolf Brigade	Won	
Korean Film Awards	2008	Best Art Directing	Modern Boy	Nominated	
Korean Film Critics Association Awards	2008	Best Technology	Modern Boy	Won	
Women Filmmaker of the Year Award	2007	Best Technology	200 Pounds Beauty	Won	
Women Filmmaker of the Year Award	2007	Best Technology	I'm a Cyborg, But That's OK	Won	
