= Kwon Hyeok-soo =

- Hangul: 권혁수
- RR: Gwon Hyeoksu
- MR: Kwŏn Hyŏksu

Kwon Hyeok-soo (Korean: 권혁수) is a Korean name consisting of the family name Kwon and the given name Hyeok-soo, and may also refer to:

- Kwon Hyeok-soo (voice actor) (born 1954), South Korean voice actor
- Kwon Hyuk-soo (actor) (born 1986), South Korean actor
