= Night Light (TV series) =

- Also known as: Illumination; White Nights
- Genre: Melodrama
- Written by: Han Ji-hoon
- Directed by: Lee Jae-dong
- Starring: Lee Yo-won; Jin Goo; Uee
- Country of origin: South Korea
- Original language: Korean
- No. of episodes: 20

Production
- Executive producer: Lee Joo-hwan
- Producers: Lee Suk-gi; Cho Yoon-jung
- Production locations: Seoul, South Korea; Fukuoka, Japan; Nagoya, Japan
- Running time: 60 mins
- Production company: Night Light SPC (Note: A joint venture of TV Chosun subsidiary HIGROUND (formerly C-Story) and Victory Contents)

Original release
- Network: MBC
- Release: November 21, 2016 – January 24, 2017

Night Light (Korean: 불야성; Hanja: 不夜城; RR: Buryaseong) is a South Korean television series starring Lee Yo-won, Jin Goo, and Uee. It aired on MBC every Monday and Tuesday at 22:00 (KST) starting from November 21, 2016.

== Plot ==
A story of three individuals propelled by their undying greed as they clamor for wealth and power in order to reign supreme at the top of the food chain. Seo Yi-kyung (Lee Yo-won), a cold crystal of a woman who is willing to do anything for her ambitions and she doesn't believe that greed is a sin. Park Gun-woo (Jin Goo), a warm-hearted, free-spirited man of integrity and the heir of a big company who got betrayed by his love, Yi-kyung, 12 years ago. Lee Se-jin (Uee) is a hired persona and comes from a poor family, she lost her parents when she was young, and desperately wants to escape from her situation.

== Cast ==
=== Main ===
- Lee Yo-won as Seo Yi-kyung

A cold woman and the embodiment of heated passion who wants to be the queen of her own enterprise.

- Jin Goo as Park Gun-woo

A chaebol's son with a free-spirited personality, and initially decides to put aside his status to pursue music.

- Uee as Lee Se-jin

A poor woman who works multiple jobs to turn her life around.

=== Supporting ===
==== S Finance ====
- Choi Il-hwa as Seo Bong-soo
- Choi Min as Jo Seong-mook
- Shim Yi-young as Writer Kim
- Jung Hae-in as Tak

==== Sejin's family ====
- Yoon Bok-in as Kim Hwa-sook
- Kim Go-eun as Shin Song-mi
- Kim Bo-yoon as Shin Dong-mi

==== Mujin Group ====
- Jung Han-yong as Park Moo-il
- Lee Jae-yong as Park Moo-sam
- Nam Gi-ae as Moon Hee-jeong

==== Tianjin Finance ====
- Jun Gook-hwan as Son Ee-sung
- Park Seon-woo as Son Gi-tae
- Lee Ho-jung as Son Ma-ri

==== BaekSong Foundation ====
- Jung Dong-hwan as Jang Tae-joon
- Song Yeong-kyu as Nam Jong-kyu

=== Others ===
- Lee Yoon-sang
- Cha Sun-hyung
- Hwang Shi-myung
- Kim Sa-hoon
- Sung Nak-kyung
- Min Joon-hyun
- Seo Yoon-seok
- Kim Hyun
- Na Jong-soo
- Kwon Hyeok-soo
- Jun Jin-gi
- Son Sun-keun
- Kim Yong-hwan
- Bae Gi-beom

=== Special appearance ===
- Kim Kang-hyun
- Jung Seung-gil
- Oh Jung-se

== Production ==
The first script reading took place September 27, 2016 at MBC Broadcasting Station in Sangam, South Korea and filming began on October 4 in Seoul. The cast started filming in Fukuoka, Japan on October 16. The filming then moved to Nagoya on October 30.

=== Payment controversy ===
Three months after the end of Night Light, the TV Chosun subsidiary HIGROUND (then known as C-Story), one of its producers, was accused of not duly compensating the actors of the drama. When sought for comment, the company's management said that it was "confused by the reports and that while payments have been delayed, they have been communicating with all of the as-yet-unpaid actors".

=== Original soundtrack ===
Night Light Original Soundtrack

Soundtrack album by Various Artists
- Genres: Pop, K-pop, soundtrack
- Labels: Victory Contents; LOEN Entertainment
- Producer: Cho Yoon-jung (executive)

OST Part 1

No.	Title	Lyrics	Music	Artist	Length
1.	"Way" (길)	Park Jung-ok; Kim Joon-il	Park Jung-ok	XIA	3:48
2.	"Way" (Inst.)		Park Jung-ok		3:48
Total length:					7:36

OST Part 2

No.	Title	Artist	Length
1.	"Like That Day" (그날처럼)	Sungje (Supernova)	3:57
2.	"Like That Day" (Inst.)		3:57
Total length:			7:54

OST Part 3

No.	Title	Artists	Length
1.	"For Me" (나를 위해)	Bae Soo-jung	4:32
2.	"For Me" (Inst.)		4:32
Total length:			9:04

Charted Songs

Chart Performance

Title	Year	Peak chart positions	Sales	Remarks
Title	Year	KOR Gaon	Sales	Remarks
"Way" (XIA)	2016	91	KOR: 19,253+	Part 1

== Ratings ==
- In the table below, the blue numbers represent the lowest ratings and the red numbers represent the highest ratings.
- NR denotes that the drama did not rank in the top 20 daily programs on that date

Episode #	Date	Average audience share			
Episode #	Date	TNmS Ratings		AGB Nielsen	
Episode #	Date	Nationwide	Seoul National Capital Area	Nationwide	Seoul National Capital Area
1	November 21, 2016	5.7% (NR)	5.9% (NR)	6.6% (NR)	6.8% (NR)
2	November 22, 2016	7.2% (18th)	8.2% (18th)	6.3% (NR)	6.3% (20th)
3	November 28, 2016	6.1% (NR)	6.3% (NR)	5.5% (NR)	5.7% (NR)
4	November 29, 2016	6.1% (NR)	6.5% (NR)	6.2% (NR)	6.8% (17th)
5	December 5, 2016	5.3% (NR)	5.9% (NR)	4.7% (NR)	5.3% (NR)
6	December 6, 2016	6.4% (NR)	7.3% (NR)	5.4% (NR)	6.3% (NR)
7	December 12, 2016	4.2% (NR)	4.5% (NR)	4.7% (NR)	5.5% (NR)
8	December 13, 2016	4.6% (NR)	4.6% (NR)	5.2% (NR)	5.8% (NR)
9	December 19, 2016	4.1% (NR)	5.0% (NR)	3.8% (NR)	4.7% (NR)
10	December 20, 2016	4.1% (NR)	5.0% (NR)	4.5% (NR)	5.4% (NR)
11	December 26, 2016	4.5% (NR)	5.5% (NR)	4.4% (NR)	5.4% (NR)
12	December 27, 2016	4.1% (NR)	5.0% (NR)	3.8% (NR)	4.7% (NR)
13	January 2, 2017	3.7% (NR)	3.9% (NR)	4.1% (NR)	4.3% (NR)
14	January 3, 2017	4.3% (NR)	4.4% (NR)	4.7% (NR)	4.8% (NR)
15	January 9, 2017	3.5% (NR)	3.5% (NR)	3.4% (NR)	3.9% (NR)
16	January 10, 2017	3.5% (NR)	3.9% (NR)	4.0% (NR)	4.5% (NR)
17	January 16, 2017	3.2% (NR)	3.3% (NR)	3.1% (NR)	3.2% (NR)
18	January 17, 2017	3.7% (NR)	4.6% (NR)	3.5% (NR)	4.4% (NR)
19	January 23, 2017	4.1% (NR)	5.0% (NR)	4.1% (NR)	5.1% (NR)
20	January 24, 2017	4.4% (NR)	4.8% (NR)	4.3% (NR)	4.7% (NR)
Average		4.6%	-	4.6%	-

== International broadcast ==
Netflix acquired the international rights for the drama and is using the name White Nights for it.
