= Surgeon Bong Dal-hee =

2007 South Korean television series

- Promotional poster
- Also known as: Surgeon Bong
- Hangul: 외과의사 봉달희
- RR: Oegwa uisa Bong Dalhui
- MR: Oekwa ŭisa Pong Tarhŭi
- Genre: Medical drama Romance; Drama; Comedy
- Written by: Lee Jung-sun
- Directed by: Kim Hyung-shik; Yoo In-shik
- Starring: Lee Yo-won; Lee Beom-soo; Kim Min-jun; Oh Yoon-ah
- Country of origin: South Korea
- Original language: Korean
- No. of episodes: 18

Production
- Producers: Kim Yang; Kim Young-seob; Moon Jung-soo
- Production location: Korea
- Running time: 60 minutes Wednesdays and Thursdays at 21:55 (KST)
- Production company: DSP Media

Original release
- Network: SBS TV
- Release: 17 January – 15 March 2007

Surgeon Bong Dal-hee (Korean: 외과의사 봉달희) is a 2007 South Korean medical drama television series starring Lee Yo-won (in the title role), Lee Beom-soo, Kim Min-jun and Oh Yoon-ah. It aired on SBS from January 17 to March 15, 2007, on Wednesdays and Thursdays at 21:55 for 18 episodes.

== Plot ==
Bong Dal-hee (Lee Yo-won) approaches her life and work with a simple-minded gungho sincerity. She's had frail health since she was a little girl, and after she undergoes heart surgery, Dal-hee decides to pursue her dream of becoming a doctor. She graduates from a little-known medical school in her hometown, the remote island of Ulleungdo, and against all odds, gets accepted into the prestigious Hankook University Hospital residency program in Seoul. Dal-hee is determined to become a cardiothoracic surgeon, all the more so because of her own heart condition. Her old-fashioned name, provincial upbringing and lack of competitiveness mark her as different among the first year residents. She immediately gets on the bad side of Ahn Joong-geun (Lee Beom-soo), a brilliant but extremely strict cardiothoracic surgeon who often gets angry at the mistake-prone Dal-hee. Adding to the negative impression is Dal-hee's friendship with recently divorced general surgeon Lee Geon-wook (Kim Min-jun), who was Joong-geun's rival since their intern years. Geon-wook is attracted to Dal-hee, but he still has lingering feelings for his ex-wife, pediatrician Jo Moon-kyung (Oh Yoon-ah). Geon-wook and Moon-kyung split up after he learned that their six-year-old son was fathered by another man before they married, leaving him feeling betrayed and angry. Meanwhile, as they continue to work together, Joong-geun and Dal-hee grow closer. Called a "troublemaker" by her colleagues but loved by her patients for her compassionate personality, Dal-hee must learn to deal with professional setbacks, tensions on the job, hospital politics, patient deaths, romantic confusion and recurring ill health, on her way to becoming a full-fledged surgeon.

== Cast ==
- Lee Yo-won as Bong Dal-hee, 1st year cardiothoracic surgery resident
- Lee Beom-soo as Ahn Joong-geun, cardiothoracic surgeon
- Kim Min-jun as Lee Geon-wook, general surgeon
- Oh Yoon-ah as Jo Moon-kyung, pediatrician
- Kim In-kwon as Park Jae-beom, 1st year general surgery resident
- Choi Yeo-jin as Jo A-ra, 1st year general surgery resident
- Song Jong-ho as Lee Min-woo, cardiothoracic surgery resident
- Kim Hae-sook as Yang Eun-ja, Dal-hee's mother
- Kim Jung-min as Bong Mi-hee, Dal-hee's younger sister
- Baek Seung-hyeon as Kim Hyun-bin, cardiothoracic surgery chief resident
- Jung Wook as Jang Ji-hyuk, general surgery chief resident
- Park Geun-hyung as Lee Hyun-taek, chief of general surgery
- Lee Ki-yeol as Seo Jung-hwan, chief of cardiothoracic surgery
- Kim Seung-wook as Professor Park
- Kim Myung-jin as Professor Jung
- Sung Woo-jin as Instructor Oh
- Jo Myung-woon as surgical intern
- Lee Bom as Ah-jeong
- Im Sung-min as Nurse Go
- Jo Ah-ra as Nurse Lee
- Jeon Hye-sang as ER head nurse
- Jo Yeon-hee as Seon-ju
- Lee Hyun as Instructor Baek
- Lee Jong-min as Instructor Seo
- Jung Sung-woon as chief of emergency medicine
- Oh Man-seok as Oh Jung-min, Moon-kyung's ex-boyfriend (guest appearance, ep 13–14)

== Reception ==
Surgeon Bong Dal-hee was a hit; it recorded average ratings of 22.4% and a peak of 29.3%, and was number one in its timeslot for most of its run (beating the competition Dal-ja's Spring on KBS2 and Prince Hours on MBC). The series also received several acting, directing and popularity awards.

== Awards and nominations ==
Year	Award	Category	Recipient	Result
2007	43rd Baeksang Arts Awards	Best Actor (TV)	Lee Beom-soo	Nominated
2007	43rd Baeksang Arts Awards	Best New Director (TV)	Kim Hyung-shik	Won
2007	43rd Baeksang Arts Awards	Most Popular Actor (TV)	Lee Beom-soo	Won
2007	SBS Drama Awards	Top Excellence Award, Actor	Lee Beom-soo	Nominated
2007	SBS Drama Awards	Top Excellence Award, Actress	Lee Yo-won	Won
2007	SBS Drama Awards	Best Supporting Actor in a Miniseries	Kim In-kwon	Nominated
2007	SBS Drama Awards	Best Supporting Actress in a Miniseries	Choi Yeo-jin	Nominated
2007	SBS Drama Awards	Best Young Actor	Joo Min-soo	Won
2007	SBS Drama Awards	PD Award	Lee Beom-soo	Won
2007	SBS Drama Awards	Netizen Popularity Award	Lee Yo-won	Won
2007	SBS Drama Awards	Best Couple Award	Lee Yo-won and Lee Beom-soo	Won
2007	SBS Drama Awards	Top 10 Stars	Lee Beom-soo	Won
2007	SBS Drama Awards	Top 10 Stars	Lee Yo-won	Won
2007	SBS Drama Awards	New Star Award	Song Jong-ho	Won
2007	SBS Drama Awards	New Star Award	Choi Yeo-jin	Won

== International broadcast ==
- It aired in Vietnam on HTV3 from February 9, 2009.
