= No Man is an Island (2018 film) =

Mockumentary by Nash Ang

No Man Is an Island
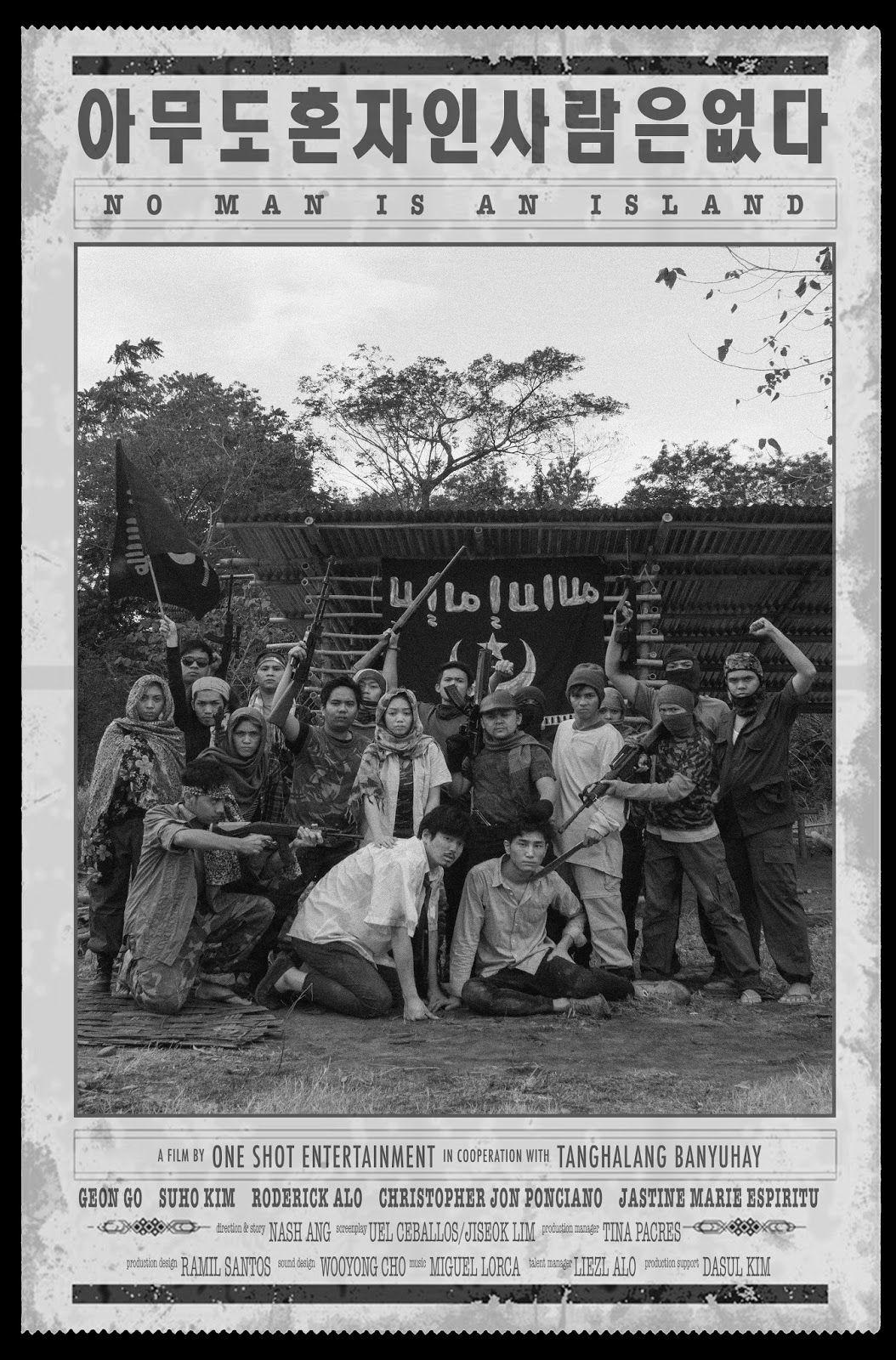
- Directed by: Nash Ang
- Written by: Racquel Ceballos
- Starring: Roderick Alo; Jiseok Lim; Suho Kim
- Release date: September 29, 2018 (South Korea)
- Running time: 35 minutes
- Countries: South Korea; Philippines
- Languages: Korean; Tagalog; English

No Man Is an Island (Korean: 아무도 혼자인 사람은 없다; alternative title: Story of No Die) is a 2018 South Korean-Philippine short mockumentary film directed by Nash Ang. Shot in a single take using a smartphone, the film stars Roderick Alo, Jiseok Lim, and Suho Kim, and centers on a hostage crisis in the southern Philippines to explore religious extremism and personal isolation. The film received the Special Jury Award at the 1st Ulsan New Media Film Festival in September 2018.

== Plot ==
A leader of a South Korean religious cult travels to the southern Philippines, where he is taken hostage by members of the Abu Sayyaf militant group. A South Korean sex tourist is also captured in the same region. The film is structured as a mockumentary following the captors as they negotiate ransom payments and demand ideological submission from their captives. The narrative focuses on the psychological bargaining between the hostages and the militants during the crisis.

== Cast ==
- Roderick Alo as the Abu Sayyaf Islamic extremist leader
- Jiseok Lim as the South Korean Christian cult leader
- Suho Kim as the South Korean sex tourist
- Members of the Tanghalang Banyuhay theater group as the militants

== Production ==
Nash Ang developed the film while studying at the Korea National University of Arts in Seoul. Conceived as the bargaining segment of an omnibus project titled Five Stages of Death, the film explores grief within an extremist crisis. The anthology also planned to include segments such as Rich Dead, Poor Dead (Korean: 장례식; alternative title: The Funeral) and The Savior (Korean: 구원자).

The film was shot on a low budget, with the cast and crew financing their own travel between Seoul and Manila. Filmed in a single continuous take on a smartphone, the project required extensive rehearsals. The actors were recruited from theater groups in South Korea and the Philippines.

== Release and Screenings ==
The film was completed in April 2016. A preview screening was held on April 30, 2016, at the Multicultural Theater in Seoul, organized by the theater company Salad. The production was subsequently submitted to the Korean Film Council (KOFIC) for art film recognition.

The film's public festival screening occurred on September 29, 2018, at the 1st Ulsan New Media Film Festival. In February 2019, it screened in the short film competition at the 4th Singkuwento International Film Festival in Manila. The film was also included in the Directors Showcase at the Korea Pinoy International Film Festival in Seoul in September 2019.

== Accolades ==
At the 1st Ulsan New Media Film Festival in September 2018, the film won the Special Jury Award. In December 2018, Nash Ang was honored at the 9th Inquirer Indie Bravo! Awards in Manila. The Film Development Council of the Philippines (FDCP) recognized the film at the Film Ambassador's Night in February 2019.
