= Kim Sung-soo (actor) =

South Korean actor (born 1973)

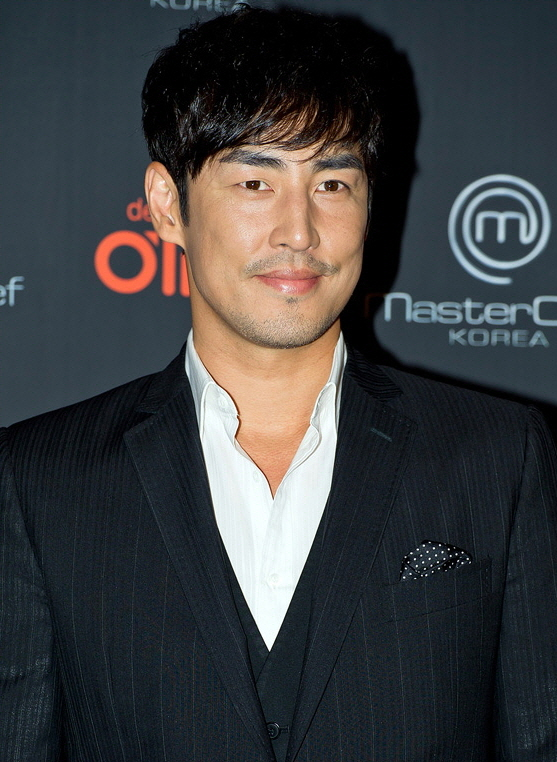
- Kim in April 2012
- Born: May 23, 1973 (age 53); Guro District, Seoul, South Korea
- Occupations: Actor; television host
- Years active: 1997–present
- Agent: Fantagio

Korean name
- Hangul: 김성수
- Hanja: 金聖洙
- RR: Gim Seongsu
- MR: Kim Sŏngsu

Kim Sung-soo (Korean: 김성수; born May 23, 1973) is a South Korean actor and television host. After beginning his career as a fashion model, Kim made his acting debut in the tokusatsu series Vectorman and the erotic film The Sweet Sex and Love. He has since appeared in the movies The Red Shoes and R2B: Return to Base, and several television series, including Full House, My Precious You, More Charming by the Day and My Lover, Madame Butterfly. In 2009 he made his stage debut in the play Mom, Do You Want to Go on a Trip?

More recently, Kim has expanded his career to variety shows. He was a regular on the popular reality show Invincible Baseball Team, and was the host of talk show Win Win in 2010. He also hosted several programs on cable, including fashion program Homme, bowling show Lucky Strike 300 and food show Noodle Myeongga.

== Filmography ==
=== Film ===
- Hero Vectorman: Counterattack of the Evil Empire (1999)
- The Sweet Sex and Love (2003)
- The Red Shoes (2005)
- Monopoly (2006)
- Hellcats (2008)
- California High Noon (short film, 2010)
- R2B: Return to Base (2012)
- Fasten Your Seatbelt (2013) - cameo
- The Black Hand (2015)

=== Television series ===
- Vectorman: Warriors of the Earth 2 (KBS2, 1999)
- Say You Love Me (MBC, 2004)
- Full House (KBS2, 2004)
- Stained Glass (SBS, 2004)
- Lawyers (MBC, 2005)
- My Beloved Sister (MBC, 2006)
- Cruel Love (KBS2, 2007)
- My Precious You (KBS2, 2008)
- More Charming by the Day (MBC, 2010)
- The Slave Hunters (KBS2, 2010) - cameo
- Suspicious Family (MBN, 2012)
- My Lover, Madame Butterfly (SBS, 2012)
- After School: Lucky or Not (Nate/BTV/T-store/Hoppin, 2013) - cameo (ep 3)
- Can We Fall in Love, Again? (jTBC, 2014)
- Should We Kiss First? (SBS, 2018)
- The Road: The Tragedy of One (tvN, 2021)

=== Variety show ===
- Star N the City: Kim Sung-soo in London (XTM, 2009)
- Invincible Saturday: Invincible Baseball Team (KBS2, 2009)
- Homme 1.0 (XTM, 2009) - MC
- Win Win (KBS2, 2010) - MC
- Homme 2.0 (XTM, 2010) - MC
- Lucky Strike 300 (XTM, 2010) - MC
- Saturday Night Live Korea (tvN, 2012-01-14) - Host, episode 7
- Noodle Myeongga (Olive TV, 2012) - MC
- MasterChef Korea Celebrity (Olive TV, 2013)
- Law of the Jungle in Caribbean/Maya Jungle (SBS, 2013)
- Law of the City in New York (SBS, 2014)
- Star Golf Big League (tvN D, Cast Member, 2021)

=== Music video appearances ===
- "Never Ending Story" (Boohwal, 2002)
- "추억은 시간이 지운다" (Youme, 2005)

== Theater ==
- Mom, Do You Want to Go on a Trip? (2009)

== Discography ==
- As Time Goes By (single, 2011)

== Awards ==
- 2004 SBS Drama Awards: New Star Award (Stained Glass)
- 2007 Korean Model Awards: Model Star Award, Fashion model category
- 2008 Jewelry Awards: Ruby Award
- 2009 Style Icon Awards: Male Cyon New Chocolate Fashionista
- 2010 MBC Entertainment Awards: Top Excellence Award, Actor in a Sitcom/Comedy (More Charming by the Day)
- 2013 SBS Entertainment Awards: Popularity Award (Law of the Jungle in Caribbean/Maya Jungle)
