= My Horrible Boss =

2016 South Korean television series

- Promotional poster
- Hangul: 욱씨남정기
- RR: Ukssi Nam Jeonggi
- MR: Ukssi Nam Chŏnggi
- Genre: Romantic comedy; Drama
- Created by: Kang Eun-kyung
- Written by: Joo Hyun
- Directed by: Lee Hyung-min
- Starring: Lee Yo-won; Yoon Sang-hyun
- Music by: Moon Seung-nam
- Country of origin: South Korea
- Original language: Korean
- No. of seasons: 1
- No. of episodes: 16

Production
- Executive producers: Song Won-seob; Park Dae-young
- Producers: Park Hyun-ji; Park In-sun; Ahn Je-hyun; Park Joon-seo; Shin Sang-yoon
- Editors: Bae Young-joo; Park Soom-hee
- Running time: 60 minutes
- Production companies: Samhwa Networks; Drama House

Original release
- Network: JTBC
- Release: March 18 – May 7, 2016

My Horrible Boss (Korean: 욱씨남정기; lit. 'Ms. Temper and Nam Jung-gi') is a 2016 South Korean television series starring Lee Yo-won and Yoon Sang-hyun. It aired on JTBC's Fridays and Saturdays at 23:00 (KST) from March 18 to May 7, 2016 for 16 episodes.

== Synopsis ==
Marketing Department Manager, Nam Jung-gi (Yoon Sang-hyun) is so nice that his colleagues call him "Father Theresa" and "Walking UNICEF". There is nothing that can ruffle Jung-gi's feathers but his new coworker from their main competition, Ok Da-jeong (Lee Yo-won), who is so nasty she's been nicknamed "Ms. Temper", and isn't impressed with Jung-gi's affable nature. A figure from Ok Da-jeong's past makes it his mission to destroy the one thing that she cares about, and puts the company's livelihood on the line. Despite their differences, will they be able to unite to save their company?

== Cast ==
=== Main ===
- Lee Yo-won as Ok Da-jeong
- Yoon Sang-hyun as Nam Jung-gi

=== Supporting ===
==== Nam Jung-gi's family ====
- Hwang Chan-sung as Nam Bong-gi
- Choi Hyun-joon as Nam Woo-joo
- Im Ha-ryong as Nam Yong-gab

==== Gold Chemicals ====
- Son Jong-hak as Kim Hwan-kyu
- Song Jae-hee as Ji Yoon-ho (Da-jung's 1st ex-husband)

==== Lovely Cosmetic ====
- Yoo Jae-myung as Jo Dong-kyu, President of Lovely Cosmetic
- Kim Sun-young as Han Young-mi, Nam's subordinate and a section head
- Kwon Hyun-sang as Park Hyun-woo, Nam's deputy
- Hwang Bo-ra as Jang Mi-ri, a temp assigned to Nam's department
- Ahn Sang-woo as Shin, Internal Affairs Department manager and brother-in-law of President Jo

=== Extended ===
- Maeng Bong-hak
- Ji Seong-geun
- Yang Joo-ho as team leader Yang Joo-ho
- Song Seong-chan
- Jeon Byung-cheol
- Han Jeong-gook
- Lee Min-seob
- Im Seung-tae
- Hong Ye-ri
- Seo Bo-ik
- Seok Il-woo
- Yoon Young-kyung
- Kwon Hyeok-soo
- Song Kyung-eui
- Choi Ri-ho

=== Special appearances ===
- Lee Jung-jin as Jang Si-hwan (Da-jung's 2nd ex-husband)
- Yeon Jung-hoon as Lee Ji-sang (Da-jung's 3rd ex-husband)
- MayBee as bank clerk
- Min Do-hee as Emily
- Oh Ji-hye as Jung Bok-ja (Da-jung's mother)
- Yoon Jung-soo as apartment 802's citizen
- Kim Sook as apartment 802's citizen
- Hong Seok-cheon as photographer
- Cheetah as Lovely Cosmetic's cosmetics model (episode 13)
- Yoon Shi-yoon as new recruit Yoon Shi-yoon (episode 16)

== Ratings ==
In this table, the blue numbers represent the lowest ratings and the red numbers represent the highest ratings.

Ep.	Original broadcast date	Average audience share	
Ep.	Original broadcast date	AGB Nielsen	
Ep.	Original broadcast date	Nationwide	Seoul
1	March 18, 2016	1.088%	1.6%
2	March 19, 2016	1.127%	1.3%
3	March 25, 2016	2.079%	1.9%
4	March 26, 2016	1.875%	2.4%
5	April 1, 2016	2.308%	2.3%
6	April 2, 2016	2.104%	2.5%
7	April 8, 2016	2.402%	2.7%
8	April 9, 2016	2.406%	2.7%
9	April 15, 2016	2.255%	2.4%
10	April 16, 2016	2.410%	2.9%
11	April 22, 2016	2.530%	2.6%
12	April 23, 2016	2.354%	2.3%
13	April 29, 2016	2.308%	2.7%
14	April 30, 2016	2.673%	2.5%
15	May 6, 2016	3.191%	3.4%
16	May 7, 2016	2.774%	3.4%
Average		2.243%	2.5%

- This drama airs on a cable channel/pay TV which normally has a relatively smaller audience compared to free-to-air TV/public broadcasters (KBS, SBS, MBC and EBS).

== International broadcast ==
- Malaysia - TV2 (Malaysia): starting June 12, 2018 (every Monday and Tuesday at 8:30 pm – 9:30 pm).
- In India - aired on MX Player starting February 3, 2023 only 5 Episode (every Friday new episode).
