= Water Ghetto =

2011 documentary film directed by Nash Ang

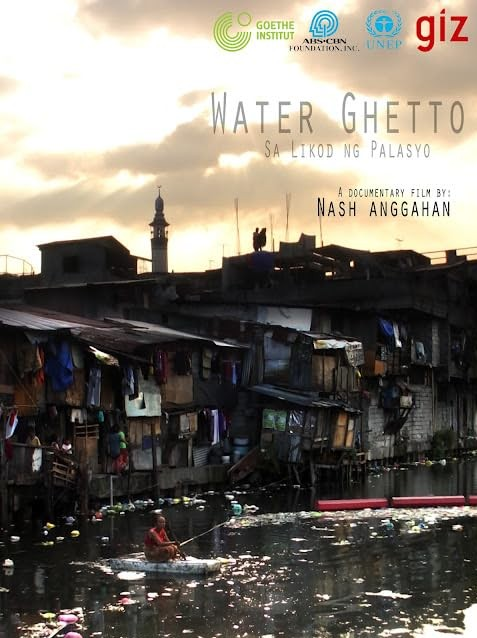
- Sa Likod ng Palasyo
- Directed by: Nash Ang
- Production company: OBRA Incorporated
- Distributed by: Goethe-Institut
- Release date: September 22, 2011 (South Korea)
- Running time: 120 minutes
- Country: Philippines
- Language: Tagalog

Water Ghetto (alternatively titled Sa Likod ng Palasyo), originally developed as the short film iskWater (alternatively titled Water and My Riverside Home), is a 2011 direct cinema documentary film directed by the Nash Ang. The film focuses on a community of Muslim informal settlers living over a canal behind Malacañang Palace, the official residence of the President of the Philippines. It was Ang's first feature-length documentary and premiered at the 3rd DMZ International Documentary Film Festival in South Korea in September 2011.

== Synopsis ==
The film follows Fitumanan and Minombao, two Muslim migrants who fled the armed conflict between the government and Islamic separatist groups in Mindanao to settle in Manila. They reside in an informal community built directly over a canal, living as a religious minority in the capital. To earn a living, Fitumanan collects recyclable plastic bottles from the polluted water on a makeshift styrofoam raft. Meanwhile, Minombao struggles with a chronic illness and has no access to basic medical services. The community faces eviction when the local government plans to demolish their homes to clear the waterways, forcing them to choose between staying in Manila or returning to Mindanao.

== Background and production ==
The documentary originated as a feature-length expansion of Ang's 2010 short film iskWater (alternatively titled Water), which explored the migration of Muslim settlers from Mindanao to Manila and their informal settlement behind Malacañang Palace. This was his first short film, produced while he was studying broadcasting at the Polytechnic University of the Philippines.

In December 2010, iskWater won the champion prize at the Southeast Asian Student Documentary Awards (SEAdocs) at the Science Film Festival in Bangkok, Thailand, an event organized by the Goethe-Institut and UNESCO to raise environmental awareness. That same year, another version of the short titled Water also won the Grand Prix at the ASEAN-Korea Multimedia Competition in Seoul, South Korea. In 2011, the short film, under the title My Riverside Home, won first place in the Developing Member Countries - General Category of the Asian Development Bank's (ADB) MyView H2O video competition. Following these international accolades, Ang received the Ani ng Dangal presidential award from the National Commission for Culture and the Arts in 2011, and the Senate of the Philippines introduced Senate Resolution No. 314 to commend his filmmaking breakthrough.

Ang subsequently secured a development grant from the Goethe-Institut to expand the project into a feature-length documentary, focusing on the Muslim migrant community settled over the esteros behind Malacañang Palace. Using observational methods, Ang spent several months living in the settlement. The production used direct cinema techniques, relying on observational footage of the residents without voice-over narration or reenactments.

== Release and reception ==
Following its premiere in South Korea, the documentary was screened at the South to South Film Festival in Jakarta, Indonesia, in February 2012. The film was also shown at the Goethe-Institut and Kineforum as part of a program highlighting environmental and social issues.

The film received coverage during its festival screenings. Writing for The Jakarta Post, critic Dina Indrasafitri noted the contrast between the informal settlers and the nearby presidential palace, describing the film's representation of development challenges shared by nations in the Global South.
