= Cruel Love =

South Korean TV series

- Promotional poster
- Hangul: 못된 사랑
- RR: Motdoen sarang
- MR: Mottoen sarang
- Written by: Lee Yoo-jin
- Directed by: Kwon Kye-hong
- Starring: Kwon Sang-woo; Lee Yo-won; Kim Sung-soo
- Country of origin: South Korea
- Original language: Korean
- No. of episodes: 20

Production
- Production location: Korea
- Running time: 60 minutes on Mondays and Tuesdays at 21:55 (KST)
- Production companies: DRM Media; Golden Thumb Pictures

Original release
- Network: Korean Broadcasting System
- Release: 3 December 2007 – 5 February 2008

Cruel Love (Korean: 못된 사랑; RR: Motdoen sarang; lit. Bad Love) is a 2007 South Korean television drama series starring Kwon Sang-woo, Lee Yo-won, and Kim Sung-soo. It aired on KBS2 from December 3, 2007, to February 5, 2008, on Monday and Tuesday at 21:55 for 20 episodes. Despite lackluster domestic viewership ratings, the series recorded high export revenues from Japan and Taiwan due to Kwon's Korean wave appeal.

== Synopsis ==
Na In-jung struggles with her love between the rather cold and rebellious pop culture artist Kang Yong-ki and a successful businessman, Lee Soo-hwan. Yong-ki was separated from his first love, Joan, and still carries the wound that he suffered from their relationship. His half-sister, Joo-ran, is married to Soo-hwan, who begins an affair with In-jung. However, Soo-hwan only has ambition for the CEO position of Yong-ki's father's company. Afterwards, Yong-ki discovers that his ambition does not fill the emptiness that he has inside and realizes he needs In-jung. When In-jung and Yong-ki have become a couple, In-jung has two choices between to choose her first love and stay with Yong-ki.

== Cast ==
=== Main characters ===
- Kwon Sang-woo as Kang Yong-ki
- Lee Yo-won as Na In-jung
- Kim Sung-soo as Lee Soo-hwan
- Cha Ye-ryun as Park Shin-young/Joan
- Kim Ga-yeon as Kang Joo-ran, Soo-hwan's wife and Yong-ki's half-sister.

=== Supporting characters ===
- Park Geun-hyung as Kang Woo-taek, Yong-ki's father who serves as chairman.
- Song Ok-sook as Lee Jin-sook, Joo-ran's mother
- Kim Chang-wan as Hwang In-soo
- Bang Eun-hee as Park Chan-sook
- Kim Min-jung as Soo-hwan's mother
- Choi Yong-min as In-jung's father
- Yu Ji-in as In-jung's mother
- Choi Sung-min as Yoon Sil-gang
- Jung Woo as Han Jung-woo
- Kim Hyang-gi as Lee Mi-so, Soo-hwan's daughter
- Yoon Hee-seok as Yong-ki's friend
- Lee Ha
- Lee Joo-seok

== Ratings ==
Date	Episode	Nationwide	Seoul
2007-12-03	01	7.8%	-
2007-12-04	02	7.5%	-
2007-12-10	03	8.2%	-
2007-12-11	04	11.6% (14th)	11.8% (12th)
2007-12-17	05	9.2%	-
2007-12-18	06	8.7%	-
2007-12-24	07	6.3%	-
2007-12-25	08	9.2%	-
2007-12-31	09	8.7%	-
2008-01-01	10	8.7%	-
2008-01-07	11	9.1%	-
2008-01-08	12	7.9%	-
2008-01-14	13	8.0%	-
2008-01-15	14	7.8%	-
2008-01-21	15	8.5%	-
2008-01-22	16	7.1%	-
2008-01-28	17	7.1%	-
2008-01-29	18	6.0%	-
2008-02-04	19	6.6%	-
2008-02-05	20	6.8%	-
Average		8.0%	-

== Remake ==
In 2014, a licensed remake titled Bring Back My Love to Me (Russian: Верни мою любовь, romanized: Verni Moyu Lyubov) was filmed. It aired on Inter in Ukraine and Russia-1 in Russia. The remake received a rating of 7.826 of 10 on Kinopoisk.
