= Take Care of My Cat =

2001 film by Jeong Jae-eun

- Theatrical release poster
- Hangul: 고양이를 부탁해
- RR: Goyangireul butakhae
- MR: Koyangirŭl put'akhae
- Directed by: Jeong Jae-eun
- Written by: Jeong Jae-eun
- Produced by: Oh Ki-min
- Starring: Bae Doona; Lee Yo-won; Ok Ji-young
- Cinematography: Choi Young-hwan
- Edited by: Lee Hyun-mi
- Music by: Byul.org; Cho Sung-woo; Park Gi-hyeon; Kim Jun-seok; Kim Sang-hyeon
- Distributed by: Cinema Service
- Release date: 12 October 2001 (South Korea)
- Running time: 112 minutes
- Country: South Korea
- Language: Korean
- Box office: US$9,866

Take Care of My Cat (Korean: 고양이를 부탁해; RR: Goyangireul butakhae) is a 2001 South Korean coming-of-age film, the feature debut of director Jeong Jae-eun. It chronicles the lives of a group of friends — five young women — a year after they graduate from high school, showing the heartbreaking changes and inspiring difficulties they face in both their friendships and the working world in the context of globalization.

== Plot ==
In the bleak industrial landscape of historical port city of Incheon, five young women struggle to transition from high school to the adult world. Hae-joo pursues a career at a brokerage firm in Seoul, Tae-hee works without pay at her family's sauna and volunteers as a typist for a poet with cerebral palsy, Ji-young struggles to find work while living in a dilapidated house with her elderly grandparents and a kitten named Teetee, and twin sisters Bi-ryu and Ohn-jo live on their own and sell handmade jewellery on the street.

Hae-joo tries to make herself invaluable at work but finds that she is at the bottom of the workplace hierarchy, relegated to running errands like sending faxes and bringing coffee. She is preoccupied with impressing her bosses at work and improving her physical appearance. In contrast, Ji-young has more immediate concerns—finding work to support herself and her grandparents and getting the landlord to fix the roof that is on the verge of collapsing. Unable to find meaningful employment, Ji-young grows increasingly frustrated with her poverty-stricken life with her elderly grandparents. Without parents to vouch for her, and without computer skills or driver's license, she drifts from one low-wage job to another. Tae-hee, who is constantly belittled and ostracized by her comfortably middle-class but oppressively heteropatriarchal family, dreams of escaping the conformity but does not know where she could go. She finds herself drawn to ferry terminals and foreign migrant workers. Bi-ryu and Ohn-jo, whose Chinese-speaking grandparents have disowned their mother and refuse to see them for reasons not discussed in the film, live on their own in an ethnic Chinese enclave in Incheon.

Hae-joo and Ji-young, who used to be best friends in high school, drift apart throughout the film in part due to their divergent socioeconomic status. After a sleepover at the twins' house one night, Ji-young returns home early in the morning to find that the roof of her house has collapsed, killing her grandparents. Refusing to cooperate with the police investigation and without any family support, Ji-young is locked up in juvenile detention though she has committed no crime. Tae-hee, who has grown closer to Ji-young, tracks her down and visits Ji-young in a youth detention facility. Ji-young reveals to Tae-hee that she has nowhere else to go even if she were released.

When Ji-young is released from the detention center, she finds Tae-hee waiting for her with a suitcase packed for a trip. Tae-hee reveals that she has run away from home, having taken the money she was owed from working for her family without pay for a year. She suggests that they travel together, perhaps on Working Holiday, as they had discussed earlier in the film. The film ends with Tae-hee and Ji-young at the Incheon International Airport, about to depart for an unknown destination.

== Symbolism ==
The cat Tee-tee is an important symbol of the ties between friends. Ji-young first brings the stray kitten into her home and later gives her as a birthday gift to Hae-joo. Hae-joo returns Teetee to Ji-young after just one night, saying that she has no time to raise a misbehaving cat in what appears to be a reflection of their deteriorating friendship. After Ji-young loses her home, she asks Tae-hee to take care of Teetee. Later, Tae-hee leaves Teetee in the care of Bi-ryu and Ohn-jo.

The friends stay in touch through the use of mobile phone, with text messages and ringtones appearing frequently throughout the film as ubiquitous threads that connect their lives to each other.

== Cast ==
- Bae Doona as Yoo Tae-hee
- Lee Yo-won as Shin Hae-joo
- Ok Ji-young as Seo Ji-young
- Lee Eun-shil as Bi-ryu
- Lee Eun-jo as Ohn-jo
- Hwang Seok-jeong as a beggar

== Reception ==
Though the film was not successful in the box office, it was critically acclaimed and generated a large fan base including a "Save the Cat" movement involving film industry professionals and Incheon residents who tried to extend its theatrical run. A campaign was also launched for a theater re-run in 2001.

Kevin Thomas for The Los Angeles Times praised the film for "depicting women's concerns without being the least bit preachy."

Local filmmakers organized a festival to support the survival of films that hold fast to artistic significance and compromise commercial success (in the process come and go without much recognition). The title of the event, WaRaNaGo, came from the initial syllables of four 2001 movies － Waikiki Brothers, Raybang, Nabi ("Butterfly") and Goyangireul Butakhae ("Take Care of My Cat") － which all fared poorly in the box office.

The film won numerous awards at international film festivals, namely the NETPAC Award and New Currents Award Special Mention at the Pusan International Film Festival, the FIPRESCI Prize at the Hong Kong International Film Festival, the Best Picture award ("Golden Moon of Valencia") at the Cinema Jove Valencia International Film Festival, a KNF Award Special Mention in the competition section of the International Film Festival Rotterdam, among others. It was invited to the Young Forum section at the Berlin International Film Festival and was also theatrically released in Japan, Hong Kong, U.K and U.S.A. In 2020, the film was ranked by The Guardian number 19 among the classics of modern South Korean cinema.

In 2025, the film was selected by the South Korean film director Lim Oh-jeong for the section 'Our Little History, Please Take Care of Our Future!' at the 30th Busan International Film Festival, recognized as a work that had a profound influence on her creative journey.

The film was restored in 4K and given a theatrical rerelease for its 25th anniversary in 2026.

== Awards ==
2001 Busan International Film Festival

- NETPAC Award
- New Currents Award - Special Mention

2001 Chunsa Film Art Awards

- Best Actress - Bae Doona, Lee Yo-won, Ok Ji-young
- Best Planning/Producer - Oh Ki-min
- Special Jury Prize - Jeong Jae-eun

2001 Blue Dragon Film Awards

- Best New Actress - Lee Yo-won

2001 Director's Cut Awards

- Best New Director - Jeong Jae-eun
- Best New Actress - Lee Yo-won
- Best Producer - Oh Ki-min

2002 Baeksang Arts Awards

- Best Actress - Bae Doona
- Best New Actress - Lee Yo-won

2002 Busan Film Critics Awards

- Best Actress - Bae Doona

2002 Korean Film Awards

- Best New Director - Jeong Jae-eun

2002 Hong Kong International Film Festival

- FIPRESCI Prize - Special Mention

2002 International Film Festival Rotterdam

- KNF Award - Special Mention

2002 Cinema Jove Valencia International Film Festival

- Golden Moon of Valencia (Best Film)

== See also ==
- List of South Korean films of 2001
