= My Little Brother =

- Theatrical release poster
- Hangul: 그래, 가족
- RR: Geurae, gajok
- MR: Kŭrae, kajok
- Directed by: Ma Dae-yun
- Written by: Jung Mi-jin; Yoon Pil-joon
- Produced by: Lee Sang-jin; Son Yoo-jin
- Starring: Lee Yo-won; Jung Man-sik; Esom; Jung Joon-won
- Cinematography: Jo Young-sang
- Production companies: iFilm; Chung Woo Film; 26 Company; Daydream Entertainment
- Distributed by: Walt Disney Company
- Release date: February 15, 2017
- Running time: 106 minutes
- Country: South Korea
- Language: Korean
- Box office: US$308,357

My Little Brother (Korean: 그래, 가족; RR: Geurae, gajok; lit. 'Yes, Family') is a 2017 South Korean comedy-drama film and the directorial debut of Ma Dae-yun. It is the first South Korean film to be distributed by The Walt Disney Company.

== Plot ==
After the death of their parents, the three Oh siblings were left with little choice but to learn to depend upon each other. Working as a reporter, Oh Soo Kyung (Lee Yo Won) does her best to support her family but it isn't easy. With her older brother, Oh Sung Ho (Jung Man Sik) unemployed and her younger sister, Oh Joo Mi (Esom) a talent-less beauty, it's up to Soo Kyung to make sure they all have enough to make ends meet.

Each dealing with their own struggles, the Oh siblings have a lot going on. But things get even more complicated when a young boy by the name of Nak (Jung Joon Won) appears out of nowhere, claiming to be their younger brother. With no idea where he came from, or what to do with him, the Oh siblings want nothing to do with this long-lost little brother. Unfortunately for them, the more they try to distance themselves from him, the more determined he becomes to be accepted as a member of their family.

Despite their best efforts, Soo Kyung, Sung Ho, and Joo Mi start to grow fond of Nak; but are their slowly-warming feelings enough to turn this stranger into a true member of the family?. !

== Cast ==
- Lee Yo-won as Oh Soo-kyung
- Jung Man-sik as Oh Sung-ho
- Esom as Oh Joo-mi
- Jung Joon-won as Oh Nak
- Kim Hye-eun as Soon-im
- Yoon Kyung-ho as Dal-joo
