= Paraiso (2015 film) =

Documentary film

- Directed by: Nash Ang
- Produced by: Victor Villanueva
- Cinematography: Nash Ang; Ronnie Gamboa Jr.
- Edited by: Nash Ang
- Music by: Miguel Lorca
- Release date: February 21, 2015 (Singkuwento International Film Festival)
- Running time: 60 minutes
- Country: Philippines
- Languages: Filipino; Waray; English

Paraiso (Tagalog: 'Paradise') is a 2015 Philippine documentary film directed by Nash Ang. Focusing on the aftermath of Super Typhoon Haiyan, the Category 5 storm that hit the Visayas in November 2013 and claimed over 6,300 lives, the film follows child survivors as they try to rebuild. A review in the Philippine Daily Inquirer highlighted the documentary's portrayal of these children's "struggles as they live on and rebuild their lives in what was once their 'paraiso' or paradise."

Beyond the Philippines, the film won the Grand Prix at Portugal's 21st CineEco International Festival of Environmental Cinema. Subsequent screenings in North Korea and Russia earned the project the 2016 Special Festival Prize at the 15th Pyongyang International Film Festival and the Mass Media Jury Award at the 15th Baikal International Festival. Its Russian run also marked the first time a Philippine film was shown at the ECOCUP International Green Documentary Film Festival in Moscow, which was followed by a screening at Moscow State University.

== Production ==
Ang initiated the documentary project while pursuing his filmmaking studies at the Korea National University of Arts under the Art Major Asian scholarship program. Having traveled to Leyte approximately one month after Typhoon Haiyan made landfall in November 2013, he began documenting the local recovery efforts.

The film was produced by Victor Villanueva, with Ang and Ronnie Gamboa Jr. serving as both co-cinematographers. Featuring a musical score composed by Miguel Lorca, the documentary was described by CineEco festival organizers as a form of direct cinema that "shows the lives of Filipinos, young and old alike, a month after supertyphoon 'Yolanda'... hit the country in 2013."

== Release ==
On February 21, 2015, Paraiso premiered as the opening-night film of the Singkuwento International Film Festival. Held at the Leandro Locsin Theater inside the National Commission for Culture and the Arts Building in Intramuros, the premiere marked the film's first public screening. In 2016, the film was officially selected and screened at the Filmambiente International Environmental Film Festival in Rio de Janeiro, Brazil.

For the North Korean and Russian festival runs, Ang traveled to Pyongyang to personally receive the Special Festival Prize from the chair of the Korea Film Import and Export Corp. at the Taedongmun Theater. He subsequently attended the Baikal festival in Irkutsk, Siberia, where the documentary received the Mass Media Jury Award.

Year	Festival	Location	Notes
2015	Singkuwento International Film Festival	Philippines	Opening night film
2015	21st CineEco: International Festival of Environmental Cinema	Portugal	Grand Prix (€2,000 prize)
2015	Transcultural Network Festival	South Korea	Closing film
2016	7th ECOCUP International Green Documentary Film Festival	Russia	First Filipino film at the festival; screened at the Center of Documentary Cinema
2016	Moscow State University screening	Russia	Special screening for students and faculty
2016	Filmambiente International Environmental Film Festival	Brazil	Official selection
2016	15th Pyongyang International Film Festival	North Korea	Special Festival Prize
2016	15th Baikal International Festival	Russia	Mass Media Jury Award

== Accolades ==
Year	Festival	Award	Source
2015	21st CineEco: International Festival of Environmental Cinema	Grand Prix (€2,000 prize)	Inquirer
2016	15th Pyongyang International Film Festival	Special Festival Prize	Inquirer
2016	15th Baikal International Festival of Documentary and Popular-Science Films	Mass Media Jury Award	Inquirer

For his cinematic achievements, which included directing Paraiso, Ang was honored by the National Commission for Culture and the Arts with the Ani ng Dangal in 2016.
