= Eleventh Mom =

- Hangul: 열한번째 엄마
- RR: Yeolhanbeonjjae eomma
- MR: Yŏrhanbŏntchae ŏmma
- Directed by: Kim Jin-sung
- Written by: Byun Won-mi
- Produced by: Park Jun-mo; Kang Wan-kyung
- Starring: Kim Hye-soo; Kim Young-chan; Ryu Seung-ryong
- Cinematography: Jeon Dae-seong
- Edited by: DigiCut
- Music by: Nouvelle Vague
- Production company: Sea Star Pictures
- Distributed by: Showbox/Mediaplex
- Release date: November 29, 2007
- Running time: 106 minutes
- Country: South Korea
- Language: Korean
- Budget: ₩1.8 billion
- Box office: US$1.9 million

Eleventh Mom (Korean: 열한번째 엄마; RR: Yeolhanbeonjjae eomma; also known as My 11th Mother) is a 2007 South Korean film starring Kim Hye-soo, Kim Young-chan and Ryu Seung-ryong. It was released on November 29, 2007, and attracted 350,204 admissions.

== Plot ==
Jae-soo (Kim Young-chan) leads a cruel life for an 11-year-old. His father (Ryu Seung-ryong) is an abusive and jobless gambler, so the little boy has learned to survive on his own, cooking or carefully spending his food stamps and running a string of part-time jobs. His father has previously taken home 10 girlfriends, and Jae-soo is used to the comings and goings of such transient mother figures. But one day, his father shows up with a woman (Kim Hye-soo). This eleventh "stepmother" moves in without warning, and the boy and woman are equally distrustful of each other. Jae-soo regards the woman as another person who'll leave and does not put any effort in getting to know her, while she is a cynical, aging bar girl seemingly devoid of maternal instincts. Jae-soo has dealt with all sorts of women, but this one is the worst by far. The two continually complain about each other and bicker. However, as time passes he learns that they have more in common than he realized, and they eventually develop a close bond.

== Cast ==
- Kim Hye-soo as Woman
- Kim Young-chan as Jae-soo
- Ryu Seung-ryong as Jae-soo's father
- Kim Ji-young as Baek-jung's mother
- Hwang Jung-min as Baek-jung
- Noh Min-woo as Joon-min
- Ahn Daniel as Ban-jang
- Gu Bon-im as Ban-jang's mother
- Park Hyun-woo as Sung-hyun
- Lee Eung-jae as Kkakdugi ("cubed radish")
- Im Yoon-jung as high school girl
- Kim Dong-hyun as 30-year-old thug
- Hong Ki-joon as photographer
- Hwang In-jung as teacher in charge
- Maeng Bong-hak as doctor
- Park Moon-ah as classmate
