= My Lover, Madame Butterfly =

Television series

- Promotional poster
- Also known as: My Love, Madame Butterfly; My Love, Butterfly Lady; My Love, Wife Na-bi
- Genre: Romance; Family; Comedy; Drama
- Written by: Moon Eun-ah
- Directed by: Lee Chang-min
- Starring: Yum Jung-ah; Park Yong-woo; Kim Sung-soo; Yoon Se-ah
- Composer: Park Se-jun
- Country of origin: South Korea
- Original language: Korean
- No. of episodes: 51

Production
- Executive producer: Oh Se-gang
- Producer: Baek Su-chan
- Production location: Korea
- Cinematography: Hwang Min-shik
- Editor: Park Soong-hee
- Running time: 60 minutes
- Production company: Pan Entertainment

Original release
- Network: SBS TV
- Release: October 6, 2012 – April 7, 2013

My Lover, Madame Butterfly (Korean: 내 사랑 나비부인; RR: Nae sarang nabibuin) is a South Korean romantic comedy television series starring Yum Jung-ah, Park Yong-woo, Kim Sung-soo, and Yoon Se-ah. It aired on SBS from October 16, 2012 to April 7, 2013 on Saturdays and Sundays at 20:40 for 51 episodes.

== Plot ==
Nam Na-bi (nabi means "butterfly" in Korean) was once a top star, whose less-than-stellar acting ability was overlooked thanks to her beauty and killer fashion sense, which afforded her immense popularity. However, the tide started to change when she got caught up in numerous incidents damaging her image. Stories of her haughtiness, vanity, rude speech, and difficulty spread and she lost all that favor and became infamous instead. The drama begins as Na-bi embarks on a new phase of her life after fame, fortune, and anti-fans: marriage. As a new bride to a mysterious husband, she moves in with her in-laws and becomes part of their family, where a new set of troubles and life lessons await her.

== Cast ==
=== Main characters ===
- Yum Jung-ah as Nam Na-bi
- Park Yong-woo as Lee Woo-jae/Lee Cheol
- Kim Sung-soo as Kim Jung-wook/Roy Kim/Jeff Kang
- Yoon Se-ah as Yoon Seol-ah

=== Supporting characters ===
Meji Beans Restaurant family

- Kim Young-ae as Lee Jung-ae
- Jang Yong as Kim Byung-ho
- Lee Bo-hee as Bae Shin-ja
- Kim Jung-hyun as Kim Chan-ki
- Cha Soo-yeon as Mok Soo-jung
- Kim Young-ok as Yoo Geum-dan
- Jung Hye-sun as Namgoong maknae
- Choi Min as Kim Baek-ki
- Kim Joon-hyung as Lee Gook-hee
- Kim Ga-eun as Kim Sal-goo

Chairman Lee's family

- Kim Sung-kyum as Lee Sam-goo
- Kim Il-woo as Lee Sung-ryong
- Im Sung-min as Hong Mo-ran
- Lee Dae-hyun as Lee Yoon

Extended cast

- Lee Hee-jin as Yeon Ji-yeon
- Park Tam-hee as Lee Yoo-jin
- Lee Hye-sook as Sylvia Choi
- Jo Soo-jung as store staff
- Ra Yong as Hong Seo-joon

Cameos

- Jo Jae-yoon as police officer Kyung-chal
- Yoo Hyung-kwan as PD Yoon Jae-ho
- Lee Jung-hun as Moon Hyung-shik
- Park Seul-gi
- Lee Doo-il
- Kim Dong-gyun
- Shin So-yul as girl on matseon ("matchmaking date")
