= Hyuk-soo =

- Hangul: 혁수
- RR: Hyeoksu
- MR: Hyŏksu

Hyuk-soo or Hyeok-soo (Korean: 혁수) is a Korean given name. Notable people with the name include:

- Kwon Hyeok-soo (voice actor), South Korean voice actor
- Kwon Hyuk-soo (actor), South Korean actor, singer, and comedian
- Lee Hyuk-soo, South Korean model and actor
