= Lee Yo-won =

South Korean actress (born 1980)

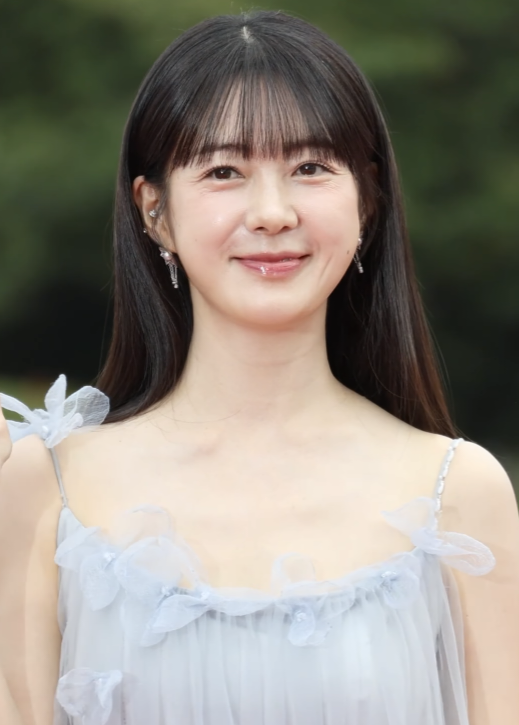
- Lee in October 2025
- Born: April 9, 1980 (age 46); Seongnam, South Korea
- Education: Dankook University – Theater and Film
- Occupation: Actress
- Years active: 1997–present
- Agent: Management Koo
- Height: 1.72 m (5 ft 7 1/2 in)
- Spouse: Park Jin-woo (m. 2003)
- Children: 3

Korean name
- Hangul: 이요원
- RR: I Yowon
- MR: I Yowŏn

Lee Yo-won (Korean: 이요원; born April 9, 1980) is a South Korean actress. She is best known for her portrayal of Queen Seondeok in the eponymous hit period drama.

== Career ==
Lee Yo-won was a sophomore in high school when she won a modeling contest and first appeared as a model in the November 1997 issue of fashion magazine Figaro. This led to commercials, then to minor roles in television series and movies. Though she started getting recognized by the public after the box-office success of anarchic comedy Attack the Gas Station (1999), her first notable acting role was in controversial TV drama Blue Mist (2001), where she played a young woman in her 20s who becomes romantically involved with a married man in his 40s.

Critical darling Take Care of My Cat (2001) followed shortly, for which she received several newcomer awards. In a later interview with Elle Korea in 2009, she cited the film as her most memorable work.

But after starring in a number of big-screen star vehicles that weren't received well by audiences and critics, Lee felt mentally and physically exhausted. After finishing the historical drama Daemang (lit. "The Great Ambition", 2002), she made the surprising announcement that she was temporarily retiring from the entertainment scene.

Lee made a successful acting comeback in 2005, as the lead actress in period drama Fashion 70's, which she chose because she wanted to work with TV director Lee Jae-gyu (who had previously directed Damo), and because it was not a typical love story, but depicted a woman's success in life and career. A supporting role followed in romantic comedy When Romance Meets Destiny.

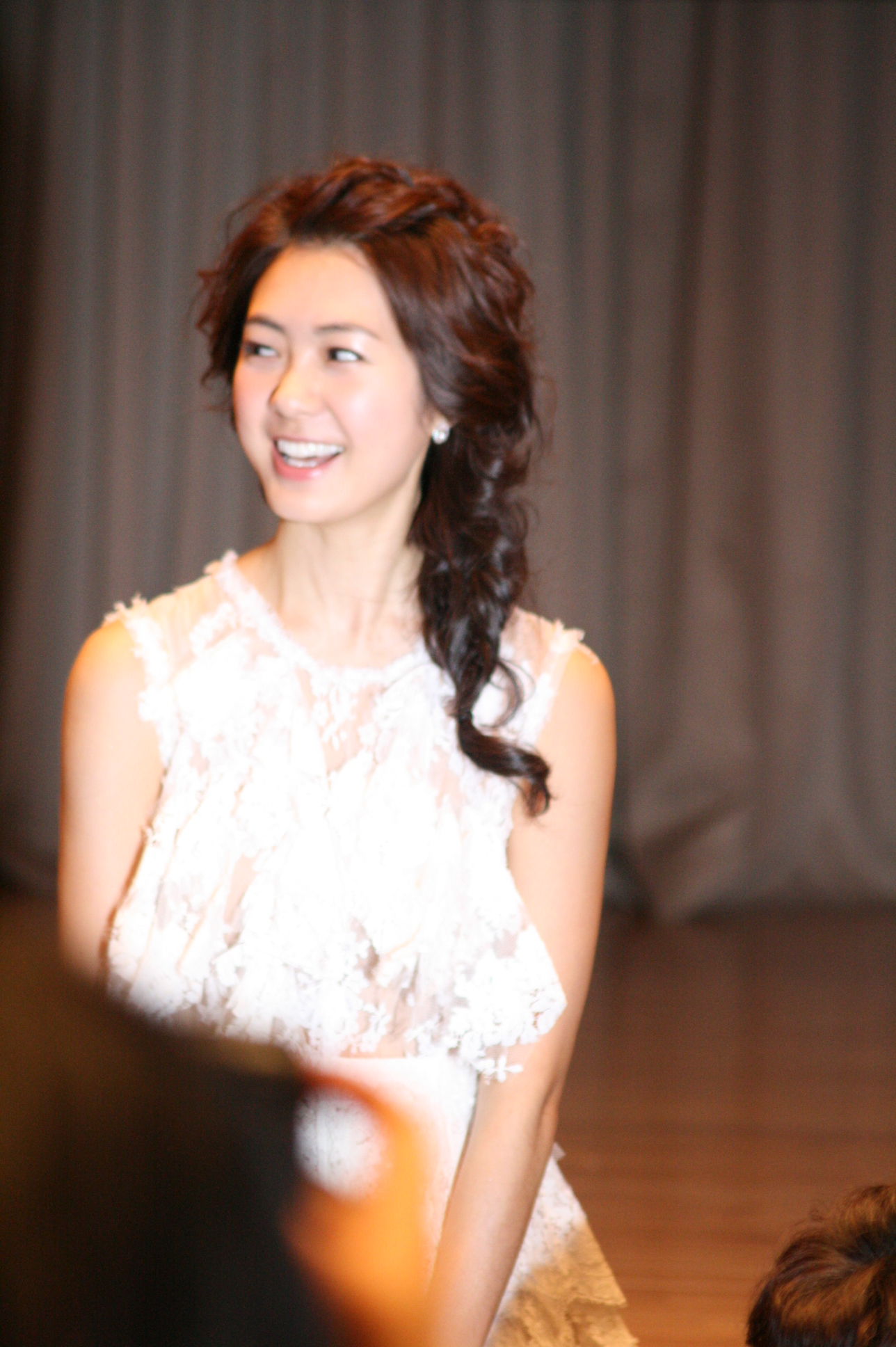
Lee at the 49 Days press conference in 2011.

In 2007, Lee played the titular character in hit medical drama/romance Surgeon Bong Dal-hee, though her next series, melodrama Cruel Love was less successful in the ratings. She then switched to more serious fare as part of the ensemble cast of May 18, a film about the Gwangju massacre and one of the highest grossing Korean films of all time.

Tired of playing fragile characters, Lee portrayed Queen Seondeok of Silla in the massively popular period drama Queen Seondeok (2009). Her follow-up, fantasy melodrama 49 Days (2011) in which she played dual roles as a woman possessed, also resonated with audiences. Afterwards she appeared in The King's Doctor (2012) about a Joseon-era veterinarian turned royal physician, and Empire of Gold (2013) which revolved around a power struggle over a chaebol.

On the big screen, Lee said after her enjoyable experience working with Jeong Jae-eun on Take Care of My Cat, she wanted to work with other female directors, so she starred in Anna Lee's romantic mystery The Recipe (2010) and Bang Eun-jin's crime thriller Perfect Number (2012). In contrast, she was cast in the only female starring role in Kang Woo-suk's Fists of Legend (2013), about middle-aged men who join a televised mixed martial arts tournament/reality show.

In 2016, Lee made a successful comeback to the small screen with the quirky romantic-comedy My Horrible Boss. Her role as a hot-headed career woman was well-received, with many citing it as her "rediscovery role". She then participated in another film, titled Yes, Family, playing a reporter who is the oldest among-st four siblings. Lee also starred in the MBC drama Night Light, alongside Jin Goo and Uee.

In 2017, Lee starred in the black comedy series Avengers Social Club.

In 2019, Lee starred in the espionage melodrama Different Dreams and The Running Mates: Human Rights.

== Personal life ==
Lee married businessman and professional golfer Park Jin-woo on January 10, 2003. The couple have two daughters & one son (born in Dec 2003, May 2014 and May 2015). Lee is Catholic.

== Filmography ==
=== Film ===
Year	Title	Role	Notes	Ref.
1998	Scent of a Man	young Eun-hye		
1999	Attack the Gas Station	Ggal-chi		
2001	Take Care of My Cat	Shin Hye-joo		
2002	A.F.R.I.K.A.	Lee Ji-won		
2002	Surprise Party	Wang Ha-young		
2005	When Romance Meets Destiny	Go Yun-kyung		
2007	May 18	Park Shin-ae		
2010	The Recipe	Jang Hye-jin		
2012	Perfect Number	Baek Hwa-sun		
2013	Fists of Legend	Hong Gyu-min		
2017	My Little Brother	Oh Soo-kyung		
2025	Galatea	AI Mom		
2025	The Beast (W/T)	Do Mi-Ae		

=== Television series ===
Year	Title	Role
1998	I Hate You, But It's Fine	Lee Bit-na
1999	March	Jung Yo-won
1999	School 2	Kim Yeon-jin
2000	Tough Guy's Love	Heo Ji-hye
2001	Blue Mist	Lee Shin-woo
2001	Pure Heart	Han Se-jin/Kang Hyun-joo
2002	The Great Ambition	Yoon Yeo-jin
2005	Fashion 70s	Han Deo-mi
2007	Surgeon Bong Dal-hee	Bong Dal-hee
2007	Cruel Love	Na In-jung
2009	Queen Seondeok	Princess Deokman/Queen Seondeok
2011	49 Days	Song Yi-kyung
2012	The King's Doctor	Kang Ji-nyeong
2013	Empire of Gold	Choi Seo-yoon
2016	My Horrible Boss	Ok Da-jung
2016	Night Light	Seo Yi-kyung
2017	Avengers Social Club	Kim Jung-hye
2019	Different Dreams	Lee Young-jin
2019	The Running Mates: Human Rights	Han Yoon-seo
2022	Green Mothers' Club	Lee Eun-pyo

=== Variety ===
Year	Title	Episode
2008	tvN World Special "LOVE"	Vietnam

=== Music video appearances ===
Year	Song title	Artist
1998	"Please Baby Don't Cry"	Deep
1998	"WAYO! WAYO! "	O.P.P.A
1999	"Will You Forgive Me"	A4
1999	"To Her Lover"	K2
2000	"I Love You"	Position
2001	ko|Joy Project - 1 Year of Love)"	WHY
2002	"울고 싶어지는 오후"	Ji Seo-ryeon
2006	"Liquor"	Vibe
2007	"Love's Greeting"	SeeYa
2007	"Ice Doll"	SeeYa
2009	"I'm Terrible in Love"	Shin Seung-hun
2012	"Love Is All the Same"	Yangpa

== Discography ==
=== Soundtrack appearances ===
Year	Song title	Notes
2009	"Bidam (A Sad Story)"	Track from Queen Seondeok Special OST Part 2

== Accolades ==
=== Awards and nominations ===
Year presented, name of the award ceremony, category, nominated work and the result of the nomination
Year	Award	Category	Nominated work	Result	Ref.
2001	KBS Drama Awards	Popularity Award	Blue Mist	Won	
2001	9th Chunsa Film Art Awards	Best Actress	Take Care of My Cat	Won	
2001	22nd Blue Dragon Film Awards	Best New Actress	Take Care of My Cat	Won	
2001	4th Director's Cut Awards	Best New Actress	Take Care of My Cat	Won	
2002	38th Baeksang Arts Awards	Best New Actress (Film)	Take Care of My Cat	Won	
2002	SBS Drama Awards	New Star Award	The Great Ambition	Won	
2005	SBS Drama Awards	Excellence Award, Actress in a Special Planning Drama	Fashion 70's	Won	
2005	SBS Drama Awards	Top 10 Stars	Fashion 70's	Won	
2007	27th Blue Dragon Film Awards	Best Leading Actress	May 18	Nominated	
2007	SBS Drama Awards	Top Excellence Award, Actress	Surgeon Bong Dal-hee	Won	
2007	SBS Drama Awards	Netizen Popularity Award	Surgeon Bong Dal-hee	Won	
2007	SBS Drama Awards	Best Couple Award with Lee Beom-soo	Surgeon Bong Dal-hee	Won	
2007	SBS Drama Awards	Top 10 Stars	Surgeon Bong Dal-hee	Won	
2007	KBS Drama Awards	Top Excellence Award, Actress	Cruel Love	Nominated	
2009	22nd Grimae Awards	Best Actress	Queen Seondeok	Won	
2009	10th Korea Visual Arts Festival	Photogenic Award	Queen Seondeok	Won	
2009	MBC Drama Awards	Top Excellence Award, Actress	Queen Seondeok	Won	
2009	MBC Drama Awards	Best Couple Award with Kim Nam-gil	Queen Seondeok	Won	
2010	Asia Model Awards	Special Award for Asian Drama	Queen Seondeok	Won	
2011	SBS Drama Awards	Top Excellence Award, Actress in a Drama Special	49 Days	Nominated	
2011	SBS Drama Awards	Producers' Award, Actress	49 Days	Won	
2011	SBS Drama Awards	Top 10 Stars	49 Days	Won	
2012	MBC Drama Awards	Top Excellence Award, Actress in a Special Project Drama	The King's Doctor	Nominated	
2013	6th Korea Drama Awards	Top Excellence Award, Actress	Empire of Gold	Nominated	
2013	SBS Drama Awards	Top Excellence Award, Actress in a Drama Special	Empire of Gold	Won	
2013	SBS Drama Awards	Top 10 Stars	Empire of Gold	Won	
2019	MBC Drama Awards	Top Excellence Award, Actress in a Monday-Tuesday Miniseries	Different Dreams	Nominated	

=== Listicles ===
Name of publisher, year listed, name of listicle, and placement
Publisher	Year	Listicle	Placement	Ref.
Forbes	2010	Korea Power Celebrity	22nd	
