= Nash Ang =

Filipino filmmaker and actor

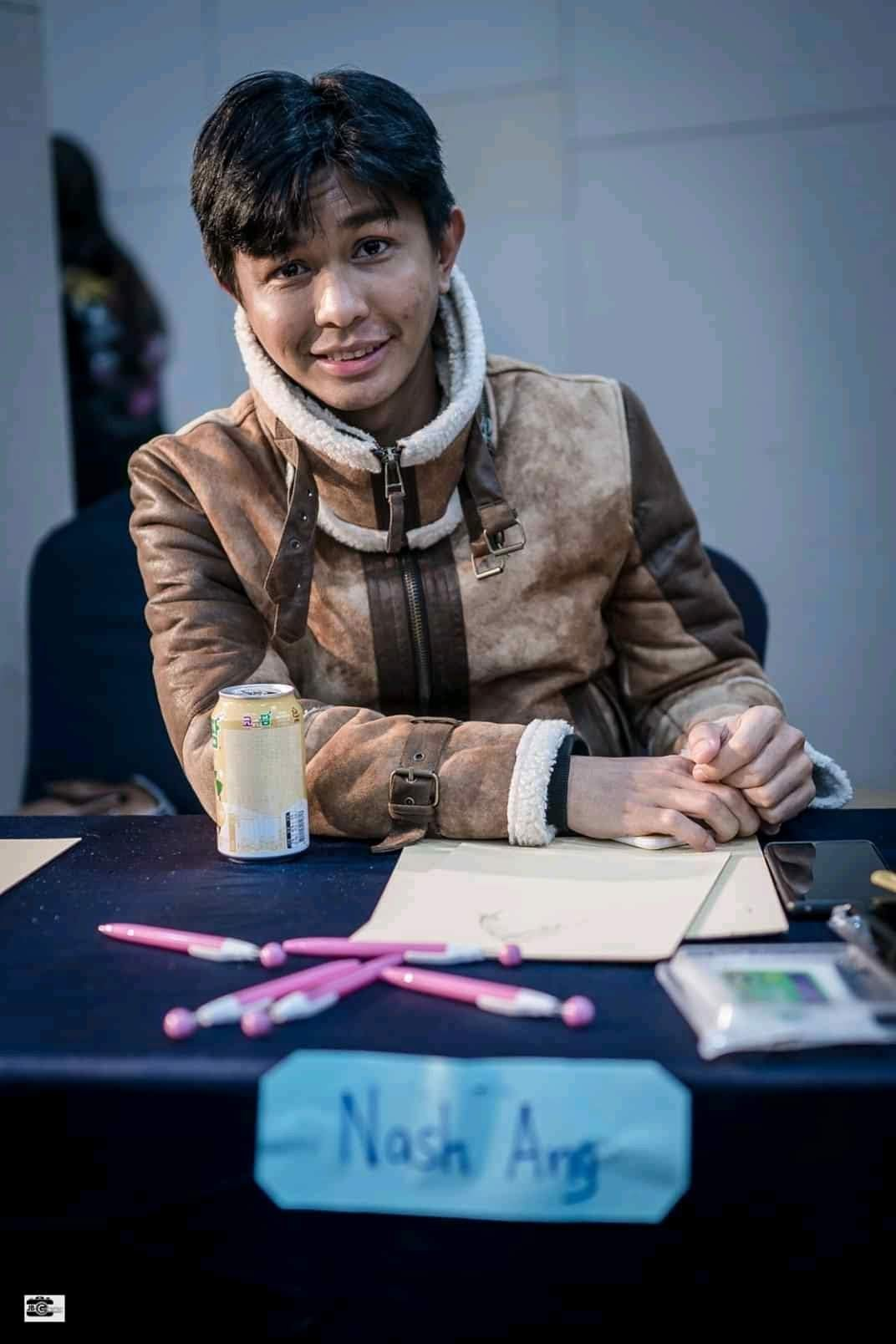
- Education: Korea National University of Arts
- Occupations: Director, actor
- Notable work: Paraiso (2015 film)

Nash Ang is a Filipino filmmaker and actor based in South Korea. His directorial work includes Seoul Mates (2014), a Filipino-Korean co-production identified by The Korea Times as the first feature film utilizing staff and actors from both countries. As an actor, he appeared in the 2019 tvN drama Arthdal Chronicles alongside Song Joong-ki. He also worked on the production as a language consultant, wherein he translated Tausug words to serve as fictional tribal dialects.

For these contributions, the National Commission for Culture and the Arts presented him with the Ani ng Dangal in 2011 and 2016. His recognition also includes being named a Film Ambassador by the Film Development Council of the Philippines in 2019, followed by the Migration Advocacy and Media Award from the Commission on Filipinos Overseas in 2022.

== Early life and education ==
Ang studied broadcasting at the Polytechnic University of the Philippines. In 2010, his short video Water won the grand prix at the ASEAN-Korea Multimedia Competition. The award ceremony was held at Gallery Jinsun in Jongno-gu, Seoul. On the same year, he won champion in the South East Asian Student Documentary Awards (SEAdocs) in Bangkok, Thailand with his short film iskWater The videos dealt with pollution of Pasig River.

He moved to South Korea in 2012, based from a full scholarship under the Art Major Asian program. He took a Master of Fine Arts in filmmaking at the Korea National University of Arts. Ang successfully challenged the university's decision in court after the institution rejected his application for readmission following an authorized leave of absence. In December 2018, the Seoul Administrative Court ruled in his favor, nullifying the university's decision and allowing him to re-enroll to complete his degree. He later studied technology and web development at the City College of San Francisco.

== Filmmaking ==
Ang's early documentaries explored migration from rural provinces to the capital. His 2010 documentary short isKWATER followed migrants relocating to the city, resulting in his first his first Ani ng Dangal award.

In 2011, his documentary Water Ghetto, which depicted settlers living along a canal behind Malacañang Palace, screened at the DMZ International Documentary Film Festival.

His documentary Live to Dive (Lusong) followed child scavengers retrieving garbage from Manila Bay. Screening at the 13th Pyongyang International Film Festival in September 2012, the film earned Ang the Best Director award; The Korea Herald reported the event as a rare instance of a South Korea-based foreign student screening a film in North Korea.

He wrote the first draft of Seoul Mates in 2013 while studying at K-Arts. He shot it as a feature in 2014. The film starred Korean actor Ji Soo and premiered at the Cinema One Originals Film Festival in Manila.

In 2015, his short Reason for Existence won grand prize at the Mirvac WA Short Film Festival in Australia.

That year he also directed Paraiso, a documentary about child survivors of Typhoon Haiyan. The film went on to win the Grand Prix at Portugal's 21st CineEco International Festival of Environmental Cinema, followed by the 2016 Special Festival Prize at the 15th Pyongyang International Film Festival and the Mass Media Jury Award at the Baikal International Festival in Russia. According to the Philippine Embassy in Moscow, it was the first Philippine film featured at the ECOCUP International Green Documentary Film Festival, which did result to a subsequent screening at Moscow State University.

Shot entirely on a smartphone, his 2016 mockumentary No Man Is an Island went on to receive the Special Jury Award at the Ulsan New Media Film Festival.

== Acting ==
Ang has taken supporting roles in South Korean television and film. Following his appearance in E J-yong's 2016 film The Bacchus Lady, he portrayed a member of the Wabi Tribe in Episode 9 of Arthdal Chronicles (2019). His other television credits include minor appearances in Cheo Yong (2014) as Ikbal, a Filipino worker who witnessed a crime, Tale of Fairy (2018), The Undateables (2018), and The Running Mates: Human Rights (2019).

In addition to screen roles, Ang has performed as an actor and participated in musical productions produced by Salad, a South Korean theater company featuring talent from diverse cultural backgrounds, where he also teaches acting to children of multicultural families, including their productions Masala (2019) and Suklay (2014).

== Other work ==
In 2007, Ang founded OBRA Incorporated, a nonprofit in the Philippines. He later established Pinoy Seoul in 2017, serving as an online media portal for Filipino diaspora in South Korea while he was employed as an International Correspondent for the Seoul City Government. Through this platform, he organized the Korea Pinoy International Film Festival in Seongbuk-gu in September 2019, which was recognized by Korea JoongAng Daily as the first Filipino international film festival hosted in Korea.

== Filmography ==
| Year | Title | Role | Notes |
|---|---|---|---|
| 2010 | iskWATER | Director | SEAdocs Documentary short |
| 2010 | Water | Director | ASEAN-Korea Multimedia Competition grand prix |
| 2011 | Water Ghetto | Director | Official Selection of 3rd DMZ Docs |
| 2012 | Live to Dive (Lusong) | Director | Produced by Reel Time of GMA News TV |
| 2014 | Cheo Yong | Actor | OCN TV series |
| 2014 | Seoul Mates | Director, Writer, Actor | Official Selection of Cinema One Originals 2014 |
| 2014 | Tears of No Dead (우는 남자) | Actor | Feature film |
| 2015 | Reason for Existence | Director | Mirvac WA Short Film Festival, Australia |
| 2015 | Paraiso | Director | Grand Prix, CineEco 2015 |
| 2016 | No Man Is an Island | Director | Short film; also known as Story of No Die |
| 2016 | The Bacchus Lady | Actor | Feature film |
| 2017 | The End of April (사월의 끝) | Actor | Feature film |
| 2018 | Tale of Fairy | Actor | tvN TV series |
| 2018 | The Undateables | Actor | SBS TV Series |
| 2019 | Arthdal Chronicles | Actor, Language consultant | tvN TV series |
| 2019 | The Running Mates: Human Rights | Actor | OCN TV series |
| 2019 | The Threshold of Death (사선의 끝) | Actor | Feature film |
| 2021 | Reset (리셋) | Actor | Short film |
| 2021 | Ssanahee Sunjung (싸나희 순정) | Actor | Feature film |

== Awards ==
| Year | Award | Work | Ref. |
|---|---|---|---|
| 2010 | Champion, South East Asian Documentary Awards (SEAdocs) | iskWater | |
| 2010 | Grand Prix, ASEAN-Korea Multimedia Competition | Water | |
| 2011 | 1st Place, Asian Development Bank's My View Video Competition | Water | |
| 2011 | Ani ng Dangal presidential award by NCCA | isKWATER, Water | |
| 2012 | Best Director, 13th Pyongyang International Film Festival | Live to Dive | |
| 2015 | Grand Prize, Mirvac WA Short Film Festival | Reason for Existence | |
| 2015 | Grand Prix, 21st CineEco, Portugal | Paraiso | |
| 2016 | Special Festival Prize, 15th Pyongyang International Film Festival | Paraiso | |
| 2016 | Mass Media Jury Award, 15th Baikal International Festival, Russia | Paraiso | |
| 2016 | Ani ng Dangal presidential award by NCCA | Paraiso | |
| 2018 | Special Jury Award, Ulsan New Media Film Festival | No Man Is an Island | |
| 2018 | Indie Bravo!, Philippine Daily Inquirer | No Man Is an Island | |
| 2019 | Film Ambassador, Film Development Council of the Philippines | No Man Is an Island | |
| 2019 | Interactive Media Award – Best Website on Migration, CFO | Pinoy Seoul | |
| 2022 | Migration Advocacy and Media Award, CFO | Himself | |
| 2026 | Grand Prize, UP Korea Research Center Essay Competition | From Arirang to SEAblings | |
