= The Red Shoes (2005 film) =

2005 film by Kim Yong-gyun

- Theatrical release poster
- Hangul: 분홍신
- Hanja: 粉紅신
- RR: Bunhongsin
- MR: Punhongsin
- Directed by: Kim Yong-gyun
- Screenplay by: Kim Yong-gyun; Ma Sang-Ryeol
- Based on: "The Red Shoes"; 1845 story by Hans Christian Andersen
- Produced by: Park Hyon-tae; Kim Kwang-su; Peter Kim; Shin Changgil
- Starring: Kim Hye-soo; Kim Sung-soo; Park Yeon-ah; Kim Ji-eun; Go Soo-hee; Lee Eol
- Cinematography: Kim Tae-kyeong
- Edited by: Shin Min-kyeong
- Music by: Lee Byung-woo
- Production company: Tartan Films
- Distributed by: Showbox Entertainment
- Release date: June 30, 2005 (South Korea)
- Running time: 103 minutes
- Country: South Korea
- Language: Korean
- Box office: US$7.7 million

The Red Shoes (Korean: 분홍신; RR: Bunhongsin) is a 2005 South Korean supernatural horror film co-written and directed by Kim Yong-gyun, based on the 1845 fairy tale of same name by Hans Christian Andersen.

== Plot ==
Sun-jae (Kim Hye-soo) leaves her unfaithful husband, Sung-joon, and moves into an old apartment with her daughter, Tae-su. She takes a pair of bright pink high heels she found in a subway car, only to discover that they are cursed. Her obsession grows, arousing envy and greed with nightmarish visions. Tae-su and Sun-jae's best friend, Kim Mi-hee (Go Soo-hee), also fall victim to the shoes, resulting in hysteria and theft. Mi-hee dies after she takes the shoes, and Sun-jae tries to get rid of them. However, the pink shoes always return to Tae-su and further horrifying Sun-jae.

With the help of her new boyfriend, In-cheol (Kim Sung-soo), Sun-jae tries to uncover the mystery behind the pink shoes before it kills her and Tae-su. She discovers that the person who takes them will die with their feet chopped off. The mystery leads to an old woman who lives in a basement below Sun-jae. The old woman identifies Sun-jae as Oki, which confuses her. It is revealed that in the old woman's youth, during the last years of the Japanese occupation of Korea, the old woman was a servant for a vain and sadistic dancer named Oki. She was often abused by Oki, which left her hunchbacked and scared of her.

Oki was jealous of a prominent dancer named Keiko, who was the daughter of a high-ranking officer and very talented. This is made worse when she is gifted pink shoes from a male dancer who had been her lover. Oki wanted the shoes for herself and paid the old woman to steal them. One night, a pregnant Keiko witnessed her lover and Oki having sex. When she fled out of betrayal and grief, the man tried to stop Keiko. Fed up with being second and realizing the man loves Keiko, Oki murdered Keiko and dumped her body. She wasn't aware that the old woman had witnessed Keiko's murder. Keiko's ghost then gets her revenge on both the man and Oki, leading to their deaths. The old woman warns her that the same fate will befall on Sun-jae if she doesn't return to shoes to Keiko at once.

At Keiko's gravesite, Sun-jae returns the pink shoes, hoping this will end the haunting. She visits In-cheol only to discover he has found out that she killed her husband. When she learns that Tae-su tells him the truth, she hurries home to try to kill her. She chases Tae-su to the subway station tracks to kill her, but at the last second, saves her life. Tae-su disappears, and Sun-jae looks for her. While trying to find her, she is confronted by the ghost of Keiko, who tells her the truth. It is revealed that Sun-jae is the reincarnation of Oki, which explains why the old woman feared her upon their first meeting. Keiko shows how Sun-jae murdered her husband, Mi-hee, In-cheol, and attempted to kill her own daughter. As Sun-jae tries to escape, she is faced with a deformed Keiko, who finally claims her.

In a brief moment, the scene switches back to 1944. Keiko is seen dancing passionately during rehearsals and wearing the pink shoes given to her.

The last scene reveals Tae-su practicing her ballet in her mother's bedroom. In a post-credits scene, a grown-up Tae-su picks up the pink shoes in the park (suggesting that Keiko meant for Tae-su to inherit the shoes).

== Cast ==
- Kim Hye-soo as Sun-jae/Oki
- Kim Sung-soo as In-cheol, Sun-jae's boyfriend
- Park Yeon-ah as Tae-su, Sun-jae's daughter
  - Kang Ye-won as Keiko/teenage Tae-su
- Kim Ji-eun as Keiko
- Go Soo-hee as Kim Mi-hee, Sun-jae's friend
- Lee Eol as Sung-joon, Sun-jae's ex-husband

== Reception ==
Ryan Daley from Bloody Disgusting said that although the film has occasionally "poor" pace, its cinematography is "striking" and that its plot machinations are "all over the map", which added to the confusion of the story. He also noted that "solid and stylish" gore was a plus to the film and that he was "dying" to know how it ended, even if [he] was a little overwhelmed by the final ambiguous twist."

== Awards and nominations ==
Year	Award	Category	Recipient	Result	Ref.
2006	43rd Grand Bell Awards	Best Actress	Kim Hye-soo	Nominated	
2007	4th Korean Film Awards	Best Actress	Kim Hye-soo	Nominated	
2007	4th Korean Film Awards	Best Art Direction	Jang Pak-h and Im Hyeong-tae	Nominated	
