= The Running Mates: Human Rights =

2019 South Korean television series

- Promotional poster
- Hangul: 달리는 조사관
- Lit.: Running Investigators
- RR: Dallineun josagwan
- MR: Tallinŭn chosagwan
- Based on: Running Investigators by Song Shi-woo
- Developed by: Studio Dragon
- Written by: Baek Jung-chul
- Directed by: Kim Yong-soo
- Starring: Lee Yo-won; Choi Gwi-hwa
- Country of origin: South Korea
- Original language: Korean
- No. of episodes: 14

Production
- Producer: Song Jung-woo
- Camera setup: Single-camera
- Running time: 60 minutes
- Production company: Daydream Entertainment

Original release
- Network: OCN
- Release: September 18 – October 31, 2019

The Running Mates: Human Rights (Korean: 달리는 조사관) is a 2019 South Korean television series starring Lee Yo-won and Choi Gwi-hwa. Based on the 2015 novel of the same name by Song Shi-woo, it aired on OCN's Wednesdays and Thursdays at 23:00 KST from September 18 to October 31, 2019.

== Synopsis ==
The series follows a group of investigators who work for South Korea's Human rights commission.

== Cast ==
=== Main ===
- Lee Yo-won as Han Yoon-seo
- Choi Gwi-hwa as Bae Hong-tae

=== Supporting ===
==== Human rights commission ====
- Jang Hyun-sung as Kim Hyun-seok
- Oh Mi-hee as Ahn Kyeong-sook
- Kim Joo-young as Bu Ji-hoon
- Lee Joo-woo as Lee Dal-sook

==== Others ====
- Shim Ji-ho as Oh Tae-moon
- Nash Ang as Sawadi
- Jang Hyuk-jin as Jang Dong-seok
- Kim Roi-ha as Han Gwang-ho
- Jo Soo-min as Han Yoon-jin
- Ryu Sung-rok as Jung Il-byung
- Park Bo-kyung as Jin Jin-nyeo
- Gu Ja-geon as Koo Ja-keon

== Production ==
The first script reading took place in June 2019.

On October 14, it was announced that the total number of episodes was reduced from 16 to 14.

== Ratings ==
In this table, the blue numbers represent the lowest ratings and the red numbers represent the highest ratings.

| Ep. | Original broadcast date | Average audience share |
| Ep. | Original broadcast date | AGB Nielsen |
| Ep. | Original broadcast date | Nationwide |
|---|---|---|
| 1 | September 18, 2019 | 1.207% |
| 2 | September 19, 2019 | 1.3% |
| 3 | September 25, 2019 | 1.18% |
| 4 | September 26, 2019 | 1.057% |
| 5 | October 2, 2019 | 0.813% |
| 6 | October 3, 2019 | 0.8% |
| 7 | October 9, 2019 | 0.819% |
| 8 | October 10, 2019 | 0.892% |
| 9 | October 16, 2019 | 0.6% |
| 10 | October 17, 2019 | 0.4% |
| 11 | October 23, 2019 | 0.9% |
| 12 | October 24, 2019 | 0.909% |
| 13 | October 30, 2019 | 0.8% |
| 14 | October 31, 2019 | 1.1% |
| Average | | 0.9% |

- This drama airs on a cable channel/pay TV which normally has a relatively smaller audience compared to free-to-air TV/public broadcasters (KBS, SBS, MBC and EBS).
