= The Recipe (film) =

- Film poster
- Directed by: Anna Lee
- Written by: Anna Lee; Jang Jin
- Produced by: Kim Jin-young
- Starring: Ryu Seung-ryong; Lee Yo-won; Lee Dong-wook
- Cinematography: Na Hui-seok
- Edited by: Kim Sang-bum; Kim Jae-bum
- Music by: Han Jae-gwon
- Production company: Film It Suda
- Distributed by: CJ Entertainment
- Release date: October 21, 2010
- Running time: 107 minutes
- Country: South Korea
- Language: Korean
- Box office: US$293,898

The Recipe (Korean: 된장; lit. 'Doenjang') is a 2010 South Korean film about a television producer who finds out many surprising truths while tracking down the story about a mysterious bean paste stew. Behind the captivating taste lies a woman's unfortunate life and love story.

== Plot ==
Jang Hye-jin (Lee Yo-won) is an ordinary woman whose doenjang jjigae (soybean paste soup) is to die for but only very few have tried it. They claimed the scent alone was so heavenly it was as if all around didn't matter.

When a notorious murderer on death row requests Jang's soup as his last meal, television producer Choi Yoo-jin (Ryu Seung-ryong) starts looking for Jang and the recipe. While looking, Chou Yoo-jin discovers how the police were only able to catch the killer due to him walking into a kitchen with the doenjang jjigae cooking. The killer was so captivated by the stew that he didn't even notice the police arriving to arrest him. The scent also froze the police until a chill breeze blew it away. They waited for the killer to finish before arresting him, but they wondered what it must have tasted like.

Jang is nowhere to be found and upon Choi's journey he learns she died while searching for her love, Kim Hyun-soo (Lee Dong-wook) but hopes to discover the recipe.

== Cast ==
- Ryu Seung-ryong as Choi Yoo-jin
- Lee Yo-won as Jang Hye-jin
- Lee Dong-wook as Kim Hyun-soo
- Jo Sung-ha as Park Min / Park Gu
- Lee Yong-nyeo as Han Myung-suk

Owner of mountainside restaurant

- Kim Jung-suk as Detective Kang
- Yu Seung-mok as Kim Deuk-gu
- Nam Jeong-hee

Grandmother

- Kim Se-dong

Blind man

- Park Hye-jin

Owner of Soondae Soup restaurant

- Yoo Soon-woong

Salt farm owner

- Lee Sang-hee

Owner of small store in the countryside

== Production ==
Twelve years after her last film, Rub Love, director Anna Lee mixes two different genres - the thriller and the love story. The English title, The Recipe, contains a lot of meaning: a record of a person's life, a memory of taste, an experience of loss and a chronicle of hurts. In this sense, the film is a recipe for everything. Lee illustrates the obsession with memories of love and a fatalistic point of view. The soybean soup recipe contains pain, longing and salvation. In a sense, the recipe is the very history of Korea's memory and tradition.
