= Kim Hye-soo =

South Korean actress (born 1970)

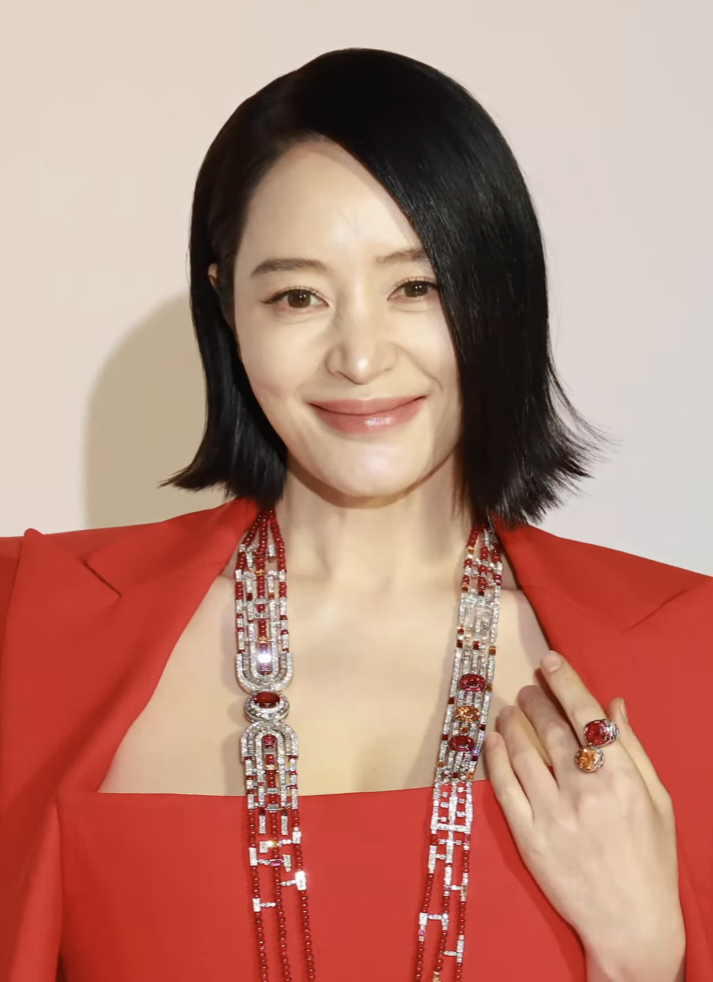
- Kim in March 2025
- Born: September 5, 1970 (age 56); Busan, South Korea
- Education: Dongguk University
- Occupations: Actress; singer; artist
- Years active: 1986–present
- Agent: Hodu&U Entertainment

Korean name
- Hangul: 김혜수
- Hanja: 金憓秀
- RR: Gim Hyesu
- MR: Kim Hyesu

Signature
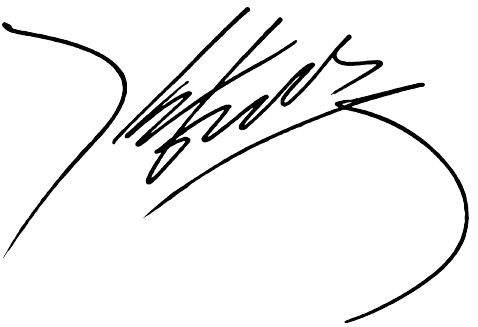

Kim Hye-soo (Korean: 김혜수; pronounced [kim.he.su]; born September 5, 1970) is a South Korean actress. Kim was one of the most popular teen stars in the 1980s and 1990s. She is known for her headstrong independence and regularly playing strong-willed, sophisticated women.

Kim began her career in an advertisement for Nestlé Milo in 1985. She made her film debut as a leading actress in the film Ggambo (1986), for which she received her first accolade as Best New Actress at 1987 Baeksang Arts Awards. She was the youngest winner of the Blue Dragon Film Award for Best Leading Actress in First Love (1993). Her most commercially successful role was Madam Jeong in the crime film Tazza: The High Rollers (2006), which also won her third Blue Dragon Film Award for Best Actress.

Aside from her performances in films, Kim has appeared in many successful television series, including Partner (1994–1998), Did We Really Love? (1999), Royal Story: Jang Hui-bin (2002), The Queen of Office (2013), Signal (2016), Hyena (2020), Juvenile Justice (2022), and Under the Queen's Umbrella (2022).

== Early life and education ==
Kim Hye-soo was born on September 5, 1970, in Busan, Dongnae District, the second of five children. She moved to Seoul Midong Elementary School while she was in third grade at Busan National Elementary School due to her father's work. While in elementary school, she was a member of the national Taekwondo children's demonstration team, and in April 1982 was the flower girl to present a bouquet to Juan Antonio Samaranch, the seventh President of the International Olympic Committee (IOC).

== Career ==
=== 1985–1991: Career beginnings and break into cinema ===
In 1985, Kim featured in a commercial for Nestlé Milo and as well as the first K-pop music video, Cho Yong-pil's title song Empty In The Air. In 1986, Kim made her film debut on Kambo when she was a first-year high school student. She also won Best New Actress for Kambo at 23rd Baeksang Arts Awards. Kim went on to play the leading roles in the television series Samogok (1987), Sun Shim-yi (1988), and Senoya (1989). She co-starred with Roh Joo-hyun in When The Flowers Bloom And The Birds Cry (1990). In 1991, she landed the main role in Lost Love.

=== 1992–1998: Television series and film success ===
Kim is referred to as a "Pencil Board Star" of the 1980s due to the popularity of pencil boards printed with her image. She has also been named a part of the "Troika of the 1990s" in Korea along with her contemporaries Kim Hee-sun and Shim Eun-ha for their nationwide fame. In 1993, Kim led the main role in the film First Love and gained critical acclaim for her portrayal of the archetypal innocent girl, winning a Blue Dragon Film Award for Best Leading Actress and earning her the title "Nation's First Love" although the film was a box-office failure.

=== 1999–2004: Career development ===
Over two decades, she amassed a sizeable filmography of leading and supporting roles, notably in the television series Did We Really Love? with Bae Yong-joon and Revenge and Passion with Ahn Jae-wook, as well as the film Tie a Yellow Ribbon (1998). In the 2000s, Kim focused more on her career in film rather than television, featuring in Kick the Moon, YMCA Baseball Team and Three. At this time, she reinvented her image as a glamorous and confident femme fatale in Hypnotized (2004).

=== 2005–2011: Revival by Tazza ===
Kim's roles in The Red Shoes (2005) and Tazza: The High Rollers (2006) were her most recognised and ushered her into the highest ranks of the Korean film industry A-list. Various film roles followed, such as a housewife secretly dating a college student in A Good Day to Have an Affair; a non-plussed aunt in Shim's Family; a prostitute in Eleventh Mom and a bar singer in Modern Boy (2008). She considers her collaboration with Han Suk-kyu in 2010's Villain and Widow as one of the highlights of her acting career. In 2009, Kim returned to television with Style, which was set in the fashion industry. She followed that with the mystery melodrama Home Sweet Home in 2010.

A frequent host of film awards ceremonies and TV variety shows, Kim became a host of MBC current affairs show W in 2015. Kim, an avid documentary fan, was considered a perfect it for the programme as it shifted its focus more to environmental and global issues. W with Kim Hye-soo premiered in July 2010, but was cancelled in October 2010, with Kim criticizing the network's decision.

=== 2012–2015: Film success ===
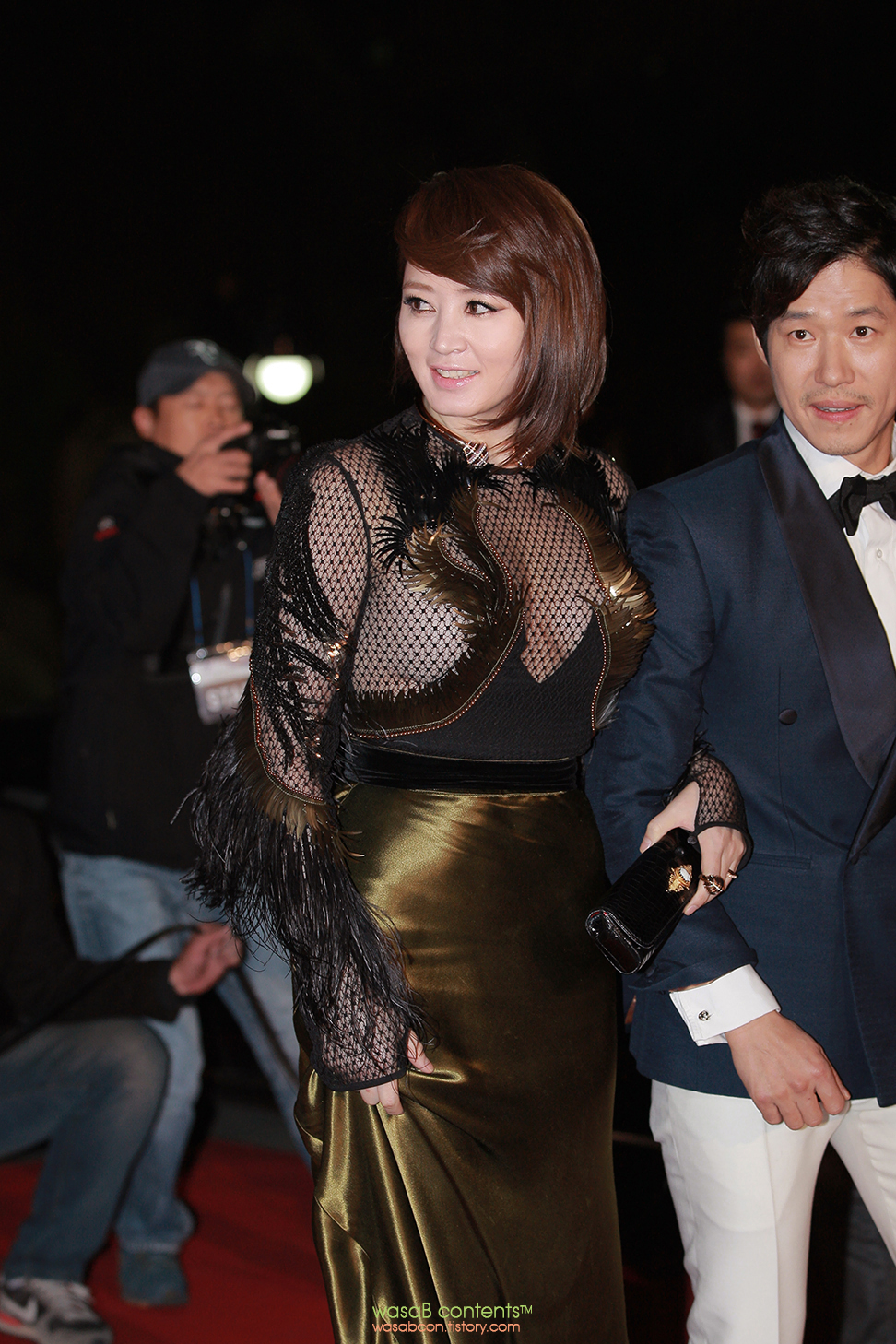
Kim with Yoo Jun-sang at the 34th Blue Dragon Film Awards in 2013

In 2012, she reunited with Tazza director Choi Dong-hoon in The Thieves. Set amongst the casinos of Macau, the heist film became one of the highest-grossing films in Korean cinema history. Kim won the Award for Best Actress in a Film at the 20th Korean Culture and Entertainment Awards This was followed with a supporting role in Han Jae-rim's historical film The Face Reader.

In 2013, she headlined the romantic comedy The Queen of Office (also known as Goddess of the Workplace), an adaptation of the 2007 Japanese drama Haken no Hinkaku ("Pride of the Temp").

Kim next starred in Coin Locker Girl (also known as Chinatown) in 2015, the rare female-driven noir film. She said she didn't mind looking unattractive for her role as a ruthless crime boss, with makeup artists adding age spots to her face, gray to her hair, and flab to her stomach and hips with prostheses. Kim said it was "mentally agonizing" deciding whether to accept the role, but once she did, she felt "a surge of excitement" every time she stepped onto the set, and considered the film "a new challenge that (made her) heart race and (scared her) at the same time."

=== 2016–present: Return to television and film ===
Kim made her small-screen comeback in 2016 with tvN's Signal, which was both critically and commercially successful. Kim as Cha Soo-hyun, acted opposite Lee Je-hoon and Cho Jin-woong as the first female police officer in the Special Task Force, later becoming the leader of the Seoul Cold Case Aquad. She won Best Actress at the 52nd Baeksang Arts Awards and the tvN10 Awards for her performance.

"First of all, I write down everything that comes into my eyes. In the case of an artist, I am not a casting director, but I remember and recommend it when there is a good work or a character that is suitable for the actor has come out. If you look at my memo, there is the person who are over 70 years old.

In general, if you remember the days when an actor wasn't in the spotlight but got impressed by yourself, 'Huh? I saw that actor before. I thought it was really good.' Don't you want to say that? The same goes for me. It's best when I'm with good actors."

— Kim Hye-soo on Familyhood interview

Kim then starred in the comedy drama Familyhood, a film directed by Kim Tae-gon, co-starring Ma Dong-seok and Kim Hyun-soo. Kim was nominated for Best Actress at 25th Buil Film Awards, 37th Blue Dragon Film Awards, and the 53rd Baeksang Arts Awards

In 2017, Kim also starred in the noir film A Special Lady. Directed by Lee An-gyu, Kim played Na Hyun-jung, a woman who becomes the second-in-command of a gangster organization-turned-leading business entity, opposite Lee Sun-kyun and Lee Hee-joon.

Kim Hye-soo's Refugee Diary was a documentary that aired on KBS1 in September 2017. Directed by Park Hye-ryeong, Jang Hyun-ho, and Lee Byung-han, with the script written by Kwon Hyeon-jeong. The documentary followed Kim Hye-soo's visits to refugees who had survived near-death experiences in the Mediterranean. During her travels in June 2017 to Serbia, Italy, and Greece, which were major refugee destinations, she witnessed the challenges faced by refugees. Despite restrictions, the number of refugees, especially children, continued to rise. Kim Hye-soo shared vivid stories of their journeys and expressed admiration for their resilience, particularly among children living alone without family or guardians.

In 2018, Kim starred in the IMF crisis film, Default, alongside Yoo Ah-in. She was nominated for Best Actress at the 55th Baeksang Arts Awards. Then she was cast in the science fiction film Return.

In June 2019, Kim signed on to appear in The Day I Died: Unclosed Case, Park Ji-wan's directorial debut. The film was released on November 12, 2020. Kim was nominated at the 57th Baeksang Arts Awards for the Best Actress in a Film category.

In 2020, Kim starred in the legal drama Hyena. She played Jung Geum-ja, a hyena who chased money and success no matter the cost. It aired on SBS TV from February 21 to April 11, 2020. She was nominated for Best Actress at the 56th Baeksang Arts Awards. She was honoured with Excellence Award at the 2020 Asia Contents Awards & Global OTT Awards for her performance in Hyena.

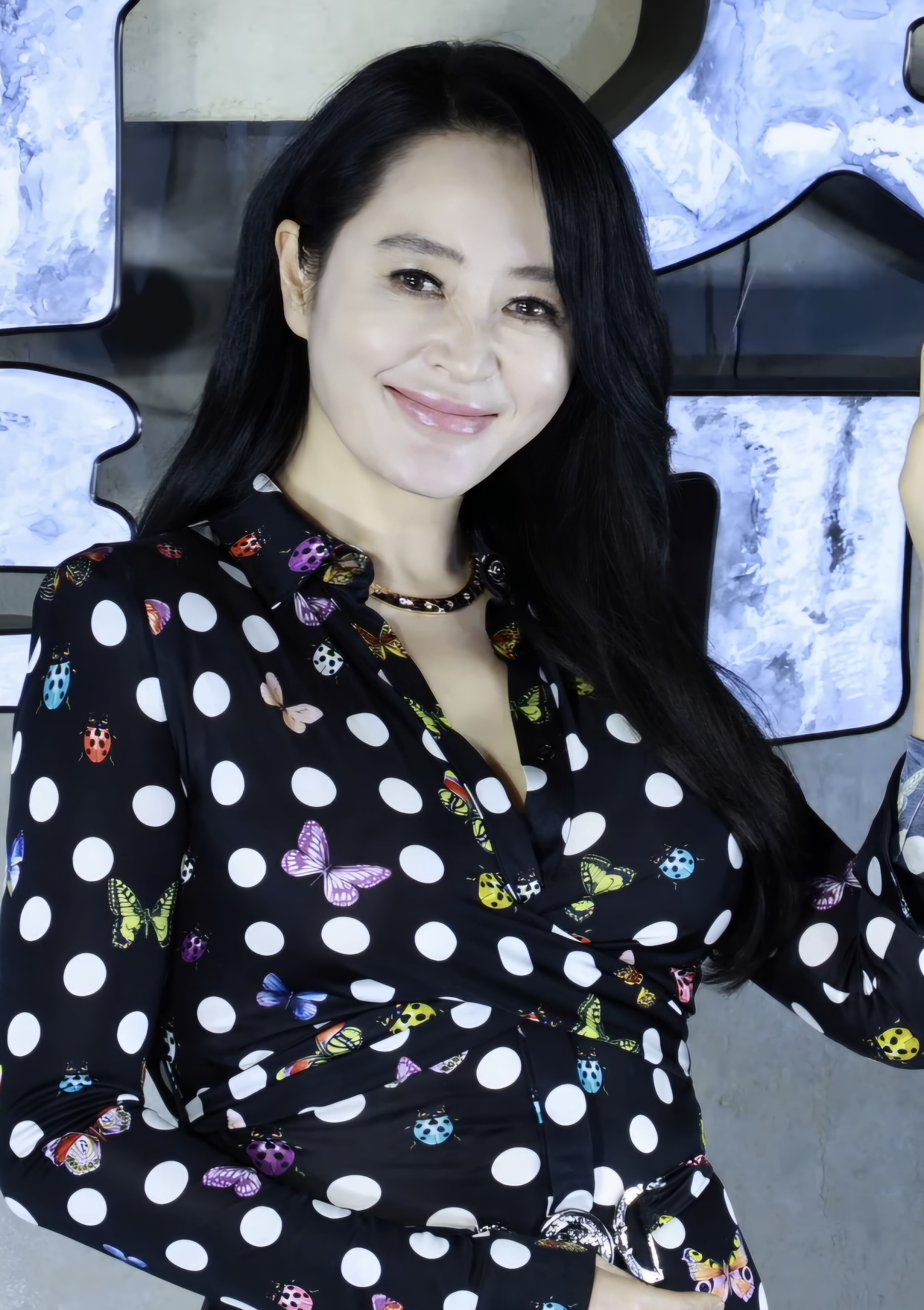
Kim in 2023

In March 2022, Kim gained international recognition for her lead role as judge Shim Eun-seok in the Netflix series Juvenile Justice, the most popular non-English show for two weeks straight. She was nominated for Best Actress at the 58th Baeksang Arts Awards. The same year she starred in the tvN historical drama Under the Queen's Umbrella as Queen Im Hwa-ryeong.

In 2023, Kim starred in 'Smuggling'. The film surpassed 5 million admissions 36 days after its release, becoming the highest-grossing South Korean summer film of that year. For her performance, received the Best Actress award at the 28th Chunsa International Film Festival, in eight years.

== Personal life ==
=== Public image and character ===
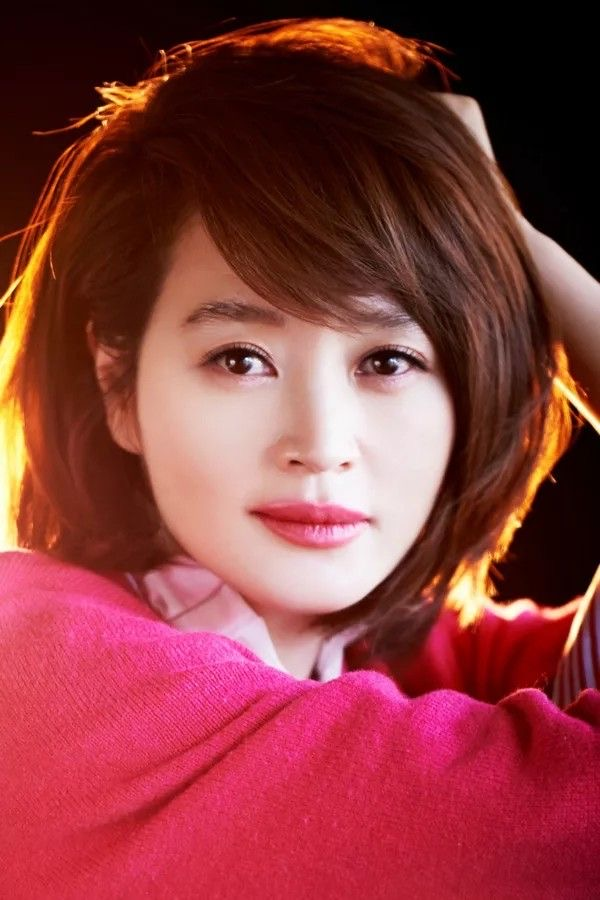
Kim in 2022

Kim has been a popular Korean sex symbol since she wore a low-cut dress as a Blue Dragon Film Awards host and Best Actress winner in 1993, and came to epitomize the era's sexual revolution.

Kim is known for caring about younger actors, and has been described by co-star Ma Dong-seok in Familyhood (2016) to be "the most considerate person to care for others." Her co-star Lee Sang-hee in the TV series Juvenile Justice said "Kim would write down unknown actors' names when she thought their acting was good, so that she could recommend them for suitable scripts in the future." Many actresses had expressed special thanks and gratitude to Kim for her care, including Son Ye-jin, Han Ji-min, Kim Nam-joo, and Yum Jung-ah.

Kim has a bachelor's in theater and film from Dongguk University. In 2013, Kim admitted to having plagiarized her master's thesis "A Study on Actor Communication," with parts copied verbatim from at least four books. She apologized for her actions, which she said stemmed from her busy schedule and ignorance of the seriousness of plagiarism. Kim consequently forfeited her master's degree in journalism and mass communications.

=== Relationships ===
Kim and character actor Yoo Hae-jin first met in 2001 after shooting the film Kick the Moon and became close in 2006 after appearing together in Tazza: The High Rollers. Rumors of the two dating surfaced starting 2008 although both continuously denied any romantic involvement until early 2010 when paparazzi photographs of the two were released, and the couple officially confirmed their relationship. Kim and Yoo broke up in 2011.

== Philanthropy ==
In 2008, Kim donated the full amount of the narration fees of the documentary film "Forgiveness, Are You at the End of the Way" to the crime victim support fund.

In April 2009, Kim displayed her pop art at the Seoul Open Art Fair. One of her collage paintings was sold for ₩5 million, and she donated the sum to charity.

On July 7, 2009, Kim participated in the "Style Meets Art" campaign co-hosted by cable channel OnStyle and Korean National Commission for UNESCO and donated the proceeds of her donated works to the Korean National Commission for UNESCO.

Kim donated ₩100 million for forest fire victims affected by the Goseong Fire of 2019.

In 2020, when the COVID-19 pandemic exposed a shortage of masks, Kim donated ₩100 million to Hope Bridge Disaster Relief Association.

On March 7, 2022, Kim donated ₩100 million to the Hope Bridge Disaster Relief Association to help the victims of the 2022 Uljin and Samcheok wildfire as emergency relief funds.

On August 9, 2022, Kim donated ₩100 million to help those affected by the 2022 South Korean floods through the Hope Bridge Korea Disaster Relief Association.

On February 10, 2023, Kim donated ₩100 million through UNICEF to help children who were effected by 2023 Turkey–Syria earthquake and in the same month Kim posted a photo of the briquette service, which were the briquettes she donated.

On July 17, 2023, Kim donated ₩100 million to aid recovery from the 2023 South Korea floods through Hope Bridge National Disaster Relief Association.

== Filmography ==
=== Film ===
Year	Title		Role	Note	Ref.
Year	English	Korean	Role	Note	Ref.
1986	Ggambo	깜보	Na-young		
1986	My Daughter Saved from the Mire, Part II	수렁에서 건진 내 딸 2	Yu-ri		
1988	Grown-ups Just Don't Understand	어른들은 몰라요	Yu-ra		
1988	That Last Winter	그 마지막 겨울	Young-ae		
1990	Oseam	오세암	Sister Angela		
1991	Lost Love	잃어버린 너	Kim Yoon-hee		
1993	First Love	첫사랑	Park Young-shin		
1994	I Wish for What is Forbidden	나는 소망한다 내게 금지된 것을		Cameo	
1994	Life and Death of the Hollywood Kid	헐리우드 키드의 생애		Cameo	
1994	Blue Seagull	블루시걸	Chae-rin (voice)		
1995	Dr. Bong	닥터봉	Hwang Yeo-shin		
1995	The Eternal Empire	영원한 제국	Yoon Sang-ah		
1995	Bitter and Sweet	남자는 괴로워	Kim Hye-soo		
1997	Change	체인지	Ko Eun-bi	Special appearance	
1997	Mister Condom	미스터 콘돔	Sung-hee		
1998	Too Tired to Die	투 타이어드 투 다이	Anouk		
1998	Tie a Yellow Ribbon	찜	Chae-young		
1999	Doctor K	닥터 K	Dr. Pyo Ji-soo		
2001	Kick the Moon	신라의 달밤	Min Ju-ran		
2002	Three	쓰리	Wife	Segment: "Memories"	
2002	YMCA Baseball Team	YMCA 야구단	Min Jong-rim		
2004	Hypnotized	얼굴없는 미녀	Ji-su		
2005	The Red Shoes	분홍신	Sun-jae		
2006	Tazza: The High Rollers	타짜	Madam Jeong		
2007	A Good Day to Have an Affair	바람 피기 좋은 날	Dew		
2007	Skeletons in the Closet	좋지 아니한가	Mi-kyung		
2007	Eleventh Mom	열한번째 엄마	Woman		
2008	Modern Boy	모던보이	Jo Nan-sil		
2008	Forgiveness	용서	Narrator	Documentary	
2010	Villain and Widow	이층의 악당	Hyun-joo		
2012	The Thieves	도둑들	Pepsee		
2013	The Face Reader	관상	Yeon-hong		
2015	Coin Locker Girl	차이나타운	Ma Woo-hee		
2016	Familyhood	굿바이 싱글	Joo-yeon		
2017	A Special Lady	미옥	Na Hyun-jung		
2018	Default	국가부도의 날	Han Shi-hyeon		
2020	The Day I Died: Unclosed Case	내가 죽던 날	Hyeon-soo		
2023	Smugglers	밀수	Cho Chun-ja		
TBA	Return	귀환	TBA		

=== Television series ===
Year	Title		Role	Note	Ref.
Year	English	Korean	Role	Note	Ref.
1986	Best Selling Theater: "Doll's Classroom"	베스트셀러극장 - 인형의 교실	Oh Hye-sook		
1986	TV Literary Museum: "Young Zelkova Tree"	TV문학관 - 젊은 느티나무			
1987	Samogok	사모곡	Bo-wook		
1988	1988 Summer Olympics Special: "Chunhyangjeon"		Sung Chun-hyang		
1988	Sun Shim-yi	순심이	Sun Shim-yi		
1989	Senoya	세노야	Kang Jung-ae		
1990	Erased Woman	지워진 여자	Jung Soo-min		
1990	When The Flowers Bloom and the Birds Cry	꽃 피고 새 울면	Mi-kyung		
1990	Three Families in One House 2	한지붕 세가족 시즌2	Hye-sook		
1990	Fun World	재미있는 세상	Seo Byung-sook		
1991	Best Theater: "Midsummer Night's Dream"	베스트극장 - 한여름 밤의 꿈			
1991	Best Theater: "Neighbor"	베스트극장 - 이웃집 은이			
1991	Chuseok Special: "Gosu"	추석 특집극 - 고수	Oh Jung-hee		
1991	Rosy Life	장미빛 인생	Chae Jung-seo		
1992	New Year Special: "Cheonsa is a Tomboy"	신년 특집극 - 천사는 말괄량이	Cheon-sa		
1992	Best Theater: "Reasons to Love Someone"	베스트극장 - 누군가를 사랑하려는 이유	Kang-ju		
1992	Rainbow in Mapo	마포 무지개	Park Young-mi		
1993	Pilot	파일럿	Lee Ji-won		
1993	A Woman's Man	여자의 남자	Kim Eun-young		
1994	Dokkaebiga Ganda	창사특집극 - 눈먼 새의 노래	Choi In-young		
1994	Changsa Special: "Song of a Blind Bird"	창사특집극 - 눈먼 새의 노래	Seok Kyung-sook		
1994–1998	Partner	짝	Cha Hae-soon		
1995	Love Pro, Marriage Amateur	사랑과 결혼	Seo Ye-hee		
1995	The Basics of Romance	연애의 기초	Il-young		
1995	Drama Game: "Twilight of the Gods"	드라마게임 - 신들의 황혼			
1996	Oxtail Soup	곰탕			
1996	Scent of Apple Blossoms	사과꽃 향기	Seo Kyung-joo		
1997	Changsa Special: "Young"	창사 특집극 - 새끼	Sun-ju		
1997	Ms. & Mr.	미스&미스터			
1997	Revenge and Passion	복수혈전	Jung Mi-kyung		
1999	Did We Really Love?	우리가 정말 사랑했을까	Lee Shin-young		
1999	Kuk-hee	국희	Min Kuk-hee		
2000	Golden Era	황금시대	Kim/Choi Hee-kyung		
2001	Best Theater: "Dear Hye-soo"	베스트극장 - 사랑하는 혜수 언니	Herself		
2002–2003	Royal Story: Jang Hui-bin	장희빈	Jang Hui-bin		
2004–2005	Han River Ballad	한강수타령	Yoon Ga-young		
2009	Style	스타일	Park Ki-ja		
2010	Home Sweet Home	즐거운 나의 집	Kim Jin-seo		
2011	Cool Guys, Hot Ramen	꽃미남 라면가게	tarot fortuneteller	Cameo (episode 1)	
2013	The Queen of Office	직장의 신	Miss Kim / Kim Jeom-seon		
2016	Signal	시그널	Cha Soo-hyun		
2017	Dr. Romantic	낭만닥터 김사부	Lee Young-jo	Cameo (episodes 20 & 21)	
2020	Hyena	하이에나	Jeong Geum-ja		
2022	Juvenile Justice	소년 심판	Sim Eun-seok		
2022	Under the Queen's Umbrella	슈룹	Queen Im Hwa-ryeong		
2025	Unmasked	트리거	Oh So-ryong		
2026	The Affair Was Just the Beginning	지금 불륜이 문제가 아닙니다	Kyung-hee		
2026	Second Signal	두 번째 시그널	Cha Soo-hyun		

=== Hosting ===
Year	Title	Notes	Ref.
1993–1995	Saturday Saturday Is Fun		
1993–1995; 1997; 1999–2023	Blue Dragon Film Awards (Note: It was broadcast live on KBS 2TV until 2010.and 2011 to 2021, broadcast live on SBS and return to KBS 2 in 2021)	Last hosted at 44th awards in her 30th Anniversary of Hosting the event.	
2010	World Wide Weekly		

== Stage ==
=== Theater ===
Year	Title		Role	Theater	Date	Ref.
Year	English	Korean	Role	Theater	Date	Ref.
1993	Agnes of God	신의 아그네스	Agnes	Grand Theater of the Daehakro Culture and Arts Center in Seoul	March 31 to April 12	
1993	Agnes of God	신의 아그네스	Agnes	Busan Citizens' Center on	April 18 and 19	
1993	Agnes of God	신의 아그네스	Agnes	Daejeon's Yuseong Arts Center	April 25 and 26	
1993	Agnes of God	신의 아그네스	Agnes	Daegu Kyungpook National University Auditorium	May 2 and 3	
1993	Agnes of God	신의 아그네스	Agnes	Masan MBC Hall	May 9 and 10	
1993	Agnes of God	신의 아그네스	Agnes	Ulsan Arts Center	May 16 and 17	
1993	Agnes of God	신의 아그네스	Agnes	Jeonju Arts Center on the	May 23 and 24	
1993	Agnes of God	신의 아그네스	Agnes	Incheon Arts Center	June 7 and 8	

== Discography ==
=== Soundtrack appearances ===
Year	Song title	Notes
2008	"Why Don't You Do Right?"	Track from Modern Boy OST
2008	"Blues of Colors"	Track from Modern Boy OST
2008	"개여울" (Japanese Ver.)	Track from Modern Boy OST
2013	"Love is"	Track from The Queen of Office OST
