= Modern Boy =

- Theatrical release poster
- Hangul: 모던 보이
- RR: Modeon boi
- MR: Modŏn poi
- Directed by: Jung Ji-woo
- Written by: Jung Ji-woo
- Produced by: Kang Woo-suk
- Starring: Park Hae-il; Kim Hye-soo; Kim Nam-gil
- Cinematography: Kim Tae-gyeong
- Edited by: Eom Yun-ju; Wang Su-an
- Music by: Lee Jae-jin
- Distributed by: CJ Entertainment
- Release date: October 2, 2008
- Running time: 121 minutes
- Country: South Korea
- Language: Korean
- Box office: US$3.8 million

Modern Boy (Korean: 모던 보이; RR: Modeon boi) is a 2008 South Korean period drama film written and directed by Jung Ji-woo. It follows a rich, hedonistic playboy (Park Hae-il) who cannot care less that his country was colonized, and falls head over heels in love with a beautiful independence fighter (Kim Hye-soo).

== Plot ==
In 1937, during the Japanese occupation, Lee Hae-myeong, a top-level secretary of the Government-General of Chōsen, becomes instantly captivated by a dancer named Jo Nan-sil, whom he sees for the first time at a secret club he visits with his best friend Shinsuke. After using all sorts of methods, he begins a dreamlike romance with her, but the happiness is short-lived. A lunchbox packed by Nan-sil explodes at the Government-General building, and she vanishes without a trace after ransacking Hae-myeong's home. Desperate to find her, Hae-myeong scours Gyeongseong, only to discover that Nan-sil is a woman of many names, many jobs, and even many lovers. Despite the mounting sense of danger, Haemyung cannot quell his longing for her.

== Cast ==
- Park Hae-il as Lee Hae-myeong
- Kim Hye-soo as Jo Nan-sil
- Kim Nam-gil as Shinsuke Hidaka, Japanese detective
- Kim Joon-bae as Baek Sang-heo
- Kim Young-jae as Okai
- Shin Goo as Lee Hae-myeong's father
- Kwak Min-suk as Japanese detective
- Joo Seok-tae as Policeman
- Hong Seung-jin as Cheol-kwon
- Do Ji-won as Ishida Yoko
- Moon Won-joo as Detective

== Release ==
Modern Boy was released in South Korea on 2 October 2008, and topped the box office on its opening weekend with 329,956 admissions. As of 26 October, the film had received a total of 761,090 admissions, and as of 9 November had grossed a total of $3,839,780.

== Awards and nominations ==
2008 Blue Dragon Film Awards

- Technical Award - Insight Visual
- Nomination - Best Cinematography - Kim Tae-gyeong
- Nomination - Best Art Direction - Jo Sang-gyeong, Park Ju-yeong
- Nomination - Best Music - Lee Jae-jin

2008 Korean Film Awards

- Nomination - Best Art Direction - Jo Sang-gyeong, Park Ju-yeong
- Nomination - Best Music - Lee Jae-jin
- Nomination - Best Sound - Seo Yeong-jun

2009 Grand Bell Awards

- Nomination - Best Supporting Actor - Kim Nam-gil
- Nomination - Best Art Direction - Jo Sang-gyeong
- Nomination - Best Costume Design - Jo Sang-gyeong
- Nomination - Best Visual Effects - Kang Jong-ik, Son Seung-hyeon
- Nomination - Best New Actor - Kim Nam-gil

17th Korean Culture and Entertainment Awards

- won - Best New Actor - Kim Nam-gil
