= The Sweet Sex and Love =

- Film poster
- Hangul: 맛있는 섹스 그리고 사랑
- RR: Masinneun sekseu geurigo sarang
- MR: Masinnŭn seksŭ kŭrigo sarang
- Directed by: Bong Man-dae
- Written by: Bong Man-dae; Kwak Jeong-deok; Lee Soo-nam
- Produced by: Kwak Jeong-deok
- Starring: Kim Sung-soo
- Cinematography: Choi Sang-muk
- Edited by: Moon In-dae
- Music by: Jeong Won-yeong
- Distributed by: Korea Pictures
- Release date: June 27, 2003
- Running time: 90 minutes
- Country: South Korea
- Language: Korean

The Sweet Sex and Love (Korean: 맛있는 섹스 그리고 사랑) is a 2003 South Korean erotic romance film. It was directed by Bong Man-dae and starred Kim Sung-soo and Kim Seo-hyung. The entire score was based on a digitally remastered recording of the works of Bedřich Smetana.

== Cast ==
- Kim Sung-soo
- Kim Seo-hyung
