= Bong Man-dae =

South Korean actor and director (born 1970)

- Born: 1970 (age 55–56); Gwangju, South Korea
- Occupation: Film director

Korean name
- Hangul: 봉만대
- Hanja: 奉萬大
- RR: Bong Mandae
- MR: Pong Mandae

Bong Man-dae (Korean: 봉만대; born 1970) is a South Korean actor, director, and scriptwriter. He is known as a soft-core porn director.

== Biography ==
Bong was born in 1970 in Gwangju, South Korea. Before making his mainstream feature film debut in 2003, Bong directed 15 straight-to-video films which were acknowledged for their strong narratives and stylish visuals. He also directed a TV series which was broadcast in 2004.

== Filmography ==
=== Director ===
- Trap
- Cinderella
- The Sweet Sex and Love

=== Actor ===
- Love, So Divine
- Handphone
- The Sword with No Name

=== Writer ===
- The Sweet Sex and Love
