= Kwon Hyeok-soo (voice actor) =

South Korean voice actor

Kwon Hyeok-soo (Korean: 권혁수; Hanja: 權赫洙) (born on October 9, 1954 in Bucheon, Gyeonggi-do) is a South Korean voice actor and actor. He first made his debut as a stage actor since 1972. He joined the Munhwa Broadcasting Corporation's voice acting division in 1976. Currently, Kwon is cast in the Korea TV Edition of 24 as George Mason (24 character), replacing Xander Berkeley. He has been a freelance actor since 2013.

== Roles ==
=== Broadcast TV dubbing ===
- 24 (replacing Xander Berkeley, Korea TV Edition, MBC)
- Geisters (MBC)
- Chokomi (MBC)

=== Drama ===
- Flower Boys Next Door (tvN)
- Marry Him If You Dare (KBS2)
- Hotel King (MBC)
- Beating Again (JTBC)
- My Horrible Boss (JTBC)
- The Vampire Detective (OCN)
- Monster (MBC)
- Secret Healer (JTBC)
- Something About 1% (Oksusu, Dramax)
- Entourage (tvN)
- Father, I'll Take Care of You (MBC)
- Night Light (MBC)
- The Rebel (MBC)
- Queen of Mystery (KBS2)
- Man to Man (JTBC)
- Bad Thief, Good Thief (MBC)
- Stranger (tvN)
- The Bride of Habaek (tvN)
- Children of the 20th Century (MBC)
- Witch at Court (KBS2)
- Black (OCN)
- Untouchable (JTBC)
- A Korean Odyssey (tvN)
- The Rich Son (MBC)
- Come and Hug Me (MBC)
- Life on Mars (OCN)
- 100 Days My Prince (tvN)
- Room No. 9 (tvN)
- The Crowned Clown (tvN)
- Spring Turns to Spring (MBC)
- Item (MBC)
- The Fiery Priest (SBS)
- He Is Psychometric (tvN)
- Welcome to Waikiki 2 (JTBC)
- The Banker (MBC)
- Special Labor Inspector (MBC)
- Abyss (tvN)
- Search: WWW (tvN)
- Hotel del Luna (tvN)
- When the Camellia Blooms (KBS2)
- Melting Me Softly (tvN)
- Dr. Romantic 2 (SBS)
- Money Game (tvN)
- Hospital Playlist (tvN)
- Mystic Pop-up Bar (JTBC) as Company executive

=== Game dubbing ===
- Overwatch - Reinhardt (replacing Darin De Paul, Korean Edition)
- StarCraft II - Arcturus Mengsk (replacing James Harper, Korean Edition)

=== Film dubbing ===
- Bram Stoker's Dracula (replacing Keanu Reeves, Korea TV Edition, MBC)
- Rush Hour (replacing Jackie Chan, Korea TV Edition, MBC)
- Thunderheart (replacing Val Kilmer, Korea TV Edition, MBC)
- The Ladykillers (replacing Tom Hanks, Korea TV Edition, MBC)

== See also ==
- Munhwa Broadcasting Corporation
- MBC Voice Acting Division
