= Seo Jung-jin =

Seo Jung-jin (Korean: 서정진) can refer to these people:

- Seo Jung-jin (businessman), South Korean businessman and chairman of Celltrion
- Seo Jung-jin (footballer), South Korean footballer
