= Celltrion Entertainment =

South Korean entertainment company

Celltrion Entertainment Co., Ltd.
- Celltrion Entertainment logo
- Native name: 셀트리온 엔터테인먼트
- Formerly: Dream E&M Co., Ltd.
- Type: subsidiary
- Industry: broadcasting; entertainment
- Founded: January 4, 2012
- Founder: Seo Jung-jin
- Headquarters: 11/F KBS Media Center, Digital Media City, 45 Maebongsan-ro, Sangam-dong, Mapo-gu, Seoul, South Korea
- Number of locations: 2
- Area served: South Korea
- Key people: CO-CEOs: Park Jae-sam (TV production), Lee Beom-soo (movie production and artist management)
- Products: TV dramas, other TV programs, films
- Services: TV & movie production artist management
- Total assets: ₩ 228 million (2016)
- Number of employees: 13 (2016)
- Parent: Celltrion
- Website: celltrionenter.com celltrion-ent.com

Celltrion Entertainment Co., Ltd. (Korean: 셀트리온 엔터테인먼트; formerly known as Dream E&M Co., Ltd.) is a South Korean production and artist management company under the Celltrion Group. It was founded on January 4, 2012.

In April 2017, the company merged with artist management agency Thespis Entertainment, owned by Lee Beom-soo.

== Works ==
=== Television ===
==== Scripted ====
Year	Title	Network	Associated Production
2013	Drama Special Series: Sirius	KBS 2TV	KBS Drama Production
2013	Drama Special Series: Their Perfect Day	KBS 2TV	KBS Drama Production
2013	Drama Special Series: Like a Fairytale	KBS 2TV	KBS Drama Production
2013	Drama Special Series: Puberty Medley	KBS 2TV	KBS Drama Production
2013	The Clinic for Married Couples: Love and War Season 2	KBS 2TV	KBS N, Story TV, etc.
2013	The Fugitive of Joseon	KBS 2TV	—N/a
2013	Wang's Family	KBS 2TV	—N/a
2014	Beyond the Clouds	KBS 2TV	—N/a
2014	My Spring Days	MBC TV	Hunus Entertainment
2016	The Master of Revenge	KBS 2TV	Verdi Media
2016	You Are a Gift	SBS TV	SBS Plus
2016	Hello, My Twenties!	JTBC	Drama House & J Content Hub
2016	Person Who Gives Happiness	MBC TV	—N/a
2016	I'm Sorry, But I Love You	SBS TV	—N/a
2017	Tomorrow, With You	tvN	Studio Dragon
2017	Manhole: Wonderland's Feel	KBS 2TV	—N/a
2017	Mad Dog	KBS 2TV	Imagine Asia
2017	Rain or Shine	JTBC	—N/a
2018	Let's Eat 3	tvN	tvN
2019	Vagabond	SBS TV; Netflix	
2019	My Country: The New Age	jtbc	My Country: The New Age SPC
2019	Want a Taste?	SBS TV	SBS Medianet
2020	Memorials	KBS 2TV	Frame Media
2020	Man in a Veil	KBS 2TV	—N/a
2021	Beyond Evil	JTBC	JTBC Studios
2021	Uncle	TV Chosun	HIGROUND; Monster Union
2021	Reflection of You	JTBC	JTBC Studios
2022	Doctor Lawyer	MBC TV	Monjakso
2022	A Model Family	Netflix	Production H
2022	The Empire	JTBC	SLL
2023	Woman in a Veil	KBS 2TV	
2026	Undercover Miss Hong	tvN	Studio Dragon
2026	God's Bead	JTBC	SLL

==== Non-Scripted ====
Year	Title	Network
2012	Mapado: Last Partner Standing Challenge	MBN
2012	Actual Theater Incident Files	MBN
2012	Impressive Real Life Theater	MBN
2012	Sunday Night Magic Concert: This is Magic	MBC TV
2012	Story Jobs	TV Chosun

=== Film ===
Year	Title	Associated Production	Distributor
2019	King of Cycling Uhm Bok-dong	—N/a	self-distributed

== Managed people ==
=== Actors ===
- Lee Beom-soo
- Park Soo-ah
- Shin Ji-hoon (ko)
- Lee Chung-koo
- Kim Kang-hyun
- Lee Ho-cheol (ko)
- Hwang Hee
- Kim Soo-oh
- Park Sang-won

=== Writers ===
- Kim Do-hyun
- Kim Soo-jin
- Kim Hee-jae (ko)
- Nam Sun-nyeon
- Park Ji-sook
- Park Hyung-jin
- Ahn Hong-ran
- Yoo Bo-ra
- Yoon Hee-jung
- Lee Jae-gon
- Im Soo-mi
- Jang Young-chul
- Jung Kyung-soon
- Jung Hyun-min
- Chae Seung-dae
- Heo Sung-hye
- Hwang Jin-young
