= Star Golden Bell =

South Korean television series

- Poster for Star Golden Bell
- Hangul: 스타골든벨
- RR: Seuta goldeun bel
- MR: Sŭt'a koldŭn pel
- Genre: Reality television, quiz
- Written by: Ji Hyun Sook; Kim Sae Hwa; Jung Yoon Hee; Lee Ji Hyun; Yang Hye In; Choi Jung Hwan
- Directed by: Han Kyung Chul; Lee Kyung Yoon; Jung Mi Young
- Starring: Jee Seok-jin; Jun Hyun-moo; Lee Chae-young; 20 guests
- Country of origin: South Korea
- Original language: Korean
- No. of episodes: 311

Production
- Camera setup: Multicamera setup
- Running time: Approximately 80 minutes

Original release
- Network: KBS2
- Release: November 7, 2004 – November 20, 2010

Star Golden Bell (Korean: 스타골든벨) was a South Korean variety show broadcast on KBS. A popular show, it occasionally entered the Korean top 20 chart. The show consisted of mini-games, which have certain prize amounts. The winning celebrity is given the opportunity to ring the bell by correctly answering a riddle. If he or she is correct, the money is donated in the winner's name. All "winnings" go to a charity of KBS's choice; the last donation, in the amount of $110,000, was made on July 1, 2008. In addition to the main MC, Jun Hyun-moo, there were two additional hosts, Kim Je-dong and Lee Chae-young, who were either in charge of administering games or were challengers competing against the celebrity contestants. Star featured 5 lines of 4 people each (the lines named after each Korean character) which had various celebrities from music, film, television, and musicals. The last line ("Bell") contains regularly appearing celebrities.

In April 2009, it was announced that the show would be undergoing a spring overhaul, with main host Jee Seok-jin (지석진) and MC Oh Jeong-yeon leaving the show. Their replacements are host Jun Hyun-moo and actress Lee Chae-young.

== Format ==
Since the beginning of the show, Star Golden Bell has evolved from single line challenges (games involving one team at a time) to group line challenges (games involving the lines going against each other), although it has since moved to a mixture of game types. Star Golden Bell has four "stages" of gameplay in which celebrities can win money to donate. At the end of the first three stages, three contestants were picked to play the fourth stage in order to win the pot.

As of April 2009, the show features four main stages after a lengthy introduction of the various guests; each stage win adds money to a pot that can be "won" at the end of the game. The first features Nicole from Kara playing a version of a word guessing game with each line; due to her relative inexperience with the Korean language, the segment has become popular among viewers.

The second segment was a fill-in-the-blank guessing game, in which the lines compete against each other to find missing characters in a set of four words, which reveal a new word or term. Each win results in guests winning food prizes. The next segment determines the potential "Golden Bell" ringer in the form of a matching game, in which the guests have to match various objects to each other, an example being singers with their hit singles. Unlike its initial version, the game is open to any guest. Currently, the second segment consists of a dictionary game, in which MC Hyeon Mu and MC Chaeyeon give hints to each line in order for them to guess the word. In the first hint, the two MC's act out a scenario, many of which have Hyeon Mu wearing ridiculous wigs and various other outfits. If the line does not guess the correct word, they move onto a second hit, for a smaller dollar amount. This time, a dictionary definition is read. Previously, the positions of the first and second hints were switched. If the word still has not been guessed, a third, less-valuable hint is given, in which the consonants of the word are shown.

The final segment, which has remained unchanged, has the winner of the third segment answering a difficult riddle or trivia question. If the question is answered correctly, the amount in the pot is deposited into the donation pot. If the question is answered incorrectly, the day's amount is lost.

== Former hosts ==
Since its debut, the show has undergone many cast changes, as Lee Hyuk-jae, former anchorwoman Noh Hyun-jung (who married in mid-2006 and moved to the United States), newscaster Park Ji-yoon, Yoon Soo-yeong, Oh Jeong-yeon, and Jee Seok-jin have all left the show as of April 2009. However, Jee Seok-jin made a comeback to the show to replace Kim Je-dong, who left the show after 4 years as MC of the program.

== Cancelation ==
After a long journey, the show officially came to an end on its 311th episode due to low ratings. The show was replaced with another program with a similar concept, 100 Out of 100 (백점 만점), also known as Oh My School!.

To celebrate Seollal in 2015 a Goat themed episode was filmed and featured notable personalities from past episodes such as first-generation idol group members Danny Ahn from g.o.d and Eun Ji-won from Sechs Kies, comedian Heo Kyung-hwan, Lee Chae-young (former MC). Other guests included comedienne Lee Guk-joo, Amber Liu from f(x), Niel, and Chanyeol from Exo.
