= Seo Seung-ah =

South Korean actress (born 1983)

- Born: Lee Na-young; December 18, 1983 (age 42); Seoul, South Korea
- Occupations: Actress; VJ
- Years active: 2001–present
- Height: 1.65 m (5 ft 5 in)
- Spouse: Jeong Jin-su (m. 2010)
- Relatives: Lee Chae-young (younger sister)

- Seo Seung-ah
- Hangul: 이나영
- RR: I Nayeong
- MR: I Nayŏng

Stage name
- Hangul: 서승아
- RR: Seo Seunga
- MR: Sŏ Sŭnga

Seo Seung-ah (Korean: 서승아; born December 18, 1983) is a South Korean actress. She made her debut in the 2001 film Running Seven Dogs and TV drama series School 4. She is the older sister of Lee Chae-young. Seo is currently working as a VJ.

== Personal life ==
Seo was in a relationship with actor Ahn Yong-joon in 2009 but broke up after 2 years due to an unconfirmed reason. She married Jeong Jin-su on June 19, 2010.

== Filmography ==
=== TV dramas ===
- 2001: School 4

=== Films ===
- 2001: Running Seven Dogs
