= Lee Chae-young =

South Korean actress (born 1986)

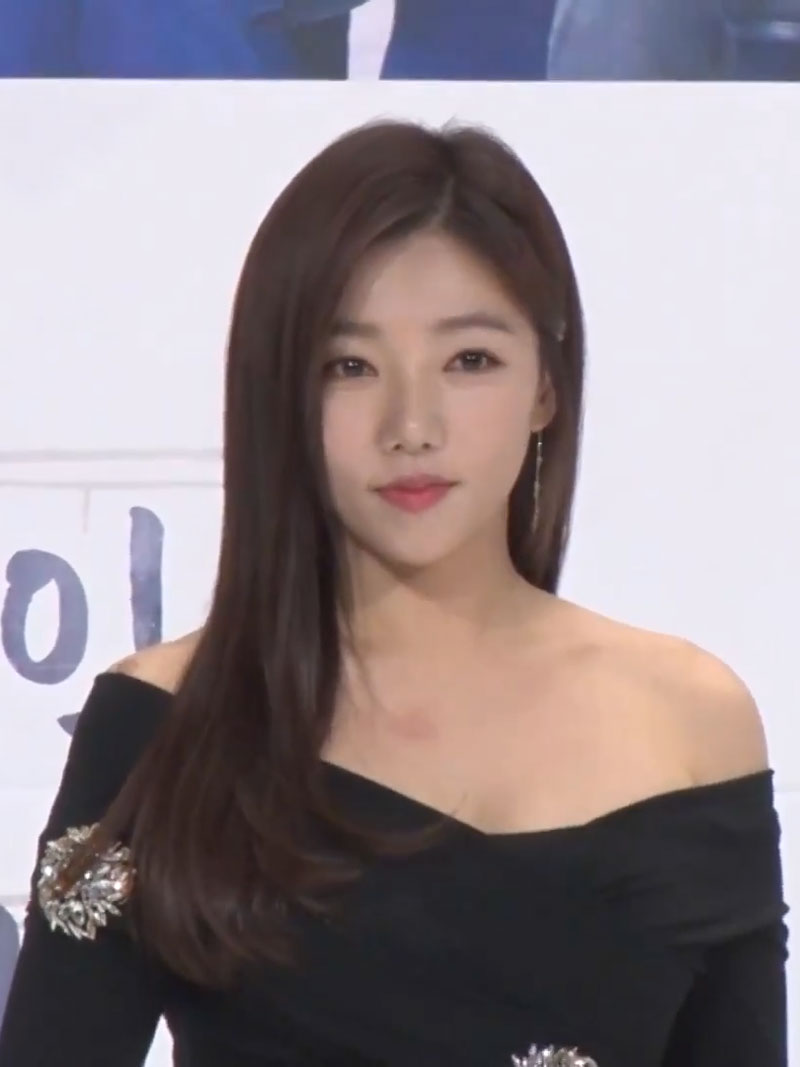
- Lee in A Poem a Day press conference, March 2018
- Born: Lee Bo-young; April 29, 1986 (age 40); Seoul, South Korea
- Other name: Little Jang
- Education: Dankook University
- Occupations: Actress; model; host
- Years active: 2003–present
- Agent(s): Snowball Entertainment (2015–2018); Sidus HQ (2018–present)
- Television: Star Golden Bell
- Height: 1.7 m (5 ft 7 in)
- Relatives: Seo Seung-ah (older sister)

Korean name
- Hangul: 이보영
- Hanja: 李寶英
- RR: I Boyeong
- MR: I Poyŏng

Stage name
- Hangul: 이채영
- Hanja: 李倸英
- RR: I Chaeyeong
- MR: I Ch'aeyŏng

Lee Chae-young (Korean: 이채영; born April 29, 1986) is a South Korean actress. She debuted in a music video called "Come On" by the Hip-hop group Turtles in 2003. The following year, she appeared in Rain's "I Do" music video and in 2007, Yoon Mi-rae's "Did You Forget It". Her first television drama was Witch Yoo Hee, a romantic comedy, as Chef Marie. It wasn't until she was cast as Sa Illa in the 2009 historical drama Iron Empress and took the role as a host on the Korean Broadcasting System (KBS) variety show Star Golden Bell that her popularity rose. She is a Dankook University graduate and the younger sister of Seo Seung-ah.

== Personal life ==
Lee attended Mirim Girls' High School during her youth, and later attended Dankook University. Her hobbies include swimming and judo.

She is sometimes referred to as "Little Jang"; the nickname originated because of her resemblance to actress Jang Jin-young.

== Early life and career ==
=== 2003–07: Debut and Witch Yoo Hee ===
She made her debut in the hip-hop group Turtles' "Come On" music video from the album Turtles 2 in 2003. In 2004, she appeared in Rain's "I Do" music video as his girl and is seen waiting for him in a restaurant at the end of the video. Appearing in two more music video, Air Rise's "Away" and Yoon Mi Rae's "Did You Forget It", she made her first television drama in 2007. Her first television drama was Witch Yoo Hee as Chef Marie and later that year; she appeared in Find My Son, Sam Man Ri.

=== 2008–10: Life is Cool and Iron Empress ===
In 2008, she landed her first movie role in Life is Cool which also happen to be the first rotoscoped movie in South Korea. She was cast as Han Saet Byeol in her second movie, Truck, starring Yoo Hae Jin. Her popular began to rise even more when she was cast as Sa Illa in the 2009 historical drama, Iron Empress. Her character joins the leading character, Empress Cheonchu, and played a supportive role throughout the story. She and Jeon Hyeon-moo took over as host of Star Golden Bell when the show was going through changes. In 2008, she made an appearance in the Homme music video, "I Was Able to Eat Well", as a girl who causes Lee Hyun and Changmin to fight over her. She accepted modeling deals with DL1961, Apple Hip and Men's Health.

=== 2011–present: Royal Family, "Man Should Laugh" and Miracle ===
In 2011, she was cast in the drama Royal Family as Park Min Kyeong and modeled for 11th Street for 4th modeling shoot. She was chosen with Park Han Byul, Lee Tae Im, Jang Ji Eun and Jun Eun Mi in a promotion group called the Ocean Girls for the water park Ocean World. In July, she appeared Homme's second music video "Man Should Laugh" and it shows the love triangle turning into a serious fight. Her latest movie is Bicycle Looking for a Whale (or Miracle) as Yeong Chae, it was released on September 22.

In August 2018, Lee signed with new management agency SidusHQ.

== Filmography ==
=== TV series ===
- 2007: Witch Yoo Hee – Chef Marie
- 2007: Find My Son, Sam Man Ri – Song Hee-joo
- 2009: Empress Cheonchu – Sa Il-la
- 2009: Soul Special – Min Se-hee
- 2009: Wife Returns – Min Yi Hyun
- 2010: Legend of the Patriots – Dan-yeong
- 2011: Royal Family – Park Min-kyeong
- 2012: The Birth of a Family – Ma Ye-ri
- 2014: Two Mothers – Lee Hwa-young
- 2015: More Than a Maid – Ga Hee-ah
- 2017: The Emperor: Owner of the Mask – Mae Chang
- 2018: A Poem a Day – Kim Yoon-joo
- 2018: My Strange Hero – a bride (cameo, ep. 1)
- 2019: Home for Summer – Joo Sang-mi
- 2020–2021: Man in a Veil – Han Yoo-ra
- 2023 : Woman in a Veil – Joo Ae-ra
- 2023 : Family: The Unbreakable Bond - Yoon Chae-ri

=== Variety shows ===
- 2009: Star Golden Bell – Host
- 2010: A Guy Who Reads Baseball
- 2010: Wonder Woman
- 2011: Show Show Show
- 2019: King Of Mask Singer
- 2021: Korea's Chicken Battle – judge
- 2021: Cooking - The Birth of a Cooking King – Contestant
- 2022–present: Goal Girl – Cast Member (Season 3)

=== Films ===
- 2008: Life is Cool – Kim Mi-young
- 2008: Truck – Han Saet-byeol
- 2009: Flight – Soo-ah
- 2011: Bicycle Looking for a Whale/Miracle – Yeong-chae
- 2012: The Grand Heist – Seol-hwa
- 2013: Secretly, Greatly – Ran
- 2013: The Devil Rider – Seoyeon
- 2015: The Mirror
- 2020: The cursed lesson - Hyo Jung
- 2021: Tomb of the River
- 2021 : Lady Gambler – Mimi
- 2022: The Killer: A Girl Who Deserves to Die

=== Music video appearances ===
- 2003: Turtles – "Come On"
- 2004: Rain – "I Do"
- 2004: Air Rise – "Away"
- 2007: Yoon Mi-rae – "Did You Forget It"
- 2008: Natural – "보내는 마음"
- 2009: Lee Soo Young – "I Erase It"
- 2009: Hwayobi – "Once"
- 2009: K.Will – "사랑한단 말을 못해서"
- 2010: Rumble Fish – "남잔 다 그래"
- 2010: Kim Dong Hee – "죽을것같아"
- 2010: Homme – "I Was Able to Eat Well"
- 2011: Ocean Girls – "Ride Now"
- 2011: Homme – "Man Should Laugh"

== TV commercials / endorsements ==
- Lotte Confectionery
- SK Telecom
- CJ
- Lihom

== Modeling ==
- 11th Street
- Men's Health
- Apple Hip
- DL1961 Premium Jeans
- Maxim

== Awards and nominations ==
Year	Award	Category	Work	Result	Ref.
2014	KBS Drama Awards	Best Supporting Actress	Two Mothers	Won	
2020	KBS Drama Awards	Excellence Award, Actress in a Daily Drama	Man in a Veil	Won	
2021	7th APAN Star Awards	Excellence Award, Actress in a Serial Drama	Man in a Veil	Nominated	
