= Man in a Veil =

2020 South Korean television series

- Promotional poster
- Hangul: 비밀의 남자
- Hanja: 秘密의 男子
- Lit.: Secret Man
- RR: Bimirui namja
- MR: Pimirŭi namja
- Genre: Melodrama; Revenge
- Created by: KBS Drama Production
- Written by: Lee Jung-dae
- Directed by: Shin Chang-seok
- Starring: Kang Eun-tak; Uhm Hyun-kyung; Lee Chae-young; Lee Shi-kang
- Music by: Choi Chul-ho
- Opening theme: "Secret Man" by Choi Chul-ho and Lee So-ri
- Country of origin: South Korea
- Original language: Korean
- No. of episodes: 105 (Note: Originally scheduled to air for 100 episodes, the series was extended by five episodes due to its popularity.)

Production
- Executive producers: Moon Joon-ha; KBS Media
- Producers: Park Jae sam Choi Jeong-eun
- Camera setup: Single-camera
- Running time: 40 minutes
- Production company: Celltrion Entertainment

Original release
- Network: KBS2
- Release: 7 September 2020 – 10 February 2021

Related
- Woman in a Veil

Man in a Veil (Korean: 비밀의 남자; RR: Bimirui namja) is a South Korean television series starring Kang Eun-tak and Uhm Hyun-kyung. The series aired on KBS2 from 7 September 2020 to 10 February 2021.

It was supposed to start on 31 August 2020, but was postponed for a week due to the COVID-19 pandemic.

== Synopsis ==
This drama tells the story of a man with seven-year-old intelligence after an accident, the love and desires of two women surrounding him, and those facing dreamlike miracles on the threshold of death.

Lee Tae Poong (Kang Eun Tak) has the intelligence level of a seven-year-old after an accident. Meanwhile, Han Yoo Jung (Uhm Hyun Kyung) is a person with a happy personality who dreams of becoming an announcer. But because her family is poor she has to let go of her dream and start working to provide for her family. She also deals with the guilt of her twin sister's wrongdoings.

== Cast ==
=== Main ===
- Kang Eun-tak as Lee Taepung / Yoo Min-hyuk
  - Jo Yong-jin as young Lee Tae-poong
- Uhm Hyun-kyung as Han Yujeong
  - Kim Da-in as young Han Yoo-jung
- Lee Chae-young as Han Yura
  - Yoon Seo-jin as young Han Yoo-ra
- Lee Shi-kang as Cha Seojun
  - Choi Yoon-woo as young Cha Seo-joon

=== Supporting ===
==== Lee Tae-poong's family ====
- Yang Mi-kyung as Lee Kyung-hye
- Lee Il-hwa as Yoon Soo-hui / Seo Ji-sook
- Chae Bin as Kang Ye-jin
- Lee Myung-ho as Kang Sang-tae

==== Han Yoo-jung and Han Yoo-ra's family ====
- Choi Jae-sung as Han Dae-chul
- Kim Eun-soo as Yeo Sook-ja
- Jang Tae-hun as Han Yoo-myung
  - Ian Cho as young Yoo-myung
- Seo Woo-jin as Han Dong-ho / Lee Min-woo
- Bae Do-hwan as Yeo Bong-joon

==== Cha Seo-joon's family ====
- Hong Il-kwon as Cha Woo-seok
- Kim Hee-jung as Joo Hwa-yeon
- Kim Yoon-kyung as Cha Mi-ri
- Lee Jeong-yong as Koo Chun-soo

=== Others ===
- Kim Jong-don as Baek Min-won
- Choi Ji-young as Eom Hae-soo
- Na Woo-ho as Song Jin-ho
- Song Seung-ha as Yoo-ra's fellow announcer #1
- Kim Ga-ran as Yoo-ra's fellow announcer #2
- Baek Jae-jin as private detective hired by Yoo-ra
- Lee Chae-hyun as Kim Min-joon
- Yoo Yong as Detective Lee Hyuk-jae
- Kim Kyung-min as Park Tae-soo
- Choi Min-geum as Sook-ja's aunt
- Hong Seung-bum as Lawyer Min
- Yoon Duk-yong as Kim Bong-wan
- Na Suk-min as man who guarded Woo-seok's hospital room
- Lee Seong-jae as Woo-seok's doctor

=== Special appearances ===
- Eru as Choi Joon-seok (Ep. 1-10, 15-16, 72-75, 102-105)
- Lee Jin-woo as Kang Sang-hyeon (Ep. 1-16)
- Hong Seok-cheon as Radio PD who helps Yoo-ra (Ep. 1)
- Yun Da-yeong as Park Na-yeong (Ep. 1-2, 8, 29-30, 53-55)
- Park Hyeon-jeong as Mi Ah-jeong (Ep. 1-3)
- Kim Hyun-sook as Na-yeong's mother (Ep. 2, 8)
- Lee Joo-eun as Song Ji-yeon (Ep. 3-4)
- Kim Do-kyeong as Driver Kim / Choi Ji-seok (Ep. 8-12)
- Romina as foreign woman in the hospital (Ep. 20)
- Ryu Ji-kwang as DL Group model (Ep. 74)
- Lee Sang-joon as a delivery man (Ep. 99)

== Original soundtrack ==
Man in a Veil (Original Television Soundtrack)

Soundtrack album by various artists
- Released: January 27, 2021
- Recorded: 2020–2021
- Genres: Soundtrack; ballad; K-pop
- Length: 40:25
- Language: Korean
- Label: Leon Korea

Singles from Man in a Veil
- 1. "Breathe Me" Released: September 17, 2020; 2. "Lean On My Shoulder" Released: September 24, 2020; 3. "Love, Once" Released: December 2, 2020; 4. "It's Fortunate" Released: December 10, 2020

The following is the official track list of Man in a Veil (Original Television Soundtrack) album. The tracks with no indicated lyricists and composers are the drama's musical score; the artists indicated for these tracks are the tracks' composers themselves. Singles included on the album were released from September 17, 2020, to December 10, 2020.

No.	Title	Lyrics	Music	Artist	Length
1.	"Breathe Me" (숨만 쉬는 나)	Yoo Sung-kyu (Noblesse)	Taibian	Choi Hyun-joon (V.O.S)	3:39
2.	"Lean On My Shoulder" (어깨에 기대)	U-LU; 8Hoop	U-LU; 8Hoop	Tim	3:58
3.	"Love, Once" (사랑, 그 한번)	Seo Ui-seong	Seo Ui-seong	Ban Gwang-ok	3:41
4.	"It's Fortunate" (다행이야)	AIMING; Kang Min-hoon	AIMING; Kang Min-hoon	Sung-min	4:24
5.	"Devil's Tango"			Choi Chul-ho; Lee So-ri	0:52
6.	"Secret Man" (Man in a Veil Title Full Version)			Choi Chul-ho; Lee So-ri	2:20
7.	"You And Me"			Choi Chul-ho; Lee So-ri	3:32
8.	"Melody On Guitar"			Choi Chul-ho; Oh Hye-joo	2:19
9.	"Gloomy"			Choi Chul-ho; Lee So-ri; Lee Yong-seok	4:24
10.	"Ambition"			Lee So-ri	1:50
11.	"Sad Story"			Choi Chul-ho; Oh Hye-joo	2:10
12.	"Long Way"			Choi Chul-ho; Oh Hye-joo	3:09
13.	"Irreversible"			Choi Chul-ho; Lee So-ri	1:37
14.	"My Everything"			Lee So-ri	2:36
Total length:					40:25

== Viewership ==
The last episode had more than 3 million views nationwide (3,502,000) and 1,789,000 in the capital, Seoul.

- In this table, the blue numbers represent the lowest ratings and the red numbers represent the highest ratings.
- N/A denotes that the rating is not known.

2020
Ep.	Original broadcast date	TNmS	Nielsen Korea	
Ep.	Original broadcast date	Nationwide	Nationwide	Seoul
1	7 September	14.0%	10.4%	9.3%
2	8 September	12.9%	11.1%	10.7%
3	9 September	14.0%	11.4%	9.8%
4	10 September	13.8%	10.7%	9.3%
5	11 September	13.9%	11.4%	10.1%
6	14 September	14.1%	11.0%	9.7%
7	15 September	14.8%	12.6%	10.9%
8	16 September	15.8%	12.9%	11.3%
9	17 September	14.9%	13.0%	10.9%
10	18 September	14.3%	12.0%	10.0%
11	21 September	15.0%	12.3%	10.7%
12	22 September	14.9%	12.1%	10.4%
13	23 September	14.8%	11.7%	10.0%
14	24 September	14.1%	12.1%	10.4%
15	25 September	13.3%	11.2%	9.4%
16	28 September	12.7%	11.1%	10.2%
17	29 September	13.6%	10.9%	9.2%
18	30 September	13.0%	11.4%	9.8%
19	5 October	14.2%	11.8%	10.3%
20	6 October	14.2%	13.1%	12.0%
21	7 October	15.8%	14.3%	12.2%
22	8 October	17.0%	14.4%	13.0%
23	9 October	15.2%	13.5%	11.4%
24	12 October	14.8%	15.1%	13.6%
25	13 October	16.7%	15.1%	13.8%
26	14 October	16.2%	14.8%	13.1%
27	15 October	16.1%	14.5%	12.6%
28	19 October	16.4%	14.2%	12.3%
29	20 October	17.0%	14.5%	12.4%
30	21 October	15.8%	14.6%	11.6%
31	22 October	16.0%	15.5%	13.7%
32	23 October	16.6%	15.2%	13.2%
33	26 October	16.4%	15.1%	13.2%
34	27 October	16.9%	15.0%	13.0%
35	28 October	17.1%	14.8%	12.6%
36	29 October	17.6%	15.5%	13.5%
37	30 October	17.4%	14.8%	13.1%
38	3 November	18.0%	15.9%	14.6%
39	4 November	17.0%	14.7%	12.3%
40	6 November	16.0%	13.9%	11.7%
41	9 November	16.8%	15.0%	12.7%
42	11 November	16.8%	15.0%	13.1%
43	12 November	16.0%	14.8%	12.7%
44	13 November	16.6%	14.7%	12.6%
45	16 November	17.9%	15.1%	12.9%
46	17 November	14.5%	15.0%	13.1%
47	18 November	18.7%	15.5%	13.2%
48	19 November	18.3%	16.4%	14.3%
49	23 November	17.8%	16.0%	13.9%
50	25 November	17.7%	16.1%	14.3%
51	26 November	18.3%	15.9%	13.4%
52	27 November	17.6%	15.9%	14.7%
53	30 November	17.5%	17.0%	15.0%
54	1 December	17.4%	17.1%	14.5%
55	2 December	18.1%	16.7%	14.2%
56	3 December	19.5%	17.0%	15.2%
57	4 December	18.1%	16.8%	14.6%
58	7 December	19.6%	17.3%	15.0%
59	8 December	21.1%	17.4%	15.1%
60	9 December	20.1%	17.7%	15.4%
61	10 December	19.9%	17.5%	15.3%
62	11 December	19.6%	16.8%	15.1%
63	14 December	19.6%	17.7%	15.1%
64	15 December	20.1%	18.5%	16.5%
65	16 December	19.8%	17.9%	15.6%
66	17 December	18.9%	17.9%	16.0%
67	18 December	17.8%	17.9%	16.1%
68	21 December	19.3%	18.8%	16.6%
69	22 December	21.1%	18.8%	16.4%
70	23 December	19.6%	18.5%	16.2%
71	24 December	19.3%	17.8%	15.9%
72	25 December	20.0%	17.9%	16.0%
73	28 December	12.0%	19.8%	17.5%
74	29 December	20.8%	19.5%	17.0%
75	30 December	18.3%	19.1%	16.9%
76	31 December	16.2%	18.3%	15.9%
2021
77	1 January	20.4%	18.9%	17.0%
78	4 January	20.9%	19.1%	16.6%
79	5 January	22.0%	19.3%	16.9%
80	6 January	21.3%	18.7%	15.8%
81	7 January	21.8%	19.7%	16.8%
82	8 January	21.4%	20.1%	17.6%
83	11 January	20.2%	19.2%	17.5%
84	12 January	20.7%	19.6%	17.3%
85	13 January	21.1%	19.5%	16.9%
86	14 January	21.1%	18.8%	15.9%
87	15 January	20.8%	18.1%	15.4%
88	18 January	20.8%	19.3%	16.2%
89	19 January	22.1%	19.1%	16.7%
90	20 January	21.8%	18.9%	16.3%
91	21 January	21.6%	19.3%	16.8%
92	22 January	21.1%	19.8%	17.4%
93	25 January	20.8%	19.5%	17.3%
94	26 January	21.7%	20.4%	17.9%
95	27 January	21.7%	19.4%	17.1%
96	28 January	23.1%	19.4%	16.9%
97	29 January	22.5%	19.8%	17.3%
98	1 February	23.0%	20.1%	16.5%
99	2 February	23.4%	21.2%	18.9%
100	3 February	22.9%	20.2%	17.7%
101	4 February	21.2%	19.6%	17.0%
102	5 February	22.8%	19.9%	17.3%
103	8 February	22.2%	19.7%	17.1%
104	9 February	23.1%	20.5%	17.9%
105	10 February	22.4%	21.3%	18.7%
Average		18.12%	16.32%	14.23%

== Awards and nominations ==
Year	Award	Category	Recipient	Result
2020	KBS Drama Awards	Excellence Award, Actor in a Daily Drama	Kang Eun-tak	Won
2020	KBS Drama Awards	Excellence Award, Actress in a Daily Drama	Lee Chae-young	Won
