= The Empire (South Korean TV series) =

2022 South Korean television series

- Promotional poster
- Hangul: 디 엠파이어: 법의 제국
- Lit.: The Empire: Empire of Law
- RR: Di empaieo: beobui jeguk
- MR: Ti emp'aiŏ: pŏbŭi cheguk
- Genre: Legal drama; Crime
- Created by: SLL
- Written by: Oh Ga-gyu
- Directed by: Yoo Hyeon-gi
- Starring: Kim Sun-a; Ahn Jae-wook; Lee Mi-sook
- Music by: Park Seong-il (Studio Curiosity); Koo Seung-pil (Music Supervisor)
- Country of origin: South Korea
- Original language: Korean
- No. of episodes: 16

Production
- Executive producers: Park Soo-hwa; Yoon Yoon-jin
- Producers: Park Jae-sam; Lee Seung-hee; Hwang Ra-kyung
- Production companies: Celltrion Entertainment; SLL

Original release
- Network: JTBC
- Release: September 24 – November 13, 2022

The Empire (Korean: 디 엠파이어: 법의 제국) is a South Korean television series starring Kim Sun-a, Ahn Jae-wook, and Lee Mi-sook. It premiered on JTBC on September 24, 2022, and aired every Saturday and Sunday at 22:30 (KST). It is also available for streaming on Viu in selected regions.

== Synopsis ==
A series that depicts the scandalous scandals of the nation's top law-abiding aristocrats dreaming of hereditary succession.

== Cast ==
=== Main ===
- Kim Sun-a as Han Hye-ryul

Head of the Special Division of the Seoul Central District Prosecutor's Office. First daughter of Han Gun-do and Ham Kwang-jeon.

- Ahn Jae-wook as Na Geun-woo

A law school professor, Han Gun-do's and Ham Kwang-jeon's son-in-law and Han Hye-ryul's husband.

- Lee Mi-sook as Ham Kwang-jeon

Director of Minguk University Law School, daughter of Ham Min-heon, Han Gun-do's Wife.

- Song Young-chang as Han Gun-do

Lawyer representing Ham & Lee's law firm, Ham Kwang-jeon's husband.

- Shin Goo as Ham Min-heon

Ham Kwang-jeon's father, Lee Ae-heon's husband.

- Oh Hyun-kyung as Lee Ae-heon

Ham Min-heon's wife.

=== Supporting ===
==== Han Hye-ryul's family ====
- Kwon Ji-woo as Han Kang-baek

Han Hye-ryul's son, Minguk University Law School's student.

- Kim Jung-woon as Han Moo-ryul

The second daughter of Han Gun-do and Ham Kwang-jeon, a judge of the Central District Court.

- Choi Jung-woon as Han Kang-ye

Na Geun-woo and Han Hye-ryul's daughter.

==== Minguk University Law School ====
- Joo Se-bin as Hong Nan-hee

Nan-hee, who dreams of saving the world and saving lives, is an engineer. After her father died, she attended Minguk University Law School. She seeks revenge against the Han Family for the death of her father.

- Jung Jae-oh as Jung Kyung-yoon

He is well thought out, smart and capable, therefore, his grade was always at the top. The teacher liked it because of his bright and friendly personality.

- Lee Ga-eun as Jang Ji-yi

Jang Il's only daughter, has interacted with Hye-ryul's family since childhood. She never doubted that one day she would marry Han Kang-baek.

- Bang Joo-hwan as Yoo Hyun

He grew up in a single-mother family. He knew from the beginning that crying and being angry at what could not be helped was the opposite. Sometimes he felt that the judge was not suitable for his age.

- Kwon So-yi as Lee Ah-jeong

Nan-hee's roommate with an undeniable shy personality and very suffocating because of observing others. It is most convenient to blame others and blame yourself.

- Kim Young-woong as Hwang Yong-ji

Lecturer at the Faculty of Law, Minguk University's fellow professor of Na Geun-woo who teaches criminal law and criminal procedural law.

- Kim Gyun-ha as Yoon Gu-ryung

After conscription, he went to Minguk University Law School. His grades gradually declined, and he was eventually suspended from school for the second year. He had to study with his juniors.

==== Prosecutor's office ====
- Lee Moon-sik as Jang Il

Seoul Central District Attorney's Office. The position he was currently sitting in was not a place where skill and luck were sufficient, so Jang Il is someone with more alpha positive.

- Kim Hyung-mook as Go Won-kyung

Seoul Central District Attorney's Office Department of Corruption Investigation. Hye-ryul's ex-husband and Kang-baek's biological father.

- Han Joon-woo as Oh Sung-hyun

Anti-Corruption Investigation Prosecutor of the Seoul Central District Prosecutor's Office.

==== Police station figures ====
- Park Jin-woo as Ji Gu-won

As a police officer under the supervision of the prosecution, have set a corner with the prosecutor in every case relegated, returned to Seoul with difficulty. He encountered a once-in-a-lifetime event.

- Woo Ji-hyun as Wang Jung-jin

He's a pretty good detective and is Ji Gu-won's partner in various investigations.

==== Others ====
- Kim Won-hae as Do-pil / Ji Joon-gi

A person called 'Chief of the Branch'.

- Tae In-ho as Nam Soo-hyuk

Gun-do's right arm, he believed in himself.

- Im Se-mi as Yoon Eun-mi

SBC TV reporter. As a reporter, she is full of passion and passion, and although sometimes she crosses a dangerous line, she had unshakable faith.

- Choi Jung-woo as Senior Ahn / Ahn Soo-seok

Senior Civil Affairs Officer at the Blue House.

=== Extended ===
- Kwon Oh-kyung as Prosecution investigation officer
- Go Geon-han as Event Moderator
- Kim Hak-sun as Hong Nan-hee's father

== Production ==
=== Development ===
The series was written by Oh Ja-kyu and planned and produced by JTBC Studios (now known as SLL), with Celltrion Entertainment as producer.

=== Release ===
On August 24, 2022, JTBC released the first footage of the series along with announcing the premiere date. The series was scheduled to be shown on September 24, 2022, as a follow-up to The Good Detective 2 on Saturday and Sunday.

== Viewership ==
The Empire : South Korea viewers per episode (thousands)

Season	Episode number																Average
Season	1	2	3	4	5	6	7	8	9	10	11	12	13	14	15	16	Average
1	564	650	413	775	497	849	395	655	371	691	397	N/A	608	467	600	832	N/A

Source: Audience measurement performed nationwide by Nielsen Korea.

Ep.	Original broadcast date	Average audience share (Nielsen Korea)	
Ep.	Original broadcast date	Nationwide	Seoul
1	September 24, 2022	2.399% (4th)	2.542% (2nd)
2	September 25, 2022	3.003% (3rd)	3.401% (2nd)
3	October 1, 2022	1.885% (6th)	2.042% (4th)
4	October 2, 2022	3.414% (2nd)	3.150% (2nd)
5	October 8, 2022	2.120% (6th)	2.195% (4th)
6	October 9, 2022	3.883% (2nd)	3.859% (2nd)
7	October 15, 2022	2.146% (6th)	1.803% (8th)
8	October 16, 2022	2.917% (2nd)	2.750% (2nd)
9	October 22, 2022	1.695% (11th)	1.562% (10th)
10	October 23, 2022	3.062% (2nd)	2.757% (4th)
11	October 29, 2022	1.844% (9th)	N/A
12	November 5, 2022 (Note: On October 30, 2022, it was confirmed that the drama would not air. Due to the aftermath of the Itaewon Halloween crowd crush, a special news item was replaced.)	1.573% (13th)	N/A
13	November 6, 2022	2.844% (2nd)	2.702% (3rd)
14	November 12, 2022	2.115% (9th)	N/A
15	November 13, 2022 (Note: On November 13, 2022, it will air two consecutive episodes, and episode 16 will end on November 13 as originally scheduled.)	2.811% (4th)	2.445% (4th)
16	November 13, 2022	4.036% (2nd)	3.725% (2nd)
Average		2.609%	— (Note: Due to some ratings not recorded, the exact average rating is unknown.)
In the table above, the blue numbers represent the lowest ratings and the red numbers represent the highest ratings.; N/A denotes ratings that were not released.; This drama airs on a cable channel/pay TV which normally has a relatively smaller audience compared to free-to-air TV/public broadcasters (KBS, SBS, MBC, and EBS).
