= Lee Eun-hyung =

South Korean actor

- Born: March 9, 1983; South Korea
- Occupation: Actor

Korean name
- Hangul: 이은형
- Hanja: 李垠亨
- RR: I Eunhyeong
- MR: I Ŭnhyŏng

Lee Eun-hyung (Korean: 이은형; born 9 March 1983) is a South Korean actor.

== Filmography ==
=== Television series ===
Year	Title	Role	Network	Ref.
2011	Padam Padam	Yang Kang-chil (young)	JTBC	
2014	Inspiring Generation		KBS2	
2014	Single-minded Dandelion	Seo Joon-ho	KBS2	
2017	Lovers in Bloom	Moo Soo-hyuk	KBS1	
2018	Mysterious Personal Shopper	Lee Jae-joon	KBS2	
2019	The Tale of Nokdu	Officer Baek Jong	KBS2	
2023	Woman in a Veil	Jung Yeong-joon	KBS2	
