= Lovers in Bloom =

2017 South Korean television series

- Promotional poster
- Hangul: 무궁화 꽃이 피었습니다
- Hanja: 無窮花 꽃이 피었습니다
- RR: Mugunghwa kkochi pieotseumnida
- MR: Mugunghwa kkoch'i p'iŏssŭmnida
- Genre: Romance; Melodrama; Police procedural
- Written by: Yum Il-ho; Lee Hae-jung
- Directed by: Go Young-tak
- Creative director: Yoo Kwan-mo
- Starring: Im Soo-hyang; Do Ji-han; Lee Chang-wook; Lee Eun-hyung; Nam Bo-ra
- Country of origin: South Korea
- Original language: Korean
- No. of episodes: 120

Production
- Executive producer: Park Ki-ho
- Producer: Lee So-yeon
- Running time: 35 minutes
- Production company: KBS Drama Production (KBS 드라마 제작국)

Original release
- Network: KBS1
- Release: May 29 – November 10, 2017

Lovers in Bloom (Korean: 무궁화 꽃이 피었습니다; RR: Mugunghwa kkochi pieotseumnida; lit. 'The Rose of Sharon Has Bloomed') is a 2017 South Korean television series starring Im Soo-hyang, Do Ji-han, Lee Chang-wook, Lee Eun-hyung, and Nam Bo-ra. The series aired daily on KBS1 from 8:25 p.m. to 9:00 p.m. (KST) from May 29 to November 10, 2017.

== Plot ==
Moo Goong-hwa, a former boxer becomes widowed and raises her daughter alone. She chooses to become a police officer. She works with Cha Tae-jin, an officer who has a high sense of justice.

== Cast ==
=== Main ===
- Im Soo-hyang as Moo Goong-hwa
- Do Ji-han as Cha Tae-jin
- Lee Chang-wook as Jin Do-hyun
- Lee Eun-hyung as Moo Soo-hyuk
- Nam Bo-ra as Jin Bo-ra

=== Supporting ===
==== People around Goong-hwa ====
- Yoon Bok-in as Lee Sun-ok
- Kim Dan-woo as Bong Woo-ri
- Yang Seung-pil as Son Joo-young

==== People around Tae-jin ====
- Seo Woo-rim as Noh Yeon-shil
- Jeon In-taek as Cha Sang-chul
- Lee Eung-kyung as Oh Kyung-ah / Oh Choon-rae
- Lee Ja-young as Cha Hee-jin
- Kim Hyun-kyun as Kang Baek-ho
- Jung Yoon-seok as Kang Hae-chan

==== People around Do-hyun ====
- Ko In-bum as Jin Dae-gab
- Park Hae-mi as Heo Sung-hee
- Kim Jae-seung as Seo Jae-hee

==== Police officers ====
- Son Kwang-eop as Lee Gyo-suk
- Park Gyu-ri as Jang Eun-joo
- Ban Sang-yoon as Park Yong-soo
- Geum Ho-suk as Choi Kyung-pyo

==== Others ====
- Lee Joon-seo as Park Hyun-soo
- Jung Yoon-min as Park Hyun-soo's father
- Jo Ah-ra as Eun Seo-hyun

=== Special appearances ===
- Geummi as Choi Seung-ah (Episode 1, 3, 4, 17, 23-31) (cameo)
- Kim Sung-soo as Stranger (cameo)
- Ahn Woo-yeon as Bong Yoon-jae (cameo)

== Ratings ==
In this table, The blue numbers represent the lowest ratings and the red numbers represent the highest ratings.

Episode #	Original broadcast date	Average audience share			
Episode #	Original broadcast date	TNmS Ratings		AGB Nielsen	
Episode #	Original broadcast date	Nationwide	Seoul National Capital Area	Nationwide	Seoul National Capital Area
1	May 29, 2017	21.6% (1st)	19.4% (1st)	22.0% (1st)	20.7% (1st)
2	May 30, 2017	15.2% (1st)	13.1% (2nd)	15.3% (1st)	15.5% (1st)
3	May 31, 2017	20.2% (1st)	16.5% (1st)	18.6% (1st)	17.2% (1st)
4	June 1, 2017	20.2% (1st)	17.1% (1st)	20.1% (1st)	18.8% (1st)
5	June 2, 2017	18.7% (1st)	17.3% (1st)	18.8% (1st)	17.6% (1st)
6	June 5, 2017	20.7% (1st)	17.8% (1st)	20.5% (1st)	19.1% (1st)
7	June 6, 2017	21.0% (1st)	18.8% (1st)	21.0% (1st)	20.4% (1st)
8	June 7, 2017	20.3% (1st)	16.8% (1st)	20.2% (1st)	20.3% (1st)
9	June 8, 2017	21.5% (1st)	18.5% (1st)	20.1% (1st)	19.6% (1st)
10	June 9, 2017	18.8% (1st)	17.0% (1st)	19.2% (1st)	18.6% (1st)
11	June 12, 2017	22.1% (1st)	18.5% (1st)	20.2% (1st)	18.8% (1st)
12	June 13, 2017	19.8% (1st)	15.6% (1st)	19.7% (1st)	19.3% (1st)
13	June 14, 2017	19.7% (1st)	15.6% (1st)	19.3% (1st)	18.6% (1st)
14	June 15, 2017	20.3% (1st)	16.7% (1st)	19.5% (1st)	18.4% (1st)
15	June 16, 2017	19.8% (1st)	17.3% (1st)	18.5% (1st)	17.8% (1st)
16	June 19, 2017	21.5% (1st)	17.8% (1st)	20.4% (1st)	19.9% (1st)
17	June 20, 2017	20.6% (1st)	16.9% (1st)	20.1% (1st)	18.9% (1st)
18	June 21, 2017	19.8% (1st)	17.1% (1st)	17.9% (1st)	16.4% (1st)
19	June 22, 2017	20.8% (1st)	17.5% (1st)	19.4% (1st)	18.3% (1st)
20	June 23, 2017	20.9% (1st)	17.6% (1st)	18.5% (1st)	16.9% (1st)
21	June 26, 2017	21.1% (1st)	18.1% (1st)	20.4% (1st)	19.0% (1st)
22	June 27, 2017	20.6% (1st)	16.8% (1st)	19.3% (1st)	18.5% (1st)
23	June 28, 2017	20.7% (1st)	16.8% (1st)	19.9% (1st)	19.1% (1st)
24	June 29, 2017	19.7% (1st)	17.2% (1st)	19.4% (1st)	18.3% (1st)
25	June 30, 2017	21.2% (2nd)	17.1% (2nd)	17.9% (1st)	17.1% (2nd)
26	July 3, 2017	21.7% (1st)	16.7% (2nd)	19.7% (1st)	18.6% (1st)
27	July 4, 2017	21.1% (1st)	17.4% (1st)	18.5% (1st)	17.6% (1st)
28	July 5, 2017	20.8% (1st)	16.5% (1st)	18.3% (1st)	17.2% (1st)
29	July 6, 2017	21.3% (1st)	17.5% (1st)	18.6% (1st)	17.4% (1st)
30	July 7, 2017	21.0% (2nd)	17.6% (2nd)	19.0% (1st)	18.0% (1st)
31	July 10, 2017	23.8% (1st)	19.3% (2nd)	20.1% (1st)	18.8% (1st)
32	July 11, 2017	19.9% (2nd)	17.1% (2nd)	19.2% (1st)	18.7% (1st)
33	July 12, 2017	21.2% (1st)	18.0% (3rd)	19.4% (1st)	18.9% (1st)
34	July 13, 2017	22.6% (1st)	18.9% (1st)	19.5% (1st)	18.7% (1st)
35	July 14, 2017	19.1% (2nd)	14.8% (2nd)	20.3% (1st)	18.8% (1st)
36	July 17, 2017	23.3% (2nd)	19.3% (2nd)	20.9% (1st)	18.9% (1st)
37	July 18, 2017	22.5% (1st)	18.1% (2nd)	19.3% (1st)	18.3% (1st)
38	July 19, 2017	21.5% (1st)	16.5% (2nd)	20.3% (1st)	19.3% (1st)
39	July 20, 2017	22.3% (1st)	19.0% (1st)	19.8% (1st)	18.9% (1st)
40	July 21, 2017	22.0% (1st)	18.6% (1st)	18.7% (1st)	17.1% (1st)
41	July 24, 2017	24.0% (2nd)	19.5% (1st)	20.9% (1st)	19.7% (1st)
42	July 25, 2017	23.3% (1st)	19.1% (1st)	19.9% (1st)	18.1% (1st)
43	July 26, 2017	22.0% (1st)	17.3% (1st)	19.4% (1st)	18.2% (1st)
44	July 27, 2017	22.6% (1st)	18.1% (2nd)	20.6% (1st)	19.6% (1st)
45	July 28, 2017	21.7% (1st)	17.7% (1st)	21.1% (1st)	20.1% (1st)
46	July 31, 2017	23.6% (1st)	18.5% (1st)	21.4% (1st)	20.2% (1st)
47	August 1, 2017	21.6% (2nd)	17.1% (2nd)	20.2% (1st)	20.0% (1st)
48	August 2, 2017	22.7% (1st)	18.0% (1st)	20.2% (1st)	18.8% (1st)
49	August 3, 2017	22.3% (1st)	18.4% (1st)	20.6% (1st)	19.6% (1st)
50	August 4, 2017	20.2% (2nd)	16.9% (1st)	19.5% (1st)	18.7% (1st)
51	August 7, 2017	23.5% (1st)	17.8% (1st)	19.5% (1st)	17.7% (1st)
52	August 8, 2017	22.8% (1st)	17.3% (2nd)	19.4% (2nd)	18.5% (1st)
53	August 9, 2017	21.4% (2nd)	16.5% (2nd)	19.9% (1st)	18.4% (1st)
54	August 10, 2017	24.2% (1st)	18.2% (2nd)	20.9% (1st)	19.1% (1st)
55	August 11, 2017	23.1% (1st)	18.3% (1st)	19.6% (1st)	18.8% (1st)
56	August 14, 2017	23.6% (1st)	19.3% (1st)	20.9% (1st)	19.2% (1st)
57	August 15, 2017	19.9% (2nd)	15.7% (2nd)	20.2% (1st)	19.4% (1st)
58	August 16, 2017	21.9% (2nd)	17.1% (2nd)	20.3% (1st)	18.6% (1st)
59	August 17, 2017	22.8% (2nd)	17.9% (2nd)	20.7% (1st)	19.4% (1st)
60	August 18, 2017	22.1% (2nd)	16.6% (2nd)	20.1% (2nd)	18.6% (2nd)
61	August 21, 2017	25.4% (1st)	20.5% (1st)	21.7% (1st)	19.9% (1st)
62	August 22, 2017	22.0% (2nd)	17.5% (2nd)	21.3% (1st)	20.1% (1st)
63	August 23, 2017	22.5% (2nd)	17.6% (2nd)	21.4% (1st)	20.4% (1st)
64	August 24, 2017	24.3% (1st)	18.9% (2nd)	22.3% (1st)	20.3% (1st)
65	August 25, 2017	22.2% (1st)	17.6% (1st)	19.4% (2nd)	18.3% (1st)
66	August 28, 2017	24.9% (1st)	19.3% (1st)	21.7% (2nd)	20.4% (1st)
67	August 29, 2017	22.7% (2nd)	17.7% (2nd)	21.0% (1st)	19.6% (1st)
68	August 30, 2017	22.8% (2nd)	18.3% (2nd)	20.8% (1st)	19.5% (1st)
69	August 31, 2017	24.1% (1st)	19.2% (2nd)	21.7% (1st)	20.1% (1st)
70	September 1, 2017	23.4% (2nd)	17.7% (2nd)	20.2% (1st)	18.7% (1st)
71	September 4, 2017	23.5% (2nd)	19.2% (2nd)	22.1% (1st)	20.4% (1st)
72	September 5, 2017	21.8% (2nd)	17.8% (2nd)	21.4% (2nd)	19.5% (2nd)
73	September 6, 2017	23.7% (2nd)	19.8% (2nd)	21.5% (2nd)	19.7% (2nd)
74	September 7, 2017	23.0% (2nd)	19.4% (2nd)	20.8% (1st)	19.2% (2nd)
75	September 8, 2017	23.2% (2nd)	18.5% (2nd)	20.2% (2nd)	18.4% (2nd)
76	September 11, 2017	24.5% (2nd)	20.0% (2nd)	21.8% (2nd)	18.9% (2nd)
77	September 12, 2017	16.1% (2nd)	13.3% (2nd)	20.9% (2nd)	18.6% (2nd)
78	September 13, 2017	22.7% (2nd)	18.2% (2nd)	21.0% (2nd)	19.6% (2nd)
79	September 14, 2017	22.9% (2nd)	18.5% (2nd)	21.8% (2nd)	19.5% (2nd)
80	September 15, 2017	22.2% (2nd)	17.2% (2nd)	20.5% (2nd)	19.2% (2nd)
81	September 18, 2017	23.5% (1st)	20.6% (1st)	21.0% (1st)	18.8% (1st)
82	September 19, 2017	22.6% (1st)	17.2% (1st)	21.3% (1st)	19.4% (1st)
83	September 20, 2017	22.7% (1st)	17.9% (1st)	20.4% (1st)	19.0% (1st)
84	September 21, 2017	23.2% (1st)	18.0% (1st)	21.5% (1st)	19.5% (1st)
85	September 22, 2017	22.0% (1st)	17.5% (1st)	20.9% (1st)	19.2% (1st)
86	September 25, 2017	23.4% (1st)	17.7% (1st)	22.2% (1st)	21.5% (1st)
87	September 26, 2017	22.7% (1st)	17.5% (1st)	21.5% (1st)	19.5% (1st)
88	September 27, 2017	23.2% (1st)	18.6% (1st)	21.2% (1st)	20.1% (1st)
89	September 28, 2017	23.6% (1st)	19.5% (1st)	21.4% (1st)	19.3% (1st)
90	September 29, 2017	21.1% (1st)	16.5% (1st)	20.7% (1st)	18.9% (1st)
91	October 2, 2017	19.4% (1st)	14.4% (1st)	20.1% (1st)	17.6% (1st)
92	October 3, 2017	19.1% (1st)	14.8% (1st)	17.4% (1st)	15.9% (1st)
93	October 4, 2017	16.9% (1st)	11.5% (1st)	17.7% (1st)	16.3% (1st)
94	October 5, 2017	17.8% (1st)	14.2% (1st)	17.1% (1st)	15.5% (1st)
95	October 6, 2017	18.9% (1st)	13.6% (1st)	18.2% (1st)	16.0% (1st)
96	October 9, 2017	19.2% (1st)	15.6% (1st)	18.3% (1st)	16.9% (1st)
97	October 10, 2017	23.3% (1st)	19.0% (1st)	21.0% (1st)	19.0% (1st)
98	October 11, 2017	23.1% (1st)	19.3% (1st)	21.5% (1st)	20.4% (1st)
99	October 12, 2017	23.6% (1st)	18.8% (1st)	23.0% (1st)	21.7% (1st)
100	October 13, 2017	20.0% (1st)	15.8% (1st)	19.0% (1st)	16.0% (1st)
101	October 16, 2017	23.5% (1st)	18.7% (1st)	21.9% (1st)	20.4% (1st)
102	October 17, 2017	22.3% (1st)	16.7% (1st)	22.0% (1st)	20.9% (1st)
103	October 18, 2017	23.4% (1st)	19.8% (1st)	20.9% (1st)	19.2% (1st)
104	October 19, 2017	25.0% (1st)	19.7% (1st)	22.0% (1st)	20.5% (1st)
105	October 20, 2017	21.1% (1st)	17.6% (1st)	19.0% (1st)	16.8% (1st)
106	October 23, 2017	24.7% (1st)	19.1% (1st)	22.1% (1st)	20.5% (1st)
107	October 24, 2017	23.6% (1st)	18.5% (1st)	21.6% (1st)	20.2% (1st)
108	October 25, 2017	22.1% (1st)	17.8% (1st)	20.1% (1st)	18.1% (1st)
109	October 26, 2017	24.3% (1st)	19.1% (1st)	20.0% (1st)	19.1% (1st)
110	October 27, 2017	24.0% (1st)	19.1% (1st)	20.1% (1st)	18.0% (1st)
111	October 30, 2017	20.8% (1st)	17.1% (1st)	19.3% (1st)	17.7% (1st)
112	October 31, 2017	23.1% (1st)	19.2% (1st)	22.2% (1st)	21.1% (1st)
113	November 1, 2017	22.5% (1st)	19.3% (1st)	20.4% (1st)	19.3% (1st)
114	November 2, 2017	24.3% (1st)	19.9% (1st)	21.9% (1st)	21.2% (1st)
115	November 3, 2017	23.4% (1st)	19.1% (1st)	20.7% (1st)	18.6% (1st)
116	November 6, 2017	23.6% (1st)	19.2% (1st)	21.5% (1st)	20.0% (1st)
117	November 7, 2017	23.8% (1st)	19.8% (1st)	22.0% (1st)	20.9% (1st)
118	November 8, 2017	23.3% (1st)	19.6% (1st)	21.7% (1st)	20.6% (1st)
119	November 9, 2017	25.5% (1st)	21.3% (1st)	23.4% (1st)	22.0% (1st)
120	November 10, 2017	23.3% (1st)	18.0% (1st)	21.6% (1st)	19.4% (1st)
Average		21.9%	17.7%	20.3%	18.9%

== Awards and nominations ==
Year	Award	Category	Nominee(s)	Result
2017	31st KBS Drama Awards	Excellence Award, Actor in a Daily Drama	Lee Chang-wook	Nominated
2017	31st KBS Drama Awards	Excellence Award, Actress in a Daily Drama	Im Soo-hyang	Won
