= Yang Seung-pil =

South Korean actor

- Born: January 3, 1992 (age 34); Seoul, South Korea
- Education: Konkuk University
- Occupation: Actor
- Years active: 2013–2017

Korean name
- Hangul: 양승필
- RR: Yang Seungpil
- MR: Yang Sŭngp'il

Yang Seung-pil (born January 3, 1992) is a South Korean former actor. He made his acting debut in the television series The Heirs (2013).

== Filmography ==
=== Television series ===
Year	Title	Network	Role	Ref.
2013	The Heirs	SBS	Hyo-joon	
2015	More Than a Maid	JTBC	Ba-woo	
2017	Lovers in Bloom	KBS1	Son Joo-young	
