= Woman in a Veil =

2023 South Korean television series

- Promotional poster
- Hangul: 비밀의 여자
- Hanja: 秘密의 女子
- RR: Bimirui yeoja
- MR: Pimirŭi yŏja
- Genre: Melodrama; Revenge; Body swap
- Developed by: KBS Drama Division (Planning)
- Written by: Lee Jung-dae
- Directed by: Shin Chang-seok
- Music by: Choi Chul-ho
- Country of origin: South Korea
- Original language: Korean
- No. of episodes: 103 (Note: Originally scheduled to air for 100 episodes, the series was extended by 3 episodes)

Production
- Executive producer: Seong Jun-hae (KBS)
- Producers: Park Jae-sam; Lee Seung-hee; Lee Jin-ah; Baek Seung-min
- Running time: 35 minutes
- Production company: Celltrion Entertainment

Original release
- Network: KBS2
- Release: March 14 – August 4, 2023

Related
- Man in a Veil

Woman in a Veil (Korean: 비밀의 여자) is a South Korean television series starring Choi Yoon-young, Lee Chae-young, Lee Sun-ho, Han Ki-woong, Lee Eun-hyung, and Shin Go-eun. It premiered on KBS2 from March 14 to August 4, 2023, and airs every Monday to Friday at 19:50 (KST).

== Synopsis ==
A drama about a woman who loses her sight due to her husband and his lover and falls into 'Locked-In Syndrome' (conscious general paralysis). She exchanges her soul, with an heiress who has it all and is out for truth and revenge.

== Cast ==
=== Main ===
- Choi Yoon-young as Oh Se-rin

The lead villain and Oh Se-yeon's younger sister. After losing her parents, Se-rin grew up as an arrogant and violent person despite receiving a great fortune and being born into an wealthy family. She could have anything she desired with her vast money, except Tae-yang, the son of her maid. Tae-yang was always there for her, sometimes as an elder brother, sometimes as a teacher, helping her through life. Her obsession for Tae-yang becomes dangerous as she is willing to do crazy things for him. After Ae-ra killed her sister and frames Jung Gyeol's father, Se-rin goes berserk and tries to kill Jung Gyeol's family. Se-rin plotted evil schemes against the latter but failed. After the accident of Tae-yang, she blames Jung Gyeol for her misfortunes and tries to kill her at the hospital. Se-rin's wicked plan backfires at her and switched souls with her. Five years had passed, and she found herself in the body of Jung Gyeol and currently in comatose state.

- Shin Go-eun as Jung Gyeol (Ep 1–84, 102)

The main protagonist and villain (when Se-rin inhabited her body) of the story. She managed to remain caring and hopeful despite her poor financial position. She was, however, rapidly worn out, largely as a result of her husband and his family. Her husband's behavior abruptly altered after their honeymoon, and his family started to neglect her. She was able to put up with it because her father-in-law, Man-joong, and the chairman of the YJ Group liked her. She was unaware that her friend Ae-ra and her husband were having an illicit relationship, though. In order to get her to spend private time with her spouse, Yu-jin, Ae-ra exchanged her birth control pills for her respiratory medication and gave her a drugged tea. But something strange took place. After consuming the poisoned tea, Jung Gyeol had visual loss due to drowsy driving. In addition, Ae-ra accused Jung Gyeol's father of murder after learning of her pregnancy. When Jung Gyeol, who had lost everything as a result of Ae-ra and her husband, screamed out for vengeance. After discovering the truth and evidence, Ae-ra plotted to kill Jung Gyeol through her goons. Jung Gyeol then had an accident with Tae-yang and was paralyzed. Ae-ra stole the evidence and planned her next step of becoming the wife of Yoo-jin. Se-rin who is devasted of Tae-yang's condition after the accident, she plotted to kill Jung Gyeol and blames her for her misfortunes. Se-rin's evil plan backfires at her and Jung Gyeol discovered that Se-rin's soul had been exchanged with her own. Jung Gyeol uses Se-rin's body and wealth to seek revenge against Yoo-jin and Ae-ra.

- Lee Chae-young as Joo Ae-ra

The main villain of the story. Ae-ra is evil personified and her only goal in life is to become the daughter-in-law of YJ Group for revenge. She is Yoo-jin's mistress and the one who kidnapped Jung Gyeol's daughter. Her real name is Kim Jang-mi, and she even lied about her real identity. Thirty-two years ago, her family collapsed after her mother died due to YJ family and she was sent to various foster homes by her uncle, whom she lost contact with. After being adopted overseas and later abandoned, she finally met her uncle, who attempted to exploit her for money but inadvertently revealed the truth about her mother's death. Her mother had been killed in due to the intervention of the eldest son of the Nam's family. After discovering the truth, she decides to enter the YJ family and seek revenge against Man-joong, who had ruined her family and her life. Ae-ra becomes more evil and will kill anyone in a painful way who she considers her enemy. She removes anyone who stands in her way for revenge, including Jung Gyeol. Five years later, when Ae-ra tries to stop Gyeol, who has taken over Se-rin's body, she learns a shocking truth.

- Han Ki-woong as Nam Yoo-jin

A serial cheater and Jung Gyeol's husband. He and his mistress, Ae-ra plotted Jung Gyeol's accident.

- Lee Seon-ho as Seo Tae-yang

He was born as an only son to an unmarried mother, but grew up to be a wise and honest young man. But everything changed when he met Ae-ra. He met Ae-ra, who worked as a hostess at a bar, while working part-time to pay for his tuition, and eventually fell in love with her while caring for her. He accidentally committed a crime while attempting to save Ae-ra, and Ae-ra vanished like a fugitive, leaving him with a criminal record and wrecking his dreams and life. To make a living, he then worked as a delivery man.

- Lee Eun-hyung as Jung Yong-joon

Jung Gyeol's brother who works as a lawyer at YJ Group.

=== Supporting ===
- Kim Ye-ryung as Cha Young-ran (Yoo-jin's mother)
- Kim Hee-jung as Seo Jeong-hye (Tae-yang's mother)
- Lee Min-ji as Nam Yoo-ri (Yoo-jin's sister)
- Bang Eun Hee as Yoon Gil-ja (Jung Gyeol's mother)
- Lim-hyuk as Nam Man-joong (Great Grandfather / Grandfather of Yoo-jin)
- Lee Jong-won as Nam Yoon-seok (Yoo-jin's father)
- Lee Jung-young Lee Young-soo (Tae-yang's uncle)
- Kim Tae-yeon as Nam So-yi / Seo Ha-neul (Yoo-jin and Gyeol's biological daughter) (Ep. 21–103)
- Choi Jae-sung as Jong Hyun-tae (Jung Gyeol's father) (Ep. 1–18, 84, 102)
- Yoon Ji-suk as Yoon Mal-ja (Jung Gyeol's aunt)
- Kim Ga-yoon as Seo Kyung-sook (Kidnapper of Nam So-yi / Seo Ha-neul) (Ep. 14–15, 47–52, 56–57)
- Nam Sang-gi as Go A-ra (real) (Ep. 77–89)
- Lee Myung-ho as Pyeon Sang-guk (Ep. 11, 84–92) (Nam Yeon-seok's secretary)

=== Special appearance ===
- Lee Seul-ah as Oh Se-yeon (Ep. 1–13)
- Ji Hyun-woo as Journalist (Ep.77)
- Geum Ho-seok as Kim Seong-jun (Se-rin's matchmaker) (Ep.4-7, 59)

== Production ==
The series is the female version of Man in a Veil by writer Kim Jeong-dae. The work brings together the director and writer again after the series Man in a Veil. It is planned by KBS Drama Department and produced by Celltrion Entertainment.

== Original soundtrack ==
The following is the official lineup of tracks featured on Woman in a Veil (Original Television Soundtrack) album. The album's singles were rolled out between March 28, 2023, and June 14, 2023.

Woman in a Veil (Original Television Soundtrack)

Soundtrack album by various artists
- Released: August 2, 2023
- Recorded: 2023
- Genres: Soundtrack; Ballad; K-pop
- Length: 27:18
- Languages: Korean; English
- Label: Most Contents

No.	Title	Artist/Group	Length
1.	"Destiny Of Love" (운명 같은 사랑)	Ha Dong Yeon	4:29
2.	"The Lost Umbrella" (잃어버린 우산)	Ryu Woon Jeong	3:24
3.	"Melodrama" (사랑의 시작은 그 한 장면에서)	crockyO	3:16
4.	"I'm Still You" (여전히 난 그대죠)	or&	3:32
5.	"Miss You" (오늘도 그려본다)	Joo Seol Ok	4:30
6.	"I Need Your Love" (사랑이 필요해)	Bae Dohwan	3:39
7.	"Scene" ("Woman In a Veil" Title Full Version)	Choi Cheol-ho, Oh Hye-joo, Kim Ha-young	4:28
Total length:			27:18

== Viewership ==
Woman in a Veil : South Korea viewers per episode (millions)

Episodes	Episode number																			
Episodes	1	2	3	4	5	6	7	8	9	10	11	12	13	14	15	16	17	18	19	20
1–20	1.851	1.521	1.723	1.529	1.603	1.740	1.670	1.832	1.683	1.891	1.744	1.662	1.568	1.527	1.703	1.622	1.619	1.650	1.786	1.824
21–40	1.722	1.766	1.781	1.690	1.959	1.643	1.800	1.651	1.977	2.152	1.850	1.935	1.978	1.908	1.935	1.918	1.954	1.959	1.930	1.833
41–60	1.852	1.840	1.868	1.928	1.782	1.765	1.930	1.935	1.916	1.839	1.904	1.753	1.835	1.937	2.019	1.802	1.980	1.799	1.762	1.862
61–80	1.819	2.008	1.720	1.965	1.818	1.827	1.777	1.610	1.907	1.780	1.738	1.849	1.692	1.893	1.707	1.794	1.957	1.764	1.835	1.957
81–100	1.644	1.845	1.899	1.788	1.961	1.822	2.026	1.953	1.936	1.919	1.874	1.787	1.841	1.932	1.862	1.854	1.941	1.885	1.984	2.124
101–103	2.058	1.277	2.040	–																

Source: Audience measurement performed nationwide by Nielsen Korea.

Ep.	Original broadcast date	Average audience share		
Ep.	Original broadcast date	Nielsen Korea		TNmS
Ep.	Original broadcast date	Nationwide	Seoul	Nationwide
1	March 14, 2023	10.4% (2nd)	8.2% (2nd)	12.4% (2nd)
2	March 15, 2023	8.8% (3rd)	7.4% (3rd)	10.1% (3rd)
3	March 16, 2023	10.0% (2nd)	8.9% (2nd)	11.3% (2nd)
4	March 17, 2023	8.7% (3rd)	6.9% (5th)	10.8% (3rd)
5	March 20, 2023	9.5% (3rd)	8.0% (3rd)	10.8% (2nd)
6	March 21, 2023	9.8% (2nd)	8.1% (2nd)	11.6% (2nd)
7	March 22, 2023	9.5% (2nd)	8.1% (2nd)	11.1% (2nd)
8	March 23, 2023	10.0% (2nd)	8.1% (2nd)	10.8% (2nd)
9	March 24, 2023	9.6% (3rd)	7.8% (4th)	9.9% (3rd)
10	March 27, 2023	10.4% (2nd)	9.4% (2nd)	11.4% (2nd)
11	March 28, 2023	10.4% (2nd)	9.4% (2nd)	10.6% (2nd)
12	March 29, 2023	9.8% (2nd)	8.8% (2nd)	9.9% (2nd)
13	March 30, 2023	9.1% (2nd)	7.5% (2nd)	10.4% (2nd)
14	April 3, 2023 (Note: On March 31, Woman In a Veil did not aired due to reorganization of the opening performance of the 2023 Suncheon Bay International Garden Expo <Spring, To the Garden>.)	9.3% (2nd)	7.8% (2nd)	10.9% (2nd)
15	April 4, 2023	9.7% (2nd)	7.9% (2nd)	10.5% (2nd)
16	April 5, 2023	9.5% (2nd)	8.3% (2nd)	11.0% (2nd)
17	April 6, 2023	9.5% (2nd)	8.0% (2nd)	10.2% (2nd)
18	April 7, 2023	9.3% (3rd)	7.4% (4th)	9.5% (3rd)
19	April 10, 2023	10.3% (2nd)	8.7% (2nd)	11.1% (2nd)
20	April 11, 2023	10.6% (2nd)	9.5% (2nd)	11.9% (2nd)
21	April 12, 2023	9.9% (2nd)	8.7% (2nd)	9.8% (3rd)
22	April 13, 2023	10.3% (2nd)	8.7% (2nd)	11.1% (2nd)
23	April 14, 2023	10.2% (3rd)	8.8% (4th)	10.8% (3rd)
24	April 17, 2023	10.3% (2nd)	8.9% (2nd)	11.6% (2nd)
25	April 18, 2023	11.3% (2nd)	9.4% (2nd)	12.2% (2nd)
26	April 19, 2023	9.9% (2nd)	8.3% (2nd)	10.8% (2nd)
27	April 20, 2023	11.1% (2nd)	9.8% (2nd)	11.5% (2nd)
28	April 21, 2023	9.8% (2nd)	8.3% (3rd)	10.4% (2nd)
29	April 24, 2023	11.3% (2nd)	9.3% (2nd)	11.4% (2nd)
30	April 25, 2023	12.1% (2nd)	10.4% (2nd)	12.3% (2nd)
31	April 26, 2023	11.0% (2nd)	9.2% (2nd)	12.0% (2nd)
32	April 27, 2023	11.5% (2nd)	10.3% (2nd)	10.9% (2nd)
33	April 28, 2023	11.3% (3rd)	9.7% (3rd)	10.6% (2nd)
34	May 1, 2023	11.2% (2nd)	9.6% (2nd)	11.2% (2nd)
35	May 2, 2023	11.6% (2nd)	10.3% (2nd)	11.9% (2nd)
36	May 3, 2023	11.3% (2nd)	9.2% (2nd)	12.2% (2nd)
37	May 4, 2023	11.8% (2nd)	10.2% (2nd)	11.5% (2nd)
38	May 5, 2023	11.3% (3rd)	9.4% (3rd)	12.5% (2nd)
39	May 8, 2023	10.9% (2nd)	9.6% (2nd)	11.5% (2nd)
40	May 9, 2023	11.3% (2nd)	9.3% (2nd)	10.9% (2nd)
41	May 10, 2023	10.7% (2nd)	9.0% (2nd)	10.2% (2nd)
42	May 11, 2023	10.7% (2nd)	9.2% (2nd)	12.1% (2nd)
43	May 12, 2023	10.8% (3rd)	8.9% (3rd)	11.6% (2nd)
44	May 15, 2023	11.3% (2nd)	9.7% (2nd)	12.6% (2nd)
45	May 16, 2023	11.0% (2nd)	9.6% (2nd)	12.4% (2nd)
46	May 17, 2023	10.7% (2nd)	8.6% (2nd)	11.4% (2nd)
47	May 18, 2023	11.4% (2nd)	10.0% (2nd)	11.8% (2nd)
48	May 19, 2023	11.2% (3rd)	9.8% (2nd)	10.5% (2nd)
49	May 22, 2023	11.2% (2nd)	9.6% (2nd)	11.9% (2nd)
50	May 23, 2023	11.1% (2nd)	9.1% (2nd)	11.9% (2nd)
51	May 24, 2023	11.5% (2nd)	9.5% (2nd)	10.6% (2nd)
52	May 25, 2023	10.6% (2nd)	9.1% (2nd)	10.0% (2nd)
53	May 26, 2023	10.5% (3rd)	9.2% (3rd)	10.6% (2nd)
54	May 29, 2023	11.4% (2nd)	9.5% (2nd)	13.4% (2nd)
55	May 30, 2023	11.4% (2nd)	9.4% (2nd)	12.0% (2nd)
56	May 31, 2023	10.8% (2nd)	9.1% (2nd)	11.6% (2nd)
57	June 1, 2023	12.1% (2nd)	10.3% (2nd)	12.6% (2nd)
58	June 2, 2023	10.8% (3rd)	9.1% (3rd)	12.0% (3rd)
59	June 5, 2023	10.5% (2nd)	9.2% (2nd)	11.5% (2nd)
60	June 6, 2023	11.1% (2nd)	10.1% (2nd)	12.2% (2nd)
61	June 7, 2023	11.0% (2nd)	9.3% (2nd)	11.0% (2nd)
62	June 8, 2023	12.1% (2nd)	10.5% (2nd)	11.1% (2nd)
63	June 9, 2023	10.5% (3rd)	9.0% (4th)	11.2% (3rd)
64	June 12, 2023	11.5% (2nd)	10.0% (2nd)	11.5% (2nd)
65	June 13, 2023	10.5% (2nd)	9.0% (2nd)	11.9% (2nd)
66	June 14, 2023	10.6% (2nd)	8.8% (2nd)	11.6% (2nd)
67	June 15, 2023	10.9% (2nd)	9.3% (2nd)	12.2% (2nd)
68	June 16, 2023	9.2% (3rd)	8.4% (3rd)	N/A
69	June 19, 2023	10.9% (2nd)	9.9% (2nd)	10.9% (2nd)
70	June 20, 2023	11.4% (2nd)	9.8% (2nd)	11.7% (2nd)
71	June 21, 2023	10.5% (2nd)	8.6% (2nd)	10.4% (2nd)
72	June 22, 2023	10.7% (2nd)	9.6% (2nd)	11.2% (2nd)
73	June 23, 2023	10.4% (2nd)	8.8% (3rd)	10.6% (2nd)
74	June 26, 2023	11.5% (2nd)	10.3% (2nd)	12.1% (2nd)
75	June 27, 2023	10.0% (2nd)	8.1% (2nd)	11.3% (2nd)
76	June 28, 2023	10.9% (1st)	9.3% (1st)	10.8% (1st)
77	June 29, 2023	11.6% (2nd)	10.1% (2nd)	12.4% (2nd)
78	June 30, 2023	10.3% (3rd)	8.6% (3rd)	10.7% (3rd)
79	July 3, 2023	10.6% (2nd)	9.2% (2nd)	11.7% (2nd)
80	July 4, 2023	11.8% (2nd)	10.3% (2nd)	13.0% (2nd)
81	July 5, 2023	9.7% (2nd)	7.9% (2nd)	10.8% (2nd)
82	July 6, 2023	11.0% (2nd)	9.7% (2nd)	11.9% (2nd)
83	July 7, 2023	11.0% (2nd)	10.6% (2nd)	11.4% (2nd)
84	July 10, 2023	11.2% (2nd)	9.9% (2nd)	12.0% (2nd)
85	July 11, 2023	12.0% (1st)	10.1% (1st)	12.5% (1st)
86	July 12, 2023	10.7% (2nd)	8.7% (2nd)	11.7% (2nd)
87	July 13, 2023	11.6% (2nd)	10.0% (2nd)	11.8% (2nd)
88	July 14, 2023	11.6% (2nd)	10.6% (3rd)	13.1% (2nd)
89	July 17, 2023	12.0% (2nd)	10.0% (2nd)	13.7% (2nd)
90	July 18, 2023	11.7% (2nd)	9.9% (2nd)	13.6% (2nd)
91	July 19, 2023	11.2% (2nd)	9.5% (2nd)	11.3% (2nd)
92	July 20, 2023	10.9% (2nd)	9.5% (2nd)	11.8% (2nd)
93	July 21, 2023	10.3% (2nd)	8.8% (4th)	11.3% (2nd)
94	July 24, 2023	12.0% (2nd)	10.8% (2nd)	13.1% (2nd)
95	July 25, 2023	11.5% (2nd)	9.8% (2nd)	12.9% (2nd)
96	July 26, 2023	11.3% (2nd)	9.8% (2nd)	12.7% (2nd)
97	July 27, 2023	11.9% (1st)	10.5% (1st)	12.7% (1st)
98	July 28, 2023	11.6% (1st)	10.2% (2nd)	11.8% (1st)
99	July 31, 2023	12.3% (2nd)	10.7% (2nd)	12.4% (2nd)
100	August 1, 2023	13.0% (2nd)	11.5% (2nd)	12.8% (2nd)
101	August 2, 2023	12.1% (2nd)	10.2% (2nd)	12.5% (2nd)
102	August 3, 2023	7.5% (4th)	6.0% (3rd)	6.9% (6th)
103	August 4, 2023	12.1% (2nd)	10.0% (2nd)	N/A
Average		10.8%	9.2%	— (Note: Due to some ratings not recorded, the exact average rating is unknown.)
In the table above, the blue numbers represent the lowest ratings and the red numbers represent the highest ratings.; N/A denotes ratings that were not published.

== Awards & Nominations ==
Name of the award ceremony, year presented, category, nominee of the award, and the result of the nomination
Award Ceremony	Year	Category	Recipient	Result	Ref.
2023 KBS Drama Awards	2023	Excellence Award, Actress in a Daily Drama	Choi Yoon-young	Won	
2023 KBS Drama Awards	2023	Excellence Award, Actress in a Daily Drama	Lee Chae-young	Nominated	
2023 KBS Drama Awards	2023	Excellence Award, Actor in a Daily Drama	Han Ki-woong	Nominated	
2023 KBS Drama Awards	2023	Excellence Award, Actor in a Daily Drama	Lee Eun-hyung	Nominated	

== International Broadcast ==
Year	Premiere	Channel	Country
2023	March 21, 2023	KBS World	Worldwide
2023	October 4, 2023	KBS World (Japan)	Japan
