= Bubbly Lovely =

2016 South Korean evening daily drama

- Promotional poster
- Also known as: Love Bubbles; Droplets of Love
- Hangul: 사랑은 방울방울
- RR: Sarangeun bangulbangul
- MR: Sarangŭn pangulbangul
- Genre: Melodrama; Romance; Family; Comedy
- Created by: Hong Chang-wook
- Written by: Kim Young-in
- Directed by: Kim Jeong-min
- Starring: Wang Ji-hye; Kang Eun-tak; Gong Hyun-joo; Kim Min-soo; Kang Dong-ho
- Country of origin: South Korea
- Original language: Korean
- No. of episodes: 120

Production
- Executive producers: Baek Chang-joo; Park Jin-hyung
- Producer: Lee Hee-soo
- Running time: 38 minutes every Monday to Friday at 19:20 (KST)
- Production company: C-JeS Entertainment

Original release
- Network: SBS TV
- Release: 28 November 2016 – 2 June 2017

Bubbly Lovely (Korean: 사랑은 방울방울; RR: Sarangeun bangulbangul; lit. Love is Drop by Drop) is a 2016 South Korean drama starring Wang Ji-hye, Kang Eun-tak, Gong Hyun-joo, Kim Min-soo, and Kang Dong-ho. It aired on SBS TV from November 28, 2016, to June 2, 2017, every Monday to Friday evening at 19:20 for 120 episodes.

== Plot ==
The series focuses on a bubbly woman named Eun Bang-wool who received a heart transplant from her late husband with her boss, Park Woo-hyuk.

== Cast and characters ==
=== Main cast ===
- Wang Ji-hye as Eun Bang-wool
- Kang Eun-tak as Park Woo-hyuk
- Gong Hyun-joo as Han Chae-rin
- Kim Min-soo as Kang Sang-cheol
- Kang Dong-ho as Yoon Dong-joon

=== People around Eun Bang-wool ===
- Kim Myung-soo as Eun Jang-ho
- Lee Jong-soo as Yoon Dong-min
- Lee Sang-in as Shin Ji-yeon
- Sunwoo Eun-sook as Im Soon-bok
- Kim Ha-kyoon as Yoon Ye-neung
- Seo Eun-yul as Yoon Byeong-seon

=== People around Han Chae-rin ===
- Kil Yong-woo as Han Young-mok
- Jung Chan as Sun-woo
- Kim Hye-ri as Na Young-sook

=== People around Park Woo-hyuk ===
- Kim Ye-ryung as Oh Hae-won
- Kim Yoon-kyung as Park Woo-kyung
- Choi Wan-jeong as Chun Kang-ja
