= Two Mothers (TV series) =

- Promotional poster
- Genre: Melodrama; Romance; Family; Revenge
- Developed by: KBS Drama
- Written by: Hwang Soon-Young
- Directed by: Kwak Ki-Won
- Starring: Jang Seo-Hee; Lee Chae-Young
- Music by: Lee Chang-hee
- Country of origin: South Korea
- Original language: Korean
- No. of episodes: 102

Production
- Executive producer: Lee Jae-Young
- Producers: Baek Sang-Hoon, Lee Un-Jung
- Running time: Mondays to Fridays at 19:50 (KST)
- Production companies: Jidam Inc formerly Yein E&M

Original release
- Network: KBS2
- Release: June 3 – November 7, 2014

Two Mothers (Korean: 뻐꾸기 둥지; RR: Ppeokkugi dungji; lit. Cuckoo's Nest) is a 2014 South Korean daily drama starring Jang Seo-hee, Lee Chae-young, Hwang Dong-joo and Kim Kyung-nam. It premiered on KBS2 on June 3, 2014, airing every Monday to Friday at 19:50 for 102 episodes.

== Plot ==
Hwa-young believes that Yeon-hee, her brother's ex-girlfriend, drove him to his death. When the sadness married Yeon-hee is diagnosed with uterine cancer, Hwa-young volunteers to become a surrogate mother for her, all the while planning her revenge. Hwa-young conceives and gives birth, lets Yeon-hee raise the child, then destroys Yeon-hee by trying to take the child back. Later, Yeon-hee tries her best to get her child back. Yeon-hee's husband regrets for letting Yeon-hee go.

== Cast ==
=== Main characters ===
- Jang Seo-hee as Baek Yeon-hee
- Hwang Dong-joo as Jung Byung-gook
- Lee Chae-young as Lee Hwa-young / Grace Lee
- Kim Kyung-nam as Yoo Sung-bin
- Hyun Woo-sung as Lee Myung-woon

=== Supporting characters ===
Baek Yeon-hee's family

- Im Chae-moo as Baek-chul
- Uhm Yoo-shin as Hong Geum-ok
- Son Ga-young as Baek Joon-hee
- Jung Ji-hoon as Jung Jin-woo

Jung Byung-gook's family

- Seo Kwon-soon as Kwak Hee-ja
- Ji Soo-won as Jung Jin-sook
- Kim Min-jwa as Jung Yoo-mi

Lee Hwa-young's family

- Park Joon-geum as Bae Choo-ja
- Lee Sook as Lee Ssang-soon
- Jeon No-min as Bae Chan-sik
- Jeon Min-seo as Lee So-ra
  - Park Ji-so as Lee So-ra (child)

Others

- Lee Chang-wook as Choi Sang-Doo
- Han Kyung-sun as Lee Gong-hee
- Heo In-young as Soon-nam
- Lee Jung-hoon as Oh Ki-seop
- Oh Ji-young as Moon-sook
- Lee Doo-seop as Director Lee
- Jang Sol-mi as Young-eun
- Kim Ri-won as Kim So-jin
- Ahn Hong-jin as Jin Myung-suk
- Kwon Hyuk-ho as Jung Byung-gook
- Jung Min-jin as Lee Dong-hyun (cameo)
- Ahn Bo-hyun
- Kim Da-hyun
- Son Woo-hyuk

== Ratings ==
In the tables below, the blue numbers represent the lowest ratings and the red numbers represent the highest ratings.

Episode #	Original broadcast date	Average audience share	
Episode #	Original broadcast date	TNmS Ratings	
Episode #	Original broadcast date	Nationwide	Seoul National Capital Area
1	3 June 2014	16.5 (3rd)	17.2 (3rd)
2	4 June 2014	12.3 (2nd)	13.5 (3rd)
3	5 June 2014	13.3 (5th)	13.9 (6th)
4	6 June 2014	14.8 (3rd)	15.8 (3rd)
5	9 June 2014	14.3 (4th)	14.2 (5th)
6	10 June 2014	13.7 (4th)	14.3 (5th)
7	11 June 2014	15.0 (3rd)	16.3 (4th)
8	12 June 2014	15.6 (3rd)	16.5 (3rd)
9	13 June 2014	14.2 (4th)	14.2 (6th)
10	16 June 2014	14.5 (4th)	15.5 (4th)
11	17 June 2014	14.0 (5th)	13.8 (5th)
12	18 June 2014	13.7 (5th)	13.6 (6th)
13	19 June 2014	12.8 (6th)	12.8 (6th)
14	20 June 2014	13.8 (5th)	13.3 (5th)
15	23 June 2014	13.5 (5th)	12.3 (6th)
16	24 June 2014	13.0 (6th)	13.4 (5th)
17	25 June 2014	13.0 (4th)	12.5 (5th)
18	26 June 2014	13.4 (5th)	13.1 (4th)
19	27 June 2014	13.3 (4th)	12.5 (6th)
20	30 June 2014	13.7 (5th)	13.2 (5th)
21	1 July 2014	14.3 (4th)	13.4 (5th)
22	2 July 2014	15.9 (4th)	15.0 (4th)
23	3 July 2014	14.2 (4th)	13.6 (5th)
24	4 July 2014	12.9 (4th)	12.7 (5th)
25	7 July 2014	14.5 (4th)	13.8 (4th)
26	8 July 2014	13.7 (4th)	12.9 (5th)
27	9 July 2014	13.9 (6th)	13.0 (6th)
28	10 July 2014	14.4 (4th)	13.2 (6th)
29	13 July 2014	13.1 (5th)	13.4 (5th)
30	14 July 2014	14.6 (4th)	14.4 (4th)
31	15 July 2014	13.8 (4th)	14.6 (4th)
32	16 July 2014	13.8 (4th)	12.6 (6th)
33	17 July 2014	16.4 (3rd)	15.7 (4th)
34	18 July 2014	13.7 (4th)	13.0 (5th)
35	21 July 2014	14.6 (3rd)	14.6 (3rd)
36	22 July 2014	14.1 (3rd)	14.6 (3rd)
37	23 July 2014	14.3 (3rd)	14.5 (3rd)
38	24 July 2014	14.8 (3rd)	14.3 (3rd)
39	25 July 2014	15.1 (3rd)	14.0 (3rd)
40	29 July 2014	13.4 (3rd)	13.7 (3rd)
41	30 July 2014	13.0 (3rd)	12.9 (3rd)
42	31 July 2014	13.9 (3rd)	14.1 (3rd)
43	1 August 2014	13.6 (3rd)	13.4 (4th)
44	4 August 2014	14.8 (3rd)	14.7 (3rd)
45	5 August 2014	14.4 (3rd)	14.7 (4th)
46	6 August 2014	15.0 (3rd)	15.7 (3rd)
47	7 August 2014	13.7 (3rd)	13.7 (4th)
48	8 August 2014	15.5 (3rd)	15.0 (4th)
49	11 August 2014	16.6 (3rd)	17.3 (3rd)
50	12 August 2014	15.4 (3rd)	16.2 (3rd)
51	13 August 2014	17.5 (3rd)	18.0 (2nd)
52	14 August 2014	18.8 (2nd)	17.1 (2nd)
53	15 August 2014	16.6 (3rd)	16.8 (3rd)
54	18 August 2014	19.4 (2nd)	18.5 (3rd)
55	19 August 2014	16.9 (3rd)	17.0 (3rd)
56	20 August 2014	18.4 (2nd)	17.5 (2nd)
57	21 August 2014	19.2 (2nd)	19.0 (1st)
58	22 August 2014	17.5 (2nd)	16.7. (2nd)
59	25 August 2014	19.7 (3rd)	18.2 (3rd)
60	26 August 2014	18.2 (2nd)	17.8 (2nd)
61	27 August 2014	17.8 (3rd)	17.0 (3rd)
62	28 August 2014	19.0 (2nd)	18.3 (2nd)
63	29 August 2014	18.7 (2nd)	18.1 (2nd)
64	1 September 2014	19.3 (2nd)	19.9 (2nd)
65	2 September 2014	19.4 (2nd)	19.1 (2nd)
66	3 September 2014	19.1 (2nd)	19.1 (2nd)
67	4 September 2014	18.8 (2nd)	18.6 (2nd)
68	9 September 2014	11.6 (5th)	11.5 (7th)
69	10 September 2014	18.7 (2nd)	18.4 (3rd)
70	11 September 2014	20.2 (2nd)	19.7 (2nd)
71	12 September 2014	19.6 (2nd)	19.3 (2nd)
72	15 September 2014	20.8 (2nd)	19.9 (2nd)
73	16 September 2014	20.7 (2nd)	18.8 (2nd)
74	18 September 2014	21.4 (2nd)	21.0 (2nd)
75	22 September 2014	16.0 (3rd)	16.0 (3rd)
76	26 September 2014	15.0 (4th)	14.9 (5th)
77	29 September 2014	16.1 (2nd)	15.6 (2nd)
78	30 September 2014	16.3 (2nd)	16.6 (2nd)
79	3 October 2014	15.3 (3rd)	15.3 (3rd)
80	6 October 2014	21.2 (2nd)	20.2 (2nd)
81	7 October 2014	19.2 (2nd)	19.1 (2nd)
82	8 October 2014	19.8 (2nd)	19.0 (2nd)
83	9 October 2014	19.7 (2nd)	19.7 (2nd)
84	10 October 2014	19.6 (2nd)	19.2 (1st)
85	13 October 2014	21.5 (2nd)	19.3 (2nd)
86	14 October 2014	19.2 (2nd)	18.4 (2nd)
87	15 October 2014	20.0 (2nd)	18.7 (2nd)
88	16 October 2014	22.5 (2nd)	21.3 (2nd)
89	17 October 2014	21.3 (2nd)	20.1 (2nd)
90	20 October 2014	23.1 (2nd)	22.6 (2nd)
91	21 October 2014	23.0 (2nd)	21.0 (2nd)
92	22 October 2014	22.6 (2nd)	20.5 (2nd)
93	23 October 2014	22.4 (2nd)	21.4 (2nd)
94	24 October 2014	22.3 (2nd)	21.7 (1st)
95	27 October 2014	23.4 (2nd)	21.9 (2nd)
96	28 October 2014	22.0 (2nd)	21.1 (2nd)
97	29 October 2014	22.6 (2nd)	21.2 (2nd)
98	31 October 2014	20.1 (2nd)	20.6 (2nd)
99	3 November 2014	23.3 (2nd)	22.4 (2nd)
100	4 November 2014	24.2 (2nd)	23.8 (1st)
101	6 November 2014	22.9 (2nd)	22.2 (2nd)
102	7 November 2014	21.5 (2nd)	21.4 (1st)
Average		17.0%	16.7%

=== Ratings in the Philippines ===
In the Philippines, Two Mothers was aired on GMA Network on April 6, 2015 every weekdays at 10:00 a.m. PST. The drama was dubbed in Filipino and ran for 30 weeks having 150 equivalent episodes. It was later re-aired on GMA News TV from June 5 to August 25, 2017.

Ratings in the Philippines
Episode # (in PH)	Broadcast date	Average audience share	
Episode # (in PH)	Broadcast date	AGB Nielsen	Kantar Media
Episode # (in PH)	Broadcast date	Mega Manila	Nationwide
1	April 6, 2015	10.4%	9.2%
2	April 7, 2015	10.4%	7.6%
3	April 8, 2015	11.4%	8.2%
4	April 9, 2015	10.3%	9.3%
5	April 10, 2015	9.9%	9.1%
6	April 13, 2015	10.4%	8.7%
7	April 14, 2015	12.1%	8.6%
8	April 15, 2015	11.1%	8.4%
9	April 16, 2015	12.1%	10.6%
10	April 17, 2015	10.7%	8.9%
11	April 20, 2015	11.1%	9.0%
12	April 21, 2015	11.2%	8.6%
13	April 22, 2015	11.6%	9.5%
14	April 23, 2015	12.2%	9.4%
15	April 24, 2015	11.3%	9.1%
16	April 27, 2015	9.4%	9.8%
17	April 28, 2015	10.2%	9.2%
18	April 29, 2015	11.4%	9.7%
19	April 30, 2015	12.1%	9.8%
20	May 1, 2015	10.9%	9.3%
21	May 4, 2015	8.5%	8.0%
22	May 5, 2015	9.3%	9.0%
23	May 6, 2015	10.5%	8.5%
24	May 7, 2015	9.5%	9.7%
25	May 8, 2015	10.3%	9.1%
26	May 11, 2015	9.2%	8.4%
27	May 12, 2015	9.8%	9.0%
28	May 13, 2015	9.1%	8.9%
29	May 14, 2015	9.3%	8.7%
30	May 15, 2015	9.3%	9.3%
31	May 18, 2015	9.3%	8.5%
32	May 19, 2015	10.3%	8.3%
33	May 20, 2015	9.8%	9.1%
34	May 21, 2015	11.8%	10.5%
35	May 22, 2015	10.6%	8.5%
36	May 25, 2015	11.8%	8.9%
37	May 26, 2015	9.1%	8.4%
38	May 27, 2015	10.9%	9.7%
39	May 28, 2015	11.4%	10.4%
40	May 29, 2015	11.1%	8.6%
41	June 1, 2015	10.5%	6.4%
42	June 2, 2015	10.2%	7.0%
43	June 3, 2015	11.0%	—N/a
44	June 4, 2015	10.2%	7.0%
45	June 5, 2015	11.3%	8.3%
46	June 8, 2015	9.1%	8.0%
47	June 9, 2015	11.0%	6.7%
48	June 10, 2015	9.5%	7.9%
49	June 11, 2015	9.4%	6.6%
50	June 12, 2015	9.8%	9.8%
51	June 15, 2015	9.4%	7.8%
52	June 16, 2015	9.5%	6.9%
53	June 17, 2015	9.3%	8.2%
54	June 18, 2015	9.0%	6.1%
55	June 19, 2015	9.2%	8.1%
56	June 22, 2015	9.2%	7.1%
57	June 23, 2015	7.8%	8.0%
58	June 24, 2015	8.6%	7.7%
59	June 25, 2015	10.1%	7.1%
60	June 26, 2015	9.0%	7.3%
61	June 29, 2015	8.6%	6.0%
62	June 30, 2015	9.5%	7.4%
63	July 1, 2015	10.0%	6.6%
64	July 2, 2015	9.1%	6.0%
65	July 3, 2015	9.4%	6.6%
66	July 6, 2015	11.4%	6.5%
67	July 7, 2015	9.2%	6.6%
68	July 8, 2015	12.0%	7.1%
69	July 9, 2015	12.3%	8.2%
70	July 10, 2015	12.1%	8.5%
71	July 13, 2015	8.2%	7.1%
72	July 14, 2015	10.4%	6.3%
73	July 15, 2015	10.8%	7.0%
74	July 16, 2015	9.1%	6.9%
75	July 17, 2015	10.4%	8.1%
76	July 20, 2015	9.4%	6.9%
77	July 21, 2015	10.9%	6.4%
78	July 22, 2015	10.1%	5.9%
79	July 23, 2015	10.7%	7.3%
80	July 24, 2015	11.0%	7.0%
81	July 27, 2015	10.7%	7.4%
82	July 28, 2015	11.0%	7.4%
83	July 29, 2015	11.9%	7.8%
84	July 30, 2015	10.6%	6.8%
85	July 31, 2015	11.1%	6.8%
86	August 3, 2015	10.7%	7.6%
87	August 4, 2015	11.6%	8.3%
88	August 5, 2015	11.5%	7.5%
89	August 6, 2015	10.8%	7.6%
90	August 7, 2015	12.5%	7.6%
91	August 10, 2015	11.8%	7.3%
92	August 11, 2015	12.3%	7.7%
93	August 12, 2015	13.0%	8.7%
94	August 13, 2015	12.4%	9.0%
95	August 14, 2015	11.8%	7.9%
96	August 17, 2015	12.6%	8.6%
97	August 18, 2015	12.6%	7.9%
98	August 19, 2015	13.0%	8.9%
99	August 20, 2015	12.0%	8.1%
100	August 21, 2015	14.5%	8.0%
101	August 24, 2015	13.7%	9.2%
102	August 25, 2015	13.5%	7.4%
103	August 26, 2015	12.7%	7.4%
104	August 27, 2015	12.9%	8.0%
105	August 28, 2015	13.1%	7.8%
106	August 31, 2015	13.0%	8.5%
107	September 1, 2015	11.5%	7.5%
108.	September 2, 2015	13.2%	7.4%
109	September 3, 2015	12.1%	7.5%
110	September 4, 2015	13.0%	7.2%
111	September 7, 2015	13.1%	8.1%
112	September 8, 2015	13.5%	8.3%
113	September 9, 2015	12.7%	8.1%
114	September 10, 2015	12.2%	8.3%
115	September 11, 2015	14.1%	7.8%
116	September 14, 2015	11.8%	7.7%
117	September 15, 2015	13.3%	8.3%
118	September 16, 2015	12.1%	7.6%
119	September 17, 2015	11.9%	7.2%
120	September 18, 2015	12.8%	7.1%
121	September 21, 2015	11.3%	7.4%
122	September 22, 2015	13.0%	7.9%
123	September 23, 2015	12.9%	7.3%
124	September 24, 2015	12.0%	7.8%
125	September 25, 2015	14.2%	8.8%
126	September 28, 2015	12.1%	8.0%
127	September 29, 2015	12.4%	8.8%
128	September 30, 2015	14.5%	8.6%
129	October 1, 2015	14.4%	8.3%
130	October 2, 2015	16.2%	10.3%
131	October 5, 2015	12.6%	9.1%
132	October 6, 2015	13.1%	10.3%
133	October 7, 2015	12.7%	8.5%
134	October 8, 2015	13.7%	8.7%
135	October 9, 2015	14.3%	9.3%
136	October 12, 2015	13.3%	9.9%
137	October 13, 2015	14.8%	9.2%
138	October 14, 2015	13.7%	8.6%
139	October 15, 2015	13.4%	8.3%
140	October 16, 2015	14.3%	9.8%
141	October 19, 2015	15.4%	8.4%
142	October 20, 2015	13.9%	8.5%
143	October 21, 2015	14.2%	9.2%
144	October 22, 2015	12.4%	8.1%
145	October 23, 2015	14.4%	9.3%
146	October 26, 2015	12.2%	9.1%
147	October 27, 2015	10.7%	8.2%
148	October 28, 2015	12.1%	8.8%
149	October 29, 2015	12.2%	9.6%
150	October 30, 2015	13.2%	9.2%
Average		11.4%	8.2%

== Awards and nominations ==
Year	Award	Category	Recipient	Result
2014	3rd APAN Star Awards	Top Excellence Award, Actress in a Serial Drama	Jang Seo-hee	Nominated
2014	28th KBS Drama Awards	Top Excellence Award, Actress	Jang Seo-hee	Nominated
2014	28th KBS Drama Awards	Excellence Award, Actor in a Daily Drama	Hwang Dong-joo	Nominated
2014	28th KBS Drama Awards	Excellence Award, Actress in a Daily Drama	Jang Seo-hee	Nominated
2014	28th KBS Drama Awards	Best Supporting Actress	Lee Chae-young	Won
