= Land of Gold =

2014 South Korean television series

- Promotional poster
- Also known as: Golden Land; Gold Land
- Genre: Romance; Family
- Written by: Lee Seon-hee
- Directed by: Shin Hyun-soo
- Starring: Kang Ye-sol; Kang Eun-tak; Baek Seung-hee; Lee Byung-hoon
- Country of origin: South Korea
- Original language: Korean
- No. of episodes: 163

Production
- Executive producer: Kim Sung-geun
- Running time: Mondays to Fridays at 09:00 (KST)

Original release
- Network: KBS2
- Release: January 6 – August 22, 2014

Land of Gold (Korean: TV소설 순금의 땅; RR: TVsoseol sungeumui ttang) is a 2014 South Korean morning soap opera broadcast by KBS2 starring Kang Ye-sol, Kang Eun-tak, Baek Seung-hee and Lee Byung-hoon. It premiered on January 6, 2014, airing from Mondays to Fridays at 9:00 a.m. for 163 episodes.

== Cast ==
- Kang Ye-sol as Jung Soon-geum
  - Park Ha-young as young Soon-geum
- Kang Eun-tak as Kang Woo-chang
  - Uhm Do-hyun as young Woo-chang
- Baek Seung-hee as Han Jin-kyung
  - Ahn Eun-jung as young Jin-kyung
- Lee Byung-hoon as Yoon Jung-soo
  - Jung Jae-min as young Jung-soo
- Kwon Oh-hyun as Jung Soo-bok
- Song Young-jae as Kim Bong-dal
- Kim Jin-gook as Woo-chang's father
- Lee Hwa-young as Deok-goo's mother
- Jo Seon-hyung as Jang Deok-goo
  - Hyun Seok-joon as young Deok-goo
- Jeon Won-joo as Inn owner
- Park Ha-eun as Deok-boon
- Jung Ae-ri as Madam Sewoondang
- Kim Myung-soo as Han Chi-soo
- Kim Do-yeon as Ji Yeon-hee
- Yoo Seung-bong as Haeng Rang-ah-bum
- Shin So-yi as young Jo Mi-ja
- Jo Hye-sun as Jo Hyang-ja
  - Kim Esther as young Jo Hyang-ja
- Cha Da-young as Mi-soon
- Park Sung-il as Dok-sa
- Kim Young-bae as Yang Bang-gi
- Song Kyung-hoon as Han Jae-il
  - Jo Sung-beom as young Jae-il
- Lee Hyun-kyung as Seo In-ok
- Choi Chang-yeob as Yoon Young-soo
  - In Ji-won as young Young-soo
- Yoo Ah-mi as Ssera
- Choi Jong-nam as Yak Jae-sang
- Kim Joo-young as Park In-tae
- Shim Yang-hong as Chairman Baek
- Park Hye-young as Seo Hyun-jae
- Shin Cheol-jin as Chairman Lee
- Jung Yoo-geun as Kang Jin-woo
- Im Jae-geun as Hwang Gae-dong

== Awards and nominations ==
Year	Award	Category	Recipient	Result
2014	22nd Korea Culture and Entertainment Awards	Best Supporting Actor in a Drama	Choi Jong-nam	Won
2014	KBS Drama Awards	Excellence Award, Actor in a Daily Drama	Kang Eun-tak	Nominated
2014	KBS Drama Awards	Excellence Award, Actress in a Daily Drama	Kang Ye-sol	Nominated
2014	KBS Drama Awards	Best Young Actor	Jung Jae-min	Nominated
2014	KBS Drama Awards	Best Young Actress	Park Ha-young	Nominated
