= Kang Eun-tak =

South Korean actor (born 1982)

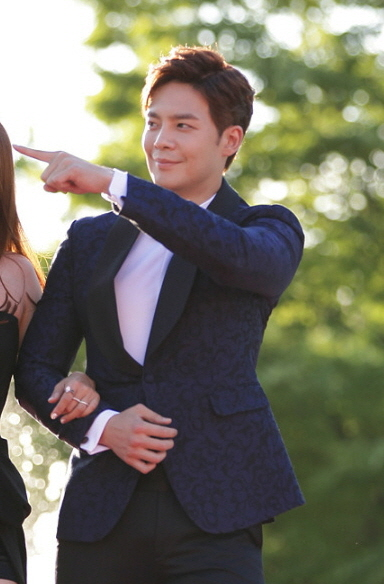
- Kang at BiFan 2015
- Born: Shin Seul-gi; August 16, 1982 (age 44); South Korea
- Education: Seoul Institute of the Arts (Department of Theatre)
- Occupation: Actor
- Years active: 2006–present
- Agent: Management Pieona
- Spouse: Unknown (m. 2024)
- Parent: Shin Woo-cheol (father)

Korean name
- Hangul: 신슬기
- RR: Sin Seulgi
- MR: Sin Sŭlgi

Stage name
- Hangul: 강은탁
- RR: Gang Euntak
- MR: Kang Ŭnt'ak

Shin Seul-gi (Korean: 신슬기; born August 16, 1982), better known by the stage name Kang Eun-tak (강은탁), is a South Korean actor. He is best known for his leading roles in the television series Land of Gold (2014), Apgujeong Midnight Sun (2014–2015), and Bubbly Lovely (2016–2017).

== Personal life ==
=== Relationships and marriage ===
In November 2018, it was confirmed by their respective agencies that Kang and his Love to the End co-star Lee Young-ah have been dating since October 2018. In April 2019, it was confirmed by their respective agencies that Kang and Lee Young-ah had ended their relationship earlier that year.

On April 29, 2024, it was announced that Kang would marry his non-celebrity girlfriend in May after dating for two years. They married on May 11 in Seoul.

== Filmography ==
=== Television series ===
Year	Title	Role	Network
2006	Jumong	Chan-soo	MBC
2008	East of Eden	Han Soo-jae	MBC
2010	Happiness in the Wind	Choi Ki-chul	KBS1
2014	Land of Gold	Kang Woo-chang	KBS2
2014	Apgujeong Midnight Sun	Jang Hwa-eom	MBC
2015	Beautiful You	Ha Jin-hyung	MBC
2015	Great Stories: I.M.Father	Kang Ji-ho after 2015 (Cameo)	TV Chosun
2016	Bubbly Lovely	Park Woo-hyuk	SBS
2018	Love to the End	Yoon Jung-han	KBS2
2020	Man in a Veil	Lee Taepung	KBS2
2021	Young Lady and Gentleman	Cha-gun	KBS2

=== Film ===
Year	Title	Role
2013	Secretly, Greatly	NIS Agent
2014	The Road Called Life	Student at copper mine (segment "A Lucky Day")
2015	Sunshine	Kang Shin-woong

=== Music video appearances ===
Year	Song title	Artist
2013	"After Breakup"	Kiroy Y

== Awards and nominations ==
Year	Award	Category	Nominated work	Result	Ref.
2014	28th KBS Drama Awards	Excellence Award, Actor in a Daily Drama	Land of Gold	Nominated	
2015	34th MBC Drama Awards	Best New Actor in a Serial Drama	Apgujeong Midnight Sun	Won	
2017	25th SBS Drama Awards	Top Excellence Award, Actor in a Daily/Weekend Drama	Bubbly Lovely	Nominated	
2018	32nd KBS Drama Awards	Excellence Award, Actor in a Daily Drama	Love to the End	Won	
2020	34th KBS Drama Awards	Excellence Award, Actor in a Daily Drama	Man in a Veil	Won	
2020	7th APAN Star Awards	Excellence Award, Actor in Serial Drama	Man in a Veil	Nominated	
2021	KBS Drama Awards	Excellence Award, Actor in Serial Drama	Young Lady and Gentleman	Nominated	
2022	8th APAN Star Awards	Excellence Award, Actor in Serial Drama	Young Lady and Gentleman	Nominated	
