= Mysterious Personal Shopper =

2018 South Korean television series

- Promotional poster
- Hangul: 인형의 집
- Lit.: Doll's House
- RR: Inhyeongui jip
- MR: Inhyŏngŭi chip
- Genre: Family; Drama; Revenge; Suspense
- Created by: KBS Drama Production (KBS 드라마 제작국)
- Written by: Kim Ye-na; Lee Jung-dae
- Directed by: Kim Sang-hwi
- Starring: Choi Myung-gil; Park Ha-na; Wang Bit-na; Lee Eun-hyung; Han Sang-jin
- Music by: Lee Chang-hee
- Country of origin: South Korea
- Original language: Korean
- No. of episodes: 103 (Note: Originally scheduled to air for 100 episodes, the series was extended by three episodes in lieu of two pre-empts.)

Production
- Executive producers: Kim Jae-il; Park Ho-kyung
- Camera setup: Single camera
- Running time: 35 min
- Production company: Hidden Picture Media

Original release
- Network: KBS2
- Release: February 26 – July 20, 2018

Mysterious Personal Shopper (Korean: 인형의 집) is a 2018 South Korean television series starring Choi Myung-gil, Park Ha-na, Wang Bit-na, Lee Eun-hyung, and Han Sang-jin. The series aired on KBS2 from Monday to Friday from 7:50 p.m. to 8:30 p.m. (KST) from February 26 to July 20, 2018.

== Synopsis ==
Centered around the fashion tycoon President Eun's family, the mystery hidden inside the mansion is unveiled in an unpredictable way through the relationships and feuds between various people.

== Cast ==
=== Main ===
- Choi Myung-gil as Geum Young-sook
- Park Ha-na as Hong Se-yeon
- Wang Bit-na as Eun Kyung-hye
- Lee Eun-hyung as Lee Jae-joon
- Han Sang-jin as Jang Myung-hwan

=== Supporting ===
- Lee Kwan-hoon as Yoo Shin-hyuk
- Lee Ho-jae as Eun Ki-tae
- Lee Han-wi as Hong Pil-mok
- Jung Soo-young as Hong Sun-hee
- Kim Ki-doo as Hong Chul-soo
- Kim Ji-sung as Hong Kang-hee
- Park Hyun-sook as Park Soo-ran
- Shim Jin-hwa as Shin Young-ae
- Yoo Seo-jin as Kim Hyo-jung
- Jung Jung-ah as Jeon Hyun-joo
- Park Jae-woong as Na Jin-beom
- Kim Kwang-young as Ma Dong-seok
- Bae Noo-ri as Kkot-nim / Lee Jae-young
- Jo Mi-ryung as Eun Sook-ja
- Seo Hye-jin as Goo Sa-ra
- Lee Ah-rin as Sa Cha-soon
- Kim Yoo-jin as Na Ae-ri
- Choi Jong-tae as Myung Hyun-joon
- Lee Myung-ho as Min Woo-hyuk
- Gong Jung-hwan as Pierre Jang (Jang Hyuk-pil)

== Viewership ==
- In this table, The blue numbers represent the lowest ratings and the red numbers represent the highest ratings.
- TNmS stop publishing their report from June 2018.

Ep.	Original broadcast date	Average audience share			
Ep.	Original broadcast date	TNmS Ratings		AGB Nielsen	
Ep.	Original broadcast date	Nationwide	Seoul National Capital Area	Nationwide	Seoul National Capital Area
1	February 26, 2018	17.5% (3rd)	13.8%	13.6% (3rd)	12.7% (3rd)
2	February 27, 2018	17.6% (2nd)	14.1%	14.4% (3rd)	12.9% (3rd)
3	February 28, 2018	17.9% (2nd)	14.2%	14.8% (4th)	13.1% (4th)
4	March 1, 2018	17.5% (2nd)	13.9%	13.7% (4th)	12.1% (6th)
5	March 2, 2018	17.6% (2nd)	14.1%	14.3% (4th)	13.0% (4th)
6	March 5, 2018	18.8% (3rd)	15.2%	14.4% (3rd)	12.8% (4th)
7	March 6, 2018	18.2% (3rd)	14.4%	13.7% (3rd)	12.9% (4th)
8	March 7, 2018	19.2% (2nd)	14.8%	14.4% (4th)	13.0% (5th)
9	March 8, 2018	17.4% (2nd)	12.7%	14.1% (4th)	12.4% (5th)
10	March 9, 2018	17.6% (1st)	12.9%	14.2% (1st)	13.0% (1st)
11	March 12, 2018	18.4% (2nd)	15.1%	14.0% (3rd)	12.7% (3rd)
12	March 13, 2018	18.2% (2nd)	14.3%	14.5% (3rd)	12.6% (3rd)
13	March 14, 2018	17.1% (2nd)	12.9%	13.3% (4th)	12.1% (5th)
14	March 15, 2018	17.7% (2nd)	14.1%	14.7% (3rd)	13.2% (4th)
15	March 16, 2018	18.3% (2nd)	14.7%	12.8% (3rd)	11.3% (5th)
16	March 19, 2018	18.5% (2nd)	14.8%	14.9% (3rd)	13.1% (3rd)
17	March 20, 2018	19.5% (2nd)	15.7%	15.1% (2nd)	13.3% (3rd)
18	March 21, 2018	18.6% (2nd)	15.0%	15.4% (4th)	14.8% (4th)
19	March 22, 2018	18.1% (2nd)	14.2%	15.1% (3rd)	14.0% (4th)
20	March 23, 2018	18.9% (2nd)	15.6%	13.9% (3rd)	12.7% (4th)
21	March 26, 2018	18.2% (2nd)	14.3%	14.1% (3rd)	12.8% (3rd)
22	March 27, 2018	17.3% (2nd)	13.0%	14.5% (3rd)	13.2% (3rd)
23	March 28, 2018	15.7% (2nd)	11.4%	13.3% (3rd)	12.0% (3rd)
24	March 29, 2018	17.4% (2nd)	13.6%	14.2% (2nd)	13.4% (2nd)
25	March 30, 2018	15.5% (2nd)	11.1%	12.3% (5th)	11.2% (5th)
26	April 2, 2018	17.0% (3rd)	12.8%	13.2% (3rd)	12.0% (4th)
27	April 3, 2018	17.0% (2nd)	13.2%	13.6% (3rd)	11.7% (3rd)
28	April 4, 2018	16.6% (2nd)	12.5%	14.3% (2nd)	13.2% (2nd)
29	April 5, 2018	16.5% (1st)	12.3%	13.6% (2nd)	12.8% (2nd)
30	April 6, 2018	15.8% (2nd)	11.4%	12.2% (4th)	10.8% (9th)
31	April 9, 2018	17.7% (2nd)	14.1%	14.7% (3rd)	13.2% (3rd)
32	April 10, 2018	16.8% (2nd)	13.1%	14.8% (2nd)	14.2% (2nd)
33	April 11, 2018	16.6% (2nd)	12.7%	13.5% (2nd)	12.6% (2nd)
34	April 12, 2018	16.1% (2nd)	11.8%	13.6% (2nd)	12.3% (3rd)
35	April 13, 2018	17.4% (2nd)	13.6%	13.9% (3rd)	13.1% (3rd)
36	April 16, 2018	17.0% (2nd)	12.9%	13.1% (3rd)	12.0% (3rd)
37	April 17, 2018	18.1% (2nd)	14.7%	13.9% (3rd)	12.5% (3rd)
38	April 18, 2018	17.4% (2nd)	13.3%	13.5% (2nd)	12.5% (2nd)
39	April 19, 2018	17.1% (2nd)	13.0%	13.1% (2nd)	12.1% (2nd)
40	April 20, 2018	17.9% (2nd)	14.3%	13.5% (2nd)	11.9% (4th)
41	April 23, 2018	18.5% (2nd)	14.7%	14.5% (3rd)	12.6% (3rd)
42	April 24, 2018	19.3% (2nd)	15.2%	15.0% (2nd)	12.9% (2nd)
43	April 25, 2018	16.6% (2nd)	12.7%	14.8% (2nd)	14.0% (2nd)
44	April 26, 2018	15.4% (2nd)	11.0%	14.3% (2nd)	12.9% (3rd)
45	April 27, 2018	11.8% (1st)	8.1%	10.2% (2nd)	9.5% (3rd)
46	April 30, 2018	16.6% (3rd)	12.5%	13.4% (3rd)	12.3% (4th)
47	May 1, 2018	16.0% (2nd)	12.3%	14.6% (2nd)	12.9% (3rd)
48	May 2, 2018	14.2% (2nd)	9.8%	15.2% (2nd)	13.9% (2nd)
49	May 3, 2018	15.5% (2nd)	11.4%	13.9% (3rd)	12.8% (3rd)
50	May 4, 2018	15.5% (2nd)	11.7%	14.1% (3rd)	12.9% (3rd)
51	May 7, 2018	16.1% (2nd)	12.3%	13.6% (3rd)	12.4% (3rd)
52	May 8, 2018	16.2% (2nd)	12.0%	13.2% (3rd)	11.7% (3rd)
53	May 9, 2018	16.6% (2nd)	12.4%	13.8% (2nd)	12.5% (2nd)
54	May 10, 2018	16.8% (2nd)	12.6%	14.1% (2nd)	12.7% (2nd)
55	May 11, 2018	17.1% (2nd)	12.9%	14.1% (1st)	13.0% (1st)
56	May 14, 2018	17.0% (2nd)	12.8%	13.9% (3rd)	12.0% (3rd)
57	May 15, 2018	16.3% (2nd)	12.0%	14.1% (2nd)	12.8% (3rd)
58	May 16, 2018	16.4% (2nd)	12.2%	15.1% (1st)	13.9% (2nd)
59	May 17, 2018	17.2% (2nd)	13.0%	14.2% (2nd)	12.8% (2nd)
60	May 18, 2018	16.2% (2nd)	12.0%	14.3% (2nd)	12.4% (3rd)
61	May 21, 2018	17.2% (2nd)	12.9%	13.4% (3rd)	12.1% (2nd)
62	May 22, 2018	15.6% (2nd)	11.3%	16.2% (1st)	14.4% (2nd)
63	May 23, 2018	18.2% (2nd)	13.9%	14.1% (2nd)	12.8% (2nd)
64	May 24, 2018	17.4% (2nd)	13.3%	13.8% (3rd)	12.7% (3rd)
65	May 25, 2018	17.6% (2nd)	13.5%	13.6% (3rd)	12.0% (4th)
66	May 29, 2018 (Note: No episode was aired on May 28 due to coverage of the FIFA Friendly soccer match between South Korea and Honduras.)	19.0% (2nd)	15.3%	15.1% (2nd)	14.2% (2nd)
67	May 30, 2018	17.1% (2nd)	12.7%	13.8% (2nd)	12.5% (2nd)
68	May 31, 2018	16.4% (2nd)	12.7%	12.9% (2nd)	12.2% (3rd)
69	June 1, 2018	14.1%	10.3%	12.6% (3rd)	11.8% (3rd)
70	June 4, 2018	15.6%	11.9%	13.3% (3rd)	12.6% (3rd)
71	June 5, 2018	14.5%	10.7%	12.4% (3rd)	10.9% (3rd)
72	June 6, 2018	14.6%	10.8%	13.7% (3rd)	12.9% (3rd)
73	June 7, 2018	15.2%	11.3%	13.7% (2nd)	12.8% (2nd)
74	June 8, 2018	15.5%	11.7%	12.9% (3rd)	12.2% (3rd)
75	June 11, 2018	16.4%	12.5%	14.1% (3rd)	13.0% (3rd)
76	June 12, 2018	14.9%	10.8%	12.2% (1st)	10.2% (1st)
77	June 13, 2018	13.9%	9.4%	11.9% (1st)	11.5% (1st)
78	June 14, 2018	15.0%	10.9%	13.5% (3rd)	12.3% (3rd)
79	June 15, 2018	15.7%	11.6%	12.7% (2nd)	11.2% (3rd)
80	June 19, 2018 (Note: No episode was aired on June 18 due to coverage of the 2018 FIFA World Cup Group F match between South Korea and Sweden.)	17.6%	13.7%	14.5% (2nd)	13.1% (2nd)
81	June 20, 2018	14.8%	10.9%	13.7% (2nd)	12.8% (2nd)
82	June 21, 2018	15.4%	11.3%	12.7% (2nd)	11.7% (2nd)
83	June 22, 2018	15.4%	11.6%	13.7% (2nd)	12.5% (3rd)
84	June 25, 2018	16.3%	12.4%	14.2% (3rd)	13.1% (3rd)
85	June 26, 2018	18.4%	14.0%	15.8% (2nd)	14.4% (2nd)
86	June 27, 2018	16.3%	12.5%	14.4% (4th)	13.6% (4th)
87	June 28, 2018	17.6%	13.3%	15.0% (3rd)	13.7% (3rd)
88	June 29, 2018	16.3%	12.2%	13.7% (3rd)	11.7% (4th)
89	July 2, 2018	16.7%	12.6%	15.0% (3rd)	13.9% (3rd)
90	July 3, 2018	16.7%	12.5%	14.4% (3rd)	12.2% (3rd)
91	July 4, 2018	15.4%	11.0%	13.9% (3rd)	12.5% (3rd)
92	July 5, 2018	16.2%	12.1%	13.9% (2nd)	11.8% (3rd)
93	July 6, 2018	15.3%	10.9%	13.4% (3rd)	11.5% (4th)
94	July 9, 2018	16.9%	12.7%	14.8% (3rd)	13.1% (3rd)
95	July 10, 2018	16.8%	12.5%	13.5% (3rd)	12.2% (3rd)
96	July 11, 2018	16.6%	12.3%	13.7% (2nd)	12.1% (2nd)
97	July 12, 2018	15.7%	11.2%	13.8% (2nd)	12.4% (2nd)
98	July 13, 2018	16.3%	12.0%	14.2% (2nd)	12.4% (4th)
99	July 16, 2018	16.8%	12.6%	13.9% (3rd)	12.7% (3rd)
100	July 17, 2018	15.4%	11.2%	12.6% (3rd)	11.4% (3rd)
101	July 18, 2018	15.7%	11.5%	13.3% (3rd)	11.9% (3rd)
102	July 19, 2018	15.6%	11.4%	13.2% (2nd)	12.2% (2nd)
103	July 20, 2018	16.3%	12.2%	13.7% (2nd)	12.7% (2nd)
Average		16.7%	%	13.9%	12.6%

== Awards and nominations ==
Year	Award	Category	Recipient	Result	Ref.
2018	11th Korea Drama Awards	Top Excellence Award, Actress	Wang Bit-na	Won	
2018	6th APAN Star Awards	Excellence Award, Actress in a Serial Drama	Wang Bit-na	Nominated	
2018	2018 KBS Drama Awards	Excellence Award, Actor in a Daily Drama	Han Sang-jin	Nominated	
2018	2018 KBS Drama Awards	Excellence Award, Actress in a Daily Drama	Park Ha-na	Won	
2018	2018 KBS Drama Awards	Excellence Award, Actress in a Daily Drama	Wang Bit-na	Nominated	
