= More Than a Maid =

2015 South Korean TV series

- Promotional poster
- Also known as: The Housemaids; The Servants
- Genre: Historical; Romance; Action
- Created by: JTBC
- Written by: Jo Hyun-kyung
- Directed by: Jo Hyun-tak
- Starring: Jeong Yu-mi; Oh Ji-ho; Kim Dong-wook
- Composer: Jeon Jung-hyuk
- Country of origin: South Korea
- Original language: Korean
- No. of episodes: 20

Production
- Executive producer: Park Jun-seo
- Producers: Park Sang-yeok; Jo Joon-hyung; Song Hyeong-joo
- Production company: Drama House (JTBC)

Original release
- Network: jTBC
- Release: December 12, 2014 – March 28, 2015

More Than a Maid (Korean: 하녀들; RR: Hanyeodeul; lit. 'Maids') is a 2015 South Korean television series starring Jeong Yu-mi, Oh Ji-ho, Kim Dong-wook, Lee Si-a, Jeon So-min and Lee Yi-kyung. It aired on jTBC from January 23 to March 28, 2015 on Fridays and Saturdays at 21:45 (KST) for 20 episodes.

== Synopsis ==
Guk In-yeob (Jeong Yu-mi) is the only daughter of a Joseon nobleman, and her beauty and style has her surrounded by plentiful admirers, among them Kim Eun-gi (Kim Dong-wook), a young scholar from an important family who's loved In-yeob since they were young. But one day In-yeob's father is branded a traitor, causing her family to be forced into ruin, and overnight the city's most popular young lady becomes a slave. In-yeob has difficulty adjusting from her pampered past to her present life as the lowly maid to her former rival. She learns to survive by her wits and befriends her fellow slaves, including Moo-myung (meaning "nameless"), a mysterious manservant who once saved her when she was still an aristocrat. Although Eun-gi remains devoted to In-yeob, her changed social status becomes an obstacle to his promising future, and meanwhile, she begins to fall for the stoic, level-headed but charismatic Moo-myung (Oh Ji-ho), who unbeknownst to all is a warrior on an undercover assignment regarding matters of political import.

== Cast ==
=== Main ===
- Jeong Yu-mi as Guk In-yeob, daughter of State Councilor
- Oh Ji-ho as Moo-myung / Lee Bi, head servant of Defense Minister's household
- Kim Dong-wook as Kim Eun-gi, son of Finance Minister
- Lee Si-a as Heo Yoon-ok, daughter of Defense Minister

=== State Councilor's household ===
- Jeon No-min as Guk Yoo, Guk In-yeob's father
- Lee Cho-hee as Sawol-yi, Guk In-yeob's personal maid
- Im Hyun-sung as Poong-yi, servant
- Ji Seung-hyun as Duk-goo, Guk Yoo's personal servant

=== Defense Minister's household ===
- Park Chul-min as Heo Eung-cham, Defense Minister, Heo Yoon-ok's father
- Jeon Mi-seon as Lady Yoon, Heo Yoon-ok's mother
- Lee Yi-kyung as Heo Yoon-seo, Heo Yoon-ok's brother
- Lee El as Lady Kang, Heo Yoon-seo's wife
- Chae Gook-hee as Hae-sang, head maid
- Lee Yeon-kyung as Dan-ji's mother, maid
- Jeon So-min as Dan-ji's maid, Heo Yoon-seo's lover
- Jeon Soo-jin as Gaeddong-yi, Heo Yoon-ok's personal maid
- Kim Jong-hoon as Ddeok-soe, butcher
- Shim Hoon-ki as Yong-joon, servant
- Kim Hye-na as Ok-yi, maid

=== Finance Minister's household ===
- Kim Kap-soo as Kim Chi-kwon, Finance Minister, Kim Eun-gi's father
- Jin Hee-kyung as Lady Han, Kim Eun-gi's mother
- Yang Seung-pil as Ba-woo, servant

=== Others ===
- Ahn Nae-sang as Lee Bang-won, later King Taejong
- Lee Do-kyung as Lee Sung-gye, later King Taejo
- Lee Chae-young as Ga Hee-ah, kisaeng
- Uhm Tae-goo as Chi-bok, Man Wol warrior
- Oh Hee-joon as Hui-ju

== Production ==
The first episode originally aired on December 12, 2014, but a fire on December 13 destroyed the More Than a Maid set in Yeoncheon County and resulted in the death of one crew member, script coordinator Yeom Hye-sun. In the aftermath, the series went on hiatus for six weeks.

A new set was constructed in Yeongjongdo, and filming resumed on January 12, 2015. A re-edited version of the first episode aired on January 23, 2015.

== Ratings ==
Ep.	Original broadcast date	Average audience share		
Ep.	Original broadcast date	Nielsen Korea		TNmS
Ep.	Original broadcast date	Nationwide	Seoul	Nationwide
1	December 12, 2014	2.1%	N/A	N/A
1	January 23, 2015	N/A	N/A	N/A
2	January 24, 2015	1.7%	N/A	1.2%
3	January 30, 2015	1.6%	N/A	1.9%
4	January 31, 2015	1.9%	N/A	2.0%
5	February 6, 2015	2.2%	2.180%	2.3%
6	February 7, 2015	3.025%	3.086%	2.1%
7	February 13, 2015	3.048%	2.930%	2.6%
8	February 14, 2015	2.6%	N/A	2.8%
9	February 20, 2015	3.083%	2.745%	2.2%
10	February 21, 2015	3.484%	3.142%	2.6%
11	February 27, 2015	3.371%	3.241%	3.2%
12	February 28, 2015	3.215%	3.015%	2.6%
13	March 6, 2015	3.493%	3.281%	3.0%
14	March 7, 2015	3.271%	2.870%	2.8%
15	March 13, 2015	3.421%	3.497%	2.8%
16	March 14, 2015	4.675%	5.199%	3.5%
17	March 20, 2015	4.081%	3.779%	3.0%
18	March 21, 2015	4.001%	3.841%	3.2%
19	March 27, 2015	3.816%	3.984%	3.6%
20	March 28, 2015	4.725%	4.849%	4.7%
Average		3.140%	3.443%	2.7%

- In the table above, the blue numbers represent the lowest ratings and the red numbers represent the highest ratings.
- N/A denotes that the rating is not known.
- This drama aired on a cable channel/pay TV which normally has a relatively smaller audience compared to free-to-air TV/public broadcasters (KBS, SBS, MBC and EBS).

== Awards and nominations ==
Year	Award	Category	Recipient	Result
2015	8th Korea Drama Awards	Best Production Director	Jo Hyun-tak	Nominated
2015	8th Korea Drama Awards	Best Screenplay	Jo Hyun-kyung	Nominated

== International broadcast ==
Country	Network	Airing dates
South Korea	JTBC	December 12, 2014 – March 28, 2015 (every Friday and Saturday).
Taiwan	EBC	November 26, 2015 – January 1, 2016 (every Monday to Friday at 22:00 – 23:00).
Hong Kong	Drama Channel/HD Drama Channel	July 23 – August 27, 2016 (every Saturday at 19:00 – 00:00, July 23 at 22:00 – 00:00, August 27 at 19:00 – 22:00).
Singapore	VV Drama	July 8 – September 9, 2017 (every Saturday at 22:00 – 00:15).
Thailand	PPTV HD	November 29, 2015 (9:00 – ?).
Thailand	Channel 9 MCOT HD	December 17, 2017 – February 4, 2018 (every Saturday and Sunday from 22:00 to 23:30).
Philippines	GMA Network	January 1, 2018 under the title The Maid.
