= Word guessing =

Method for beginner readers

Word guessing is a method of reading in which a beginner reader does not know what a word is in a sentence, so they guess what the word is and read the rest of the sentence to confirm their guess.

== Example ==
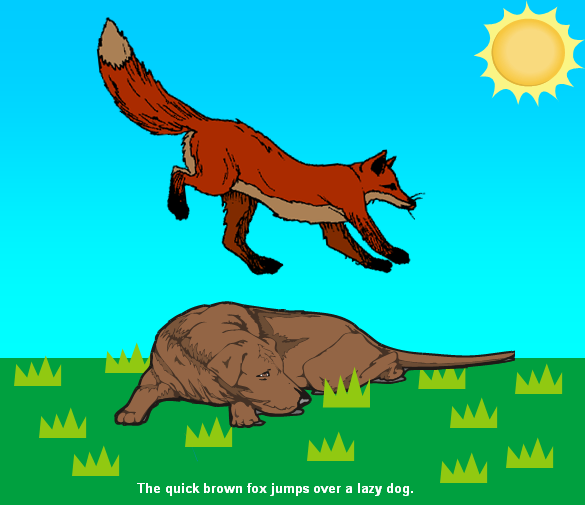
"The quick brown fox jumped over a lazy dog" illustrated

In the English pangram, "The quick brown fox jumped over a lazy dog", if the reader is unfamiliar with the word jumped, then they might read it as "joom-ped". After reading the rest of the sentence, they may realize that the word was actually the past tense of jump.

Pictures can be used to offer clues to the meaning of a word. If the sentence is illustrated, the reader may use that information to deduce the meaning of the sentence.

== Reception ==
Word guessing has been suggested as a method for teaching English-language learners (ELL) that fosters semantic mapping. Primary-school teachers, on the other hand, have criticized the strategy for creating bad habits and not teaching young readers about phonics.
