= Celltrion =

South Korean biopharmaceutical company

Celltrion, Inc.
- Type: Public
- Traded as: KRX: 068270; S&P Asia 50 component
- Industry: Biopharmaceutical
- Founded: 2002; 24 years ago
- Founder: Seo Jung-jin
- Headquarters: Yeonsu-gu, Incheon, South Korea
- Area served: Worldwide
- Key people: Seo Jung-jin, Chairman; Kee Woo-sung, CEO
- Products: Remsima™, Truxima™, Herzuma™, Biosimilar Drug
- Revenue: ▲ ₩4,162,500 million (2025)
- Operating income: ▲ ₩1,168,500 million (2025)
- Net income: ▲ ₩1,031,500 million (2025)
- Total assets: ▲ ₩22,334,900 million (2025)
- Total equity: ▲ ₩17,352,500 million (2025)
- Owner: Celltrion Holdings Co., Ltd. (23.03%); Ion Investments B.V. (9.54%); National Pension Service (6.07%)
- Number of employees: 2,995 (2025)
- Subsidiaries: Celltrion Entertainment
- Website: www.celltrion.com/en

Celltrion, Inc. (Korean: 주식회사 셀트리온) is a biopharmaceutical company headquartered in Incheon, South Korea. Celltrion Healthcare conducts worldwide marketing, sales, and distribution of biological medicines developed by Celltrion. In 2021, Celltrion's founder, Seo Jung-jin, was the richest person in South Korea.

== History ==
In 1999, Nexol, Inc. (now Celltrion Healthcare Co., Ltd.) was founded as a global business management consulting firm. In 2002, Celltrion, Inc. was founded as a biopharmaceutical company.

In 2008, Nexol and Celltrion established a global distribution agreement.

In 2009, distribution channels were established in America, Oceania, Europe (Hospira) and Nexol, Inc. renamed as Celltrion Healthcare Co., Ltd.

In 2010, distribution channels were established in Japan (Nippon Kayaku), Commonwealth of Independent States (CIS), Eastern Europe, and the Middle East (Egis).

In 2013, distribution channels were added in Europe (Mundipharma, Biogaran, and Kern).

On September 30, 2024, Celltrion completed the establishment of its oversees corporation in Vietnam. 22 Oct. 2024. Celltrion secured a 100.4 billion won ($72.8 million) deal for contract development and manufacturing (CDMO) with TEVA Pharmaceuticals International for the migraine treatment Ajovy.

In November 2024, Celltrion acquired iQone Healthcare Switzerland, a pharmaceutical company for around 30 billion won ($21 million). This move will help its expansion in Europe.

In January 2026, Celltrion began operating the production facility it acquired in 2025 from Eli Lilly in Branchburg, New Jersey. In May, Celltrion acquired French health care firm Gifrer. In June, the company's first union was established.

== Products ==
The company's products are manufactured at mammalian cell culture facilities designed and built to comply with the United States FDA’s cGMP, and the European Medicines Agency’s GMP standards.

=== Inline product ===
Remsima (infliximab) is a biosimilar monoclonal antibody against tumor necrosis factor alpha (TNF-α), approved by the European Medicines Agency (EMA) for treatment of:

1. rheumatoid arthritis,
2. adult Crohn's disease,
3. pediatric Crohn's disease,
4. ulcerative colitis,
5. pediatric ulcerative colitis,
6. ankylosing spondylitis,
7. psoriatic arthritis, and
8. psoriasis.

In 2012 Remsima was approved by the Republic of Korea's Ministry of Food and Drug Safety (MFDS), previously known as Korea Food and Drug Administration and in 2013 it became the world's first biosimilar monoclonal antibody (mAb) approved by the EMA.

Herzuma is a biosimilar trastuzumab approved by the MFDS for treatment of early and advanced (metastatic) HER2+ breast cancer as well as advanced (metastatic) stomach cancer. Herzuma is a HER2+ breast cancer therapy designed to treat aggressive HER positive metastatic and adjuvant breast cancer, as well as HER2 positive adenocarcinoma of the stomach that has spread (metastatic or advanced gastric cancer).

Truxima (previously known as CT-P10) is the first biosimilar of the reference monoclonal antibody rituximab that targets CD20 molecule primarily found on the surface of B-cells. Its target indications are rheumatoid arthritis, non-Hodgkin lymphoma and chronic lymphocytic leukemia. It was approved by the EMA in February 2017.

== Corporate Governance ==
Company name	Shareholding ratio
Celltrion Holdings	20.05%
Korea National Pension Service	7.26%
Celltrion Skincure	2.11%
As of Sep 2023.

== See also ==
- List of pharmaceutical companies
