= Seo Jung-jin (businessman) =

South Korean billionaire (born 1957)

- 서정진
- Born: October 23, 1957 (age 69); Cheongju, South Korea
- Education: Konkuk University (BS, MBA)
- Occupation: Chairman of Celltrion

Korean name
- Hangul: 서정진
- Hanja: 徐廷珍
- RR: Seo Jeongjin
- MR: Sŏ Chŏngjin

Seo Jung-jin (Korean: 서정진; born October 23, 1957) is a South Korean businessman. He is among the richest people in South Korea, with Forbes giving his December 2024 net worth as US$7.2 billion and ranking him the third richest in the country. He is chairman and cofounder of the pharmaceutical company Celltrion.

== Biography ==
He was born in Cheongju, South Korea on October 23, 1957. He graduated from Jemulpo High School. He received Bachelor of Industrial Engineering and Master of Business Administration degrees from Konkuk University.

He began his career at Samsung Electronics. He then worked as a consultant for Daewoo Motors.

In 1999, he founded Nexol (넥솔), a predecessor company to Celltrion, with ten of his colleagues from Daewoo Motors. He retired from the company in March 2021, but returned as chairman in March 2023.

By 2023, he owned 97.2% of Celltrion Holdings, which in turn owned 23% of Celltrion, 55% of Celltrion Pharm, and 24.3% of Celltrion Healthcare.

== Personal life ==
Seo has two sons. His first son, Seo Jin-seok (서진석), is chairman of the board at Celltrion and Celltrion Pharm. His second son, Seo Jun-suk (서준석), is Celltrion Healthcare's chairman of the board. Their 2024 appointments to leadership positions in the company reportedly appeared to contradict a previous statement that he had made in 2019, where he claimed his intent was to have non-family members lead the company.

Seo was in a common-law relationship with a woman from 2001 to 2012. By 2023, she was reportedly CEO of Seorin Holdings and Seowon D&D, affiliates of Celltrion. He had two daughters with this woman, although their relationship became strained and they fell out of contact. He paid child support to this woman; he alleged that she demanded more money from him, and that he filed a police report against her. In 2021, his family register was updated to include these two daughters.

== Awards ==
- 2021: NAEK Award, National Academy of Engineering of Korea
