= Jang Na-ra filmography =

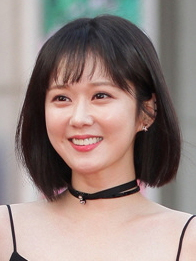
- Jang in 2017
- Film: 7
- Television series: 26
- Television show: 3
- Documentary: 2

Jang Na-ra (Korean: 장나라; born March 18, 1981) is a South Korean singer and actress active in both the South Korean and Chinese entertainment industries since 2001. She starred in well-received television series Successful Story of a Bright Girl (2002), My Love Patzzi (2002), Wedding (2005), My Bratty Princess (2005), Confession Couple (2017) and The Last Empress (2018–2019).

== Film ==
Year	Title		Role	Notes	Ref.
Year	English	Original	Role	Notes	Ref.
2002	Help! I'm a Fish	N/A		voice actor for Korean dubbing	
2003	Oh! Happy Day	오! 해피데이	Kong Hee-ji		
2007	Girl's Revolution	麻雀要革命		Chinese Film	
2009	Sky and Ocean	하늘과 바다	Ha-neul		
2012	Flying With You	一起飞	He Qianqian / Baby	Chinese Film	
2012	Whoever	愛誰誰	Yawen (cameo)	Chinese Film	
2015	Polaroid	폴라로이드		cameo	
2021	The Kindness of Strangers	타인의 친절	Narrator	barrier-free version	

== Television series ==
Year	Title		Role	Notes	Ref.
Year	English	Original	Role	Notes	Ref.
2001	New Nonstop	뉴논스톱	Jang Na-ra	Episode 269 onwards	
2002	Successful Story of a Bright Girl	명랑소녀 성공기	Cha Yang-soon		
2002	My Love Patzzi	내 사랑 팥쥐	Yang Song-yee		
2003	Hello! Balbari	헬로 발바리		Cameo	
2004	Love Is All Around	사랑을 할꺼야	Jin Bo-ra		
2004	Nonstop 4	논스톱4	Jang Na-ra	Cameo (episode 113)	
2004	Silver Love	银色年华	Nara	Chinese drama	
2005	Banjun Drama "I Got Married to a Weird Woman" "My Love Mite" "Reincarnation" "And There Was Nothing" "Strange Village" "The Golden Age of Gas Man"	대결! 반전 드라마			
2005	My Bratty Princess	刁蠻公主	Situ Jing/Xiao Long Xia	Chinese drama	
2005	Wedding	웨딩	Lee Se-na		
2007	Good Morning Shanghai	纯白之恋	You Hao Yun	Chinese drama	
2010	Iron Masked Singer	铁面歌女	Hu Die/Hu Yin Yin	Chinese drama	
2011	Unruly Qiao	刁蛮俏御医	He Tian Xin	Chinese drama	
2011	Baby Faced Beauty	동안미녀	Lee So-young		
2012	Race Course	跑馬場	Matsuno Akiko	Chinese drama	
2012–2013	School 2013	학교 2013	Jung In-jae		
2013	Red Palanquin	红轿子	Qiao Lizhen	Chinese drama	
2014	You Are My Destiny	운명처럼 널 사랑해	Kim Mi-young		
2014	Drama Festival – Old Farewell	오래된 안녕	Han Chae-hee	Cameo	
2014	Mr. Back	미스터 백	Eun Ha-soo		
2015	One-Winged Eagle	单翼雄鹰	Zhang Lanfang	Cameo	
2015	Hello Monster	너를 기억해	Cha Ji-an		
2016	One More Happy Ending	한번 더 해피엔딩	Han Mi-mo		
2017	Go Back	고백부부	Ma Jin-joo		
2018	The Last Empress	황후의 품격	Oh Sunny		
2019	VIP	브이아이피	Na Jung-sun		
2020	Oh My Baby	오마이베이비	Jang Ha-ri		
2021	Sell Your Haunted House	대박부동산	Hong Ji-ah		
2022	Cheer Up	치얼업	Na Jung-sun	Cameo	
2023	Family: The Unbreakable Bond	패밀리	Kang Yoo-ra		
2023–2024	My Happy Ending	나의 해피엔드	Seo Jae-won		
2024	Good Partner	굿파트너	Cha Eun-kyung		
2025	Taxi Driver 3	강주리	Kang Ju-ri	Episode 9–10	

== Documentaries ==
Year	Title		Role	Ref.
Year	English	Original	Role	Ref.
2015	Panda Theater	판다극장	Narrator	
2017	AD 2100 Climate Strikes Back	AD 2100 기후의 반격	Presenter	

== Television shows ==
Year	Title		Role	Ref.
Year	English	Original	Role	Ref.
2001–2002	Music Camp	생방송 음악캠프	Host	
2002	Love Story	러브 스토리	Host	

== Hosting ==
Year	Title	Notes	Ref.
2019	2019 SBS Drama Awards	with Shin Dong-yup	

== Music video appearances ==
Year	Title		Artist	Notes	Ref.
Year	English	Original	Artist	Notes	Ref.
2007	"I Want to Tell You"	好想对你说	Peter Ho	She is also the one singing the duet together with Peter Ho	
2009	"Smilling Goodbye"	웃으며 안녕	Lee Seok-hoon of SG Wannabe		
