= Family: The Unbreakable Bond =

2023 South Korean television series

- Promotional poster
- Hangul: 패밀리
- Lit.: Family
- RR: Paemilli
- MR: P'aemilli
- Genre: Comedy drama; Spy
- Written by: Jeong Yoo-seon
- Directed by: Jang Jeong-do; Lee Jung-mook
- Starring: Jang Hyuk; Jang Na-ra; Chae Jung-an; Kim Nam-hee
- Music by: Choi Seung-kwon; Kim Ji-soo
- Country of origin: South Korea
- Original language: Korean
- No. of episodes: 12

Production
- Executive producer: Kim Sung-min
- Producers: Kim Young-kyu; Kim Je-hyeon; Lee Young-suk
- Running time: 70 minutes
- Production companies: Studio Dragon; IMTV

Original release
- Network: tvN
- Release: April 17 – May 23, 2023

Family: The Unbreakable Bond (Korean: 패밀리) is a 2023 South Korean television series written by Jeong Yoo-seon, co-directed by Jang Jeong-do and Lee Jung-mook, and starring Jang Hyuk, Jang Na-ra, Chae Jung-an, and Kim Nam-hee. It aired on tvN from April 17, to May 23, 2023, every Monday and Tuesday at 20:50 (KST). It is also available for streaming on Disney+ in selected regions.

== Synopsis ==
The series tells the story of Kwon Do-hoon (Jang Hyuk), an NIS black agent husband who disguises himself as an ordinary office worker, and Kang Yoo-ra (Jang Na-ra), a sweet and fierce wife who dreams of a perfect family.

== Cast ==
=== Main ===
- Jang Hyuk as Kwon Do-hoon (43 yo): Kang Yu-ra's husband, who is a black agent of the National Intelligence Service who disguises himself as an employee of a trading company.
- Jang Na-ra as Kang Yu-ra (37 yo): Do-hoon's wife who dreams of a normal yet perfect family.
- Chae Jung-an as Oh Chun-ryun (43 yo): a professional NIS operative who is also Do-hoon's manager in the trading company.
- Kim Nam-hee as Cho Tae-gu (39 yo): a suspicious uninvited guest who visits the families of Do-hoon and Yu-ra.

=== Supporting ===
==== Do-hoon's family ====
- Lee Soon-jae as Kwon Woong-soo (80 yo): Do-hoon's father.
- Shin Soo-ah as Kwon Min-seo (8 yo): Do-hoon and Yu-ra's daughter.
- Kim Kang-min as Kwon Ji-hoon (28 yo): Do-hoon's younger brother.
- Yoon Sang-jeong as Lee Mi-rim (26 yo): Ji-hoon's wife.

==== Do-hoon's colleagues ====
- Lee Joo-won as Lim Jae-yeol (43 yo): Do-hoon's colleague and friend, who is also a black agent.
- Lee Chae-young as Yoon Chae-ri (36 yo): Jae-yeol's ex-wife. She has excellent foreign language skills, as well as skills in information collection and espionage work.
- Gabee as Ma Young-ji (29 yo): Do-hoon's team brain.

=== Others ===
- Bruno Bruni Jr. as Thomas Wolfe
- Lee Mi-sook as Ma Yeon-rim, Butterfly

=== Special appearances ===
- Cha Tae-hyun as Mr Cha, bakery shop owner
- Choo Sung-hoon as Koo In-bo
- Lee Ju-myoung as Shadow
- Choi Young-joon as Musa

== Production ==
The series marked the fourth project together between actor Jang Hyuk and actress Jang Na-ra after Successful Story of a Bright Girl (2002), You Are My Destiny (2014) and MBC Drama Festival: Old Goodbye (2014).

== Original soundtrack ==
=== Part 1 ===
Released on April 18, 2023
No.	Title	Lyrics	Music	Artist	Length
1.	"Danger"	Lee Seon, Sun Hae, ABOUT	ABOUT, KIME, HEMO	H1-KEY	3:01
2.	"Danger - Instrumental"		ABOUT, KIME, HEMO		3:01
Total length:					6:02

=== Part 2 ===
Released on April 25, 2023
No.	Title	Lyrics	Music	Artist	Length
1.	"Timeless"	Sam Woo, Lee Issac, Kim Ji-soo	Lee Issac, Kim Ji-soo	Sam Ock	3:05
2.	"Timeless - Instrumental"		Lee Issac, Kim Ji-soo		3:05
Total length:					6:10

=== Part 3 ===
Released on May 2, 2023
No.	Title	Lyrics	Music	Artist	Length
1.	"Nobody Knows" (아무도 모르게)	Kim Hyun	Park Tae-jin (Bluewall)	Kim Ye-ji	3:28
2.	"Nobody Knows - Instrumental"		Park Te-jin (Bluewall)		3:28
Total length:					6:56

=== Part 4 ===
Released on May 16, 2023
No.	Title	Lyrics	Music	Artist	Length
1.	"Nightmare"	Kim Ji-soo, Kyuri	Kim Ji-soo	Kyuri	3:40
2.	"Nightmare - Instrumental"		Kim Ji-soo		3:40
Total length:					7:20

== Viewership ==
Family: The Unbreakable Bond : South Korea viewers per episode (thousands)

Season	Episode number												Average
Season	1	2	3	4	5	6	7	8	9	10	11	12	Average
1	1013	956	823	674	718	684	690	608	659	690	608	727	738

Source: Audience measurement performed nationwide by Nielsen Korea.

Average TV viewership ratings
Ep.	Original broadcast date	Average audience share (Nielsen Korea)	
Ep.	Original broadcast date	Nationwide	Seoul
1	April 17, 2023	4.875% (1st)	5.786% (1st)
2	April 18, 2023	4.151% (1st)	4.537% (1st)
3	April 24, 2023	3.719% (1st)	4.392% (1st)
4	April 25, 2023	2.971% (2nd)	3.031% (2nd)
5	May 1, 2023	2.884% (1st)	3.203% (1st)
6	May 2, 2023	3.085% (1st)	3.511% (1st)
7	May 8, 2023	3.006% (1st)	3.372% (1st)
8	May 9, 2023	2.940% (1st)	3.195% (2nd)
9	May 15, 2023	3.059% (1st)	3.557% (1st)
10	May 16, 2023	3.076% (2nd)	3.717% (2nd)
11	May 22, 2023	2.888% (1st)	2.949% (1st)
12	May 23, 2023	3.236% (2nd)	3.447% (2nd)
Average		3.324%	3.732%
In the table above, the blue numbers represent the lowest ratings and the red numbers represent the highest ratings.; This series airs on a cable channel/pay TV which normally has a relatively smaller audience compared to free-to-air TV/public broadcasters (KBS, SBS, MBC and EBS).
