= Tomb of the River =

2021 South Korean action film

- Hangul: 강릉
- RR: Gangneung
- MR: Kangnŭng
- Directed by: Yoon Young-bin
- Written by: Yoon Young-bin
- Starring: Yu Oh-seong; Jang Hyuk
- Production companies: Ascendio Entertainment; Bon Factory; Joy N Cinema; DayDream Entertainment
- Distributed by: Ascendio Entertainment; Joy N Cinema; Studio Santa Claus Entertainment
- Release date: November 10, 2021
- Running time: 119 minutes
- Country: South Korea
- Language: Korean
- Box office: est. US$2.68 million

Tomb of the River, also known as Paid in Blood (Korean: 강릉; RR: Gangneung) is a 2021 South Korean neo-noir action thriller film directed by Yoon Young-bin, starring Yu Oh-seong and Jang Hyuk. It was released on November 10, 2021.

== Plot ==
Chairman Oh, the leader of a crime gang, plans to construct the biggest resort in Gangneung, with Kim Gil-seok as his loyal underling. Things turn violent when a new upcoming gangster Lee Min-seok sets his sight on the Gangneung resort, and uses all sorts of deceitful means to acquire it.

== Cast ==
=== Main ===
- Yu Oh-seong as Kim Gil-seok, loyal underling of Chairman Oh
- Jang Hyuk as Lee Min-seok, a ruthless gangster from Seoul
- Park Sung-geun as Cho Bang-hyun, a detective who is also Gil-seok's long time friend
- Oh Dae-hwan as Kim Hyung-geun, Gil-seok's right-hand man

=== Supporting ===
- Lee Hyun-kyun as Lee Chong-seop
- Shin Seung-hwan as Kang Jung-mo, Min-seok's assistant
- Song Young-kyu as President Shin
- Kim Jun-bae as Choi Mu Sang
- Lee Chae-young as Namkoong Eun-seon, Min-seok's partner
- Han Sun-hwa as Han Bo-ram
- Kim Se-joon as Chairman Oh
- Kim Tae-han
- Jo Hyun-shik
- Choi Ki-sub

== Production ==
Principal photography began on October 19, 2020, and filming wrapped up on December 6, 2020.

This marks a reunion between the lead actors Jang Hyuk and Yu Oh-seong after filming the series The Merchant: Gaekju 2015 together in 2015–2016.
