= 2015 KBS Drama Awards =

29th edition of award ceremony

- Date: December 31, 2015
- Hosted by: Jun Hyun-moo; Park Bo-gum; Kim So-hyun
- Official website: 2015 KBS 연기대상

Television coverage
- Network: KBS, KBS World

The 2015 KBS Drama Awards, presented by Korean Broadcasting System (KBS), took place on December 31, 2015 in Yeouido, Seoul. It was hosted by Jun Hyun-moo, Park Bo-gum and Kim So-hyun.

== Winners and nominees ==
(Winners denoted in bold)

Grand Prize (Daesang)	PD Award
**Kim Soo-hyun** – **The Producers**; **Go Doo-shim** – **The Virtual Bride**, **All About My Mom**	**Kim Hye-ja** – **Unkind Ladies**
Top Excellence Award, Actor	Top Excellence Award, Actress
**So Ji-sub** – **Oh My Venus**; Jang Hyuk – The Merchant: Gaekju 2015; Jung Jae-young – Assembly; Kim Sang-joong – The Jingbirok: A Memoir of Imjin War; Kim Soo-hyun – The Producers	**Chae Shi-ra** – **Unkind Ladies**; Go Doo-shim – All About My Mom; Gong Hyo-jin – The Producers; Kim Hye-ja – Unkind Ladies; Shin Min-a – Oh My Venus
Excellence Award, Actor in a Miniseries	Excellence Award, Actress in a Miniseries
**Cha Tae-hyun** – **The Producers**; Joo Sang-wook – Masked Prosecutor; Kim Soo-hyun – The Producers; Seo In-guk – Hello Monster; So Ji-sub – Oh My Venus	**Shin Min-a** – **Oh My Venus**; Bae Jong-ok – Spy; Gong Hyo-jin – The Producers; IU – The Producers; Jang Na-ra – Hello Monster
Excellence Award, Actor in a Mid-length Drama	Excellence Award, Actress in a Mid-length Drama
**Jang Hyuk** – **The Merchant: Gaekju 2015**; Ji Jin-hee – Blood; Jung Jae-young – Assembly; Park Hyuk-kwon – Unkind Ladies; Yu Oh-seong – The Merchant: Gaekju 2015	**Kim Min-jung** – **The Merchant: Gaekju 2015**; Chae Shi-ra – Unkind Ladies; Han Chae-ah – The Merchant: Gaekju 2015; Kim Hye-ja – Unkind Ladies; Song Yun-ah – Assembly
Excellence Award, Actor in a Serial Drama	Excellence Award, Actress in a Serial Drama
**Kim Kap-soo** – **All About My Mom**; **Kim Tae-woo** – **The Jingbirok: A Memoir of Imjin War**; Kim Sang-joong – The Jingbirok: A Memoir of Imjin War; Lee Sang-woo – All About My Mom; Lee Joon-hyuk – House of Bluebird	**Eugene** – **All About My Mom**; Choi Myung-gil – House of Bluebird; Go Doo-shim – All About My Mom; Kyung Soo-jin – House of Bluebird
Excellence Award, Actor in a Daily Drama	Excellence Award, Actress in a Daily Drama
**Im Ho** – **The Stars Are Shining**; **Kwak Si-yang** – **All Is Well**; Ahn Nae-sang – Love on a Rooftop; Jae Hee – Save the Family; Kim Min-soo – In Still Green Days; Sung Hyuk – You Are the Only One	**Han Chae-ah** – **You Are the Only One**; **Kang Byul** – **Save the Family**; Choi Yoon-young – All Is Well; Im Se-mi – Love on a Rooftop; Ko Won-hee – The Stars Are Shining; Song Ha-yoon – In Still Green Days
Excellence Award, Actor in a One-Act/Special/Short Drama	Excellence Award, Actress in a One-Act/Special/Short Drama
**Bong Tae-gyu** – **Drama Special – Trains Don't Stop at Noryangjin Station**; Kim Dae-myung – Drama Special – "Red Moon"; Kim Yeong-cheol – Drama Special – "The Wind Blows to the Hope"; Lee Joon – Drama Special – "What Is The Ghost Doing"; Yu Oh-seong – Drama Special – "The Brothers' Summer"	**Kim Young-ok** – **Snowy Road**; **Lee Ha-na** – **Drama Special – "Fake Family"**; Cho Soo-hyang – Snowy Road, Drama Special – "What Is The Ghost Doing"; Choi Myung-gil – Drama Special – "Contract Man"; Moon Ji-in – Drama Special – "Funny Woman"
Best Supporting Actor	Best Supporting Actress
**Kim Kyu-chul** – **The Jingbirok: A Memoir of Imjin War**, **The Merchant: Gaekju 2015**; **Park Bo-gum** – **Hello Monster**; Choi Il-hwa – Save the Family; Jang Hyun-sung – Assembly; Kim Ji-seok – Unkind Ladies, Cheer Up!; Kim Min-kyo – You Are the Only One; Oh Min-suk – All About My Mom	**Kim Seo-hyung** – **Assembly**; **Uhm Hyun-kyung** – **House of Bluebird**. **All Is Well**; Jo Eun-sook – Love on a Rooftop, The Stars Are Shining; Kim Hye-eun – The Jingbirok: A Memoir of Imjin War, Unkind Ladies; Lee Mi-do – Unkind Ladies, Cheer Up!; Seo Yi-sook – Unkind Ladies; Son Yeo-eun – All About My Mom
Best New Actor	Best New Actress
**Yeo Jin-goo** – **Orange Marmalade**; Choi Tae-joon – All About My Mom; Lee Won-keun – Cheer Up!; Nam Joo-hyuk – Who Are You: School 2015; Song Jae-rim – Unkind Ladies; Yook Sung-jae – Who Are You: School 2015	**Chae Soo-bin** – **Cheer Up!**, **House of Bluebird**; **Kim So-hyun** – **Who Are You: School 2015**; Cho Soo-hyang – Who Are You: School 2015; Jo Bo-ah- All About My Mom; Kim Seol-hyun – Orange Marmalade; Jo Yun-seo – Love on a Rooftop
Best Young Actor	Best Young Actress
**Choi Kwon-soo** – **Drama Special – "The Brothers' Summer"**; Chae Sang-woo – Unkind Ladies; Gil Jung-woo – All About My Mom; Jo Hyun-do – The Merchant: Gaekju 2015; Seo Young-joo – Snowy Road	**Kim Hyang-gi** – **Snowy Road**; Jang Seo-hee – The Stars Are Shining; Kim Ji-min – Assembly; Kim Sae-ron – Snowy Road; Kim Yoo-bin – The Stars Are Shining
Netizen Award, Actor	Netizen Award, Actress
**Kim Soo-hyun** – **The Producers**	**Kim So-hyun** – **Who Are You: School 2015**
Popularity Award, Actor	Popularity Award, Actress
**Park Bo-gum** – **Hello Monster**; **Nam Joo-hyuk** – **Who Are You: School 2015**	**Kim Seol-hyun** – **Orange Marmalade**; **Jo Bo-ah**- **All About My Mom**
Best Couple Award	Best Writer
**Jang Hyuk** and **Han Chae-ah** – **The Merchant: Gaekju 2015**; **Kim Soo-hyun** and **Gong Hyo-jin** and **Cha Tae-hyun** – **The Producers**; **So Ji-sub** and **Shin Min-a** – **Oh My Venus**; **Yook Sung-jae** and **Kim So-hyun** – **Who Are You: School 2015**	**Kim In-young** – **Unkind Ladies**

== Presenters ==
Order	Presenter	Award
1	Kwak Dong-yeon, Hong Hwa-ri	Best Young Actor/Actress
2	Cho Dal-hwan, Kim So-hyun	Best Short Drama Actor/Actress
3	Shin Sung-rok	Best Supporting Actor/Actress
4	Kim Min-soo (actor), Lee Jae-joon	Popularity Award
5	Seo In-guk, Kim Seul-gi	Best New Actor/Actress
6	Sam Okyere, Kan Mi-youn	Netizen Award
7	Hong Chang-wook, Kim Ji-seok (actor)	PD Award
8	Shin Hyun-joon, Seo Yea-ji	Best Actor/Actress in a Mid-Length Drama
9	Cho Ui-seok, Chae Shi-ra	Best Writer
10	Song Il-kook (as Jang Yeong-sil)	Top Excellence Actor/Actress
