= National Bang Bang Cook Cook =

South Korean television show

- Promotional Poster
- Hangul: 전국방방쿡쿡
- RR: Jeonguk bangbangkukkuk
- MR: Chŏn'guk pangbangk'ukk'uk
- Genre: Reality
- Written by: Ji Hyun-sook; Park Min-jung; Kang Hye-rim; Ahn Ji-hye; Go Ah-ra; Joo Ha-neul; Jung Hye-in; Joo Soo-yeon
- Directed by: Kim Sung; Yeom Gyu-bon; Lee Ji-hye; Kim Ji-hwan; Kim Min-jong; Park Jung-woo; Jung Woo-young; Kim Dong-neok; Yoo Jae-hyun
- Starring: Cha Tae-hyun; Jang Hyuk; Lee Sang-yeob; Ahn Jung-hwan; Hyun Joo-yup; Kim Tae-kyun; Park Tae-hwan
- Country of origin: South Korea
- Original language: Korean
- No. of seasons: 1
- No. of episodes: 12

Production
- Producer: Kim Sung
- Production location: South Korea
- Running time: 100 minutes

Original release
- Network: MBN
- Release: April 10 – June 26, 2021

National Bang Bang Cook Cook (Korean: 전국방방쿡쿡) is a South Korea reality show program on MBN starring Cha Tae-hyun, Jang Hyuk, Lee Sang-yeob, Ahn Jung-hwan, Hyun Joo-yup, Kim Tae-kyun, Park Tae-hwan. The show aired on MBN every Saturday at 18:00 (KST) from April 10, 2021 to June 26, 2021.

== Synopsis ==
This show is an outdoor cooking competition where the cast members will compete among their teams. Each week they will be given a different theme to serve the guests.

== Fixed Cast ==
Team	Name	Episode(s)
Actor	Cha Tae-hyun	1-12
Actor	Jang Hyuk	1-12
Actor	Lee Sang-yeob	1-12
Athlete	Ahn Jung-hwan	1-12
Athlete	Kim Tae-kyun	1-12
Athlete	Park Tae-hwan	1-3
Athlete	Hyun Joo-yup	4-12

== Guests ==
Name	Episode(s)	Ref.
Kim Soo-mi	1	
Baek Ji-young, Gummy	2	
Kim Byung-ji, Lee Young-pyo, Cho Won-hee	3	
Choi Soo-jong, Ha Hee-ra	4	
Park Joon-hyung, Hwang Chi-yeul	5	
Kim Joon-ho, Kim Dae-hee	6	
Jin Sung, Na Tae-joo, Kim Soo-chan	7	
Jang Kwang, Kim Kang-hyun, Ji Sang-ryeol	8	
Jin Hae-sung, Song So-hee, Oh Yu-jin	9	
Yoo In-young, Jeong Yu-mi, On Joo-wan	10	
Do Kyung-wan, Oh Sang-jin, Kim Hwan	11	
Hur Jae, Hong Sung-heon, Park Tae-hwan	12	

== Ratings ==
- Ratings listed below are the individual corner ratings of National Bang Bang Cook Cook. (Note: Individual corner ratings do not include commercial time, which regular ratings include.)
- In the ratings below, the highest rating for the show will be in red and the lowest rating for the show will be in blue each year.

Ep. #	Original Airdate	Nielsen Korea Rating Nationwide
1	April 10, 2021	0.8%
2	April 17, 2021	0.8%
3	April 24, 2021	1.2%
4	May 1, 2021	1.2%
5	May 8, 2021	0.8%
6	May 15, 2021	1.3%
7	May 22, 2021	1.1%
8	May 29, 2021	1.0%
9	Jun 05, 2021	1.0%
10	Jun 12, 2021	1.0%
11	Jun 19, 2021	1.0%
12	Jun 26, 2021	1.2%
