= Part-Time Spy =

- Theatrical poster
- Hangul: 비정규직 특수요원
- Hanja: 非正規職 特殊要員
- RR: Bijeonggyujik teuksuyowon
- MR: Pijŏnggyujik t'ŭksuyowŏn
- Directed by: Kim Deok-su
- Written by: Kim Deok-su
- Starring: Kang Ye-won; Han Chae-ah
- Production company: Storm Pictures Korea
- Distributed by: Storm Pictures Korea; ISU C&E
- Release date: March 16, 2017
- Running time: 117 minutes
- Country: South Korea
- Language: Korean
- Box office: US$1 million

Part-Time Spy (Korean: 비정규직 특수요원; lit. 'Temporary Special Forces') is a 2017 South Korean action comedy film starring Kang Ye-won and Han Chae-ah. It was released on March 16, 2017.

== Premise ==
A former national security agency contract worker works with an undercover policewoman to recover stolen money from a voice phishing syndicate.

== Cast ==
- Kang Ye-won as Jang Young-shil
- Han Chae-ah as Na Jung-an
- Namkoong Min as Min-seok
- Jo Jae-yoon as Deputy Department Head Park
- Kwak Ja-hyeong as Chief Financial Officer
- Kim Min-kyo as Department Head Yang
- Shin Se-hwi as Lee Ji-eun
- Kim Sung-eun as Eun-jung
- Lee Jung-min as Song-yi
- Nam Seong-jin as Chief Goo
- Dong Hyun-bae as Jae-yong
- Ryoo Seong-hyeon as City Hall Section Chief

== Reception ==
The film opened fourth on the South Korean weekend box office chart, with 115,000 entries and a gross of US$805,000.
