= Beijing Huajia University =

Coordinates: 39.935071°N 116.734196°E

- Simplified Chinese: 北京华嘉学院
Transcriptions
Standard Mandarin
- Hanyu Pinyin: Běijīng Huájiā Xuéyuàn

Former name
- Simplified Chinese: 北京中山学院
Transcriptions
Standard Mandarin
- Hanyu Pinyin: Běijīng Zhōngshān Xuéyuàn

Beijing Huajia University is a university in Huairou District, Beijing, founded in 1985 as Beijing Zhongshan University by the Revolutionary Committee of the Chinese Kuomintang. In June 2010, they named Korean actress Jang Na-ra as an associate professor.
