= Jo Yun-seo =

South Korean actress (born 1993)

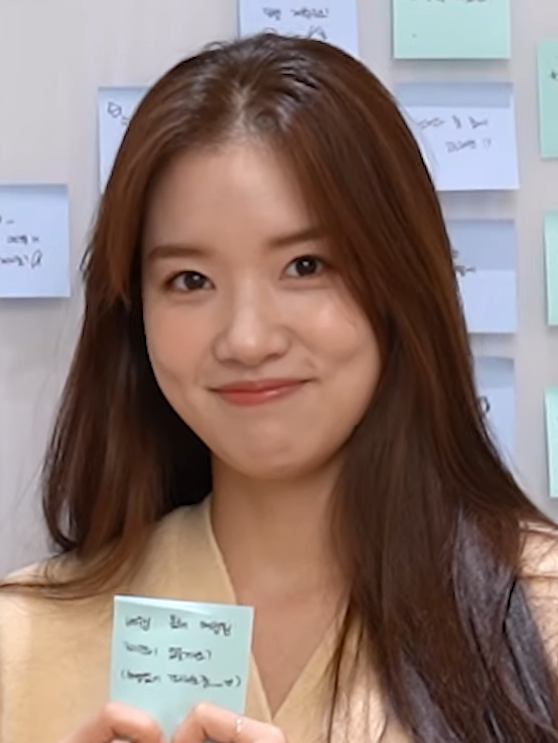
- Jo in February 2023
- Born: January 4, 1993 (age 33); South Korea
- Other name: Jo Yoon-seo
- Education: Dongguk University (Department of Theatre)
- Occupation: Actress
- Years active: 2012–present
- Agent: NKM Film (Note: An entertainment company founded in 2015 by Namkoong Min.)

Korean name
- Hangul: 조윤서
- Hanja: 曺尹序
- RR: Jo Yunseo
- MR: Cho Yunsŏ

Jo Yun-seo (Korean: 조윤서; born January 4, 1993) is a South Korean actress.

== Filmography ==
=== Film ===
Year	Title	Role	Notes	Ref.
2007	Off Road	Mi-jung		
2014	Lock&Lock Astrology		short film	
2017	The Way	Sang-bum's granddaughter		
2022	In Our Prime	Park Bo-ram		
2022	The Night Owl	Crown Princess Minhoe		
2024	In the Realm of Ripley	Si-hyuk's mother		
2026	Samakdo: Three Evil Islands	Chae So-yeon	CJ CGV exclusive movie	

=== Television series ===
Year	Title	Role
2012	The Birth of a Family	Ma Ye-ri (young)
2013	Dating Agency: Cyrano	Min Se-kyung (ep. 3–5)
2013	Reply 1994	Cha Ae-jung (ep. 18–19)
2014	Jang Bo-ri Is Here!	Jo Soo-yeon (guest)
2014	Tears of Heaven	Jin Je-in
2015	Love on a Rooftop	Yoon Seung-ah
2016	Mystery Freshman	Hye-jung
2016	Entertainer	Lee Ji-young
2016	Happiness Giver	Lee So-jung / Im Eun-ah
2018	Grand Prince	Jung Seol-hwa
2021	Mine	Secretary Oh Soo-Young
2023–2024	Welcome to Samdal-ri	Bang Eun-ju
2026	Love Phobia	Seol Jae-hee
2026	The Husband	Cha Myung-hee

== Awards and nominations ==
Name of the award ceremony, year presented, category, nominee of the award, and the result of the nomination
Award ceremony	Year	Category	Nominee / Work	Result	Ref.
Grand Bell Awards	2022	Best New Actress	In Our Prime	Nominated	
Grand Bell Awards	2022	New Wave Award	In Our Prime	Won	
KBS Drama Awards	2015	Best New Actress	Love on a Rooftop	Nominated	
