= Jang Hyuk =

South Korean actor (born 1976)

- Jang in 2017
- Born: Jung Yong-jun; December 20, 1976 (age 49); Busan, South Korea
- Education: Seoul Institute of the Arts – Film; Dankook University – Theater and Film
- Occupations: Actor; rapper
- Years active: 1997–present
- Agent: SidusHQ
- Spouse: Kim Yeo-jin (m. 2008)
- Children: 3

Korean name
- Hangul: 정용준
- Hanja: 鄭鏞浚
- RR: Jeong Yongjun
- MR: Chŏng Yongjun

Stage name
- Hangul: 장혁
- Hanja: 張赫
- RR: Jang Hyeok
- MR: Chang Hyŏk

Jung Yong-jun (Korean: 정용준; born December 20, 1976), better known as Jang Hyuk, is a South Korean actor. He is best known for his leading roles in the films Volcano High (2001), Windstruck (2004), The Flu (2013), as well as the television series Successful Story of a Bright Girl (2002), Thank You (2007), The Slave Hunters (2010), Deep Rooted Tree (2011), You Are My Destiny (2014), Voice (2017), Money Flower (2017–18), and Bloody Heart (2022).

== Career ==
=== 1997–2001: Beginnings and rise to fame ===
Jang Yong-jun spent most of his childhood and adolescence in his birthplace, Busan. In 1996, Jeong Hoon-tak, who ran a management company named EBM Production Co., after success elevated Jung Woo-sung and Kim Ji-ho as top star, met Jeong Yong-jun, a 20-year-old young man who was a student at Seoul Institute of the Arts. He was convinced that the innocence in the face of Jung Yong-joon, which exudes sadness and strange charisma would become a "weapon". Jung Hoon-tak pushed Jung Yong-joon into the accommodation of the group god members who were still preparing for their debut. And started the harsh training. With Jung, who has his own confidence that "only those who are prepared can succeed," Jung Yong-joon prepared for a long time.

After Lee Seung-hwan's music video, Jung Yong-joon making his acting debut in 1997 in the television drama Model under his stage name Jang hyuk. Besides the teen series School (1999) and a minor role in the little-seen film Zzang (The Best), Jang appeared in the music video of "To Mother", the 1999 debut single of popular boyband g.o.d, whom he was housemates with at that time. Also in 1999, he played the good-hearted yet aggressive Myung-ha in the series Into the Sunlight. Using the stage name "TJ", he had a brief career as a rapper and acted in several music videos from his rap album TJ Project, which was released in 2000.

Jang's career first began to take off in 2001, when he was cast in the lead role of the special-effects extravaganza Volcano High with actress Shin Min-a. His acting in the eccentric role drew praise from fans and critics.

=== 2002–2004: Mainstream popularity and controversy ===
In 2002 he continued to make a name for himself, starring in the sleeper hit Jungle Juice, which made the top of the weekly box-office. His popularity continued to increase when he starred in the hugely popular TV drama Successful Story of a Bright Girl with actress Jang Na-ra. He also took a role in Public Toilet, the HK-Korea co-production by acclaimed Hong Kong director Fruit Chan which won a Special Mention in the Upstream section of the 2002 Venice Film Festival.

Jang continued to appear in high-profile projects; in 2003, Jang starred alongside Lee Na-young in the comedy Please Teach Me English, by director Kim Sung-su and the following year, he starred opposite Jun Ji-hyun in Kwak Jae-yong's Windstruck. Although Windstruck was generally not well received in Korea, it went on to beat Shiri and become one of the best-selling Korean films in Japan.

In late 2004, together with fellow actors Song Seung-heon and Han Jae-suk, Jang was found to have illegally avoided his mandatory military service through his and Han's agency SidusHQ. Amid widespread public condemnation, Jang apologized to his fans, then began to serve his two-year military term.

=== 2006–2009: Career revival and international collaborations ===
After his discharge from the military in 2006, Jang made his comeback in the drama series Thank You. A heartwarming story about a young single mother (played by Gong Hyo-jin) with an HIV-positive daughter and the cynical doctor who enters their lives, Thank You surprisingly became a modest hit, and with it Jang left the stigma of his draft-dodging scandal behind him.

He then signed up for the international movie production Dance of the Dragon (2008), a love story that mixed ballroom dancing with martial arts action and costarred Singaporean actress Fann Wong. He won the Best Actor award at the inaugural West Hollywood International Film Festival for his role. Jang also made a cameo in Japanese drama Ryokiteki na Kanojo, a remake of the 2001 Korean film My Sassy Girl. After his earlier guesting on star Tsuyoshi Kusanagi's talk show, the director of the drama reportedly added new scenes for Jang that were not included in the original script. Jang then appeared as the love interest in three music videos of Taiwanese singer Elva Hsiao.

More leading roles in TV dramas followed, including Robber (2008) and Tazza (2008) adapted from the gambling manhwa. In 2009, he appeared in the short film His Concern in the omnibus Five Senses of Eros, the risque thriller Searching for the Elephant, and the melodrama Maybe.

=== 2010–2013: Critical acclaim and continued success ===
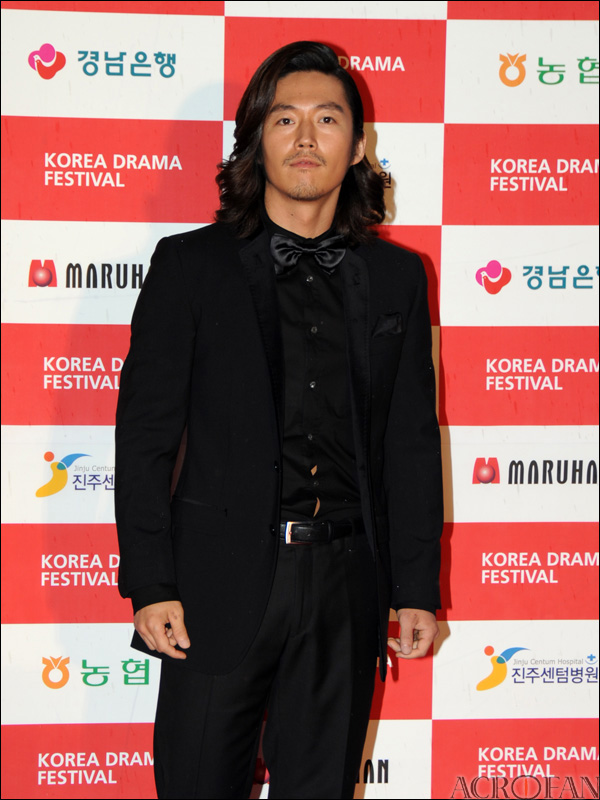
Jang in 2010

In 2010, he received the best reviews of his career for his leading role as the slave hunter ("chuno") Dae-gil in the hit fusion period drama The Slave Hunters. His acting coach of 14 years described Jang as being relentless in his analysis of a character. According to Jang, "It is easy to fail if you don't understand the steps one has to take to be famous." He won several acting awards, most significantly the Grand Prize ("Daesang") at the KBS Drama Awards, and a Best Actor nomination at the 2011 International Emmy Awards.

In the same year, he starred in Fall in Love with Anchor Beauty, the Chinese remake of 2000 Korean drama All About Eve. Fall in Love with Anchor Beauty received high ratings in China during its run.

Back in Korea, Jang played a fund manager-turned-lawyer in 2011's Midas, also starring Lee Min-jung and Kim Hee-ae. He next starred in legal thriller The Client (2011) with Ha Jung-woo and Park Hee-soon, saying the film satisfied his wish to portray a more emotionally complex persona. Playing a man accused of murdering his wife, Jang said he had to find "the right balance" "as someone who can appear at times like a criminal or at other times like an innocent man."

Initially reluctant to sign on to period drama Deep Rooted Tree (2011) because he found the role of low-level royal guard Kang Chae-yoon uninteresting in the original novel, Jang changed his mind upon reading that the character had been dramatized and made richer in the TV script. It tells the story of Kang investigating a case involving the serial murders of Jiphyeonjeon scholars in Gyeongbokgung while King Sejong (played by Han Suk-kyu) is developing the Korean alphabet.

In 2013, he headlined Iris II, the sequel to the 2009 spy action series. This was his third acting collaboration with actress Lee Da-hae, after Robber and The Slave Hunters. He also returned to the big screen in 2013 blockbuster disaster film The Flu, in which he and Soo Ae played a firefighter and a doctor racing against time to find the cure for a deadly strain of the cold virus.

To the surprise of many given his past draft-dodging scandal, he then joined Real Men, a weekly show in which six male celebrities are filmed documentary-style as they enter army boot camp. This was Jang's first regular appearance on a variety/reality show in his 17-year acting career. He said, "I'd like to use this opportunity to reflect on myself through Real Men and to experience army life again." He appeared on Real Men from June 2013 to February 2014. He then wrote a collection of essays on his life experiences titled Jang Hyuk, Hot-Blooded Man, published on August 6, 2013.

=== 2014–present ===
In 2014, he reunited with Volcano High director Kim Tae-kyun in Innocent Thing, a thriller about a high school girl who becomes obsessed with her married gym teacher. He also teamed up again with Successful Story of a Bright Girl costar Jang Na-ra in You Are My Destiny, a Korean remake of the similarly titled 2008 Taiwanese drama. Shortly after, he and Jang starred together for the third time in Old Farewell, about a boxer who travels into the past and re-encounters his recently deceased wife. It was part of the single-episode anthology Drama Festival, and helmed by one of their directors on Fated.

In 2015, Jang returned to the milieu of period dramas with Shine or Go Crazy, a fictional romance between a cursed Goryeo prince and the last princess of Balhae. The film Empire of Lust followed, in which he played the wily and ambitious Yi Bang-won who launched a coup to become the king of Joseon. He was next cast in the Chinese film Inside or Outside, a detective mystery co-starring Simon Yam and Wallace Huo. Jang then played a Joseon innkeeper merchant in The Merchant: Gaekju 2015.

In 2016, Jang was cast in the Chinese drama New Sea. Back in Korea, Jang starred in KBS's medical drama A Beautiful Mind, playing a genius neurosurgeon. Though the drama was critically praised, the number of episodes were brought down from 16 to 14 because of low viewer ratings.

In 2017, he starred in his first cable drama, crime thriller Voice by OCN, where he played an ex-detective who joined a call center's team to track his wife's killer. Voice became a hit and its ratings broke OCN's dramas records when it was aired in Korea. His movie Ordinary Person opposite Son Hyun-joo was released in March 2017, where he acted as a manipulative National Planning Security chief. He also starred in weekend drama Money Flower, earning much acclaim and a Baeksang Arts Awards Best Actor nomination for his role as a revenge-seeking lawyer. The same year, he was cast in action film The Swordsman.

In 2018, Jang returned to the small screen with SBS' romantic comedy drama Wok of Love, playing a former gangster turned restaurant owner; and MBC's action melodrama Bad Papa, playing a former champion boxer who chose to become a bad man in order to become a good father.

In 2019, he took part in reality TV program Urban Cops where celebrities team up with real life cops to solve crimes in the city. The same year, he was cast in the historical drama My Country: The New Age, playing the role of Yi Bang-won.

In 2020, Jang acted as a genius profiler in OCN drama Tell Me What You Saw. His movie The Swordsman was released in September 2020. The same year, he took part in reality TV program Yacht Expedition: The Beginning.

In 2021, Jang took part in outdoor survival variety TV program Law of the Jungle-Pioneers and cooking show National Bang Bang Cook Cook. His noir movie Tomb of the River was released in November 2021.

In 2022, Jang returned to the small screen with KBS2's historical drama Bloody Heart, playing the first vice-premier and a living symbol of power and a figure that everyone obeys. His movie The Killer: A Girl Who Deserves to Die made its world premiere at the Udine Far East Film Festival in April 2022, held a red carpet premiere at Los Angeles in June 2022 and hit the big screens simultaneously in South Korea and North America on July 13, 2022. He also won the Daniel A. Craft award for Excellence in Action Cinema at the 21st New York Asian Film Festival. In November 2022, he took part as a judge in tvN's variety program Super Action.

In March 2023, Jang decided not to renew his contract with Sidus HQ after working with the agency for 26 years since his debut. In April, he returned to the small screen with tvN's drama Family: The Unbreakable Bond. In August, he took part in reality TV travel program Express Delivery: Mongolia Edition.

In August 2024, Jang's interactive film In the Realm of Ripley made its world premiere at the 81st Venice Film Festival.

In January 2025, it was announced that Jang will make his directional debut with action film 'Stop Stop Dark Cold', in a partnership with a Hollywood-based production team. In February 2025, Jang's reality TV program Language Training Before It's Too Late: Shala Shala in Cambridge was aired. He also took part as a cast member in music entertainment show Handsome Trot.

In 2026, he was cast in the historical drama Sword & Silence, a production of KBS. He plays Yeon Gaesomun, the god of war and a ruthless dictator born by Goguryeo.

== Ambassadorship ==
In December 2018, Jang was appointed as an honorary police sergeant by the Korean National Police Agency for capturing the police's activities through movies and dramas.

In August 2025, Jang was appointed as an honorary ambassador for 'World Horse Day', which was proposed by the Mongolian president at the 79th United Nations General Assembly and jointly sponsored by 56 countries, including the Republic of Korea.

== Personal life ==
Jang began dating his girlfriend, Kim Yeo-jin, in 2002. They met at a fitness club, where Kim was his Pilates instructor. The couple's marriage was registered in January 2008, and the ceremony was held in June. His close friends, singer Kim Jong-kook and actor Cha Tae-hyun, participated in the wedding ceremony. The couple have two sons and a daughter, born in February 2008, November 2009 and April 2015 respectively.

Jang has practiced Jeet Kune Do for more than 10 years and is a former professional Taekwondo athlete. He also holds a professional boxer certificate.

== Filmography ==
=== Film ===
Year	Title	Role	Notes	Ref.
1998	Zzang	Im Se-bin		
2001	Volcano High	Kim Kyung-soo		
2002	Jungle Juice	Ki-tae		
2002	Public Toilet	Kim Seon-bak		
2003	Please Teach Me English	Park Moon-soo		
2004	Windstruck	Go Myung-woo		
2004	S Diary	Im Chan	Cameo	
2008	Dance of the Dragon	Kwon Tae-san	Korea-Singapore-USA collaboration	
2009	Five Senses of Eros	Jung Min-soo	Segment: "His Concern"	
2009	Rabbit and Lizard	Eun-seol		
2009	Searching for the Elephant	Hyun-woo		
2011	The Client	Han Cheol-min		
2013	The Flu	Kang Ji-goo		
2014	Innocent Thing	Kim Joon-ki		
2015	Empire of Lust	Prince Yi Bang-won		
2016	Inside or Outside	Woo-geom (Ou Jian)	Korea-China collaboration	
2017	Because I Love You	Fortune teller	Cameo	
2017	Ordinary Person	Choi Gyu-nam		
2020	The Swordsman	Tae-yul		
2021	Tomb of the River	Lee Min-seok		
2022	The Killer: A Girl Who Deserves to Die	Bang Ui-gang		
2024	In the Realm of Ripley	Detective Park	Interactive film	

=== Television series ===
Year	Title	Role	Notes	Ref.
1997	Model	Joon-ho		
1999	School 1	Kang Woo-hyuk		
1999	Into the Sunlight	Han Myung-ha		
2000	Wang Rung's Land	Bong-pil		
2002	Successful Story of a Bright Girl	Han Gi-tae		
2002	The Great Ambition	Park Jae-young		
2007	Thank You	Min Gi-seo		
2008	Robber	Kwon Oh-joon		
2008	Ryokiteki na Kanojo	Jang Hyuk	Japanese drama; cameo, ep.1	
2008	Tazza	Kim Go-ni		
2010	The Slave Hunters	Lee Dae-gil		
2010	Fall in Love with Anchor Beauty	Chen Yi Po	Chinese drama	
2011	Midas	Kim Do-hyun		
2011	Deep Rooted Tree	Kang Chae-yoon / Ddol-bok		
2013	Iris II: New Generation	Jung Yoo-gun		
2014	You Are My Destiny	Lee Gun		
2014	Old Farewell	Kang Soo-hyuk		
2015	Shine or Go Crazy	Wang So		
2015	The Producers	Jang Hyun-sung	Cameo, ep.3	
2015	The Merchant: Gaekju 2015	Chun Bong-sam		
2016	A Beautiful Mind	Lee Young-oh		
2017	Voice	Mu Jin-hyuk	Season 1	
2017	Hit the Top	Passerby	Cameo, ep.2	
2017–2018	Money Flower	Kang Pil-joo / Jang Eun-cheon		
2018	Wok of Love	Doo Chil-sung		
2018	Bad Papa	Yoo Ji-cheol		
2019	The Crowned Clown	King Seonjo	Cameo, ep.1	
2019	My Country: The New Age	Yi Bang-won		
2020	Tell Me What You Saw	Oh Hyun-jae		
2022	Bloody Heart	Park Gye-won		
2023	Family: The Unbreakable Bond	Kwon Do-hoon		
2026	Sword & Silence	Yeon Gaesomun		

=== Web series ===
Year	Title	Role	Notes	Ref.
2014	Love Cells		Cameo	

=== Television shows ===
Year	Title	Role	Notes	Ref.
2013–2014	Real Men	Cast member	Season 1	
2015	Ding Ge Long Dong Qiang	Chuanju member		
2015	The Friends in Croatia	Main cast		
2017	Dragon's Club: Overgrown Bromance	Main cast		
2019	Urban Cops	Main cast	Season 1	
2020	Yacht Expedition: The Beginning	Main cast		
2021	Law of the Jungle - Pioneers	Main cast		
2021	National Bang Bang Cook Cook	Main cast		
2022	Super Action	Judge		
2023	Express Delivery Mongolia Edition	Main Cast		
2025	Language Training Before It's Too Late: Shala Shala in Cambridge	Main Cast		
2025	Handsome Trot	Cast Member		
2025	Park-Jang-Dae-So	Main Cast		

=== Music video appearances ===
Year	Title	Artist	Ref.
1997	"Will You Understand" (이해할께)	Cho Kyu Man	
1997	"A Request" (애원)	Lee Seung-hwan	
1999	"To Mother" (어머님께)	g.o.d	
2000	"God Bless TJ"	TJ Project	
2000	"Money"	TJ Project	
2000	"TJ's Love Story"	TJ Project	
2000	"Take the Life of You"	TJ Project	
2000	"Rain"	TJ Project	
2000	"Hey Girl"	TJ Project	
2000	"Love of Sun and Moon"	TJ Project	
2001	"A Better Day"	jtL	
2006	"Just Go With The Flow" (그저 흐르는 대로)	UTO	
2008	"Impulse" (衝動)	Elva Hsiao	
2008	"The Loneliness of Two People"	Elva Hsiao	
2008	"Is There Love?" (사랑이 있을까)	Kim Yong-jin	
2017	"Hot Sugar" (뜨거운 설탕)	Turbo	

== Discography ==
=== Studio albums ===
List of studio albums, with selected details, chart positions, and sales
Title	Album details	Peak chart positions	Sales
Title	Album details	KOR	Sales
T.J Project	Released: August 7, 2000; Label: LOEN Entertainment; Formats: CD, cassette; Track listing: 1. God Bless TJ (feat. g.o.d); 2. Hey Girl; 3. Take the Life of You; 4. Devil's Heart; 5. 비(햇살 눈부신 날의 비); 6. 돈(Money); 7. The Message; 8. 니 소원이 내 손안에 있어; 9. 일월지애(上); 10. 일월지애(下); 11. 나쁜 습관; 12. 혁이의 사랑이야기; 13. 아침의 향기; 14. Since 1976; 15. 바이러스	6	KOR: 105,183
"—" denotes releases that did not chart or were not released in that region.

=== Soundtrack appearances ===
Year	Title	Album	Ref.
2023	"And, Go On" (그리고, 여행은 계속된다)	Express Delivery: Mongolia Edition OST	

== Bibliography ==
Year	Title	Publisher	ISBN	Ref.
2013	Jang Hyuk, Hot-Blooded Man	Paper Book	ISBN 9788997148325	

== Accolades ==
=== Awards and nominations ===
Name of the award ceremony, year presented, category, nominee of the award, and the result of the nomination
Award ceremony	Year	Category	Nominee / Work	Result	Ref.
A-Awards (Note: Organized by Audi Korea and Arena Homme.)	2010	Passion Award	Jang Hyuk	Won	
APAN Star Awards	2014	Top Excellence Award, Actor in a Miniseries	You Are My Destiny	Nominated	
APAN Star Awards	2015	Top Excellence Award, Actor in a Serial Drama	Shine or Go Crazy / The Merchant: Gaekju 2015	Nominated	
APAN Star Awards	2018	Top Excellence Award, Actor in a Serial Drama	Money Flower	Nominated	
Asia Model Awards	2008	BBF Popular Star Award	Jang Hyuk	Won	
Baeksang Arts Awards	2010	Best Actor – Television	The Slave Hunters	Nominated	
Baeksang Arts Awards	2018	Best Actor – Television	Money Flower	Nominated	
Chinese Martial Arts Festival	2007	New Artist Award	Jang Hyuk	Won	
Chungbuk International Martial Arts and Action Film Festival	2021	Actor Award	The Swordsman	Won	
Grimae Awards	2010	Best Actor	The Slave Hunters	Won	
Grimae Awards	2018	Best Actor	Bad Papa	Won	
Herald Donga Lifestyle Awards	2014	Best Dressed of the Year	Jang Hyuk	Won	
International Emmy Awards	2011	Best Actor	The Slave Hunters	Nominated	
Jewelry Awards	2010	Ruby Award	Jang Hyuk	Won	
KBS Drama Awards	1999	Best New Actor	School 1	Nominated	
KBS Drama Awards	1999	Most Popular Actor	School 1	Nominated	
KBS Drama Awards	2010	Best Couple Award	Jang Hyuk (with Lee Da-hae); The Slave Hunters	Won	
KBS Drama Awards	2010	Grand Prize (Daesang)	The Slave Hunters	Won	
KBS Drama Awards	2010	Top Excellence Award, Actor	The Slave Hunters	Nominated	
KBS Drama Awards	2013	Excellence Award, Actor in a Mid-length Drama	Iris II	Nominated	
KBS Drama Awards	2013	Top Excellence Award, Actor	Iris II	Nominated	
KBS Drama Awards	2015	Best Couple Award	Jang Hyuk (with Han Chae-ah); The Merchant: Gaekju 2015	Won	
KBS Drama Awards	2015	Excellence Award, Actor in a Mid-length Drama	The Merchant: Gaekju 2015	Won	
KBS Drama Awards	2015	Top Excellence Award, Actor	The Merchant: Gaekju 2015	Nominated	
KBS Drama Awards	2015	Grand Prize (Daesang)	The Merchant: Gaekju 2015	Nominated	
KBS Drama Awards	2016	Excellence Award, Actor in a Miniseries	A Beautiful Mind	Nominated	
Korea Drama Awards	2010	Best Actor	The Slave Hunters	Won	
Korea PD Awards	2011	Best Performer, TV Actor category	The Slave Hunters	Won	
Korea World Youth Film Festival	2013	Favorite Actor	Iris II	Won	
Korean Film Shining Star Awards	2017	Drama Star Award	Voice	Won	
MBC Drama Awards	1999	Best New Actor	Into the Sunlight	Nominated	
MBC Drama Awards	2007	Golden Acting Award, Actor in a Miniseries	Thank You	Won	
MBC Drama Awards	2007	Excellence Award, Actor	Thank You	Nominated	
MBC Drama Awards	2014	Best Couple Award	Jang Hyuk (with Jang Na-ra); You Are My Destiny	Won	
MBC Drama Awards	2014	Top Excellence Award, Actor in a Miniseries	You Are My Destiny	Won	
MBC Drama Awards	2014	Best Actor in a Drama Short	Old Farewell	Nominated	
MBC Drama Awards	2015	Top Excellence Award, Actor in a Special Project Drama	Shine or Go Crazy	Nominated	
MBC Drama Awards	2017	Top Excellence Award, Actor in a Weekend Drama	Money Flower	Won	
MBC Drama Awards	2017	Grand Prize (Daesang)	Money Flower	Nominated	
MBC Drama Awards	2018	Vocal King Award	Bad Papa	Won	
MBC Drama Awards	2018	Top Excellence Award, Actor in a Monday-Tuesday Drama	Bad Papa	Nominated	
MBC Entertainment Awards	2013	Popularity Award in a Variety Show	Real Men	Won	
New York Asian Film Festival	2022	Daniel A. Craft Award for Excellence in Action Cinema	The Swordsman / The Killer: A Girl Who Deserves to Die	Won	
SBS Drama Awards	2000	Best New Actor	Wang Rung's Land	Won	
SBS Drama Awards	2002	Top 10 Stars	Successful Story of a Bright Girl / Daemang	Won	
SBS Drama Awards	2002	Top Excellence Award, Actor	Successful Story of a Bright Girl / Daemang	Won	
SBS Drama Awards	2002	Excellence Award, Actor in a Miniseries	Successful Story of a Bright Girl	Nominated	
SBS Drama Awards	2002	Excellence Award, Actor in a Special Planning Drama	Daemang	Nominated	
SBS Drama Awards	2008	Excellence Award, Actor in a Special Planning Drama	Tazza	Won	
SBS Drama Awards	2008	Top 10 Stars	Tazza / Robber	Won	
SBS Drama Awards	2011	Top 10 Stars	Midas / Deep Rooted Tree	Won	
SBS Drama Awards	2011	Top Excellence Award, Actor in a Special Planning Drama	Midas	Won	
SBS Drama Awards	2018	Top Excellence Award, Actor in a Monday-Tuesday Drama	Wok of Love	Nominated	
Seoul International Drama Awards	2010	Outstanding Korean Actor	The Slave Hunters	Won	
West Hollywood International Film Festival	2008	Best Actor	Dance of the Dragon	Won	

=== State and cultural honors ===
State and cultural honors
Country	Organization or ceremony	Year	Honor or Award	Ref.
Japan	Korea-Japan Cultural Awards	2010	Acting Award, Cultural Diplomacy category	
South Korea	Korea-Japan Cultural Awards	2010	Acting Award, Cultural Diplomacy category	
South Korea	Taxpayers' Day (Note: Honors are given at the Taxpayers' Day, organized by National Tax Service, Taxpayers' Day in Korea is March 3. An award ceremony is held annually, during which individuals and corporations receive commendation for being model taxpayers.)	2012	Presidential Commendation as Exemplary Taxpayer	

=== Listicles ===
Name of publisher, year listed, name of listicle, and placement
Publisher	Year	Listicle	Placement	Ref.
Korean Film Council	2021	Korean Actors 200 (Note: Introduces 200 actors that best represent the present and future of Korean cinema to the people in the film industry all over the world.)	Included	
