= In the Realm of Ripley =

- 아파트: 리플리의 세계
- Directed by: Chae Soo-eung Chuck
- Written by: Chae Soo-eung Chuck; Hee Kum-kyo
- Produced by: Lee Eun-jung
- Starring: Jang Hyuk
- Cinematography: Park Jung-hoon
- Edited by: Kim Woo Il
- Music by: Steffen Schmidt
- Production company: Aria Studios
- Release date: 28 August 2024 (Venice)
- Running time: 55 minutes
- Country: South Korea
- Language: Korean

In the Realm of Ripley, also known as Apartment: In the Realm of Ripley (Korean: 아파트: 리플리의 세계) is a 2024 South Korean action film directed by Chae Soo-eung, starring Jang Hyuk. It is an interactive thriller film which the audience's choice influences the story's development.

== Plot ==
The film is set in 2080, when the memory preservation system "Mind Upload" was commercialised by the researchers at the CSAL (Computer Simulated After-Life) Institute due to the development of brain waves and quantum technology.

Si-hyuk is a 10-year-old boy who is brain-dead, and also the sole eye-witness of a murder that took place in 2009. His last memory of the apartment which he lived with his mother holds all the clues to the case. In order solve the cold case, Detective Park taps into his memory using the new technology. However, as the boy suffered from Ripley's syndrome, the line between truth and lies gets blurred. Being an interactive film, the audience's choices will influence the story's outcome.

== Cast ==
- Jang Hyuk as Detective Park
- Jo Bok-rae as Dr Kim Nam-joo
- Moon Joo-yeon as Psychiatrist
- Song Jae-hee as Neurologist
- Jo Yun-seo as Si-hyuk's mother
- Lee Joon-kyung as Si-hyuk

== Release ==
The film made its world premiere at the 81st Venice International Film Festival on 28 August 2024, competing in the immersive section.
