= Wang Ji-won =

South Korean actress and ballet dancer (born 1988)

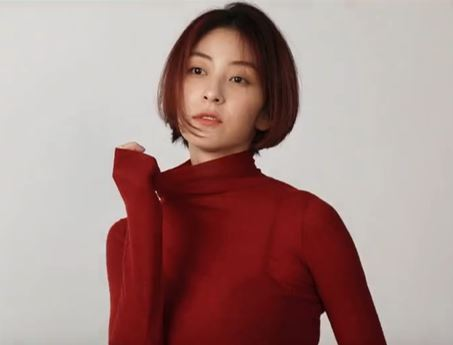
- Born: November 12, 1988 (age 37); South Korea
- Education: Royal Ballet School; Korea National University of Arts - Dance
- Occupations: Actress; ballet dancer
- Years active: 2010–present
- Agent: Billions
- Spouse: Park Jong-suk (m. 2022)

Korean name
- Hangul: 왕지원
- RR: Wang Jiwon
- MR: Wang Chiwŏn

Wang Ji-won (Korean: 왕지원; born November 12, 1988) is a South Korean actress and ballet dancer.

== Career ==
Wang trained with the Royal Ballet School in England and studied Dance at the Korea National University of Arts, she was a member of the Korea National Ballet in 2009. Wang began acting in 2012 and has appeared in television dramas, notably I Need Romance 3 and You Are My Destiny.

In December 2018, Wang signed with YG Entertainment. She decided not to renew and has signed a contract with SH Media Corp.

== Personal life ==
On January 20, 2022 it was confirmed that Wang is preparing for marriage with ballerino Park Jong-suk, a principal dancer with the Korea National Ballet. They got married in Seoul on February 6, 2022.

== Filmography ==
=== Television series ===
Year	Title	Role
2012	Family	Instructor
2013	Good Doctor	Kim Sun-joo
2013	The Heirs	Yang Da-kyung (ep.17,19-20)
2014	I Need Romance 3	Oh Se-ryung
2014	Another Parting	Seo Ha-na
2014	You Are My Destiny	Kang Se-ra
2015	Divorce Lawyer in Love	Jo Soo-ah
2016	Immortal Goddess	Lee Yoo-ri
2017	Hospital Ship	Choi Young-eun
2018	Still 17	Kim Tae-rin
2022	Never Give Up	Cha Yoo-jin
2024	My Sweet Mobster	Ji Won (cameo, ep.3)

=== Films ===
Year	Title	Role
2017	One Line	Hae-sun

=== Variety shows ===
Year	Title	Role	Ref.
2017	The Swan Club	Cast Member	
2023	Same Bed, Different Dreams 2: You Are My Destiny	Cast Member	

== Awards and nominations ==
Name of the award ceremony, year presented, category, nominee of the award, and the result of the nomination
Award ceremony	Year	Category	Nominee / Work	Result	Ref.
MBC Drama Awards	2017	Excellence Award, Actress in a Miniseries	Hospital Ship	Nominated	
