= Kim Tae-kyun (baseball, born 1982) =

South Korean baseball player

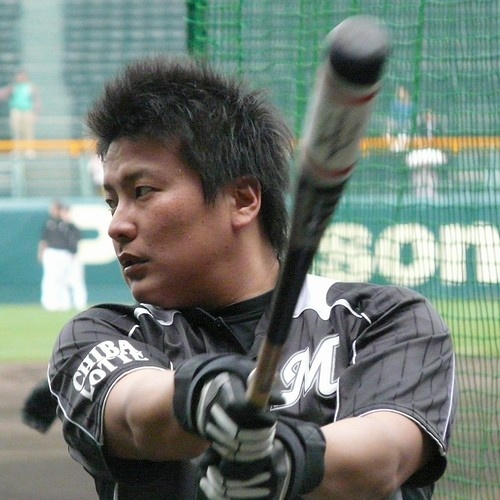
- First baseman
- Born: May 29, 1982 (age 44)
- Batted: Right Threw: Right

Professional debut
- KBO: April 17, 2001, for the Hanwha Eagles
- NPB: March 20, 2010, for the Chiba Lotte Marines

Last appearance
- KBO: 2021, for the Hanwha Eagles
- NPB: June 15, 2011, for the Chiba Lotte Marines

KBO statistics
- Batting average: .320
- Home runs: 311
- Runs batted in: 1,358

NPB statistics
- Batting average: .265
- Home runs: 22
- Runs batted in: 106
- Stats at Baseball Reference

Teams
- Hanwha Eagles (2001–2009); Chiba Lotte Marines (2010–2011); Hanwha Eagles (2012–2021)

Career highlights and awards
- KBO: KBO Rookie of the Year (2001); 3x Golden Glove Award (2005, 2008, 2016); International: All-World Baseball Classic Team (2009)
Medals
Men's baseball
Representing South Korea
World Baseball Classic
Silver medal – second place	2009 Los Angeles	Team
Bronze medal – third place	2006 San Diego	Team
World Junior Baseball Championship
Gold medal – first place	2000 Edmonton	Team

- Kim Tae-kyun
- Hangul: 김태균
- Hanja: 金泰均
- RR: Gim Taegyun
- MR: Kim T'aegyun

Kim Tae-kyun (Korean: 김태균; Hanja: 金泰均; born May 29, 1982) is a South Korean first baseman who played for the Hanwha Eagles in the KBO League. He bats and throws right-handed. He is one of the top career hitters in the KBO, with a lifetime batting average over .320, and more than 300 career home runs and 1300 runs batted in.

== Amateur career ==
Kim attended Bugil High School in Cheonan, South Chungcheong Province, South Korea. In 2000, he was selected for the South Korean Junior National Team. The team won the 2000 World Junior Baseball Championship in Edmonton, Canada, and Kim led the attack alongside Lee Dae-ho, Choo Shin-soo (the eventual MVP of this event), and Jeong Keun-woo, batting .433 with 3 home runs.

=== Notable international careers ===
Year	Venue	Competition	Team	Individual note
2000	Canada	World Junior Baseball Championship	Gold medal	.433 BA (13-for-30), 3 HR, 11 RBI

== Professional career ==
Kim was a first-round pick of the Hanhwa Eagles in 2001 following a successful youth career. He made his KBO debut on April 17, 2001, as a starting first baseman against the Hyundai Unicorns. As a rookie in 2001, he hit 20 home runs and drove in 54 runs with a .335 batting average. After the 2001 season, Kim was honored with the KBO League Rookie of the Year Award. He became the first Eagles player to win the award.

In 2002, Kim experienced a sophomore slump, batting .255 with 7 home runs, but came back strong in 2003 to bat .319 with 31 home runs and 95 RBIs.

From 2003 through 2005, he notched three consecutive seasons batting .300+.

His stats dipped slightly in 2006 and 2007, but he broke out again in 2008, batting .324 with 31 home runs and 92 RBIs. He was first in home runs and slugging percentage, 4th in RBI, and 5th in batting average.

Kim performed spectacularly in the 2009 World Baseball Classic, driving in 11 runs to lead all players, as well as scoring nine runs. As a result, he was named to the 2009 All WBC Team as the first baseman. (South Korea was the runner-up to Japan in the 2009 WBC.)

Kim left the KBO for Nippon Professional Baseball in 2010–2011, playing for the Chiba Lotte Marines. He had success his first year in the NPB, hitting .268 with 21 home runs and 92 RBI. 2011 was not as successful, as Kim only played in 31 games and hit only .250.

He returned to the Hanhwa Eagles in 2012, and has played with them ever since. In his first season back in the KBO League, Kim hit .363 to lead the league. He hit .365 in both 2014 and 2016, finishing second in the batting title both seasons. His 136 RBI in 2016 was also second in the league.

On 6 June 2020, Kim became the youngest player in the KBO to reach the career milestone of 3,500 total bases. Kim was the fourth player in the KBO League to reach 3,500 total bases in his career, and the first right-handed hitter to do it, after lefties Yang Joon-hyuk, Lee Seung-yuop, and Park Yong-taik. He is also the youngest to ever do it, about two months ahead of Yang, who was 38 years old, two months, and nine days old.

== Personal life ==
Kim was Cheongan-si Ambassador to South Chungcheong Province in April 2009. He was a Neowiz Games Slugger PR Ambassador in May 2009. He was a Korean Red Cross Ambassador in 2013 and May 2014. He was a Good Driver's Mileage Ambassador in July 2013.

== Awards, honors, and achievements ==
- 2001 Rookie of the Year
- 2005 Golden Glove Award (1B)
- 2008 Golden Glove Award (1B), Home Run Title, Slugging Percentage Leader
- 2012 KBO League Batting Champion, Bases on Balls Leader
- 2016 Bases on Balls Leader
- 2017 Professional Baseball 'Sports Seoul' Record of the Year Award
- 2016 KBO Golden Glove designated hitter Award

=== Career statistics (KBO) ===
Year	Team	G	AB	R	H	2B	3B	HR	RBI	SB	SF	BB	HBP	SO	GIDP	E	AVG	SLG	OBP
2001	Hanwha	88	245	51	82	13	2	20	54	2	0	40	4	72	4	3	.335	.649	.436
2002	Hanwha	105	298	25	76	11	0	7	34	2	3	41	2	103	13	11	.255	.362	.347
2003	Hanwha	133	479	67	153	24	2	31	95	3	6	79	9	106	13	6	.319	.572	.424
2004	Hanwha	129	473	76	153	26	1	23	106	2	7	70	6	99	11	7	.323	.529	.412
2005	Hanwha	124	461	73	146	33	2	23	100	3	2	60	6	73	20	5	.317	.547	.401
2006	Hanwha	124	423	66	123	27	0	13	73	2	0	82	2	89	18	3	.291	.447	.405
2007	Hanwha	118	393	62	114	13	0	21	85	2	0	90	2	70	13	4	.290	.483	.420
2008	Hanwha	115	410	81	133	27	1	31^{1}	92	2	5	64	5	67	8	3	.324	.622^{1}	.417
2009	Hanwha	95	336	63	111	15	0	19	62	2	2	51	4	71	12	1	.330	.545	.416
2010	Chiba Lotte Marines (NPB)																		
2011	Chiba Lotte Marines (NPB)																		
2012	Hanwha	126	416	61	151	24	0	16	80	3	5	81^{1}	11	69	11	2	.363^{1}	.536	.474
2013	Hanwha	101	345	41	110	24	0	10	52	0	4	73	8	67	14	1	.319	.475	.444
2014	Hanwha	118	422	66	154	30	0	18	84	0	5	70	11	73	18	3	.365	.564	.463
2015	Hanwha	133	408	61	129	28	0	21	104	3	5	98	12	80	19	9	.316	.539	.457
2016	Hanwha	144	529	94	193	39	0	23	136	1	6	108^{1}	9	97	11	4	.365	.569	.475
2017	Hanwha	94	356	51	121	22	0	17	76	0	4	43	4	56	13	1	.340	.545	.413
2018	Hanwha	73	254	25	80	11	0	10	34	0	0	13	4	56	7	2	.315	.476	.358
2019	Hanwha	127	433	47	132	21	0	6	62	3	8	54	5	94	15	1	.305	.395	.382
Career totals		1,947	6,681	1,010	2,161	389	8	309	1,329	28	67	1,111	106	1,342	220	66	.324	.533	.431

^1 League-leader.

=== Notable international tournaments ===
Year	Venue	Competition	Team	Individual note
2001	Chinese Taipei	Baseball World Cup	6th	.286 BA (2-for-7), 2 BB
2003	Cuba	Baseball World Cup	8th	.382 BA (13-for-34), 3 HR, 9 RBI, 10 R, 6 BB
2006	United States	World Baseball Classic	Bronze medal	.000 BA (0-for-1), 2 BB
2009	United States	World Baseball Classic	Silver medal	.345 BA (10-for-29), 3 HR, 11 RBI, 9 R, 8 BB; All-Star (1B), HR / RBI / R title
2010	China	Guangzhou Asian Games	Gold medal	

== Filmography ==
=== Television shows ===
Year	Title	Role	Notes	Ref.
2021	National Bang Bang Cook Cook	Cast Member	Episode 1–12	
2021–present	The Return of Superman	Cast Member		
2022	Back to the Ground	Participant		
2022	Tomorrow is a Genius	Cast Member		
2023	Hell Court	Regular Member		

== See also ==
- List of KBO career home run leaders
- List of KBO career RBI leaders
- List of KBO career hits leaders
