= Han Chae-ah =

South Korean actress (born 1982)

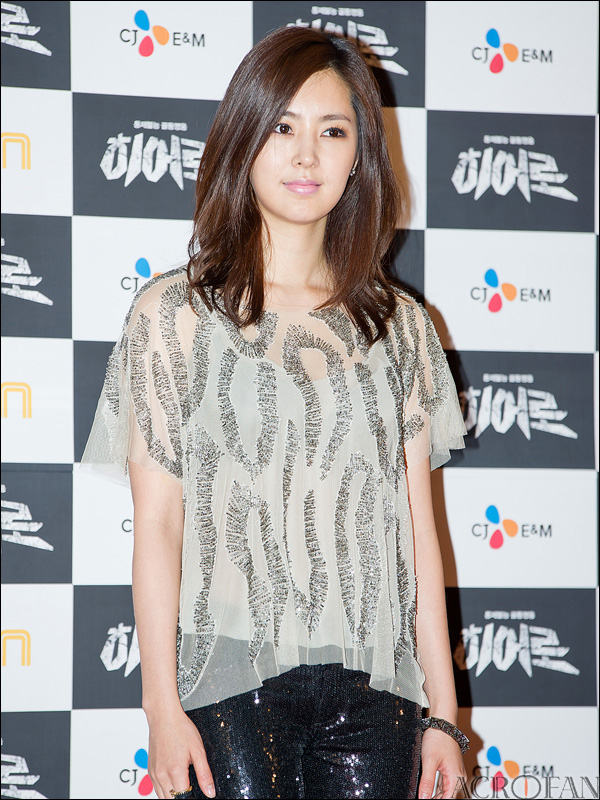
- Han in 2012
- Born: Kim Seo Hyun; March 24, 1982 (age 44); Busan, South Korea
- Occupation: Actress
- Years active: 2006–present
- Agent: Neverdie Entertainment
- Spouse: Cha Se-jji (m. 2018)
- Children: 1

Korean name
- Hangul: 김서현
- RR: Gim Seohyeon
- MR: Kim Sŏhyŏn

Stage name
- Hangul: 한채아
- RR: Han Chaea
- MR: Han Ch'aea

Han Chae-ah (Korean: 한채아; born March 24, 1982), birth name Kim Seo-hyun (김서현), is a South Korean actress. She is best known for her 2012 television dramas, playing a detective in Hero, and a Japanese collaborator in Bridal Mask.

== Personal life ==
According to Mystic Entertainment on March 8, 2018, Han married South Korean football legend Cha Bum-kun's youngest son Cha Se-jji on May. On April 4, 2018, Han announced on her instagram that she is expecting a first child after being six weeks pregnant. Their wedding ceremony was held at a hotel in Seoul on May 6, 2018. She gave birth to a daughter on October 30 of the same year.

== Filmography ==
=== Film ===
| Year | Title | Role | Notes | Ref. |
|---|---|---|---|---|
| 2012 | The King of XXX-Kissing | Sun-hee | | |
| 2015 | Made in China | Mi | | |
| 2015 | Big Deal | Ji-in | | |
| 2017 | Part-Time Spy | Na Jeong-an | | |
| 2022 | A Letter from Kyoto | Jang Hye-jin | KAFA Graduation Research Film | |

=== Television series ===
| Year | Title | Role | Notes | Ref. |
|---|---|---|---|---|
| 2008 | Kokkiri (Elephant) | Gook Chae-ah | | |
| 2009 | Style | Cha Ji-sun | | |
| 2010 | Definitely Neighbors | Yoon Ha-young | | |
| 2011 | I Believe in Love | Kim Myung-hee | | |
| 2012 | Hero | Yoon Yi-on | | |
| 2012 | Bridal Mask | Ueno Rie/Lara/Chae Hong-joo | | |
| 2012 | Ohlala Couple | Victoria Kim | | |
| 2013 | All About My Romance | Ahn Hee-sun | | |
| 2013 | Marry Him If You Dare | Seo Yoo-kyung | | |
| 2014–2015 | You Are the Only One | Song Do-won | | |
| 2015–2016 | The Merchant: Gaekju 2015 | Jo So-sa | | |
| 2017 | Introverted Boss | Chae Ji-hye | | |
| 2021 | The King's Affection | Crown Princess Han | Cameo (Episode 1–2) | |
| 2022 | The Golden Spoon | Jin Seon-hye | | |
| 2023 | The Secret Romantic Guesthouse | Hwa-ryeong | | |
| 2024 | Nothing Uncovered | Yoo Yun-young | | |
| 2026 | Oh! My Guard | So Hyun-joo | | |

=== Television shows ===
| Year | Title | Role | Notes | Ref. |
|---|---|---|---|---|
| 2007–2010 | Fantasy Couple - Classroom of Love | Host | | |
| 2013–2014 | Alumni Association Together | Host | | |
| 2015 | Real Men: Female Edition 3 | Cast member | | |
| 2016 | I Live Alone | Cast member | Episodes 146–171 | |
| 2017 | Battle Trip | Contestant | with Ha Jae-sook (Episodes 48–49) | |
| 2017 | Baek Jong-won's Top 3 Chef King | Special host | Episodes 90–93 | |
| 2019 | The Return of Superman | Narrator | Episode 273–306 | |
| 2021 | Goal Girls | Cast Member | Season 1 | |
| 2023 | Rest Couple | Host | with Shin Dong-yup | |

=== Music video appearances ===
| Year | Song title | Artist |
|---|---|---|
| 2006 | "Love Brings Separation" | Son Ho-young |
| 2008 | "With You" | Ryu Si-won |

== Awards and nominations ==
Name of the award ceremony, year presented, category, nominee of the award, and the result of the nomination
| Award ceremony | Year | Category | Nominee / Work | Result | Ref. |
|---|---|---|---|---|---|
| APAN Star Awards | 2015 | Excellence Award, Actress in a Special Drama | The Merchant: Gaekju 2015 | Nominated | |
| KBS Drama Awards | 2012 | Excellence Award, Actress in a Serial Drama | Bridal Mask | Nominated | |
| KBS Drama Awards | 2013 | Best Couple (with Jung Yong-hwa) | Marry Him If You Dare | Nominated | |
| KBS Drama Awards | 2015 | Excellence Award, Actress in a Mid-length Drama | The Merchant: Gaekju 2015, You Are the Only One | Nominated | |
| KBS Drama Awards | 2015 | Excellence Award, Actress in a Daily Drama (tied with Kang Byul) | The Merchant: Gaekju 2015, You Are the Only One | Won | |
| KBS Drama Awards | 2015 | Best Couple (with Jang Hyuk) | The Merchant: Gaekju 2015, You Are the Only One | Won | |
| MBC Drama Awards | 2022 | Best Supporting Actress | The Golden Spoon | Nominated | |
| SBS Drama Awards | 2010 | New Star Award | Definitely Neighbors | Won | |
| SBS Drama Awards | 2013 | Excellence Award, Actress in a Miniseries | All About My Romance | Nominated | |
| SBS Drama Awards | 2023 | Best Supporting Actress in a Miniseries Romance/Comedy Drama | The Secret Romantic Guesthouse | Nominated | |
