= Mr. Back =

- Promotional poster
- Genre: Romance; Comedy; Fantasy
- Based on: Old Man by Lee Jo-young
- Developed by: Han Hee
- Written by: Choi Yoon-jung
- Directed by: Lee Sang-yeob
- Starring: Shin Ha-kyun; Jang Na-ra; Lee Joon; Park Ye Jin
- Opening theme: "In the Time I Love You" by XIA
- Country of origin: South Korea
- Original language: Korean
- No. of episodes: 16

Production
- Executive producer: Cho Yoon-jung
- Production company: Victory Contents

Original release
- Network: Munhwa Broadcasting Corporation
- Release: November 5 – December 25, 2014

Mr. Back (Korean: 미스터 백) is a South Korean television series based on the web novel Old Man (올드맨), which was serialized on KakaoPage from April to October 2014. It stars Shin Ha-kyun, Jang Na-ra and Lee Joon. The series aired on MBC from November 5 to December 25, 2014, for 16 episodes.

== Synopsis ==
Choi Go-bong (meaning "highest peak" or "highest salary") is a 70-year-old man who runs a large hotel conglomerate, and he's known nothing but greed and selfishness all his life. When his body suddenly transforms back into his 30s, he becomes gleeful at the chance to relive his youth. He renames himself Choi Shin-hyung (meaning "newest model"), and meets Eun Ha-soo, a part-timer who's just landed her first regular job. Because of Ha-soo, he learns what love is for the first time in his life. At the same time, he develops a relationship with his estranged son and troublesome heir, Choi Dae-han.

== Cast ==
=== Main ===
- Shin Ha-kyun as Choi Go-bong/Choi Shin-hyung
- Jang Na-ra as Eun Ha-soo
- Lee Joon as Choi Dae-han
- Park Ye-jin as Hong Ji-yoon

=== Supporting ===
- Jung Suk-won as Jung Yi-gun
- Hwang Bo-ra as Yoo Nan-hee
- Go Yoon as Kang Ki-chan
- Jo Mi-ryung as Choi Mi-hye
- Jeon Gook-hwan as Choi Young-dal
- Hwang Young-hee as Lee In-ja
- Lee Moon-sik as Sung Kyung-bae
- Lee Mi-do as Son Woo-young
- Lee Mi-young as Go Jung-sook
- Kim Byeong-ok as Go-bong's doctor
- Cho Seung-hee as Herself
- Jang Seong-Beom as Eun Myeong-soo

== Ratings ==
Episode #	Original broadcast date	Average audience share			
Episode #	Original broadcast date	TNmS Ratings		AGB Nielsen	
Episode #	Original broadcast date	Nationwide	Seoul National Capital Area	Nationwide	Seoul National Capital Area
1	November 5, 2014	13.1%	16.9%	14.2%	16.1%
2	November 6, 2014	12.4%	15.2%	13.9%	16.5%
3	November 12, 2014	10.8%	13.1%	11.6%	13.1%
4	November 13, 2014	12.1%	15.9%	13.3%	15.4%
5	November 19, 2014	10.9%	14.6%	11.2%	12.8%
6	November 20, 2014	10.4%	14.1%	11.1%	12.3%
7	November 26, 2014	10.2%	13.0%	10.9%	12.6%
8	November 27, 2014	10.0%	13.0%	10.0%	11.5%
9	December 3, 2014	9.5%	11.9%	10.5%	12.0%
10	December 4, 2014	9.8%	13.0%	10.4%	12.0%
11	December 10, 2014	8.9%	10.9%	9.1%	10.4%
12	December 11, 2014	8.8%	10.3%	9.5%	10.6%
13	December 17, 2014	9.0%	11.4%	9.0%	10.4%
14	December 18, 2014	9.0%	10.3%	9.2%	10.3%
15	December 24, 2014	8.1%	9.8%	8.8%	10.4%
16	December 25, 2014	9.1%	12.1%	10.6%	12.1%
Average		10.1%	12.8%	10.8%	12.4%

== Awards and nominations ==
Year	Award	Category	Recipient	Result
2014	33rd MBC Drama Awards	Top Excellence Award, Actor in a Miniseries	Shin Ha-kyun	Nominated
2014	33rd MBC Drama Awards	Top Excellence Award, Actress in a Miniseries	Jang Na-ra	Won
2014	33rd MBC Drama Awards	Excellence Award, Actress in a Miniseries	Park Ye-jin	Nominated
2014	33rd MBC Drama Awards	Golden Acting Award, Actor	Jeon Guk-hwan	Nominated
2014	33rd MBC Drama Awards	Best New Actor	Lee Joon	Nominated
2014	33rd MBC Drama Awards	Popularity Award, Actor	Shin Ha-kyun	Won
2014	33rd MBC Drama Awards	Popularity Award, Actress	Jang Na-ra	Won
