= Hello Monster =

South Korean television series

- Promotional poster
- Also known as: I Remember You
- Hangul: 너를 기억해
- Hanja: 너를 記憶해
- Lit.: Remember you
- RR: Neoreul gieokhae
- MR: Nŏrŭl kiŏkhae
- Genre: Thriller; Mystery; Police procedural
- Created by: KBS Drama Division
- Written by: Kwon Ki-young
- Directed by: Noh Sang-hoon; Kim Jin-won
- Starring: Seo In-guk; Jang Na-ra; Choi Won-young; Park Bo-gum
- Composer: Lee Pil-ho
- Country of origin: South Korea
- Original language: Korean
- No. of episodes: 16

Production
- Executive producers: Choi Jin-hee; Park Ji-young; Jung Sung-hyo
- Producers: Hwang Ui-kyung; Lee Na-jung; Park Woo-ram
- Cinematography: Park Sung; Kim Kyung-ho
- Editor: Kim Young-joo
- Running time: 70 minutes
- Production company: CJ E&M

Original release
- Network: KBS2
- Release: June 22 – August 11, 2015

Hello Monster (Korean: 너를 기억해; RR: Neoreul gieokhae) is a South Korean television series starring Seo In-guk, Jang Na-ra, Choi Won-young, and Park Bo-gum. It aired on KBS2 from June 22 to August 11, 2015 every Monday and Tuesday at 21:55 for 16 episodes. Park's performance was widely praised by audience and critics and won him the Best Supporting Actor Award and Popularity Award at the 29th KBS Drama Awards.

== Synopsis ==
Genius profiler Lee Hyun, returns home to Korea after something from a case he has been sent triggers a memory he thought he had lost forever. Unbeknownst to him, one of his team members, Detective Cha Ji-an, has been investigating him for some time. She is aware that his father was murdered and his brother disappeared under mysterious circumstances involving a criminal named Lee Joon Young whom they both want found and incarcerated. Each seeks to unravel the other, unaware that they've been drawn into a dangerous game of cat and mouse by a master player and that both truth and evil are closer and far more twisted than they think.

== Cast ==
=== Main ===
- Seo In-guk as Lee Hyun / David Lee
  - Hong Hyun-taek as young Lee Hyun

Lee Hyun was a "strange child" who caught the attention of his father, a police inspector, who later confined him in a small room to prevent him from breeding criminal thoughts. An intelligent child, he later studies abroad and becomes a reputed professor. Strangely, he loses his childhood memories, and a series of events lead him to return to South Korea. There he tries to solve numerous murder cases that seem to be linked to one another in order to find his long-lost little brother, whom he presumed to be the serial killer.

- Jang Na-ra as Cha Ji-an
  - Park Ji-so as young Cha Ji-an

Cha Ji-an's father mysteriously disappeared together with Lee Joon-young, a convicted prisoner who was said to have escaped from confinement. She becomes a police inspector and meets Lee Hyun, the boy she has been stalking since her childhood. Their similar circumstances lead them together as they work to solve criminal cases.

- Choi Won-young as Lee Joon-ho / Lee Joon-young
  - Doh Kyung-soo as teen Lee Joon-young

Born as a result of rape, Joon-young was neglected as a child. He soon bred murderous thoughts and became a murderer who eventually escaped from prison. 20 years later, he returned with the identity of Lee Joon-ho. His main personality trait throughout the series was depicted as someone who doesn't understand complexities of human emotions while being well versed in their thoughts. For-example, from his perspective, his returning of Cha Ji-an's father's remains was a good deed despite having killed and framed the guy himself. Knowing how her father ended up 20 years ago made her angry at him but he was sad to see Cha Ji-an being angry and couldn't figure out the reason despite it being very obvious to others.
He doesn't think he ever did anything bad since there was always a justifiable reason for himself.
In his own words, Lee Hyun was the kid he wanted to be while Lee Min was the kid who came to resemble him.

- Park Bo-gum as Jung Sun-ho / Lee Min
  - Hong Eun-taek as young Lee Min

Lee Min shared a close relationship with Lee Hyun as a child and often confided his darkest secrets to him. He feels neglected later on as he was under the misconception that he had been abandoned by his brother after their father was murdered. He later appears nearly 20 years later using the name Jung Sun-ho.

=== Supporting ===
- Lee Chun-hee as Kang Eun-hyuk

The leader of the special investigator team and the son of the police commissioner

- Min Sung-wook as Son Myung-woo

Special investigator member and senior of Cha Ji-an. He is cynical and is annoyed by Lee Hyun's attitude

- Kim Jae-young as Min Seung-joo

The youngest member of the team. He is a bright young man who is cheerful

- Son Seung-won as Choi Eun-bok

Special investigator team member. He is a slightly quiet person. Unbeknownst to the team, he is one of the kids that Lee Joon-young saved from his hellish childhood life

- Im Ji-eun as Hyun Ji-soo

Planning director of the investigation team and Lee Hyun's adoptive mother

- Nam Kyung-eup (ko) as Kang Seok-joo

Police commissioner and father of Kang Eun-hyuk

- Lee Bom as Joon-ho's mother

She was raped and gave birth to Lee Joon-ho

== Production ==
The first script reading took place in the end of April 2015 at KBS Annex in Yeouido, Seoul, South Korea.

== Reception ==
=== Critical response ===
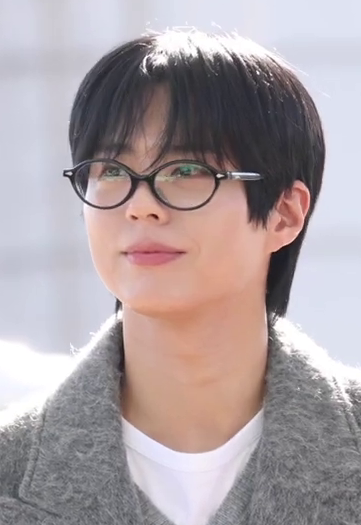
Park Bo-gum received praise for his performance

Park Bo-gum's performance received widespread critical and audience acclaim and won him the Best Supporting Actor Award and Popularity Award at the 29th KBS Drama Awards. In 2025, in a career retrospective for Park, Gulf News stated that Park's performance in the series was "his best role yet in a stellar career... proving his ability to shape-shift into what the role demanded—even if the show wasn't always a hit, Bo-gum always was."

=== Viewership ===
In this table, the blue numbers represent the lowest ratings and the red numbers represent the highest ratings.

Ep.	Original broadcast date	Title	Average audience share			
Ep.	Original broadcast date	Title	TNmS		AGB Nielsen	
Ep.	Original broadcast date	Title	Nationwide	Seoul	Nationwide	Seoul
1	June 22, 2015	Every Child's Story Begins with Their Parents	5.6%	5.4%	4.7%	4.7%
2	June 23, 2015	Hello, Monster	5.6%	5.8%	4.7%	4.5%
3	June 29, 2015	Thou Shall Not Kill, But...	5.2%	5.8%	4.7%	4.8%
4	June 30, 2015	The Suspect, Lee Hyun	4.9%	5.0%	4.0%	4.1%
5	July 6, 2015	Borne Back Ceaselessly into the Past	4.6%	4.8%	4.6%	4.8%
6	July 7, 2015	The Blood of a Murderer	5.4%	5.5%	4.8%	4.9%
7	July 13, 2015	Let's Be Partners?	5.0%	5.2%	4.7%	4.5%
8	July 14, 2015	Remember Me	4.2%	4.7%	4.6%	5.0%
9	July 20, 2015	Stalker S	4.5%	4.6%	4.9%	5.1%
10	July 21, 2015	Find Me	4.6%	4.7%	5.0%	5.0%
11	July 27, 2015	Birth of a Monster	4.7%	5.1%	4.8%	4.9%
12	July 28, 2015	If I Had to Kill Somebody...	4.6%	5.5%	5.0%	5.2%
13	August 3, 2015	What Choice Would You Make?	4.1%	4.1%	4.5%	4.7%
14	August 4, 2015	Lee Joon-young's Room	4.7%	4.9%	5.3%	5.4%
15	August 10, 2015	Is a Happy Ending Possible?	4.6%	5.0%	4.5%	4.9%
16	August 11, 2015	I Remember You	4.3%	4.3%	5.1%	5.3%
Average			4.8%	5.0%	4.7%	4.9%

- The drama aired with English subtitles on KBS World a week after its initial broadcast in Korea.

== Awards and nominations ==
Year	Award	Category	Recipient	Result	Ref.
2015	8th Korea Drama Awards	Top Excellence Award, Actress	Jang Na-ra	Nominated	
2015	8th Korea Drama Awards	Excellence Award, Actor	Seo In-guk	Nominated	
2015	8th Korea Drama Awards	Best Screenplay	Kwon Ki-young	Nominated	
2015	4th APAN Star Awards	Best New Actor	Park Bo-gum	Nominated	
2015	29th KBS Drama Awards	Best Supporting Actor	Park Bo-gum	Won	
2015	29th KBS Drama Awards	Popularity Award, Actor	Park Bo-gum	Won	
2015	29th KBS Drama Awards	Excellence Award, Actor in a Mini-series	Seo In-guk	Nominated	
2015	29th KBS Drama Awards	Excellence Award, Actress in a Mini-series	Jang Na-ra	Nominated	

== International broadcast ==
Country	Network(s)/Station(s)	Series premiere	Title	Ref.
Malaysia	TV2	September 2 – October 7, 2018 (Sunday - Tuesday, 20:30 – 21:30); December 23, 2018 (Sunday - Tuesday, 20:30 – 21:30) [Re-aired]	I Remember You	
