= You Are My Destiny (2014 TV series) =

2014 South Korean television series

- Promotional poster
- Genre: Romance; Comedy; Drama
- Written by: Joo Chan-ok; Jo Jin-kook
- Directed by: Lee Dong-yoon; Kim Hee-won
- Starring: Jang Hyuk; Jang Na-ra; Choi Jin-hyuk; Wang Ji-won
- Country of origin: South Korea
- Original language: Korean
- No. of episodes: 20

Production
- Executive producer: Kim Sang-ho
- Producers: Kim Mi-na; Jung Jae-yeon
- Production locations: South Korea; Macau
- Production companies: Number Three Pictures (N3); Page One Films

Original release
- Network: Munhwa Broadcasting Corporation
- Release: July 2 – September 4, 2014

Related
- Fated to Love You (2008); You're My Destiny (2017)

You Are My Destiny (Korean: 운명처럼 널 사랑해; RR: Unmyeongcheoreom neol saranghae; lit. 'Fated to Love You') is a 2014 South Korean television series starring Jang Hyuk, Jang Na-ra, Choi Jin-hyuk and Wang Ji-won. It aired on MBC from July 2 to September 4, 2014, on Wednesdays and Thursdays at 21:55 for 20 episodes.

It is a remake of the Taiwanese drama Fated to Love You starring Joe Chen and Ethan Ruan, which received high ratings during its run in 2008. The series also reunited Jang Hyuk and Jang Na-ra, who previously starred together twelve years earlier on Successful Story of a Bright Girl (2002).

== Synopsis ==
Lee Gun (Jang Hyuk) is the successor to a large company run by his family. Kim Mi Young (Jang Na-ra) is an average-looking secretary in a law firm who earned the nickname "Post-It" for her inability to say no to her colleagues who dump often tedious work on her. When the two cross paths one night after separately having drunk a drugged liquid, a comedy of errors occurs. Kim Mi Young goes into the wrong hotel room because the hotel door number accidentally changes, and the door was propped open by the mischief-making drugged liquid makers. The two end up sleeping together and Kim Mi Young becomes pregnant. Lee Gun and his grandmother are about to lose power in the company due to his failure to marry his love (a ballerina, Kang Se Ra) and produce a male heir. Lee Gun and Mi-Young got married after knowing each other for "four days and two nights" and the story is that of an unwilling couple learning to love each other. Se Ra (Wang Ji-won) and Daniel (Choi Jin Hyuk) are the alternative love interests.

Other important themes which drive the storyline are: responsibility and hereditary disease, the search for an international adoptee for birth family, and dealing with grief at the loss of an unborn child.

== Cast ==
=== Main ===
- Jang Hyuk as Lee Gun

The wealthy heir to a large chemical company with a trademark maniacal laugh. He is a descendant, the only one of his generation, of the distinguished Jeonju Lee clan, a lineage that has all the males dying in their thirties due to Huntington's disease. Though utterly devoted and affectionate towards the people he cares about, Lee Gun can be cold, selfish, and prickly to everyone else. However, he is genuinely warm-hearted and responsible, wanting to do his best for Mi-young and their baby. Although he was shocked and reluctant at the news of a shotgun wedding, Gun starts warming up to Mi-young's sweet nature and pure heart.

- Jang Na-ra as Kim Mi-young/Ellie Kim

A meek and timid office worker at a law firm. She has no wealthy family, prestigious education, nor is she considered a beauty, but rather comes from a small island where her mom owns a small restaurant. Because of her timid and kind-to-a-fault nature, she cannot bear to turn down a request from anyone and is nicknamed the "post-it girl," someone who is necessary but unimportant. While she lacks self-confidence, Mi-young always sees the best in people and upholds a quiet strength. When an accidental one-night stand gets her pregnant, her plain and insignificant existence changes as Lee Gun enters her life.

- Choi Jin-hyuk as Daniel Pitt/Kim Tae-ho

An internationally famous Korean-American designer whose single goal is finding his long-lost biological sister. He meets Mi-young by accident, and is intrigued by her kindness. From then on, he becomes her Daddy-Long-Legs, encouraging her when she is down and coming to her rescue when she needs help. Constantly worrying about her, Daniel begins to realize that what he feels towards Mi-young is something more than protectiveness. He is the biological brother of Kang Se-ra.

- Wang Ji-won as Kang Se-ra/Kim Mi-young

The love of Lee Gun's life. She is a ballerina in New York City with a surprisingly no-nonsense attitude. She has been with Gun for 6 years, delaying any plans of marriage for her career. But when she fails to get a lead part, Se-ra comes back to Korea to stay with Gun. A sudden callback has her choosing ballet over Gun one more time, but when she comes back for good, she finds drastic changes in Gun's life. She is the long-lost biological sister of Daniel Pitt.

=== Supporting ===
- Park Won-sook as Chairwoman Wang, Lee Gun's grandmother
- Choi Dae-chul as Manager Tak
- Choi Woo-shik as Lee Yong, Lee Gun's half-brother
- Na Young-hee as Lee Gun's stepmother and Lee Yong's mother
- Song Ok-sook as Mi-young's mother
- Park Hee-von as Jeon Ji-yeon, Mi-young's co-worker and roommate who later becomes Yong's girlfriend
- Oh Sol-mi as Kim Mi-sook, Mi-young's oldest sister
- Lee Mi-do as Kim Mi-ja, Mi-young's second oldest sister
- Jung Eun-pyo as Company president Park, owner of soap factory
- Im Hyung-joon as Mr. Choi, Mi-ja's husband
- Jang Gwang as Doctor Moon
- Park Jin-woo as Lawyer Hong
- Kim Young-hoon as Lawyer Min Byung-chul
- Yang Geum-seok as Se-ra's mother
- Park Sun-hee as Eun-jung
- Jung Han-hyun as Lee Sung-mok
- Im Ji-hyun as Soo-hyun
- Yeon Mi-joo as Miss Kim
- Park Hee-jin as Prenatal class instructor/Baby store employee/Dance instructor
- Kim Sung-il as Stylist
- Park Tae-yoon as Makeup artist
- Jung Gyu-soo as Psychiatrist
- Ki Se-hyung as Security guard
- Shin Young-il as Moderator at auction event
- Kim Sun-woong as Moon Woo Bin
- Clara Lee as Hye-jin, shampoo commercial model (cameo, ep 1)
- Jung Joon-young as Radio DJ (cameo, ep 8)
- Joon Park as Himself, body wash commercial model (cameo, ep 13)
- Kim Sun-woong as Moon Woo-bin (cameo, ep 20)
- Kim Yong-gun as Ji-yeon's chaebol father (cameo, ep 20)

== Original soundtrack ==
You Are My Destiny: Original Soundtrack

Soundtrack album by Various Artists
- Released: August 28, 2014
- Genre: Soundtrack
- Labels: Forest Media; LOEN Entertainment; L100004940
- Producer: Oh Joon-sung

Part 1:
No.	Title	Artist	Length
1.	"Morning of Canon" (캐논의 아침)	Baek A-yeon	3:43
2.	"Morning of Canon (Inst.)" (캐논의 아침)	Baek A-yeon	3:43

Part 2:
No.	Title	Artist	Length
1.	"Be the One"	Jeff Bernat	3:36
2.	"Be the One (Inst.)"	Jeff Bernat	3:36

Part 3:
No.	Title	Artist	Length
1.	"Ready for Love"	Megan Lee	3:42
2.	"Ready for Love (Inst.)"	Megan Lee	3:42

Part 4:
No.	Title	Artist	Length
1.	"Destiny Sonata" (운명 같은 너)	Chung Dong-ha (Boohwal)	4:15
2.	"Destiny Sonata (Inst.)" (운명 같은 너)	Chung Dong-ha (Boohwal)	4:15

Part 5:
No.	Title	Artist	Length
1.	"My Girl"	Ken (VIXX)	3:24
2.	"My Girl (Inst.)"	Ken (VIXX)	3:24

Part 6:
No.	Title	Artist	Length
1.	"Goodbye My Love" (잠시 안녕처럼)	Ailee	4:16
2.	"Goodbye My Love (Inst.)" (잠시 안녕처럼)	Ailee	4:16

Part 7:
No.	Title	Artist	Length
1.	"You're My Everything" (사랑을 몰라서)	Melody Day	4:13
2.	"You're My Everything (Inst.)" (사랑을 몰라서)	Melody Day	4:13

Full track list:
No.	Title	Artist	Length
1.	"Destiny Sonata" (운명 같은 너)	Chung Dong-ha (Boohwal)	4:15
2.	"Goodbye My Love" (잠시 안녕처럼)	Ailee	4:16
3.	"Be the One"	Jeff Bernat	3:36
4.	"Morning of Canon" (캐논의 아침)	Baek A-yeon	3:43
5.	"My Girl"	Ken (VIXX)	3:24
6.	"You're My Everything" (사랑을 몰라서)	Melody Day	4:13
7.	"Ready for Love"	Megan Lee	3:42
8.	"Momento (Title)" (instrumental)	Oh Joon-sung	4:29
9.	"Desino" (instrumental)	Oh Joon-sung	4:11
10.	"Stars" (instrumental)	Oh Joon-sung	4:24
11.	"Tristeza" (instrumental)	Oh Joon-sung	3:12
12.	"Joie" (instrumental)	Oh Joon-sung	3:33
13.	"Cordialite" (instrumental)	Oh Joon-sung	3:07
14.	"Awaken" (instrumental)	Oh Joon-sung	4:08
15.	"Lyrisme" (instrumental)	Oh Joon-sung	3:04
16.	"Agnes" (instrumental)	Oh Joon-sung	3:40

== Reception ==
Due to its popularity, the program was also broadcast in selected countries worldwide. Due to Jang Na-ra's popularity in China, the online broadcasting rights went for US$120,000 (₩120 million) per episode, making it the most expensive Korean drama sold in China at the time. It broke previous records held by Three Days and Doctor Stranger, which received US$50,000 and US$80,000 per episode, respectively. This record was later surpassed by My Lovely Girl at US$200,000 per episode.

=== Awards and nominations ===
Year	Award	Category	Recipient	Result	Ref.
2014	7th Korea Drama Awards	Best OST	Goodbye My Love - Ailee	Won	
2014	3rd APAN Star Awards	Top Excellence Award, Actor in a Miniseries	Jang Hyuk	Nominated	
2014	3rd APAN Star Awards	Top Excellence Award, Actress in a Miniseries	Jang Na-ra	Nominated	
2014	3rd APAN Star Awards	Best OST	Goodbye My Love - Ailee	Won	
2014	MBC Drama Awards	Top Excellence Award, Actor in a Miniseries	Jang Hyuk	Won	
2014	MBC Drama Awards	Top Excellence Award, Actress in a Miniseries	Jang Na-ra	Won	
2014	MBC Drama Awards	Golden Acting Award, Actress	Song Ok-sook	Nominated	
2014	MBC Drama Awards	Best New Actress	Wang Ji-won	Nominated	
2014	MBC Drama Awards	Popularity Award, Actress	Jang Na-ra	Won	
2014	MBC Drama Awards	Best Couple Award	Jang Hyuk and Jang Na-ra	Won	

=== Viewership ===
Ep.	Broadcast date	Average audience share			
Ep.	Broadcast date	TNmS		AGB Nielsen	
Ep.	Broadcast date	Nationwide	Seoul	Nationwide	Seoul
1	July 2, 2014	6.0%	7.7%	6.6%	7.2%
2	July 3, 2014	6.3%	7.5%	7.2%	7.6%
3	July 9, 2014	8.8%	11.4%	7.9%	8.5%
4	July 10, 2014	7.9%	10.3%	9.0%	10.3%
5	July 16, 2014	9.1%	10.8%	8.6%	8.9%
6	July 17, 2014	9.6%	11.9%	9.7%	10.5%
7	July 23, 2014	9.6%	11.3%	9.7%	10.7%
8	July 24, 2014	10.6%	13.5%	10.6%	11.8%
9	July 30, 2014	9.4%	12.4%	10.2%	11.8%
10	July 31, 2014	8.9%	10.6%	9.7%	10.7%
11	August 6, 2014	9.8%	12.1%	9.9%	11.3%
12	August 7, 2014	10.6%	13.75	10.3%	11.4%
13	August 13, 2014	11.0%	14.0%	11.5%	13.6%
14	August 14, 2014	11.0%	14.0%	10.7%	12.5%
15	August 20, 2014	11.0%	13.6%	10.6%	11.4%
16	August 21, 2014	11.1%	14.0%	11.1%	12.9%
17	August 27, 2014	10.8%	13.6%	9.9%	11.2%
18	August 28, 2014	12.0%	14.7%	11.5%	12.8%
19	September 3, 2014	10.8%	14.2%	10.1%	11.6%
20	September 4, 2014	10.6%	13.5%	10.5%	11.5%
Average		9.8%	12.2%	9.8%	10.9%

International Broadcast

In India You are My Destiny is aired on Playflix from 23 February 2024. All Episodes Dubbed in Hindi.
