= The Merchant: Gaekju 2015 =

Television series

- Promotional poster
- Also known as: The God of Trade: Gaekju 2015, The God of Commerce: Gaekju 2015, Master of Trade: The Inn 2015
- Genre: Historical
- Based on: Gaekju by Kim Joo-young
- Written by: Jung Sung-hee; Lee Han-ho
- Directed by: Kim Jong-sun
- Starring: Jang Hyuk; Yu Oh-seong; Kim Min-jung; Han Chae-ah; Park Eun-hye; Lee Deok-hwa
- Country of origin: South Korea
- Original language: Korean
- No. of episodes: 41

Production
- Production company: S.M. Culture & Contents

Original release
- Network: KBS2
- Release: September 23, 2015 – February 18, 2016

The Merchant: Gaekju 2015 (Korean: 장사의 신 – 객주 2015; lit. 'Master of Trade: The Innkeeper Merchant 2015') is a South Korean television series based on Gaekju, Kim Joo-young's ten-volume novel which was serialized in daily newspaper Seoul Shinmun from June 1979 to February 1983. It aired on KBS2 on Wednesdays and Thursdays at 21:55 for 41 episodes beginning September 23, 2015.

== Plot ==
In late Joseon, a poor man named Chun Bong-sam inherits a decrepit inn and honestly works his way up to becoming a powerful merchant. As tradesmen clash against the bureaucratic powers that attempt to oppress them by rigging bad deals, Bong-sam never loses sight of his humble beginnings as a peddler even after achieving great success and eventually shapes the way that industry and business are done in his time.

== Cast ==
- Jang Hyuk as Chun Bong-sam
  - Jo Hyun-do as young Bong-sam
- Yu Oh-seong as Gil So-gae
  - Park Gun-woo as young So-gae
- Kim Min-jung as Mae-wol
- Han Chae-ah as Jo So-sa
- Park Eun-hye as Chun So-rye
  - Seo Ji-hee as young So-rye
- Lee Deok-hwa as Shin Seok-ju
- Kim Il-woo as Maeng Gu-beom
- Kim Kyu-chul as Kim Bo-hyun
- Kim Hak-chul as Kim Hak-joon
- Jung Tae-woo as Sun-dol
- Ryu Dam as Gom-bae
- Yang Jung-a as Bang-geum
- Song Young-jae as Mung-gae
- Moon Ga-young as Wol-yi
- Choi Seung-hoon

== Original soundtracks ==
Track listing
| No. | Title | Artist | Length |
|---|---|---|---|
| 1. | "그대만 살아서 (Only You)" | Luna (f(x)) | 4:50 |
| 2. | "단 한 사람 (Because of You)" | Taeil (SM Rookies) | 3:48 |

== Ratings ==
In the table below, the blue numbers represent the lowest ratings and the red numbers represent the highest ratings.

| Episode # | Original broadcast date | Average audience share | | | |
| Episode # | Original broadcast date | TNmS Ratings | | AGB Nielsen | |
| Episode # | Original broadcast date | Nationwide | Seoul National Capital Area | Nationwide | Seoul National Capital Area |
|---|---|---|---|---|---|
| 1 | September 23, 2015 | 5.2% | (<6.7%) | 6.9% | 7.3% |
| 2 | September 24, 2015 | 4.5% | (<7.2%) | 5.9% | 5.8% |
| 3 | September 30, 2015 | 4.1% | 4.0% | 6.0% | 5.8% |
| 4 | October 1, 2015 | 4.3% | (<7.8%) | 6.7% | 6.7% |
| 5 | October 7, 2015 | 6.9% | 7.2% | 7.8% | 8.2% |
| 6 | October 8, 2015 | 7.4% | 7.7% | 9.5% | 10.0% |
| 7 | October 14, 2015 | 8.7% | 9.1% | 11.1% | 11.5% |
| 8 | October 15, 2015 | 8.4% | 9.2% | 10.0% | 9.8% |
| 9 | October 21, 2015 | 8.1% | 9.1% | 9.9% | 10.5% |
| 10 | October 22, 2015 | 8.0% | 8.5% | 10.9% | 11.2% |
| 11 | October 28, 2015 | 8.2% | 8.5% | 10.1% | 9.9% |
| 12 | November 4, 2015 | 7.7% | 8.2% | 11.1% | 11.3% |
| 13 | November 5, 2015 | 7.8% | 8.3% | 10.2% | 10.2% |
| 14 | November 11, 2015 | 7.9% | 8.7% | 11.3% | 11.7% |
| 15 | November 12, 2015 | 9.5% | 10.2% | 12.1% | 11.6% |
| 16 | November 18, 2015 | 8.4% | — | 12.0% | 11.9% |
| 17 | November 19, 2015 | 8.0% | 8.9% | 11.7% | 11.6% |
| 18 | November 25, 2015 | 8.6% | 8.9% | 12.2% | 12.2% |
| 19 | November 26, 2015 | 9.2% | 9.6% | 13.0% | 12.8% |
| 20 | December 2, 2015 | 8.1% | 8.7% | 12.4% | 12.6% |
| 21 | December 3, 2015 | 9.7% | 10.6% | 12.2% | 12.3% |
| 22 | December 9, 2015 | 8.4% | 9.2% | 11.6% | 11.8% |
| 23 | December 10, 2015 | 8.5% | 9.4% | 11.4% | 11.6% |
| 24 | December 16, 2015 | 8.4% | 8.7% | 10.6% | 10.1% |
| 25 | December 17, 2015 | 7.4% | 7.6% | 11.6% | 10.9% |
| 26 | December 23, 2015 | 7.7% | 8.2% | 11.7% | 11.0% |
| 27 | December 24, 2015 | 7.6% | 8.0% | 11.0% | 11.1% |
2016
| 28 | January 6, 2016 | 7.7% | 8.5% | 9.8% | 9.7% |
| 29 | January 7, 2016 | 8.8% | 9.6% | 11.4% | 11.6% |
| 30 | January 13, 2016 | 8.0% | 8.5% | 10.7% | 10.4% |
| 31 | January 14, 2016 | 9.2% | 9.5% | 11.4% | 11.5% |
| 32 | January 20, 2016 | 8.4% | 8.1% | 10.8% | 10.2% |
| 33 | January 21, 2016 | 9.8% | 9.3% | 11.5% | 11.0% |
| 34 | January 27, 2016 | 9.1% | 9.1% | 10.2% | 9.9% |
| 35 | January 28, 2016 | 9.9% | 9.6% | 11.8% | 11.0% |
| 36 | February 3, 2016 | 9.1% | 9.0% | 11.2% | 11.1% |
| 37 | February 4, 2016 | 9.9% | 10.1% | 11.4% | 10.6% |
| 38 | February 10, 2016 | 8.7% | 8.9% | 10.4% | % |
| 39 | February 11, 2016 | 8.4% | 8.5% | 11.1% | 10.4% |
| 40 | February 17, 2016 | 8.5% | 8.5% | 10.4% | 9.7% |
| 41 | February 18, 2016 | 8.8% | 9.4% | 11.2% | 10.9% |

== Awards and nominations ==
| Year | Award | Category | Recipient | Result |
|---|---|---|---|---|
| 2015 | 4th APAN Star Awards | Top Excellence Award, Actor in a Serial Drama | Jang Hyuk | Nominated |
| 2015 | 4th APAN Star Awards | Excellence Award, Actress in a Serial Drama | Kim Min-jung | Won |
| 2015 | 4th APAN Star Awards | Excellence Award, Actress in a Serial Drama | Han Chae-ah | Nominated |
| 2015 | 29th KBS Drama Awards | Excellence Award, Actor in a Mid-length Drama | Jang Hyuk | Won |
| 2015 | 29th KBS Drama Awards | Excellence Award, Actress in a Mid-length Drama | Kim Min-jung | Won |
| 2015 | 29th KBS Drama Awards | Excellence Award, Actress in a Mid-length Drama | Han Chae-ah | Nominated |
| 2015 | 29th KBS Drama Awards | Best Couple Award | Jang Hyuk and Han Chae-ah | Won |

== International broadcast ==
| Country | Network(s)/Station(s) | Series premiere | Title |
|---|---|---|---|
| Thailand | True4U | June 6, 2016 | พ่อค้าเร่แห่งโชซอน (Phor Kha Re Haeng Joseon; lit: "Vendor of Joseon") |
| Indonesia | RTV | July 23, 2016 | Kemenangan Cinta ("Wonder of Joseon") |
