= Jang Na-ra =

South Korean actress and singer (born 1981)

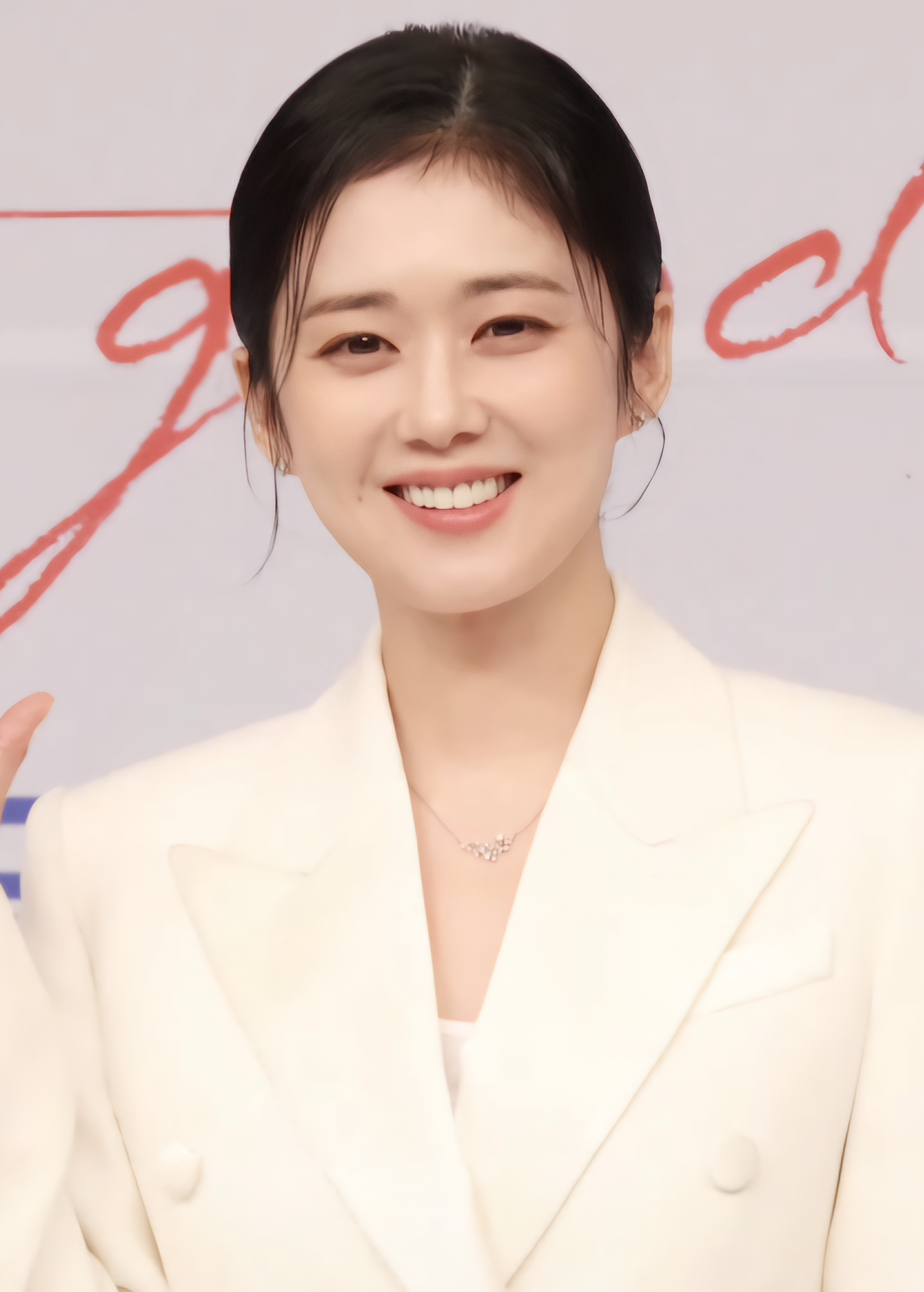
- Jang in July 2024
- Born: March 18, 1981 (age 45); Seoul, South Korea
- Education: Chung-Ang University (BA)
- Occupations: Actress; singer
- Agent: LAELBnc
- Height: 163 cm (5 ft 4 in)
- Spouse: Jung Ha-chul (m. 2022)
- Father: Ju Ho-seong
- Relatives: Jang Sung-won (brother)
- Musical career
- Genre: K-pop
- Instruments: Vocals; flute; piano
- Years active: 2001–present
- Labels: SM; Warner Music Korea

Korean name
- Hangul: 장나라
- RR: Jang Nara
- MR: Chang Nara

Chinese name
- Traditional Chinese: 張娜拉
- Hanyu Pinyin: Zhāng Nàlā
- Website: narajjang.com

Jang Na-ra (Korean: 장나라; born March 18, 1981) is a South Korean actress and singer who has been active in both the South Korean and Chinese entertainment industries since 2001. She first gained wide recognition with her studio album Sweet Dream in 2002, and further rose to prominence for starring in television series Successful Story of a Bright Girl (2002), You Are My Destiny (2014), Hello Monster (2015), Go Back (2017), The Last Empress (2018–2019), VIP (2019), and Good Partner (2024).

== Early life and education ==
Jang was born in 1981 and spent most of her childhood in Yeokchon-dong, Eunpyeong District, in Seoul, South Korea. She appeared with her father, actor Ju Ho-seong (stage name), whose real name is Jang Yeon-gyo, in the play Les Misérables in her primary school days, thus sparking her interest in becoming an actress. Jang also went on to become a model for television advertisements in her high school days before entering Chung-Ang University's Department of Theater, Faculty of Fine Arts, where she majored in Theater and Film in March 2000. She graduated 10 years later, on February 19, 2010. The delay was due to her continuous work since her debut after entering the university. She also received an alumni association award for her contributions to the university during the graduation rites.

== Career ==
=== Music ===
Jang made her debut in the entertainment world as a singer in May 2001. She started her singing career by becoming a trainee and by signing a contract with SM Entertainment. Jang released her debut album First Story with the title track Burying My Face In Tears. Initially, it was not well-received and only reached number 12 on Korean music charts. After starring in the popular sitcom New Nonstop, she became more well-known and released the other tracks in the album, such as her pop ballad style song, Confession and the April Story, which ranked at the top in various music charts. The album sold 300,000 copies. Jang then became a host for MBC's music show, Music Camp and KBS's talk show Love Story. By the end of 2001, she received several New Female Artist awards from year-end Music Awards ceremonies and New MC awards from Entertainment Awards ceremonies.

In October 2002, Jang released her second album, Jjang Nara Vol. 2 Sweet Dream. The song Sweet Dream became immensely popular and reached number 1 on Korean music charts, instantly making Jang a household name. The album also became one of the top-selling albums of that year in South Korea. Due to the success of Sweet Dream, Jang won several awards, including two Daesang awards or the Grand Prize (equivalent to Korean Top Artist of the Year) from MBC Music Festival and KBS Music Awards. She also received the Korean Singer of the Year from China's CCTV-MTV Awards in 2003.

In December 2003, Jang released her third album, aptly titled 3rd Story, which included top tracks I am a Woman Too and Is That True?. Jang released a Best Hits Album in 2004 consisting of songs from her 3 previous albums. She followed it up with her fourth album titled My Story released in December 2004, consisting of hit songs such as I Love School and Winter Diary.

With her popularity in China, she also made a career in music overseas by releasing Chinese-language albums. Her first Chinese album was a huge success, making her the first foreign artist in China with over 1 million copies sold. This was followed by the release of two more Chinese albums, Kungfu (2005) and Flying High (2006). She returned to the Korean music scene in 2007 with her fifth Korean album entitled She, which consists of medium tempo Masquerade and the dance piece, You & I. The following year, she released a multi-lingual album titled Dream of Asia, which includes 26 songs in 5 languages, including Mandarin, Cantonese, Korean, Japanese, and English. Jang held a mini concert in Beijing to promote the album. During the 2008 Beijing Summer Olympics, Jang was the only singer from a non-Chinese-speaking country to appear in the 2008 Olympic song, Beijing Welcomes You.

In 2009, she released a duet with Jimmy Lin for the soundtrack of their film Flying with You. The track was produced by famed Singaporean musician JJ Lin. In 2012, four years after releasing Dream of Asia, Jang returned to the Korean music scene with the digital single I Only Think of You. The same year, she released her fourth Chinese album, Love Journey. On May 20, 2018, Jang Na-Ra performed Sweet Dream, I am a Woman Too, April Story on Sugar Man season 2, which was the highest audience rating among all terrestrial and non-terrestrial programs broadcast at the same time. Sweet Dream by Jang Nara became the most-viewed performing video among all Sugar Man singers.

=== Acting ===
Jang also has a successful acting career. She first appeared in the popular MBC TV sitcom New Nonstop, and received attention for her cute image. In 2002, Jang landed her first leading role in a drama in SBS's romantic comedy Successful Story of a Bright Girl. The drama was well-received and recorded high audience ratings. She won the Best New TV Actress Award at the 2003 Baeksang Arts Awards. The success of the drama and her hit song "Sweet Dream" launched her to stardom in South Korea that year. The same year, she starred in another romantic comedy series, My Love Patzzi, which also attained high ratings.

In 2003, she made her feature film debut in the film Oh! Happy Day. In 2004, she came back to the small screen and starred in MBC's weekend drama Love Is All Around, followed by KBS' romance drama Wedding. Wedding, which established Jang as an actress, and she received viewer acclaim for her portrayal of a woman's growth and identity in marriage. In 2005, with her increasing popularity in China, she made a bold move by moving to China to start her singing and acting career. Her first mainstream Chinese drama was My Bratty Princess. The success of My Bratty Princess catapulted her as a hallyu or Korean Wave star in China. She made several other drama series in China which includes Good Morning Shanghai in 2007, Iron Masked Singer in 2010, and Unruly Qiao in 2011.

In 2009, she returned to the big screen with Sky and Ocean, playing a gifted violinist with the mental age of a 6-year-old, diagnosed with Savant syndrome. The movie was a commercial failure, and was criticized for Jang's unfair nomination at the Grand Bell Awards even before the movie was released. However, despite the controversy, Jang won the Best Actress for a Foreign Film Award at the 19th China Golden Rooster and Hundred Flowers Awards. The film also became the first Asian film to be invited to the eighth Tirana International Film Festival in Albania, where it won the Media Award. In May 2011, Jang starred in the KBS romantic-comedy Baby Faced Beauty. This marked her return to Korean screens after six years. The series averaged 10% ratings throughout its run and won favorable reviews. She later won the Excellence Award for an Actress in a mini-series at the 2011 KBS Drama Awards.

The following year, she filmed her first Chinese movie, Flying With You, starring opposite Taiwanese singer and actor Jimmy Lin. She also made a cameo appearance in another Chinese film starring Jaycee Chan titled Whoever. The same year, she appeared together with her father in a Chinese drama entitled Race Course. In December 2012, Jang reunited with her Baby Faced Beauty co-star Choi Daniel for KBS's teen drama School 2013. She received her second consecutive Excellence Award for an Actress in a mini-series at the 2012 KBS Drama Awards. After filming for School 2013 concluded, Jang immediately returned to China to film a drama titled Red Palanquin.

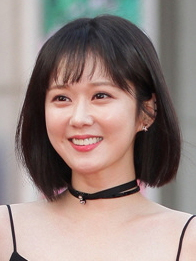
Jang in July 2017

The year 2014 proved to be a busy year for Jang with three TV projects under MBC network. In July 2014, Jang played the lead role in You Are My Destiny, the Korean adaptation of the 2008 Taiwanese hit drama Fated to Love You. This TV series reunited her with Jang Hyuk 12 years after both starred in the highly rated drama Successful Story of a Bright Girl. You Are My Destiny was a hit in China and gained 200 million views. Shortly after, Jang starred in a one-episode drama special entitled Old Farewell for MBC's Drama Festival, pairing her once again with Jang Hyuk. She then took on the lead role opposite Shin Ha-kyun in the fantasy-romantic-comedy drama, Mr. Back. She later won the Top Excellence Award at the 2014 MBC Drama Awards for both television series she starred in that year. In 2015, Jang played a police detective in the mystery thriller Hello Monster. In 2016, she starred in the romantic comedy One More Happy Ending, portraying a former pop idol. In 2017, Jang was cast in the romantic fantasy drama Confession Couple. The series was a success, and won acclaim from viewers. She also won the Excellence Award for an Actress in a mini-series at the 2017 KBS Drama Awards.

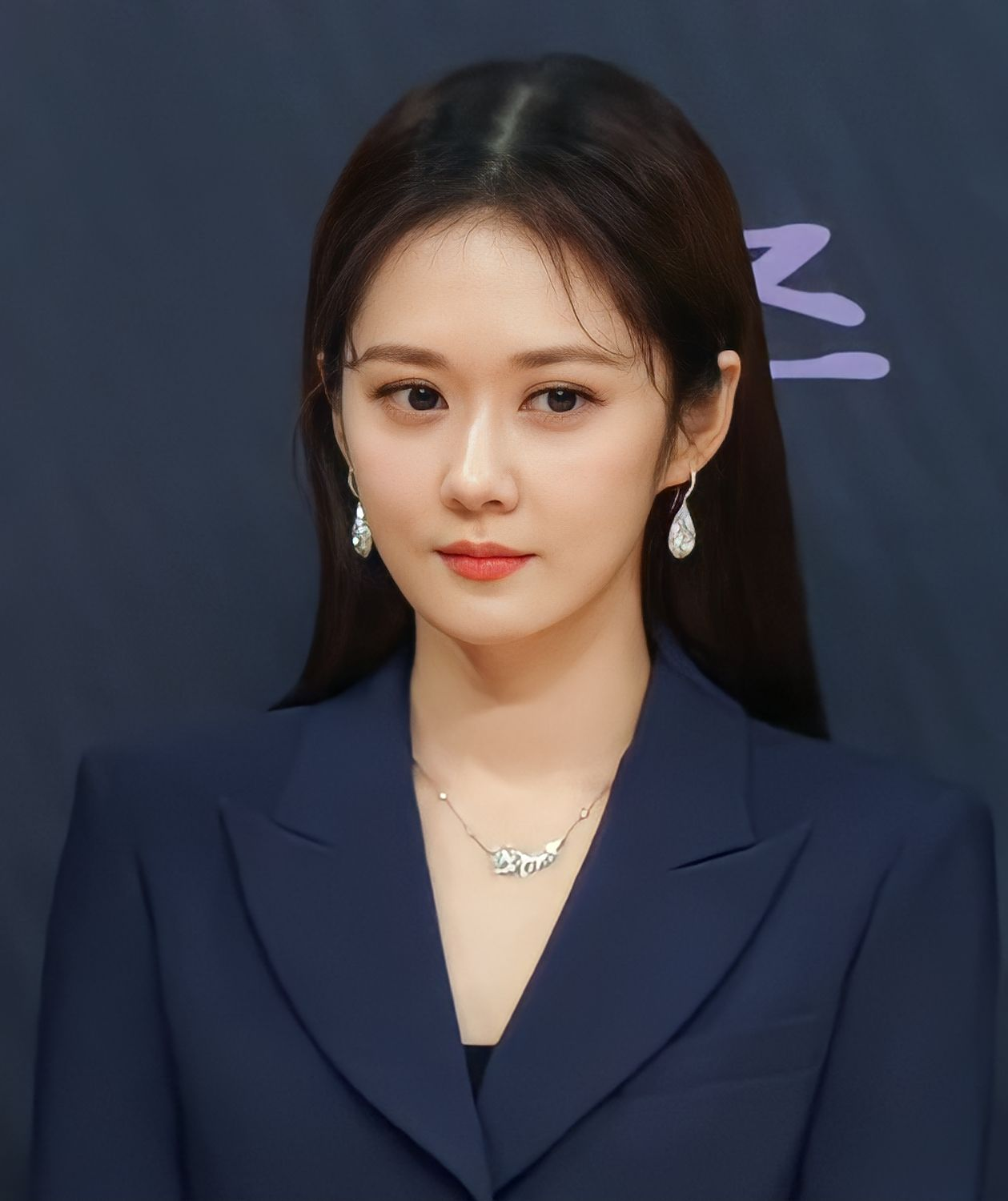
Jang in October 2019

In 2018, Jang was cast in the mystery thriller drama The Last Empress, playing a musical actress who becomes the Empress of a modern-day monarch. The series received high ratings and Jang was praised for her performance with her wide range in acting. In 2019, Jang returned to the small screen with the office mystery drama VIP. She won the Producer Award for her role as Na Jeong-seon at the 2019 SBS Drama Awards. In 2020, Jang starred in the romance comedy drama Oh My Baby as manager of a magazine, The Baby.

In 2021, she appeared in the occult TV series Sell Your Haunted House as Hong Ji-ah, an exorcist and CEO of Daebak Realty, a real estate company which only sells haunted properties. In 2024, Jang won the Grand Prize (Daesang) at the 2024 SBS Drama Awards for her role in Good Partner as Cha Eun-kyung. In 2025, Jang signed with LAELBnc after working for 23 years under her own agency, Rawon Culture.

== Other activities ==
=== Philanthropy ===
Jang does much charity work such as sending 500 million won worth of commodities and 200 million won worth of powdered milk to the hungry North Korean children. She also established a US$10,000 Jang Na-ra scholarship foundation in the Philippines. She also works with the FHI Charity organization. In 2007, Jang held a fund-raising concert for child patients of leukemia in China. The Jang Foundation was established from the money raised during Jang's fan club meeting at her June 9 concert in Beijing, which was held to mark the 15th year of diplomatic relations between China and South Korea. Twelve hundred seats at the concert venue sold out early. After the concert on stage, a Chinese charity organization appointed Jang as a goodwill ambassador, making her the first foreigner to receive such an honor. The same year, she was appointed as one of the goodwill ambassadors for the China-ROK Exchange Year.

In the aftermath of the 2008 Sichuan earthquake, Jang donated 150,000 dollars to a charity organization in China and 8 billion won of clothing for the victims. Jang is also known to contribute her talent in singing for charitable causes. In 2013, she recorded a TV campaign song named "Nanoom Song" for the Community Chest of Korea. She also performed with Jackie Chan at his charity concert "Jackie Chan and his friends" on June 24, 2006, at Nanjing, Jiangsu province of China. In 2015, Jang was recognized for her charity activities by the Ministry of Health and Welfare. In 2017, it was revealed that Jang had secretly donated more than 13 billion won, or close to 12 million US dollars, since her debut in 2001 to various charities, disaster reliefs, and academic organizations. She is also known to have a big affection for animals. Aside from donating money to animal shelters, she also participates at charity events for animal care and volunteers actively for such things as cleaning sick dogs' shelters.

=== Ambassadorship ===
Jang served as the public relations envoy for fair elections in the 2002 South Korean presidential election. She renewed this commitment as she was chosen as one of the honorary public relations ambassadors for the 2017 South Korean presidential election. In 2004, Jang was named public relations envoy for China by the Embassy of China, Seoul. In 2011, Jang was appointed as Seoul's Gangnam District's ambassador to promote tourism in the area.

=== Endorsements ===
In 2002, Jang was named as "CF Queen" by various news outlets. This is due to her rising number of product endorsements ranging from telecommunications (KTF), automobile (Kia Spectra), fashion (SMART uniform), fast food (Popeyes), to alcoholic beverages (잎새주). In March 2020, it was revealed that Jang had signed an exclusive model contract with air purifier brand Clair back in December 2019. It was revealed that Jang would promote Clair's products not only in Korea but throughout Asia as well. Jang signed a contract with Korean cosmetic brand CharmZone as an official model, as revealed in April 2020. This was to promote the company's diversification into the inner beauty market.

=== Academe ===
In June 2010, Jang was appointed as an associate professor at the Beijing Huajia University.

The Filipino novel Revolution: 80 Days (2022) featured a Korean vessel named after Jang Na-ra.

=== Photography ===
In March 2023, it was announced that Jang will hold a photography exhibition, Jang Na-ra Photo Exhibition & Kim Dae-nyeon Special Exhibition, scheduled for April 29 and 30.

== Personal life ==
2002 was Jang's year, with best-selling albums, multiple endorsements, and highly rated TV shows under her belt. Her popularity throughout South Korea is massive, often dubbed as "Jang Na-ra Syndrome". And eventually, her popularity extended to China and other Asian countries. However, her workload took a toll on her health. She disclosed in an interview on Healing Camp, Aren't You Happy that she suffered from gastric ulcers, irritable bowel syndrome, panic disorder, bulimia, and acrophobia due to intense stress and pressure as a celebrity. She also halted her singing activities in 2014 due to stage phobia and focused her work on acting.

Jang belongs to a family of actors. Her father, Ju Ho-seong (real name Jang Yeon-gyo), is a theater actor, producer, and director. He has also been managing Jang's career since her debut. She has her own agency, Rawon Culture, which was established by her father. Jang is also known for her youthful appearance. She is a practicing Christian and has expressed her faith numerous times at the SBS Drama Awards.

=== Marriage ===
On June 3, 2022, Jang announced that she would be marrying her non-celebrity boyfriend. Their private wedding ceremony was held on June 26, 2022. Her husband is a cinematographer who is 6 years younger than her, they first met on the set of the drama VIP (2019).

== Discography ==
=== Korean studio albums ===
Title	Album details	Peak chart positions	Sales
Title	Album details	KOR	Sales
First Story	Released: June 18, 2001; Label: SM Entertainment; Formats: CD, cassette; Track listing: 1. 고백 (Confession); 2. 눈물에 얼굴을 묻는다 (Burying My Face In Tears); 3. 연 (Yun); 4. Make it Right; 5. 물고기자리 (Pisces); 6. 4월이야기 (April Story); 7. 눈물에 얼굴을 묻는다 (Burying My Face In Tears) (String version); 8. Gloomy Sunday; 9. Blue; 10. 약속 (Promise) (with Wheesung); 11. My Pain; 12. 지독한 사랑 (Vicious Love)	7	KOR: 323,168
Sweet Dream	Released: October 2, 2002; Label: SM Entertainment; Formats: CD, cassette; Track listing: 1. Sweet Dream; 2. 아마도사랑이겠죠 (Perhaps Love); 3. 혼자서도 잘해요 (I Can Do It Well By Myself); 4. Pinekiss; 5. 철부지 (A Mere Child); 6. Ending; 7. I'll Be There For You; 8. 뙈지아가 (Pig Baby); 9. 물망초 (A Forget-Me-Not); 10. 사막한가운데서 (In The Middle of the Desert); 11. Snowman; 12. 다시 받아주겠니? (Can You Accept Me Again?); 13. 바람아 멈추어다오 (Please Stop the Wind); 14. 아마도 사랑이겠죠 (Perhaps Love) (Radio edit)	1	KOR: 442,422
3rd Story	Released: December 2, 2003; Label: SM Entertainment; Formats: CD, cassette; Track listing: 1. We; 2. 별이 빛나는 밤에 (Version 2); 3. 기도 (Last Pray); 4. 10년이 지난 후 나는; 5. 그게 정말이니? (Is That True?); 6. 나도 여자랍니다 (I am a Woman Too); 7. 키키; 8. My Boy; 9. 약속; 10. 늘 그래왔듯이; 11. Say Good-Bye; 12. 눈물로 남을텐데; 13. 그게 정말이니 (Band version); 14. 별이 빛나는 밤에	1	KOR: 161,103
My Story (나의 이야기)	Released: December 20, 2004; Label: Warner Music Korea; Formats: CD, cassette; Track listing: 1. Intro; 2. 달팽이 (Snail); 3. 겨울일기 (Winter diary); 4. I Love School; 5. Always; 6. 이젠 괜찮아요 (Now no problem at all); 7. 혹시라도 (Perhaps); 8. 모시는 글 9. 연인 (feat. Shin Hye-sung); 10. 사랑하기 좋은 날 (Good Day to Love); 11. 겨울일기 (Bossanova ver.) (Winter diary); 12. 나 (I); 13. Make it right 14. 飛不起來	8	KOR: 39,791
She	Released: February 21, 2007; Label: Warner Music Korea; Formats: CD, cassette; Track listing: 1. 사랑 부르기 (Calling out love); 2. 마음을 잃다 (Losing one's mind); 3. You & I 4. 손톱 (Fingernails); 5. 가면무도회 (A Masquerade) (feat. Haha); 6. 사랑을 향합니다 (Towards love); 7. Everything for you 8. Tonight; 9. 이젠 말해볼까 (Shall we talk about it now?); 10. 당신의 모든 것을 사랑합니다 (I love everything about you); 11. 사랑 부르기 (Acoustic Ver.)	—	—N/a
Dream of Asia	Released: March 25, 2008; Label: LOEN Entertainment; Formats: CD; Track listing CD 1: 1. 신기루 (Mirage); 2. Jump!!Jump!!; 3. 흉터 (Scar); 4. 미련한 미련이란 것이 (Stupidity What Is Stupidity); 5. Thinkin' Of You; 6. 거짓말쟁이 (Liar); 7. Long Good-Bye; 8. 달맞이 꽃 (Evening Primrose); 9. 눈의 아이 (Snow Child); 10. 결혼할래요; 11. Shining Day; 12. Fairytale [English Version]; 13. 신기루 [Japanese Version]; 14. Jump!!Jump!! [Japanese Version]; 15. We [Japanese Version]; CD 2: 1. 우리들의 꿈 2. 독신주의; 3. 신기루; 4. Jump!!Jump!!; 5. 남은 건 추억뿐; 6. 나를 따라 해 봐 7. 못된 성질; 8. 멈춘 사랑; 9. 조금만; 10. 달빛은 내 마음을 대신해 [Cantonese Version]; 11. 달빛은 내 마음을 대신해 [Mandarin Version]	11	KOR: 5,492*
"—" denotes album did not chart. * Sales data only available through June 2008.

=== Chinese studio albums ===
Title	Album details
One (一张)	Released: January 20, 2005; Track listing: 1. 风儿啊!请你停下来; 2. 全世界下雨; 3. 娜拉In China; 4. 飞不起来; 5. Sweet Dream; 6. 恋爱宣言; 7. 我也是女人; 8. 甜蜜蜜; 9. 可能是爱情; 10. Ends
Gong Fu (功夫)	Released: December 7, 2005; Track listing: 1. 对不起我不爱你; 2. 功夫; 3. 爱上你全部; 4. 我要你崇拜; 5. 梦飞翔; 6. Everyday; 7. 危险恋人; 8. 天边; 9. 出乎预料; 10. 烦着呢
Journey of Love (爱的旅途)	Released: August 2, 2012; Track listing: 1. 愛的出口 Export of Love; 2. 想說給你聽 Want To Say To You; 3. 耍花招 Flashy; 4. 我知道 I Know; 5. 背靠背 Back To Back; 6. 謝謝你給我的幸福 Thank You To My Happiness; 7. 只想起你﹙中﹚I Only Think Of you (Chinese version); 8. 只想起你﹙韓﹚I Only Think Of You (Korean version); 9. 救人哪 Rescue Which; 10. 讓心去流浪 Heart To Stray

=== Collaborative and compilation albums ===
Title	Album details
History My Love	Released: May 4, 2002
Jang Nara and Friends	Released: April 17, 2003; Label: Warner Music Korea; Formats: CD, cassette; Track listing: 1. 오 해피데이; 2. 피노키오; 3. 그날이후; 4. Friend (Solo Version); 5. And (performed by Kim Hyun-jung); 6. Lately (performed by Lee Ki-chan); 7. Will Be Mine (performed by Lee Soo-young); 8. Luv N U (performed by Haha, feat. Lil Wow); 9. Today (performed by Kim Yeong-seok); 10. Friend ( with Lee Ki-chan) # 부디 (performed by The Position ); 11. 그래요 ( performed by Johan Kim) # 아무것도 아닌 이야기 (performed by Sung Si-kyung ); 12. 다시 (performed by Natural+)
Vol. 3: Cheer Up	Released: March 30, 2015
Calling of the Heart – The Second Story Part 2 'Rest'	Released: May 21, 2015; Label: FNC Entertainment

=== Singles ===
Title	Year	Peak chart positions	Album
Title	Year	KOR	Album
As lead artist
"Burying My Face in Tears" (눈물에 얼굴을 묻는다)	2001	—	First Story
"Sweet Dream"	2002	—	Sweet Dream
"Is That True?" (기도, 그게 정말이니?)	2003	—	3rd Story
"Winter Diary"	2004	—	My Story
"Calling Out Love" (사랑부르기)	2007	—	She
"Ladylike"	2007	—	Non-album singles
"Cotton Clouds" (뭉게구름)	2007	—	Non-album singles
"Scar" (흉터)	2008	—	Dream of Asia
"If You Ask Me To"	2008	—	Non-album singles
"Tinker Bell" (팅커벨)	2009	—	Non-album singles
"I Only Think of You" (너만 생각나)	2012	36	Non-album singles
"Love" (사랑)	2013	—	Non-album singles
Soundtrack appearances
"It's Alright"	2008	—	Opposites Attract OST
"Distant Horizon" (천애지아)	2010	79	Dong Yi OST Part 1
"Snowman in May" (오월의 눈사람타이틀) "Orange Tree" (오렌지 나무)	2011	—	Baby Faced Beauty OST Part 1 & 2
"All Day" (하루 종일)	2014	—	Mr. Back OST Part 4
"Someday"	2018	—	Your House Helper OST Part 4
"DayDream" (백일몽)	2021	— (Note: "DayDream" did not enter the Gaon Digital Chart, but it peaked at number 67 on the component Download Chart.)	Sell Your Haunted House OST Part 4
"—" denotes releases that did not chart. The Gaon Music Chart was established in 2010.

== Accolades ==
=== Awards and nominations ===
Name of the award ceremony, year presented, category, nominee of the award, and the result of the nomination
Award ceremony	Year	Category	Nominee / Work	Result	Ref.
APAN Star Awards	2014	Top Excellence Award, Actress in a Miniseries	You Are My Destiny	Nominated	
APAN Star Awards	2018	Excellence Award, Actress in a Miniseries	Confession Couple	Nominated	
APAN Star Awards	2021	Top Excellence Award, Actress in a Miniseries	VIP	Nominated	
Asia Model Awards	2008	Asia Star Award	Jang Na-ra	Won	
Asia-Pacific Music Chart Awards	2005	Asia's Best Female Singer	Jang Na-ra	Won	
Asia-Pacific Music Chart Awards	2005	Award for Outstanding Contribution to Korean-Chinese Cultural Exchange	Jang Na-ra	Won	
Asia-Pacific Music Chart Awards	2005	Top 10 Golden Song	Jang Na-ra	Won	
Baeksang Arts Awards	2003	Best New Actress – Television	Successful Story of a Bright Girl	Won	
Baeksang Arts Awards	2025	Best Actress – Television	Good Partner	Nominated	
CCTV-MTV Music Awards	2003	Korean Singer of the Year	Jang Na-ra	Won	
China Golden Disk Awards	2005	Most Popular Singer	Jang Na-ra	Won	
Culture Day	2008	Today's Young Artist Awards	Jang Na-ra	Won	
China Golden Rooster and Hundred Flowers Awards	2010	Best Actress in a Foreign Film	Sky and Ocean	Won	
Chunsa Film Art Awards	2007	Hallyu Cultural Award	Jang Na-ra	Won	
Chunsa Film Art Awards	2018	Special Achievement Award	Jang Na-ra	Won	
Golden Disk Awards	2001	Best New Artist	First Story	Won	
Golden Disk Awards	2002	Main Prize (Bonsang)	Sweet Dream	Won	
Grand Bell Awards	2009	Best Actress	Sky and Ocean	Nominated	
KBS Drama Awards	2011	Top Excellence Award, Actress	Baby Faced Beauty	Nominated	
KBS Drama Awards	2011	Excellence Award, Actress in a Miniseries	Baby Faced Beauty	Won	
KBS Drama Awards	2011	Netizen Award, Actress	Baby Faced Beauty	Nominated	
KBS Drama Awards	2011	Best Couple Award	Jang Na-ra with Choi Daniel; Baby Faced Beauty	Nominated	
KBS Drama Awards	2012	Top Excellence Award, Actress	School 2013	Nominated	
KBS Drama Awards	2012	Excellence Award, Actress in a Miniseries	School 2013	Won	
KBS Drama Awards	2012	Netizen Award, Actress	School 2013	Nominated	
KBS Drama Awards	2015	Excellence Award, Actress in a Miniseries	Hello Monster	Nominated	
KBS Drama Awards	2015	Netizen Award, Actress	Hello Monster	Nominated	
KBS Drama Awards	2015	Best Couple Award	Jang Na-ra with Seo In-guk; Hello Monster	Nominated	
KBS Drama Awards	2017	Top Excellence Award, Actress	Confession Couple	Nominated	
KBS Drama Awards	2017	Excellence Award, Actress in a Miniseries	Confession Couple	Won	
KBS Drama Awards	2017	Netizen Award, Actress	Confession Couple	Nominated	
KBS Drama Awards	2017	Best Couple Award	Jang Na-ra with Son Ho-jun; Confession Couple	Won	
KBS Drama Awards	2021	Top Excellence Award, Actress	Sell Your Haunted House	Nominated	
KBS Drama Awards	2021	Excellence Award, Actress in a Miniseries	Sell Your Haunted House	Nominated	
KBS Entertainment Awards	2002	Best Newcomer in a Variety Show		Won	
KBS Music Awards	2002	Grand Prize (Daesang) (Note: A Daesang (Korean: 대상), which translates to "Grand Prize", is the highest honor given out at South Korean award ceremonies.)	Sweet Dream	Won	
KMTV Korean Music Awards	2002	KMTV Award	Sweet Dream	Won	
Korea Advertisers Association	2003	Good Model Award	Jang Na-ra	Won	
Korea Drama Awards	2015	Top Excellence Award, Actress	Hello Monster	Nominated	
MBC Drama Awards	2004	Excellence Award, Actress	Love is All Around	Nominated	
MBC Drama Awards	2014	Top Excellence Award, Actress in a Miniseries	You Are My Destiny, Mr. Back	Won	
MBC Drama Awards	2014	Popularity Award, Actress	You Are My Destiny, Mr. Back	Won	
MBC Drama Awards	2014	Best Couple Award	Jang Na-ra with Jang Hyuk; You Are My Destiny	Won	
MBC Drama Awards	2016	Top Excellence Award, Actress in a Miniseries	One More Happy Ending	Nominated	
MBC Music Awards	2001	Best New Artist	First Story	Won	
MBC Music Awards	2002	Grand Prize (Daesang)	Sweet Dream	Won	
MBC Music Awards	2002	Most Popular Artist	Sweet Dream	Won	
Mnet Asian Music Awards	2002	Best Female Artist	Sweet Dream	Won	
Mnet Asian Music Awards	2002	Special Jury Prize	Sweet Dream	Nominated	
Mnet Asian Music Awards	2002	Mobile Popularity Award	Sweet Dream	Won	
Mnet Asian Music Awards	2004	Best Female Artist	Is That True?	Nominated	
SBS Drama Awards	2002	Top 10 Stars	Successful Story of a Bright Girl	Won	
SBS Drama Awards	2018	Top Excellence Award, Actress in a Wednesday-Thursday Drama	The Last Empress	Won	
SBS Drama Awards	2019	Top Excellence Award, Actress in a Miniseries	VIP	Nominated	
SBS Drama Awards	2019	Producer Award	VIP	Won	
SBS Drama Awards	2024	Grand Prize (Daesang)	Good Partner	Won	
SBS Music Awards	2001	Best New Artist	First Story	Won	
Seoul International Drama Awards	2019	Outstanding Korean Actress	The Last Empress	Won	
Seoul Music Awards	2002	Main Prize (Bonsang)	Sweet Dream	Won	
Seoul Tour Awards	2008	Best Korean Star Promoting Seoul Tourism	Jang Na-ra	Won	

=== State honors ===
Name of country, name of award ceremony or organization, year given, and name of honor
Country	Ceremony or Organization	Year	Honor or Award	Ref.
China	Beijing Film Academy	2004	Honorary Master's Degree	
South Korea	Secretary of Defense	2004	Commendation	
South Korea	2008 Culture Day	2008	Today's Young Artist Award (Note: Today's Young Artist Award was established in 1993. It hosted annually by Ministry of Culture, Sports and Tourism on Culture Day. The Ministry of Culture has selected promising young artists in their 20s and 30s by field and awarded the 'Today's Young Artist Award'. The winners receive a cash prize and a plaque from the Minister of Culture.); Popular Art Category	
South Korea	CSR Korea Awards	2009	Special Award (Individual)	
South Korea	60th Anniversary Ceremony of Fisheries Cooperatives	2022	Award plaque promoting seafood consumption	
South Korea	Korean Youth Hope Awards	2023	National Assembly Culture, Sports and Tourism Committee's Commendation	
Switzerland	Inter-Parliamentary Union Award	2005	Social Service	
