= Successful Story of a Bright Girl =

- Genre: Romance; Comedy
- Written by: Lee Hee-myung
- Directed by: Jang Ki-hong
- Starring: Jang Na-ra; Jang Hyuk; Han Eun-jung; Yoon Tae-young; Choo Ja-hyun; Ryu Soo-young
- Country of origin: South Korea
- Original language: Korean
- No. of episodes: 16

Production
- Producer: Song Byung-joon
- Production location: Korea

Original release
- Network: Seoul Broadcasting System
- Release: 13 March – 2 May 2002

Related
- Sunny Girl

Successful Story of a Bright Girl (Korean: 명랑소녀 성공기; RR: Myeongnangsonyeo seonggonggi) is a 2002 South Korean television series starring Jang Na-ra, Jang Hyuk, Han Eun-jung and Ryu Soo-young. It aired on SBS from March 13 to May 2, 2002, on Wednesdays and Thursdays at 21:55 for 16 episodes. The romantic comedy series recorded a peak viewership rating of 42.6%.

== Plot ==
Cha Yang-soon (Jang Na-ra) is a simple girl living in the countryside with her grandmother. She spends most of her time dreaming of someday meeting her Prince Charming; in her fantasy, she saves him from harm with her martial arts skills, and they live happily ever after. Han Gi-tae (Jang Hyuk) is the spoiled and arrogant president of a successful makeup company, Snowy Cosmetics. While in the country on business, Gi-tae goes parachuting and accidentally falls straight into Yang-soon's outdoor bathtub while she is taking a bath, and it's hate at first sight for the two.

Soon, dire circumstances impel Yang-soon to move to the city in search of a job that will allow her to settle her parents' massive financial debts. To earn and save all the money she can, she becomes a maid for a wealthy family and moves into their house. At her new job, she comes face-to-face with Gi-tae, who happens to be one of her employers. At first Yang-soon has trouble adjusting to city life; she gets bullied at school and does not get along with Gi-tae's girlfriend Yoon Na-hee (Han Eun-jung). But she soon makes friends with siblings Song Seok-gu (Yoon Tae-young) and Song Bo-bae (Choo Ja-hyun); Bo-bae becomes her best friend, and Seok-gu seems attracted to her. Also, the short-tempered Gi-tae slowly warms up to her as Yang-soon teaches him a thing or two about manners with her folksy, down-to-earth, no-nonsense approach to life.

But things take a serious turn when Gi-tae, the heir of the family business, finds himself betrayed by a pair of duplicitous family members: his rival and cousin Oh Joon-tae (Ryu Soo-young), and Joon-tae's father. Their behind-the-scenes intrigues lead to Gi-tae's professional downfall. Distraught by the situation and suddenly penniless, Gi-tae has no one to turn to except Yang-soon. She teaches him to stand on his own two feet, and with hard work and creativity, gain back everything he has lost.

== Cast ==
=== Main ===
- Jang Na-ra as Cha Yang-soon
- Jang Hyuk as Han Gi-tae

=== Supporting ===
- Han Eun-jung as Yoon Na-hee
- Ryu Soo-young as Oh Joon-tae
- Yoon Tae-young as Song Seok-gu
- Choo Ja-hyun as Song Bo-bae
- Jung Min as Young-chan, Gi-tae's friend
- Oh Seung-eun as Jin-joo, Na-hee's friend
- Lee Hye-sook as Moon Jung-im, Na-hee's mother
- Hong Yo-seob as Director Oh, Joon-tae's father
- Kwon Hae-hyo as Chief Joo, product development chief
- Choi Yong-min as Chief of public relations
- Lee Seung-hyung as Assistant chief of public relations
- Kim Young-ok as Yang-soon's grandmother
- Park Soon-chun as Yang-soon's mother
- Jo Hyung-ki as Yang-soon's father

== Accolades ==
=== 2002 SBS Drama Awards ===
- Top Excellence Award, Actor: Jang Hyuk
- Top 10 Stars: Jang Na-ra, Jang Hyuk
- New Star Award: Ryu Soo-young, Han Eun-jung

=== 2003 Baeksang Arts Awards ===
- Best New Actress (TV): Jang Na-ra

== Remake ==
A 2011 Taiwanese remake titled Sunny Girl (陽光天使; lit. "Sunshine Angel") starred Rainie Yang and Wu Chun in the lead roles.

An Indonesian remake was titled I Love You, Boss!.
