= Lee Da-hae filmography =

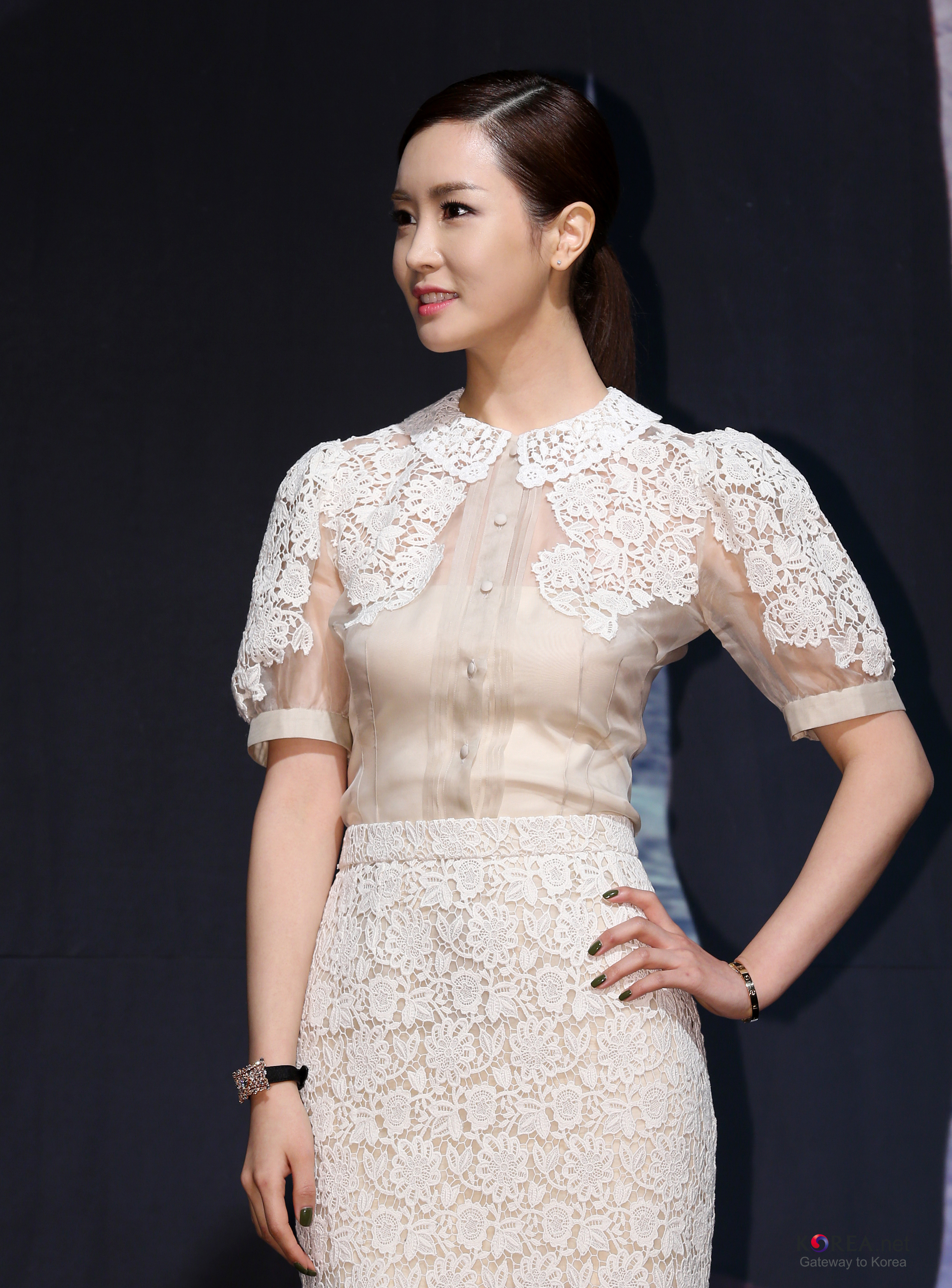
- Lee Da-hae in 2013
- Television series: 21
- Television show: 1
- Hosting: 10
- Music videos: 6

Lee Da-hae (born April 19, 1984) is a South Korean actress.

== Television series ==
Year	Title	Role	Network
2002	Park Jong-cheol, a Fine Young Man	Lee Eun-joo	MBC
2002	Ling Ling	Song Eun-ha	MBC
2003	Good News	TBC	MBC
2004	Sweet 18	Moon Ga-young	KBS2
2004	Star's Echo	Ji-young	MBC / Fuji TV
2004	Lotus Flower Fairy / Heaven's Fate	Yoon Cho-won	MBC
2005	Green Rose	Oh Soo-ah	SBS
2005	My Girl	Joo Yoo-rin	SBS
2007	Hello! Miss	Lee Su-ha	KBS2
2008	Robber	Jin Dal-rae	SBS
2008	East of Eden	Min Hye-rin	MBC
2010	The Slave Hunters	Un-nyun / Kim Hye-won	KBS2
2010	The Fugitive: Plan B	Hye-won (cameo)	KBS2
2010	Haru: An Unforgettable Day in Korea	Screenwriter	TBC
2011	Miss Ripley	Jang Mi-ri	MBC
2012	Love Actually	Wang Xiao Xia	Hunan TV
2013	Iris II: New Generation	Ji Soo-yeon	KBS2
2014	Hotel King	Ah Mo-ne	MBC
2016	Best Lover	Choi Hwan-young	Youku
2018	Nice Witch	Cha Sun-hee / Cha Do-hee	SBS
TBA	My Goddess My Mother	Jiang Jinbo	TBC

== Television show ==
Year	Title	Role	Ref.
2017	Guesthouse Daughters	Permanent cast	
2022	Beauty-FULL	Host	
2024	Men's Life These Days: Groom's Class	Host	

== Music video ==
Year	Song title	Artist
2002	"Someday"	J-Walk
2007	"I Love Rock 'n' Roll" (Korean version)	Lee Da-hae
2008	"Memory"	Kim Bum-soo
2009	"Pas de Deux"	Will Pan
2009	"Today's Horoscope" (오늘의 운세)	Kim Hyung-joong
2010	"I Will Move Away" (비켜줄께)	Brown Eyed Soul

== Hosting ==
Year	Event	Notes
2004	Humming Tree 2004 Music On Concert	
2006	SBS Drama Awards	
2007	Mnet KM Music Festival	
2007	KBS Drama Awards	
2008	50th Anniversary of the Korea-Thailand Festival	Hosted in English
2009	6th Asia Song Festival	Hosted in English
2009	KBS Drama Awards	
2010	6th Mister World Pageant	Hosted in English
2010	KBS Drama Awards	
2011	2nd Seoul Art and Culture Awards	
