= Jong-hyuk =

- Hangul: 종혁
- RR: Jonghyeok
- MR: Chonghyŏk
- IPA: [tɕoŋʝʌk]

Jong-hyuk, also spelled Jong-hyeok or Jong-hyok, is a Korean given name.

People with this name include:

- Lee Jong-hyuk (born 1974), South Korean actor
- Joo Jong-hyuk (actor, born 1983), South Korean actor and singer
- Kim Jong-hyeok (born 1983), South Korean football referee
- Oh Jong-hyuk (born 1983), South Korean singer and actor, member of boy band Click-B
- Choi Jong-hyuk (born 1984), South Korean football player
- Cha Jong-hyok (born 1985), North Korean football player
- Joo Jong-hyuk (actor, born 1991), South Korean actor
- Kim Myoung-jun (born Kim Jong-hyuk, 1994), South Korean football player
- Jeon Jong-hyuk (born 1996), South Korean football player

== See also ==
- List of Korean given names
