= Joo Jong-hyuk =

Joo Jong-hyuk may refer to:

- Joo Jong-hyuk (actor, born 1983), South Korean singer and actor
- Joo Jong-hyuk (actor, born 1991), South Korean actor

== See also ==
- Ju (Korean surname), also spelled Joo or Chu
- Jong-hyuk, a Korean given name
