= Chung-Ang University =

Private university in Seoul, South Korea

- 중앙대학교
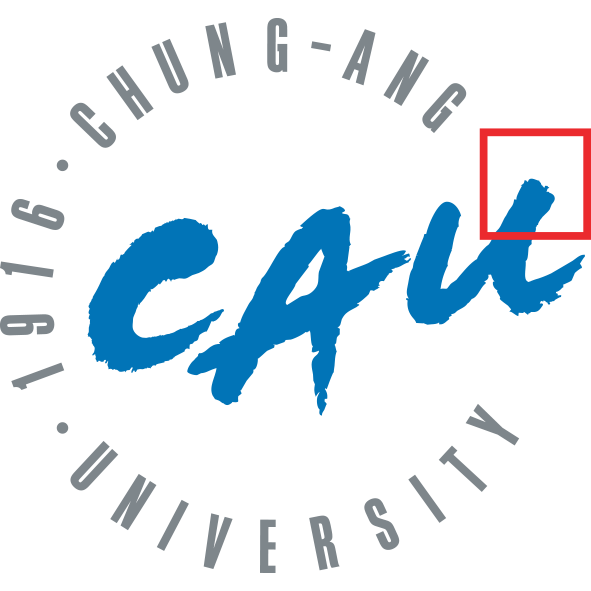
- Emblem of Chung-Ang University
- Other names: CAU, Jungdae, Angdae
- Motto: Live in Truth, Live for Justice
- Type: Private
- Established: 1916; 110 years ago
- President: Park Se-hyeon (박세현)
- Faculty: 2,055
- Students: 21,847
- Undergraduates: 14,506
- Postgraduates: 7,341
- Location: Seoul and Anseong, South Korea
- Campus: Urban
- Newspaper: Jungdae Shinmun
- Colors: CAU blue
- Sporting affiliations: U-League
- Mascot: Dragon
- Website: cau.ac.kr neweng.cau.ac.kr
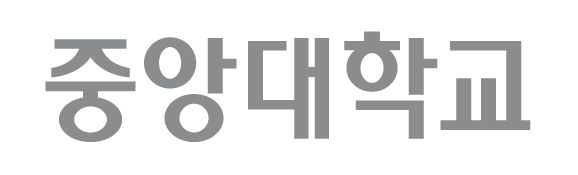

Korean name
- Hangul: 중앙대학교
- Hanja: 中央大學校
- RR: Jungang daehakgyo
- MR: Chungang taehakkyo

Chung-Ang University (CAU; Korean: 중앙대학교) is a private research university in Seoul, South Korea. The university operates two campuses: its main Seoul city campus located in the Dongjak District; and a second campus in Anseong, Gyeonggi Province. Overall, CAU consists of 16 undergraduate colleges and 16 graduate schools.

Founded as a church-run kindergarten in 1916 it transformed into a school for female kindergarten teachers in 1922. CAU was granted university status in 1953 and held its centennial anniversary in 2018. It has more than 33,600 undergraduate students, 5,200 graduate students, 700 professors, and 500 part-time teaching staff. The symbol of the university is a blue dragon.

== History ==
=== Establishment ===
Chung-Ang University began with the establishment of the Chung-Ang Kindergarten as an annex to the Chung-Ang Methodist Church, located in Insa-dong, Seoul. The kindergarten was originally founded in 1916 as a branch of the Jungdong Church, but was separated in April 1918.

The Chung-Ang Kindergarten established a teacher training program and thus took on the role of a professional educational institution, posting graduates to cities across Korea, including Hamhung, Hweryung, Busan, Masan, and Jeonju among others. In 1922, in partnership with the Community Education Movement of Japanese resistance organisations, the institution was promoted to a kindergarten teacher training school, although its official legal status remained as a miscellaneous school.

=== Adversities ===
The institute faced continual financial and personal obstacles, and with just ten students in 1932 it was forced to relocate to a private residence. In 1933 Louise Yim took over the institute's leadership and was appointed as the principal. Her savings of US$30,000 earned from farming, truck driving, and vegetable wholesale operations in the US were used to purchase a site at Heukseok-dong, where a school was built.

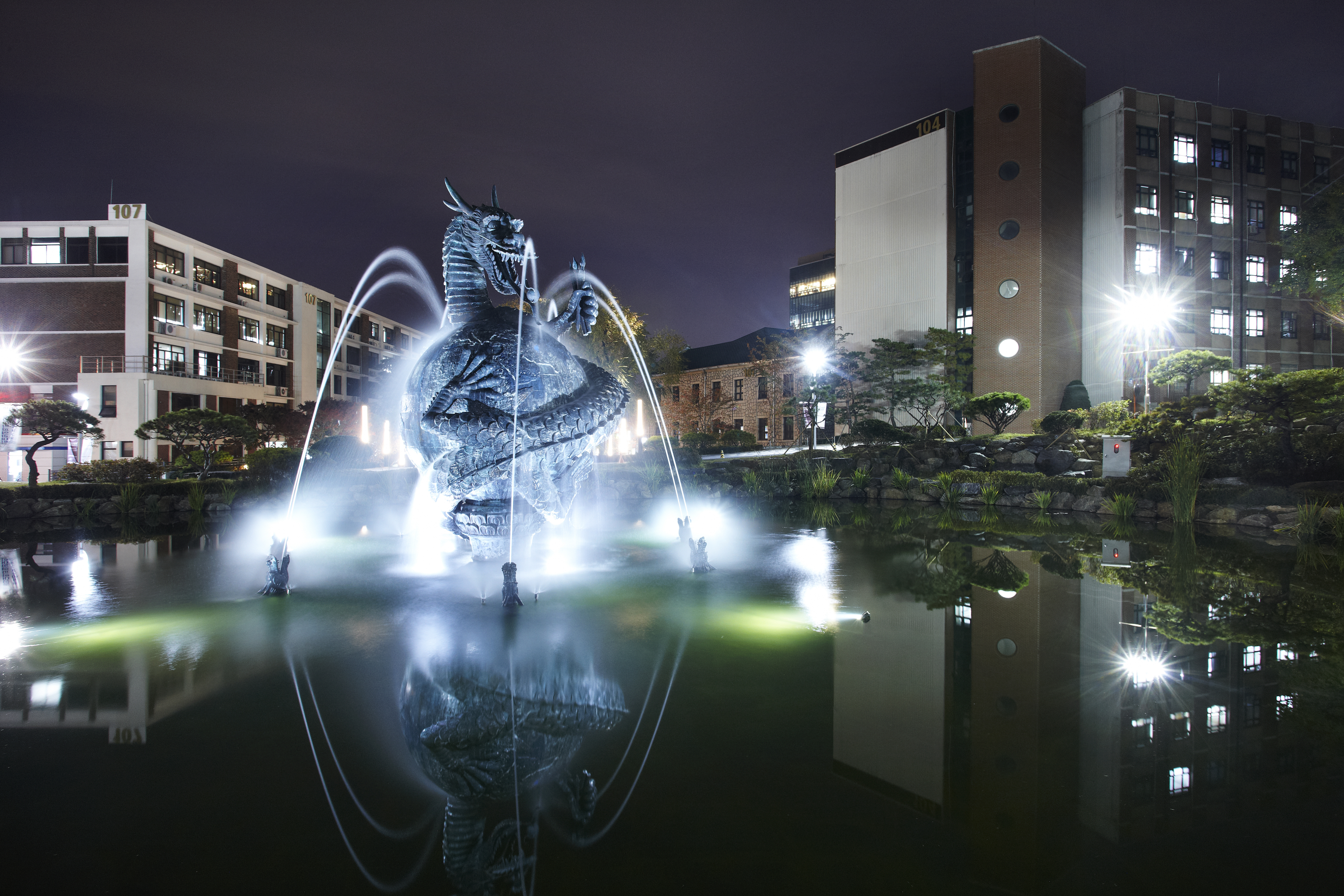
Blue Dragon Pond

Chung-Ang grew significantly under Yim. But despite its relocation to Heukseok-dong the teacher training school still lacked facilities, leading Yim to rent the Pearson Bible School to host classes. However, with Yim's personal financial troubles and the Japanese prohibiting contributions the development of the school continued to face financial difficulties. Believing that the only solution was to raise funds from the United States Yim went there, seeking donations. The result was that she when she returned home to Korea she was able to support the school financially.

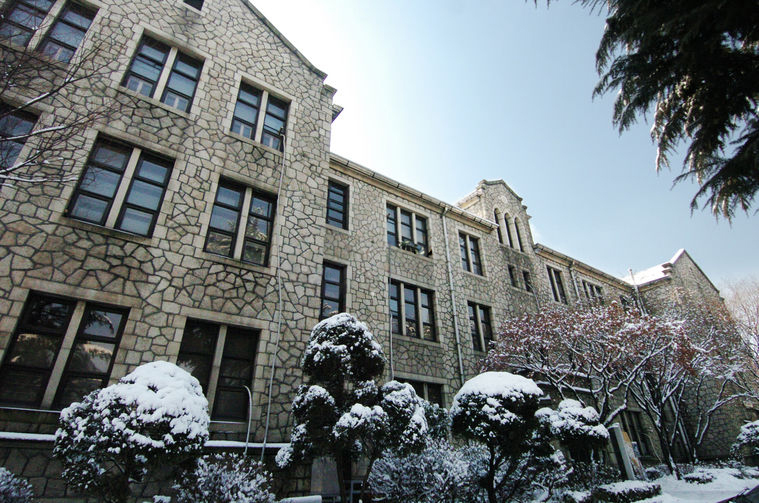
Young-shin Hall

The school's first stone building on the grounds was started in April 1937 and became the Young-Shin Hall upon its completion in May 1938. Students subsequently founded the Chosun Kindergarten Education Society and hosted concerts, plays, and literary activities. During World War II Chung-Ang was heavily targeted by the Japanese because Yim was educated in the United States and was a Christian. Under pressure from Japanese forces towards the end of the war the school was no longer able to admit new students and it was subsequently closed in 1944.

=== Official recognition ===
Following the defeat of Japan and the liberation of Korea, Yim reopened Chung-Ang on 28 September 1945. In October of the same year the Chung-Ang Teacher Training School was re-organised under the name of the Chung-Ang Professional School for Women. In April 1947 the school was again reorganised into the Chung-Ang College for Women and then in May 1948 to the Chung-Ang College, establishing itself as a co-educational institution. Yim continued her efforts in developing the college while serving as a Korean diplomat in the United Nations, and was appointed dean and chairman of the board.

Though the college celebrated its first conferment of a bachelor's degree in May 1950 it was again closed indefinitely due to the outbreak of the Korean War. The school's management and students fled to Busan where a temporary office was established and the Chung-Ang College continued operating for the duration of the war. The college was granted official university status in February 1953 and Yim was appointed as first chancellor of the university.

Following the declaration of a ceasefire in July 1953 the university's management and teaching faculty returned to the original site in Heukseok-dong, Seoul. However, the site was occupied by the U.S. Army and so lectures had to be taught in temporary buildings until the site was eventually recovered in April 1954.

=== Expansion ===
The university continued to expand and by 1959 it encompassed 19 educational departments under four faculties with a student population of over 2,000. The university also established the International Culture Research Institute in an effort to enhance research activities. In 1960 CAU students protested against the March 1960 South Korean presidential election, and on 2 October 1961 Sung-Hee Yim was appointed as CAU's second chancellor. He was later re-elected as the third chancellor.

The university, together with its subsidiaries and affiliated schools, underwent a significant reorganisation in 1965 in an effort to develop a unified kindergarten-to-graduation education under the CAU name. In 1968 the university was reorganised once again, this time into eight component faculties, and celebrated its 50th anniversary the same year. Chull Soon Yim became the university's fourth chancellor.

Louise Yim died on 17 February 1977.

Dormitory on Anseong campus

Another expansion in March 1980 saw lecture halls, dormitories, and a students' union built in Anseong, thereby establishing the Anseong campus.

Chull Soon Yim ended his term as the fourth chancellor in May 1980 and was succeeded by the professor of philosophy, Suk-Hee Lee, who became the fifth chancellor. During his tenure Lee oversaw significant improvements and modernisations of both the Seoul and Anseong campuses.

Blue Dragon Pond on Anseong campus

=== Recent history ===
Bum Hoon Park was inaugurated as the 12th university president in February 2005. His first major responsibility was overseeing the evaluation conducted by the Korean Council for University Education, as well as initiatives involving capital marketing, the BK21 project, the establishment of the Professional Graduate School of Law, and other national programs.

Following the restructuring of undergraduate programs the university conducted a comprehensive review of new student admissions, current student registration, financial status, and overall management of its three professional schools and eleven specialised schools, seeking to identify areas for improvement and enhance the quality of education. Consequently, 32 of the 42 faculty members in the professional and specialised schools were reassigned to the general graduate school and 10 positions were eliminated, with the reassigned faculty members forming the core of a newly established Research Priority Group.

The development plan known as DRAGON 2018 (for 2001–2004) initiated under the 11th president to guide the university toward its centennial vision was rebranded as CAU2018+ (for 2005–2008). The new plan was executed in two phases to achieve its strategic goals, and included detailed valuation indices for various sectors and outlined projected revenue sources. Between 2005 and 2009 the university secured KRW 40 billion in development funds, KRW 166.3 billion in external research grants, and KRW 17.3 billion in government funding. The total of KRW 223.6 billion represented the largest amount of financial support in the university's history.

During the first four years of Park's presidency significant investments were made in educational and research infrastructure. In February 2007 the nation's largest Law Hall was completed, and a master plan was developed for constructing Pharmacy and Natural Sciences R&D Centers near the main entrance of Campus 1, plus an Engineering R&D Center adjacent to the gymnasium.

In November 2007 the university obtained approval for the development of a tertiary campus in Hanam on the site of the former Camp Colbern, a U.S. Army installation. With an area of 86,000 pyeong the site was redeveloped for academic use, with dedicated teams organised by subject area. 244 full-time teaching staff were recruited between 2005 and 2009, and 25 full-time and part-time staff in the first semester of 2009. The Law and Medical Schools were established there in March 2009.

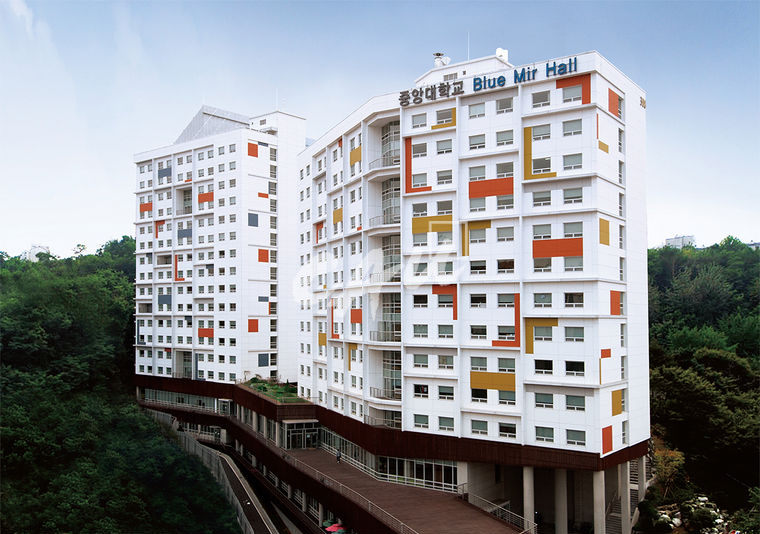
Blue Mir Hall (student dormitory)

In May 2008 the global corporation Doosan Group became the university's educational foundation and Yong-Sung Park was elected as the ninth chairman of the board. Chairman Park had led Doosan's transition from consumer goods to heavy industry and symbolised a new era for the university. On August 27, 2008 he met with faculty to present the CAU2018+ Mid-Term Development Plans and a new strategic direction, summarised as "Choice and Concentration, Strengthening Executive Capability, and Establishing a Virtuous Cycle Structure." The direct election system for the university presidency was abolished and replaced with an appointment system, resulting in President Park being reappointed as the 13th president.

As of February 2009 Chung-Ang University had developed into a comprehensive institution comprising one general graduate school, five professional graduate schools, eleven specialised graduate schools, and eighteen modularized colleges across campuses in Seoul and Anseong. The university had conferred a total of 147,196 bachelor's degrees, 29,940 master's degrees, and 4,275 doctoral degrees.

In March 2014, Chung-Ang University began accepting competitive video game players into its Department of Sport Science, reflecting a broad embrace of emerging disciplines.

== Academic structure and statistics ==
=== Colleges and schools ===
The faculty-based system was replaced by a vice presidential system in 2014, with each college operated by its respective dean. As of 2014 there are 12 colleges and 49 departments.

Colleges	Departments and schools
Law	• Central Law School (Graduate)
Humanities	• Philosophy • History • Korean Language and Literature • English Language and Literature • European Languages and Cultures • Asian Languages and Cultures
Social Sciences	• Political Science and International Relations • Public Service • Media Communication • Sociology • Psychology • Social Welfare • Library and Information Science • Urban Planning and Real Estate
Education	• Education • Early Childhood Education • English Education • Home Economics Education • Physical Education
Natural Sciences	• Physics • Chemistry • Life Sciences • Mathematics
Biotechnology and Natural Resources	• Bioresource and Bioscience (Anseong) • Food Science and Technology (Anseong) • Systems Biotechnology (Anseong)
Engineering	• Civil and Environmental Engineering, Urban Design and Studies • Architecture and Building Science • Chemical Engineering and Material Science • Mechanical Engineering • Electrical and Electronics Engineering • Integrative Engineering • Energy System Engineering • Advanced Materials Engineering (Anseong)
Software	• Computer Science and Engineering • Artificial Intelligence (AI)
Business and Economics	• Business Administration • Global Finance • Economics • Applied Statistics • Advertising and Public Relations • International Logistics • Industrial Security • Knowledge-Based Management
Pharmacy	• Pharmacy
Medicine	• Medicine
Nursing	• Nursing
Arts	Performance Film Creation (Seoul/Anseong); Creative Writing (Anseong); Theatre; Film Studies; Photography and Related Media (Anseong); Dance (Anseong); Theatre and Film Design; Art (Anseong); Korean Painting; Painting; Sculpture; Design (Anseong); Visual Communication Design; Industrial Design; Fashion Design; Housing and Interior Design; Crafts; Music (Anseong); Composition; Voice; Piano; Orchestral Music; Traditional Arts (Anseong); Korean Music; Performing Arts
Art & Technology	• Art & Technology (Anseong)
Sports	• Sports Science (Anseong)

=== Postgraduate programs ===
The postgraduate programmes in Chung-Ang University are categorised into general graduate schools, professional schools, and specialised graduate schools.

Category	General Graduate School
Professional	• International Studies • Advanced Imaging Science, Multimedia and Film • Business School • Medical School • Law School
Specialized	• Social Development • Education • Media Communication • Construction Engineering • Public Administration • Industrial and Entrepreneurial Management • Information • Food & Drug Administration • Arts • Korean Traditional Music Education • Human Resource Development • Nursing and Health Professions

=== International students ===
The total international student population at Chung-Ang University is approximately 2,000, with approximately 200 exchange students admitted per year.

Faculties	Admissions ratio (%)
Humanities	7.11
Social Science	5.9
Natural Science	6
Engineering	7.02
Education	5.56
Business and Economics	5.89

=== Admissions ===
The admissions ratio at Chung-Ang University is 7.45% based on 2014 statistics: 73,021 applicants for 5,443 places.

Statistics, 2014
	Applications received	Offers of admission	Selectivity
Business and Economics	9,848	712	7.2%
Humanities and Social sciences	18,425	819	4.4%
Natural Science and Engineering	18,662	940	5.0%
Medicine	3,278	60	1.8%
Nursing	3,066	340	11.0%
Arts/Sports	12,986	1,568	12.1%

=== Rankings ===
University rankings
JoongAng National	Domestic	=10
QS National	General	13
THE National	General	12–13
ARWU National	Research	19–23
QS Asia (Asia version)	General	73
THE Asia (Asia version)	General	81
USNWR Asia	General	334
ARWU World	Research	701–800
QS World	General	479
THE World	General	401–500
USNWR World	General	=1048

In the 2020 Times Higher Education (THE) University Rankings, CAU ranked third among Korean universities in the category of social sciences and fifth in education.

According to the 2019 Korea University Rankings by JoongAng Ilbo, CAU ranked first in the fields of film, drama, and theatre studies.

== Campuses ==
=== Seoul campus ===
The Libraries: Chung-Ang University is home to the Central Library and the Law Library. Renovation work to the Central Library was completed in August 2009, thereby increasing its capacity to 3,400 personal cubicles plus new study rooms, tutoring rooms, an E-Lounge, and CAU-Garden, and providing access to electronic newspapers, noticeboards, and memo boards over a 14,258.2 m^{2} (4,320 pyeong) site. Overall, the Central Library houses over a million books and articles, 2,500 other publications, 80,000 electronic journals, access to 120 web data sites, all dissertations published by university graduates, and 40,000 copies of e-books.

The Law Library is on the first and second floors of the Law Building and houses volumes, reference books, periodicals, and all domestic and foreign data.

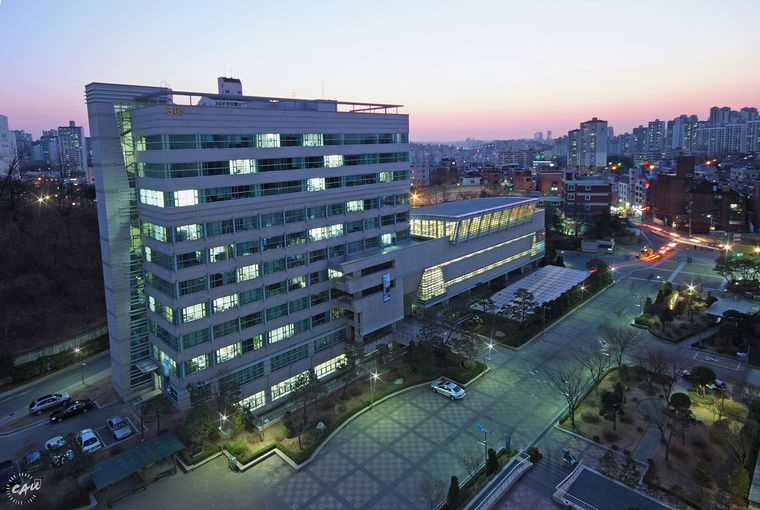
Professor Office Building and Gymnasium

The Main Administration Building is a white building visible after passing the Middle Entrance and contains the offices of the President, Student Affairs, General Affairs, and Public Relations. Emancipation Square is in the center of the university and is sheltered by Seorabol Hall, the Central Library, and the Student Union Hall. It is used by students seeking relaxation as well as during festivities.

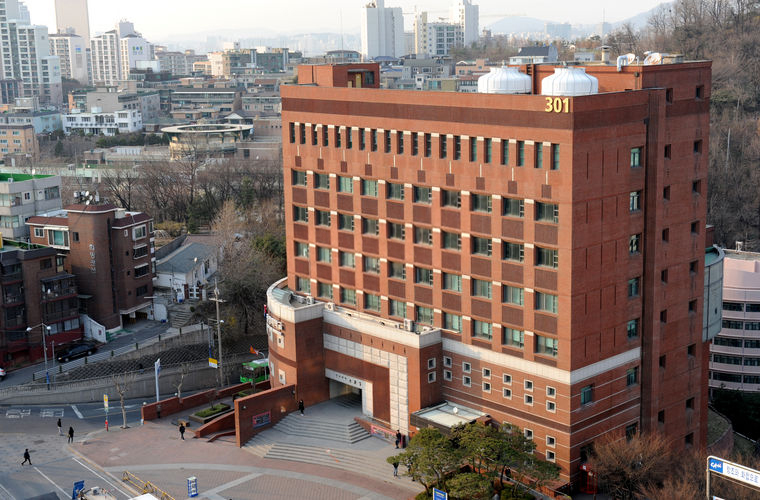
Art Center

The Blue Dragon Monument and Blue Dragon Pond are near the Middle Entrance and were installed in 1968 to commemorate the university's 50th anniversary. The Blue Dragon Monument depicts the moment of the dragon's ascension from the Earth's embrace, with the blessing of seven miniature dragons, and is symbolic of the prosperity of Chung-Ang University. Young-Shin Hall is situated by the Main Entrance and was completed in May 1938.

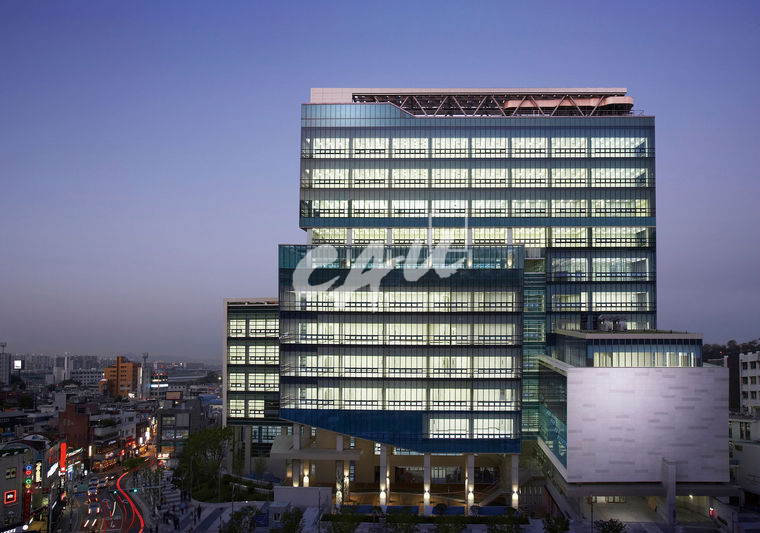
College of Pharmacy and R&D Center

The College Buildings include the College of Law (Law Building), Seorabol Hall, Bobst Hall, Pfeiffer Hall, College of Natural Science (Natural Science Building), College of Medicine (Medical Building), College of Pharmacy (Pharmacy Building), and the Institute of Performing Arts.

The College of Law Building was constructed in 2007 and is shared by the School of Business Administration, College of Education, and the College of Law. Facilities include student and staff cafeterias, computer rooms, the Law Library, an assembly hall, and postgraduate rooms.

Blue Mir Hall was constructed in August 2010. It can accommodate 955 students and is equipped with restaurants, convenience stores, sports facilities, and cafes.

Seorabol Hall is an eight-story building across from the College of Law and is home to the College of Liberal Arts and College of Education.

Bobst Hall is behind the Student Cultural Hall and was the first of two Engineering Buildings. Furnished with labs and research space, it is mainly used by students of Mechanical Engineering, Electrical and Electronics Engineering, and Chemical Engineering.

Engineering Building 2 supplements the first Engineering Building and its computer and design labs are mainly used by students of Architectural Engineering and Computer Science and Engineering.

The Natural Science Building is constructed of distinctive red bricks and houses the Departments of Physics, Chemistry, Life Science, and Math Statistics.

The Medical Buildings 1 & 2 are spread over two sites near the Student Union Hall and the Central Library.

Pfeiffer Hall and R&D Center houses the College of Pharmacy and has an array of laboratories.

The Art Center building, also known as the Media & Performance Theatre, houses the School of Mass Communication and School of Drama and Film Studies. University functions and performances are held in its halls.

The Gymnasium is located by the back entrance alongside the Professor Research Center and hosts the Career Fair each term.

=== Anseong campus ===
The Anseong Campus is located in Daedeok-myeon, Anseong-si, Gyeonggi-do. This secondary campus was established in 1979, subsequent to the recognition of Chung-Ang as a university in 1948.

The College of Arts Precinct is made up of the Modelling Hall, Theatre, Crafts Hall, and Sculpture Hall. The College of Arts teaches ten art genres from literature, sculpture, and performance, through to visual design. Lectures are open to students in Creative Writing, Korean Painting, Western Painting, Arts & Crafts, Photography, Dance, Sculpture, and Industrial Design.

The School of Music Precinct is made up of Music Building 1, Music Building 2, and Young-Shin Music Hall, mainly used by students of Composition, Voice, Piano, and Orchestral Instruments.

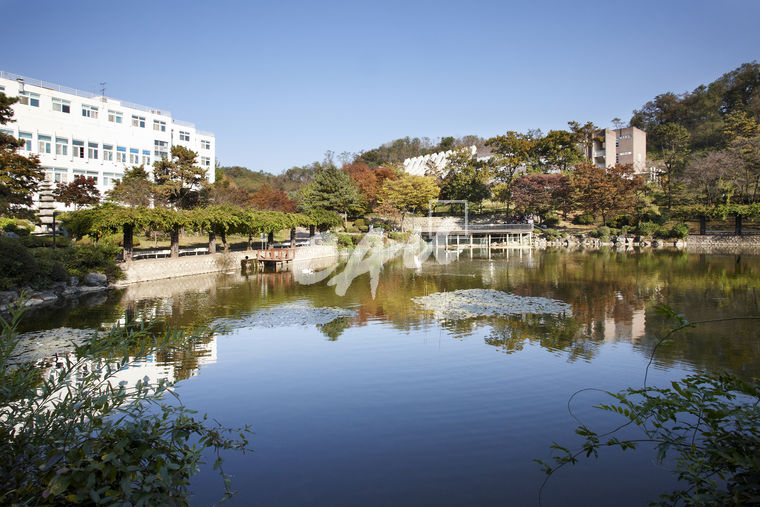
CAU Blue Dragon Pond

The Korean Traditional Music Building is down the path between the Music Buildings and the Young-Shin Music Hall, and all of its areas are open to the public. The theatre and lobby are on the second floor in a gallery formation, and on the third floor private practice rooms are available to students.

The Lakeside Theatre is a stage erected at the side of a lake and serves as an open-air arena for summer performances. The surrounding garden contains trees and benches.

The College of Biotechnology & Natural Resources Precinct is made up of the Circular building (Won hyung gwan), Biotechnology building 1, Biotechnology building 2, Biotechnology building 3, and a Living Modified Organisms Laboratory.

== Student clubs ==
Classification	Student clubs
Performing Arts	M&M, DaCside, Dance Sports, 새날지기, 영죽무대, 청룡합창단, 타박네, 가람터, 누리울림, 루바토, 멜로스, Muse, Blue Dragon, 피카통
Liberal Arts	UNSA, 미생마, YOUTHHOSTEL, KUSA
Cultural Studies	만화두레, 문학동인회, Art Time, 반영, Photography, Calligraphy
Charity	MRA, RCY, 사랑터, 손짓사랑, 푸름회(Purm Society; Education Charity)
Social Studies	비꼼, 현상스케치, Humanism
Tradition/Custom/Heritage	민탈, 소래얼, 한백사위
Religious	CARP, Catholic Society, Buddhist Society, Jeungism Society, CAM, CBA, CCC, CUSCM, SCA, UBF, Navigators
Sports	CABO, LOVE4T, Rendezvous, 리베로, American Football, Giants, 날파람, Body Building Society, 의혈검, Judo, Kendo, 라이너스, Mountain Hiking, Ski, Underwater Diving, Yachting
Academic	CECOM, COMP, HAM, TRC, Cosmos

== Healthcare system ==
Chung-Ang University Healthcare System (CAUHS) runs two hospitals in Seoul and Gwangmyeong which provide healthcare to the residents of the Seoul Metropolitan Area.

Chung-Ang University Hospital was founded in 1968 as the first domestic association of medical school professors and moved from Pil-dong to Heukseok-dong in 2004. In 2011, after 27 years of operation, Yongsan Hospital relocated to merge with Chung-Ang University Hospital.

In March 2022 CAUHS opened Chung-Ang University Gwangmyeong Hospital, its fourth hospital.

== Notable alumni ==
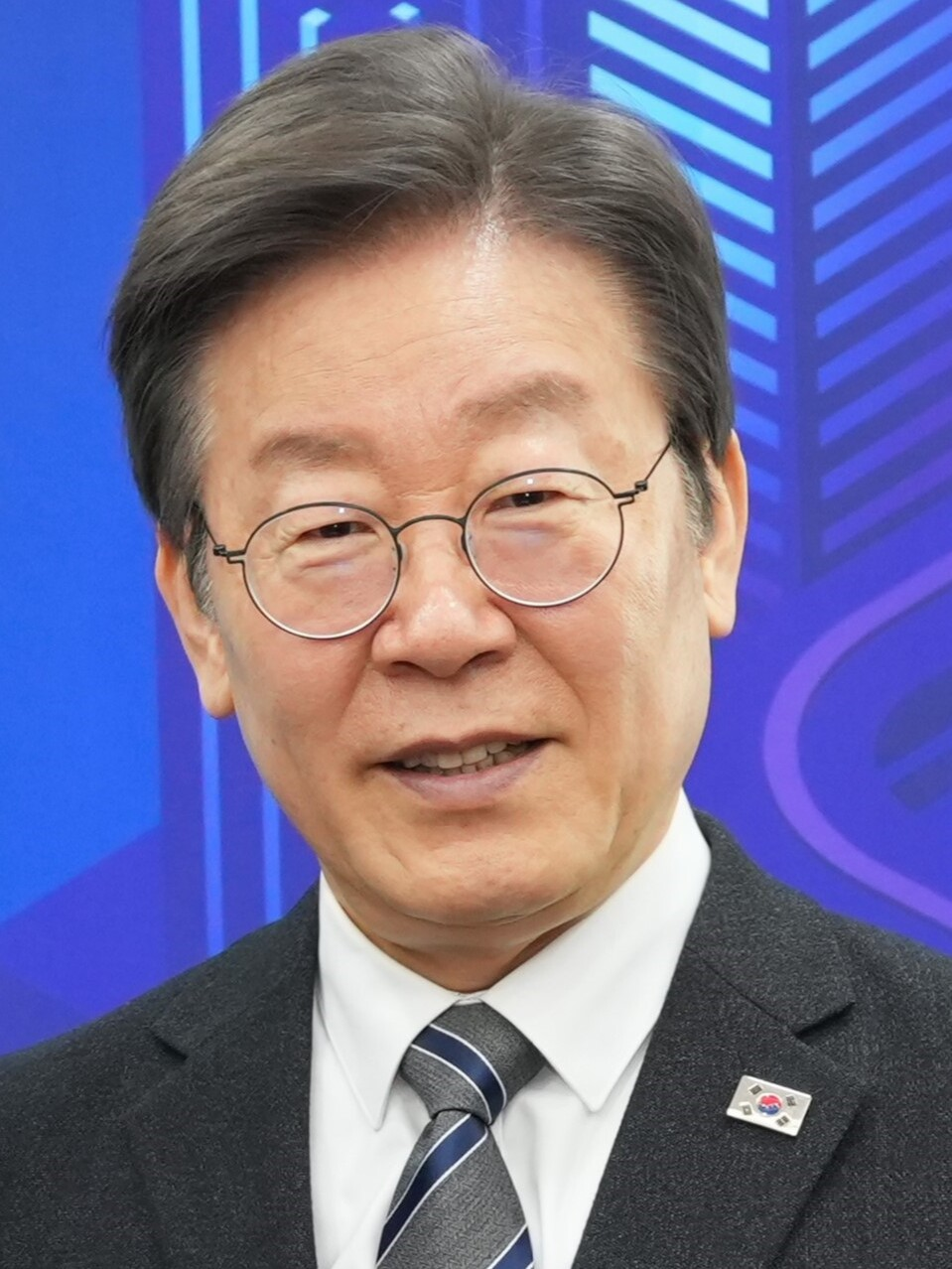
President of South Korea, Lee Jae-Myung

=== Politicians ===
- Auh June-sun (어준선)
- Chang Je-won (장제원)
- Jung Choun-sook (정춘숙)
- Kim Nam-kuk (김남국)
- Koo Yun-cheol (구윤철)
- Kweon Seong-dong (권성동)
- Lee Baek-yun (이백윤)
- Lee Jae-myung (이재명)
- Noh Woong-rae (노웅래)

=== Music industry ===
- Han Sung-soo (한성수)

=== Musicians ===
- Cao Lu (曹璐) (Fiestar)
- Hong Yoo-kyung (홍유경) (Apink)
- Jeon So-yeon (전소연) (I-dle)
- Joo Jong-hyuk (라이언) (Paran)
- Kim Jeong-hoon (김정훈) (UN)
- Kwon Yuri (유리) (Girls' Generation)
- Luna (루나) (f(x))
- Park Inyoung (박인영)
- Park Ji-hoon (박지훈) (Wanna One)
- Park Si-eun (박시은) (STAYC)
- Shin Dongho (신동호) (U-KISS)
- Shin Sung-woo (신성우)
- Sooyoung (수영) (Girls' Generation)
- Yooyoung (유영) (Hello Venus)
- Yuny Han (한태윤)

=== Film industry ===
- Ahn In-sook (안인숙)
- Bae Jong-ok (배종옥)
- Baek Seung-hyeon (백승욱)
- Baek Sung-hyun (백성현)
- Baek Yoon-sik (백윤식)
- Bang Eun-jin (방은진)
- Cha Tae Hyun (차태현)
- Cho Jae-hyun (조재현)
- Cho Jung-rae (조정래)
- Choi Jin-sil (최진실)
- Choi Jung-yoon (최정윤)
- Choi Ran (최란)
- Choi Ri (최리)
- Choi Tae-joon (최태준)
- Choi Woo-hyuk (최우혁)
- Choi Woo-shik (최우식)
- Go Ara (고아라)
- Go Won-hee (고원희)
- Gong Hyung-jin (공형진)
- Gu Won (구원)
- Ha Jung-woo (하정우)
- Han Ji-wan (한지완)
- Hong In-young (홍인영)
- Hong Sang-soo (홍상수)
- Hong Seo-young (홍서영)
- Hong Yo-seob (홍요섭)
- Hyun Bin (현빈)
- Im Chang-jung (임창정)
- Im Ho (임호)
- Im Hyuk (임혁)
- Im Soo-hyang (임수향)
- Jang Na-ra (장나라)
- Jang Shin-young (장신영)
- Jeon In-hwa (전인화)
- Jeon Ye-seo (전예서)
- Jeong Bo-seok (정보석)
- Jin Ki-joo (진기주)
- Jin Se-yeon (진세연)
- Jo An (조안)
- Jo Hye-joo (조혜주)
- Jo Min-ki (조민기)
- Joo Da-young (주다영)
- Joo Jin-mo (박진태)
- Joo Jong-hyuk (라이언)
- Jung Jae-kwang (정재광)
- Jung Ho-keun (정호근)
- Jung Kyung-ho (정경호)
- Jung Min-ah (정민아)
- Kang Han-na (강한나)
- Kang Ha-neul (강하늘)
- Kim Bum (김범)
- Kim Byung-ki (김병기)
- Kim Dae-seung (김대승)
- Kim Do-hoon (김도훈)
- Kim Gyu-ri (김규리)
- Kim Hee-ae (김희애)
- Kim Hee-jung (김희정)
- Kim Hee-jung (김희정)
- Kim Hee-sun (김희선)
- Kim Ho-jin (김호진)
- Kim Hye-ok (김혜옥)
- Kim Hyun-soo (김현수)
- Kim Il-woo (김일우)
- Kim Jae-won (김재원)
- Kim Jeong-hoon (김정훈)
- Kim Ji-min (김지민)
- Kim Ju-yeong (김주영)
- Kim Kang-woo (김상우)
- Kim Min-jae (김민재)
- Kim Min-ji (서민지)
- Kim Rae-won (김래원)
- Kim Sae-ron (김새론)
- Kim Sang-kyung (김상경)
- Kim So-eun (김소은)
- Kim So-jin (김소진)
- Kim Soo-hyun (김수현)
- Kim Su-hyeon (김수현)
- Kim Tae-woo (김태우)
- Kim Ye-won (김예원)
- Kim Young-jae (김영재)
- Ko So-young (고소영)
- Kwak Hee-sung (곽희성)
- Kwak Ji-min (곽지민)
- Kwon Yul (권율)
- Lee Beom-soo (이범수)
- Lee Byung-hun (이병헌)
- Lee Do-hyun (이도현)
- Lee Han-wi (이한위)
- Lee Hye-young (이혜영)
- Lee Hyun-jin (이현진)
- Lee In (이준)
- Lee Jae-ryong (이재룡)
- Lee Jae-wook (이재욱)
- Lee Jung-hyun (이정현)
- Lee Min-woo (이동민)
- Lee Tae-ri (이태리)
- Lee Yoon-ji (이윤지)
- Lee Young-ae (이영애)
- Lee Young-ha (이영하)
- Lim Eun-kyung (임은경)
- Nam Da-reum (남다름)
- Nam Mi-jung (남미정)
- Namkoong Min (남궁민)
- Oh Dae-gyu (오대규)
- Oh Hyun-kyung (오현경)
- Oh Se-young (오세영)
- Park Chul-min (박철민)
- Park Geun-hyung (박근형)
- Park Gun-woo (박건우)
- Park Ho-san (박호산)
- Park In-hwan (박인환)
- Park Joong-hoon (박중훈)
- Park Jung-chul (박정철)
- Park Shin-hye (박신혜)
- Park Ye-jin (박예진)
- Park Yong-ha (박용하)
- Park Yong-woo (박용우)
- Ryu Deok-hwan (류덕환)
- Seo Young (서영)
- Shin Ae-ra (신애라)
- Shin Se-kyung (신세경)
- Shin Sung-woo (신성우)
- Son Chang-min (손창민)
- Son Hyun-joo (손현주)
- Song Il-gook (송일국)
- Song Jae-rim (송재림)
- Song Ok-sook (송옥숙)
- Sung Yoo-bin (성유빈)
- Song Young-chang (송영창)
- Tang Jun-sang (탕준상)
- Wang Bit-na (왕빛나)
- Woo Seung-yeon (우승연)
- Yeo Hyun-soo (여현수)
- Yeo Jin-goo (여진구)
- Yeon Joon-seok (연준석)
- Yoo Ji-tae (유지태)
- Yoo In-young (유인영)
- Yoo So-young (유소영)
- Yoon Eun-hye (윤은혜)
- Yoon Jong-bin (윤종빈)
- Yum Jung-ah (염정아)
- Yu In-chon (유인촌)

=== Sports ===
- Hur Jae (허재) – retired basketball player and coach
- Kang Dong-hee (강동희) – retired basketball player and coach
- Kim Joo-sung (김주성) – basketball player, two-time KBL Most Valuable Player Award winner, and two-time Asian Games gold medalist
- Kim Sun-hyung (김선형) – basketball player and KBL MVP winner
- Kim Yoo-taek (김유택) – retired basketball player and coach, former coach of Chung-Ang's basketball team
- Jung Jin-ho (정진호) – baseball player
- Oh Se-keun (오세근) – basketball player and KBL MVP winner
- Yang Hong-seok (양홍석) – basketball player
- Yoo Hee-kwan (유희관) – retired baseball player, three-time Korean Series champion
- Yoon Bit-garam (윤빛가람) – football player

=== Art ===
- Miseon Lee (이미선) – painter

== See also ==
- List of colleges and universities in South Korea
- Education in South Korea
