= Young Labour =

Young Labour or Young Labor can refer to several youth organizations of labour parties.

- Australian Young Labor, youth wing of the Australian Labor Party
- New Zealand Young Labour, youth wing of the New Zealand Labour Party
- Scottish Young Labour, youth wing of the Scottish Labour Party
- Young Labour (UK), youth wing of the United Kingdom Labour Party
- Young Labor (Mauritius), youth wing of the Mauritian Labour Party

== See also ==
- Labour Youth, the youth wing of the Irish Labour Party
- Labour Youth Forum, the youth wing of the Malta Labour Party
- Young Labour League, a name used by at least three organisations in Australia, United Kingdom and Ireland
- Child labour
