= Robber (TV series) =

- Promotional poster
- Also known as: Bulhandang; Robber of My Heart; Con Man; Bad Guy; Scoundrel
- Genre: Drama, Romance
- Written by: Kim Kyu-wan
- Directed by: Yoo In-shik
- Starring: Jang Hyuk; Lee Da-hae
- Country of origin: South Korea
- Original language: Korean
- No. of episodes: 16

Production
- Production location: Korea
- Running time: 50 minutes on Wednesdays and Thursdays at 21:55 (KST)
- Production company: SidusHQ

Original release
- Network: SBS TV
- Release: 2 January – 28 February 2008

Robber (Korean: 불한당; Hanja: 不汗黨; RR: Bulhandang; lit. 'Con Man') is a 2008 South Korean television series starring Jang Hyuk and Lee Da-hae. It aired on SBS TV from January 2 to February 28, 2008, on Wednesdays and Thursdays at 21:55 for 16 episodes.

This is the first time that Jang and Lee were paired together onscreen; they would later star in The Slave Hunters (2010) and Iris II (2013).

== Plot ==
After graduating from high school, Jin Dal-rae begins working at a local bank in Pyeongchang County. There, she meets Jang Tae-oh, a mountain climber, and she follows him to Seoul, where they get married. Dal-rae becomes pregnant, but before the baby is born, Tae-oh is killed in a freak accident in the mountains. Dal-rae moves in with her mother-in-law, Lee Soon-seom, and together the two women raise her daughter, Yoo-jin.

Several years pass, and Soon-seom herself encourages Dal-rae to move on, even setting her up on blind dates. During one such date, Dal-rae meets the elderly and wealthy Chairman Kim, who isn't really looking for a young wife, but searching for a prospective spouse for his socially inept son Jin-goo. Chairman Kim is impressed with Dal-rae's kindness and integrity, and is determined that she become his daughter-in-law.

Meanwhile, Dal-rae also encounters Kwon Oh-joon. Oh-joon was once a boxer, but he quit because he didn't want to mess up his "pretty boy" face. Since then, he has been masquerading as a fund manager, but in reality he is a con artist who lives off lonely, gullible women by scamming them. His sister Oh-sook is married to an abusive husband, and Oh-joon has been paying off her debts, but he soon grows desperate with the loan sharks hounding him and threatening to kill him unless he pays up. Learning that Dal-rae has been saving to start her own business, she becomes his next target. But as he gets to know her and her family, Oh-joon finds himself falling in love for real.

== Cast ==
- Jang Hyuk as Kwon Oh-joon
- Lee Da-hae as Jin Dal-rae
- Kim Jung-tae as Kim Jin-goo
- Kim Hae-sook as Lee Soon-seom, Dal-rae's mother-in-law
- Hong Kyung-in as Kim Man-doo, Oh-joon's friend
- Son Byong-ho as Kim Ho-jin, gangster boss
- Yoon Yoo-sun as Kwon Oh-sook, Oh-joon's sister
- Kim Hwan-hee as Jang Yoo-jin (nicknamed "Soon-dae"), Dal-rae's daughter
- Kang Ki-hwa as Kim Yeon-ah
- Choi Eun-sook
- Kim In-ae as Chairman Kim, Jin-goo's father
- Ma Dong-seok as Jong-goo, debt collector
- Im Hyung-joon as Joong-sik, the other debt collector
- Seo Yoo-jung as Oh-joon's ex-girlfriend
- Jung Gyu-woon as Jang Tae-oh, Dal-rae's husband
- Kim Eun-joo as Young-sook (cameo, ep 1)
- Shin Seung-hwan

== International broadcast ==
Country	Network	Airing dates
Hong Kong	TVB; TVB Jade; HD Jade	June 5, 2010 – September 25, 2010 (Saturday 13:15 – 14:45)
Thailand	Channel 9 MCOT HD	August 14, 2008 – November 28, 2008 (Every Thursday through Friday from 13.05 to 14.00.)
