= Lee Da-hae =

Australian actress (born 1984)

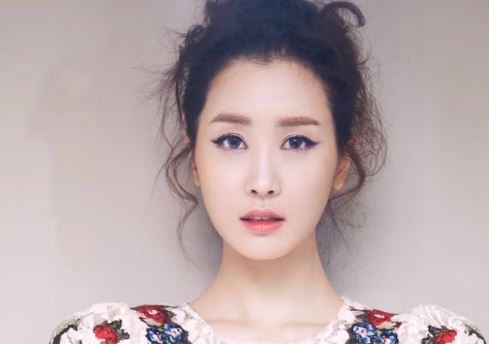
- Lee in 2013
- Born: Byun Da-hye; April 19, 1984 (age 42); Seoul, South Korea
- Other names: Cherry Byeon, Lee Da-hey
- Education: Konkuk University - Theater and Film
- Occupation: Actress
- Years active: 2001–present
- Agent: KX Entertainment
- Spouse: Se7en (m. 2023)

Korean name
- Hangul: 변다혜
- Hanja: 卞多惠
- RR: Byeon Dahye
- MR: Pyŏn Tahye

Stage name
- Hangul: 이다해
- Hanja: 李多海
- RR: I Dahae
- MR: I Tahae

Lee Da-hae or Lee Da-hey (Korean: 이다해; born April 19, 1984), born Byun Da-hye, is an Australian-South Korean actress. She is best known for her roles in Korean dramas such as Heaven's Fate (2004), My Girl (2005), Green Rose (2005), The Slave Hunters (2010), Miss Ripley (2011), and Hotel King (2014), as well as the Chinese dramas Love Actually (2012) and Best Couple (2016).

Lee Da-hae is well known for being fluent in Korean, English and Chinese, earning her huge popularity in China. She is the first Korean actress to speak her lines in Mandarin, displaying her linguistic skills in Chinese dramas.

== Early life ==
Lee Da-hae, or known by her birth name as Byun Da-hye, was born in Seoul, South Korea on April 19, 1984. When she was in the fifth grade, Lee and her family moved to Sydney, Australia. Throughout her adolescence, she performed traditional Korean dance in various festivals, and was known as the "Korean Dancer Girl" at school. Her years of living abroad and studying in Australia made her fluent in English. In her junior year at Burwood Girls High School, Lee and her mother moved back to Seoul to pursue an acting career after winning a pageant while on leave of school. She now lives with her mother in Seoul while her father and her older brother still reside in Sydney.

== Career ==
=== 2001–2004: Beginnings and mainstream popularity ===
Byun made her entertainment debut when she won the 71st Miss Chunhyang Pageant in 2001. Using the stage name Lee Da-hae, she began to appear in minor and supporting roles in television dramas.

In 2004, Lee was cast in her first leading role in the Im Sung-han drama Lotus Flower Fairy (also known internationally as Heaven's Fate), in which she played the pure-hearted daughter of a shaman who becomes alienated by her family and society after her identity is revealed. She won Best New Actress at the 41st Baeksang Arts Awards for her performance.

=== 2005–2009: Rising success ===
But 2005 would become Lee's breakout year. She showcased her versatility in two successful, but very different series. In Green Rose, her character falls in love with a man who gets framed for the attempted murder of her father; years later, she becomes slowly convinced that a doppelgänger is in fact, her boyfriend whom everybody had assumed was dead. Green Rose is her first TV series produced by SBS, Lee reunited with her Lotus Flower Fairy co-stars Jung Hye-sun and Han Jin-hee in Green Rose. In My Girl, she played a lovable con artist who agrees to act as a hotelier's long-lost cousin in order to fulfill his grandfather's last wishes. My Girl, in particular, shot Lee to domestic and Korean Wave stardom.

She returned to the romantic comedy genre in 2007 with Hello! Miss. Lee played the last living daughter of a once-respected clan in the countryside whose traditional feminine virtues is put to the test when the son of a rich investor demands that she sell her ancestral house to him.

In 2008, she starred in Robber, in the role of a young widowed single mother who is targeted by a con man for her savings, but he falls in love with her for real. Later that year, Lee was originally cast as the heroine in the inter-generational epic East of Eden, set against the backdrop of a coal mining town in Taebaek through the 1960s until the present. In this series, Lee reunited with her Sweet 18 co-star Han Ji-hye. Though the drama was a hit, as it went on, Lee's screen time became drastically reduced in favor of other storylines, such that she decided to leave the show in episode 40.

=== 2009–2014: Breakthrough popularity ===
Lee joined Rain's agency J. Tune Entertainment in 2009, then appeared in the music video for "Pas de Deux" with Taiwanese singer/actor Will Pan. She was also admitted to Konkuk University, where she majored in Theater and Film.

In 2010, Lee starred in the hit Joseon period/fusion drama The Slave Hunters, in which she played Un-nyun, who is torn between her past love, a yangban-turned-slave hunter, and her present companion, a general-turned-slave. Lee reunited with her Green Rose co-stars Lee Jong-hyuk and Sung Dong-il. Early in the series, some viewers criticized her for having pristine makeup and manicured nails despite portraying a slave on the run, for allegedly wearing a wrist watch onscreen, and her supposedly "inappropriate and gratuitous" cleavage exposure when her hanbok top was removed in an attempted rape scene. Lee opined that those issues weren't a big deal, and had only been magnified by the show's popularity. Her character also received criticism for being an overly passive damsel in distress, and a "Public Menace Un-nyun" (민폐언년) meme circulated, to the extent that writer Chun Sung-il issued a public defense and apology towards Lee.

In what would have been her big screen debut, she was cast in Song of Springs, a 3D film adaptation of the novel by Kim Hoon about the creator of the gayageum. But funding fell through and the film was never made.

She was then cast in the leading role of Korea's first female royal barista who plots to assassinate King Gojong through poisoned coffee in Gabi, adapted from the historical fiction novel Russian Coffee by Kim Tak-hwan. Lee agreed to star in the film via verbal agreement, but when she dropped out of the project ten days before filming began, production company Ocean Film sued her for breach of contract. In September 2012, the court ruled in favor of the plaintiff, ordering Lee to pay ₩21 million (US$19,000) in damages, or 40% liability. Lee was replaced by Kim So-yeon.

In 2011, Lee played an antiheroine with a traumatic past who lies and manipulates her way up the hotel executive ladder and into the hearts of two powerful men in Miss Ripley. She called the role "a turning point in her acting career." Lee's character was inspired by Shin Jeong-ah, a former curator convicted for fabricating her academic credentials and embezzling funds, and the title references the Hollywood film The Talented Mr. Ripley.

Lee, who is fluent in English and Mandarin, and has a significant fan base in China with more than six million followers on her Weibo microblog, made her Chinese television drama debut in 2012. Previous Korean actresses who had appeared in Chinese productions spoke their lines in Korean and were later dubbed, but Lee worked hard to master the language and fully memorized her lines, making her the first Korean actress to perform in Mandarin. In Love Recipe (internationally known as Love Actually) opposite Taiwanese actor Joe Cheng, she played a part-timer raising her niece on her own who discovers her talent for cooking at a dim sum restaurant and dreams of becoming a chef. It was shot in Shanghai and aired on Hunan TV. Also that year, her contract with DBM Entertainment ended, and she signed with a new agency, Forestar Entertainment.

Lee returned to Korean television in the 2013 espionage-action drama Iris II, the sequel to the 2009 hit series. This was her third time to be paired onscreen with Jang Hyuk, after Robber (2008) and The Slave Hunters (2010).

Lee signed with a new agency, FNC Entertainment in 2014. She reunited with previous My Girl costar Lee Dong-wook in Hotel King, in which she played an heiress trying to save the family-owned seven-star hotel. After Hotel King ended, Lee landed seven endorsement deals with clothing and cosmetic brands across Asia.

=== 2015–2018: Acting setback ===
Lee was next cast as a top actress forced to marry an actor she hates in the Korean-Chinese drama Best Couple; it is the first TV series produced by Chinese e-commerce company Alibaba and aired in China in early 2016. and recorded more than 100 million views.

In April 2016, Lee left FNC Entertainment and signed an exclusive contract with JS Pictures.

In 2018, Lee is set to return to the small screen in Korea, starring in SBS' drama Good Witch.

=== 2019–present: New agencies ===
In April 2019, Lee signed an exclusive contract with FN Entertainment.

In April 2021, Lee signed with Ascendio Reserve following the expiration of her contract with the former agency.

In March 2023, Lee signed with new agency K-Star Global Entertainment.

In April 2024, Lee signed with KX Entertainment as their first actress.

== Personal life ==
In December 2013, Lee filed defamation charges against Internet users who spread malicious rumors claiming she had been involved in an upscale celebrity prostitution ring. Prosecutors cleared Lee of the allegations, stating that she was not one of the entertainers being investigated.

=== Relationship and marriage ===
On September 6, 2016, an exclusive report from Sports Chosen reported that Lee and singer Se7en have been dating for over a year. On March 20, 2023, Lee announced their engagement on her social media accounts. They married in a private ceremony on May 6, 2023, at Hotel Shilla in Seoul.

== Discography ==
=== Singles ===
Year	Song title	Notes
2006	"If You are Willing to" (당신이 원하신다면)	track from My Girl OST, sung in episode 4
2007	"I Love Rock 'n' Roll" (Korean version)	digital single to benefit Donors Camp
2008	"Can, Can, Can!"	for Samsung Hauzen; Kimchi Refrigerator commercial

== Awards and nominations ==
Year	Award	Category	Nominated work	Result
2001	71st Miss Chunhyang Contest	—N/a	—N/a	Won
2004	MBC Drama Awards	Best New Actress	Lotus Flower Fairy	Won
2005	41st Baeksang Arts Awards	Best New Actress for TV	Lotus Flower Fairy	Won
2005	SBS Drama Awards	Excellence Award, Actress in a Drama Special	My Girl	Won
2006	SBS Drama Awards	Top 10 Stars	My Girl	Won
2007	KBS Drama Awards	Excellence Award, Actress in a Miniseries	Hello! Miss	Won
2008	MBC Drama Awards	Excellence Award, Actress	East of Eden	Nominated
2008	SBS Drama Awards	Excellence Award, Actress in a Drama Special	Robber	Nominated
2009	4th Asia Model Awards	Popular Star Award	Lee Da-hae	Won
2010	47th Savings Day	Presidential Citation for Frugality	Lee Da-hae	Won
2010	China Fashion Awards	Asian Fashion Leader	Lee Da-hae	Won
2010	KBS Drama Awards	Top Excellence Award, Actress	The Slave Hunters	Nominated
2010	KBS Drama Awards	Excellence Award, Actress in a Mid-length Drama	The Slave Hunters	Nominated
2010	KBS Drama Awards	Best Couple Award with Jang Hyuk	The Slave Hunters	Won
2011	6th Asia Model Awards	Asia Star Award	Lee Da-hae	Won
2011	Yahoo! Asia Buzz Awards	Korea's Top Female Star	Lee Da-hae	Won
2011	19th Korean Culture and Entertainment Awards	Daesang (Grand Prize) for Acting in a Drama	Miss Ripley	Won
2011	MBC Drama Awards	Excellence Award, Actress in a Miniseries	Miss Ripley	Nominated
2012	3rd LeTV Film and Drama Awards	Best Actress in a TV Drama	Love Actually	Won
2013	8th Asia Model Awards	Asia Star Award	Lee Da-hae	Won
2013	KBS Drama Awards	Excellence Award, Actress in a Mid-length Drama	Iris II	Nominated
2014	MBC Drama Awards	Excellence Award, Actress in a Special Project Drama	Hotel King	Nominated
