= Miseon Lee =

Korean - Irish painter (born 1959)

Miseon Lee MA
- 이미선
- Born: 1959 (age 66–67); South Korea
- Education: Chung-Ang University
- Known for: Portraiture
- Notable work: My Diary (series of self-portraits)
- Children: 1

Korean name
- Hangul: 이미선
- RR: I Miseon
- MR: I Misŏn
- IPA: [i mi.sʰʌ̹n]

Miseon Lee (Korean: 이미선; born 1959) is a Korean - Irish artist based in Ireland since 2005. She is best known for portraits in oil.

== Early life ==
Lee was born in South Korea in 1959.

== Career ==
Lee earned an MA in Fine Art in Chung-Ang University, Seoul, focusing on Western painting styles. She moved to Germany in 1990, and then back to Korea in 1993 to teach theory of art.

She moved to Ireland in 2005 and her career took off after some well-received portraits in 2008. Lee's awards include:

- James Adam's Salesroom Award and The Keating/McLaughlin Award for Outstanding Artwork at the RHA in 2010 and 2012.
- shortlisted for the Davy Portrait Award in 2010.
- shortlisted for Sky Arts Portrait Artist of the Year in 2013
- shortlisted for the BP Portrait Award at the National Portrait Gallery, London in 2013 and 2016.
- shortlisted for the Hennessy Portrait Prize in 2015 at the National Gallery of Ireland
- shortlisted for the Zurich Portrait Prize in 2018
- Won the Fergus Ahern Award in 2021

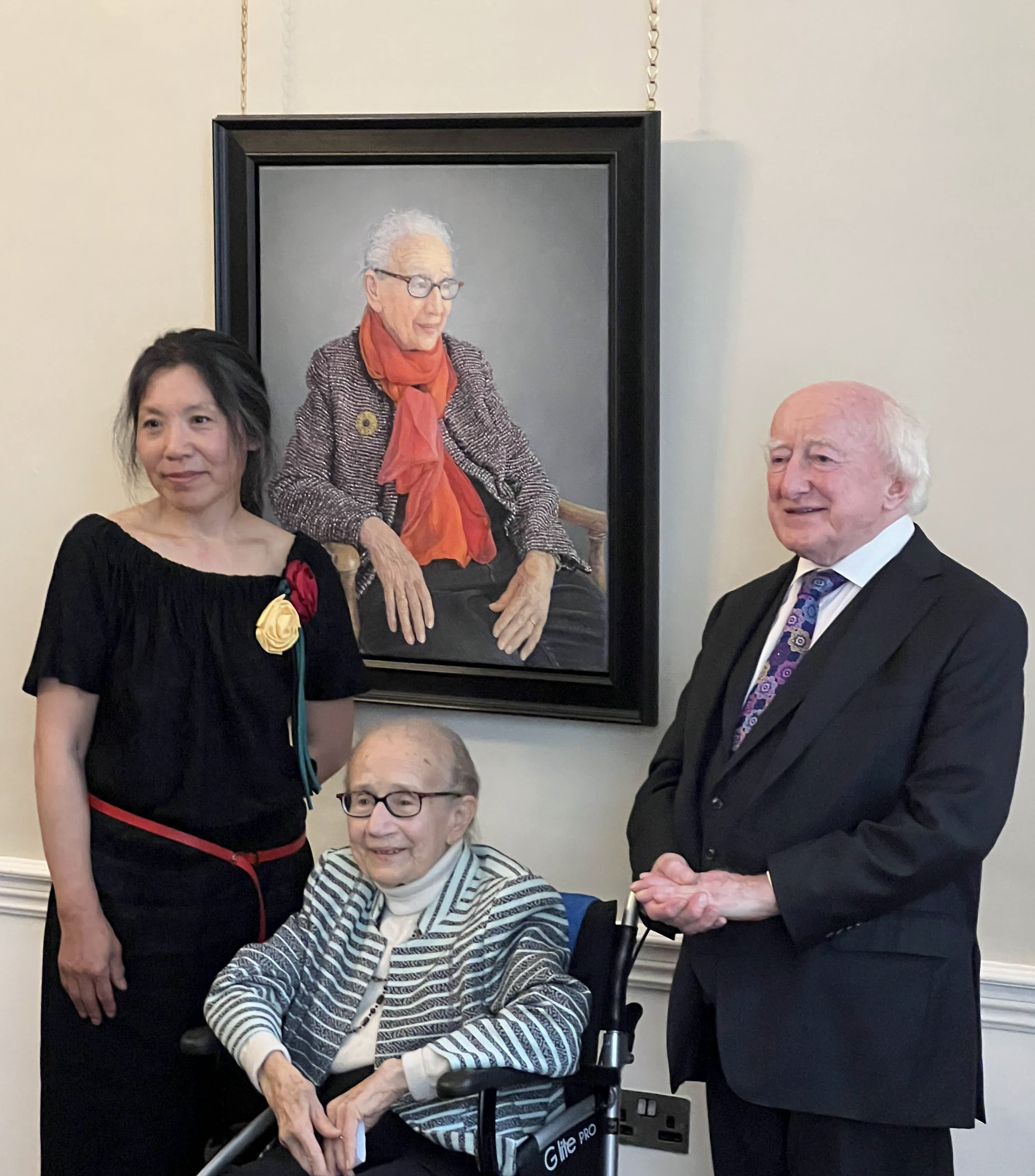
Lee (left) with judge Catherine McGuinness and Irish President Michael D. Higgins.

In 2022 she completed a portrait of former Supreme Court judge Catherine McGuinness.

== Personal life ==
Lee used to live in Limerick. She has one son, who is the subject of many of her portraits.
