= Auh June-sun =

South Korean businessman and politician (1937–2022)

Auh June-sun MP

Member of the National Assembly of South Korea
- In office 30 May 1996 – 29 May 2000
- Preceded by: Park Jun-byeong
- Succeeded by: Shim Gyu-cheol
- Constituency: Boeun County, Okcheon County, Yeongdong County

Personal details
- Born: 5 May 1937 Boeun County, Chūseihoku Province, Korea, Empire of Japan
- Died: 4 August 2022 (aged 85)
- Party: ULD
- Education: Chung-Ang University
- Occupation: Businessman

Auh June-sun (Korean: 어준선; Hanja: 魚浚善; RR: Eo Junseon; 5 May 1937 – 4 August 2022) was a South Korean businessman and politician. A member of the United Liberal Democrats, he served in the National Assembly from 1996 to 2000. Auh also served as the president and CEO of the Ahn-Gook Pharmaceutical Company, as well as the chairman of the Korea Pharmaceutical Manufacturers Association.

Auh died on 4 August 2022, at the age of 85.
