= Catherine McGuinness =

Irish judge and politician (born 1934)

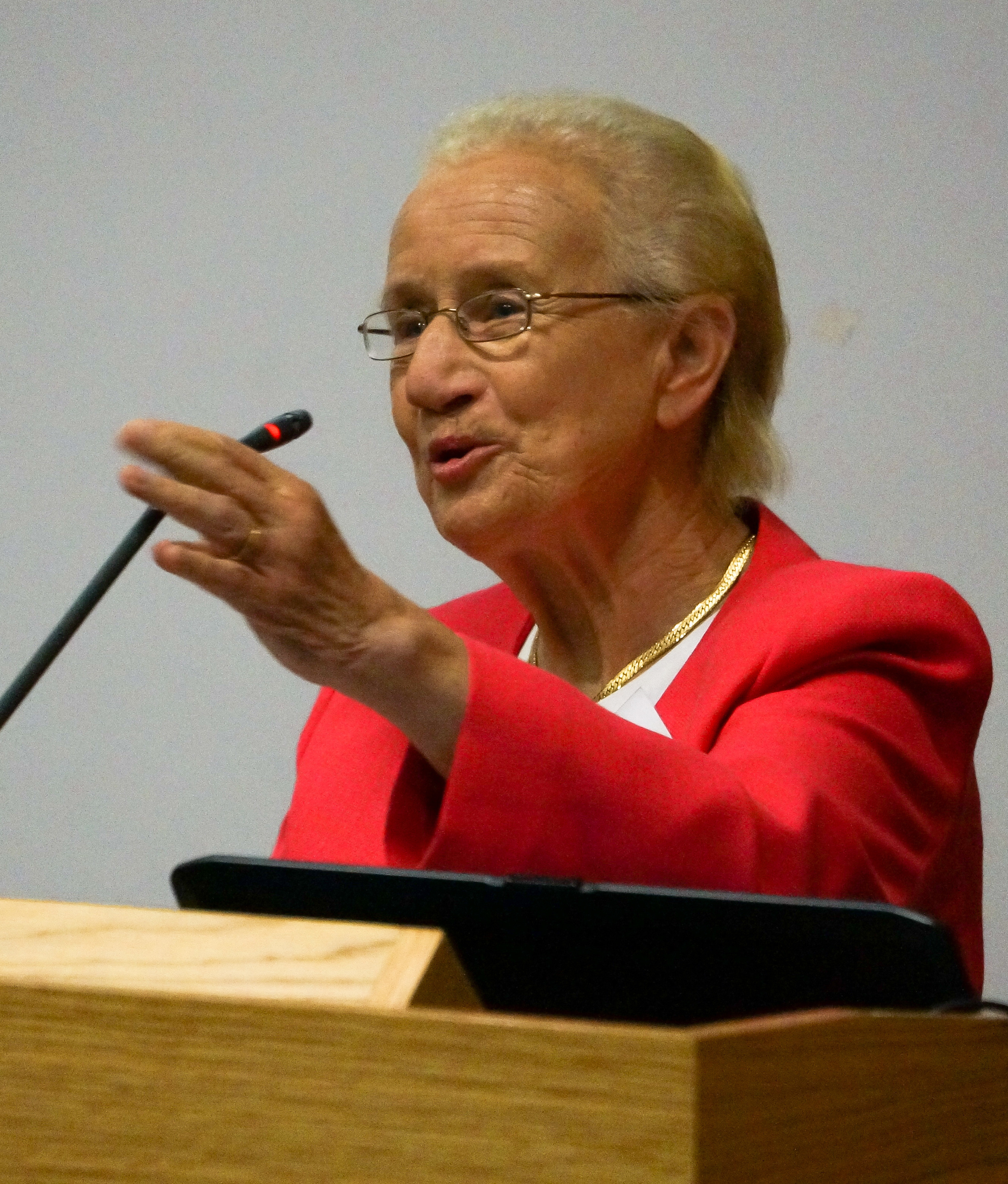
- McGuinness in 2014

Member of the Council of State
- In office 6 January 2012 – 4 April 2019
- Appointed by: Michael D. Higgins
- In office 2 May 1988 – 11 November 1990
- Appointed by: Patrick Hillery

Judge of the Supreme Court
- In office 6 January 2000 – 23 September 2006
- Nominated by: Government of Ireland
- Appointed by: Mary McAleese

Judge of the High Court
- In office 10 August 1996 – 1 July 2000
- Nominated by: Government of Ireland
- Appointed by: Mary Robinson

Judge of the Circuit Court
- In office 22 July 1994 – 10 August 1996
- Nominated by: Government of Ireland
- Appointed by: Mary Robinson

Senator
- In office 23 February 1983 – 25 April 1987
- In office 11 December 1979 – 13 May 1982
- Constituency: Dublin University

Personal details
- Born: Catherine Isobel Bridget Ellis; 14 November 1934 (age 92) Belfast, Northern Ireland
- Spouse: Proinsias Mac Aonghusa (m. 1954; died 2003)
- Children: 3
- Education: Trinity College Dublin; King's Inns

Catherine McGuinness (née Ellis; born 14 November 1934) is a retired Irish judge who served as a Judge of the Supreme Court from 2000 to 2006, a Judge of the High Court from 1996 to 2000, a Judge of the Circuit Court from 1994 to 1996 and a Senator for the Dublin University from 1979 to 1981 and between 1983 and 1987. She was appointed by President Patrick Hillery to the Council of State from 1988 to 1990 and by President Michael D. Higgins from 2012 to 2019.

She was President of the Law Reform Commission from 2007 to 2009. In May 2013, she was appointed Chair of the National University of Ireland Galway Governing Authority.

== Biography ==
Catherine Isabel Brigid Ellis was born in Belfast, Northern Ireland, in 1934 to Canon Robert Ellis and his wife, Sylvia Craig. She attended primary school in Belfast, and was later educated in Alexandra College, Trinity College Dublin and the King's Inns.

In the 1960s, she worked for the Labour Party. She was called to the Irish Bar in 1977 at age 42. In 1989, she was called to the Inner Bar.

In 1979, she was elected as an Independent candidate to Seanad Éireann at a by-election on 11 December 1979 as a senator for the Dublin University constituency, following the resignation of Conor Cruise O'Brien, taking her seat in the 14th Seanad. She was re-elected at the 1981 elections to the 15th Seanad, and in 1983 to the 17th Seanad, where she served until 1987. She lost her seat to David Norris. She was appointed to the Council of State on 2 May 1988 by President Patrick Hillery and served until 1990.

She was appointed a judge of the Circuit Court in 1994, the first woman to hold that office in Ireland. In 1996, she was appointed to the High Court and remained there until her appointment to the Supreme Court in January 2000.

In November 2005, she was appointed adjunct professor at the Faculty of Law, National University of Ireland, Galway. She was also appointed President of the Law Reform Commission in 2005, and held that position until 2011.

In April 2009, she was awarded a "Lord Mayor's Award" by Lord Mayor of Dublin Eibhlin Byrne "for her contribution to the lives of children and families in the city through her pioneering work". In September 2010, she was named as one of the "People of the Year" for "her pioneering, courageous and long-standing service to Irish society". In November 2012, she won the 'Irish Tatler Hall of Fame Award'

In addition to her judicial career, McGuinness has served on the Employment Equality Agency, Kilkenny Incest Investigation, the Forum for Peace and Reconciliation, the National Council of the Forum on End of Life in Ireland, and the Irish Universities Quality Board. In June 2011, she became patron of the Irish Refugee Council. In November 2011, she was appointed Chairperson of the "Campaign for Children"

She has received honorary doctorates from the University of Ulster, the National University of Ireland, the University of Dublin, the Higher Education and Training Awards Council (HETAC) and the Royal College of Surgeons in Ireland.

In February 2013, McGuinness accepted the Honorary Presidency of Trinity College Dublin's Free Legal Advice Centre.

In January 2014, she was appointed by Minister for Communications, Energy and Natural Resources, Pat Rabbitte to chair the expert panel to oversee the preparation of reports on the best underground route options to compare with the Grid Link and Grid West high voltage power lines in Ireland.

In March 2015, she received an Alumni Award from Trinity College Dublin.

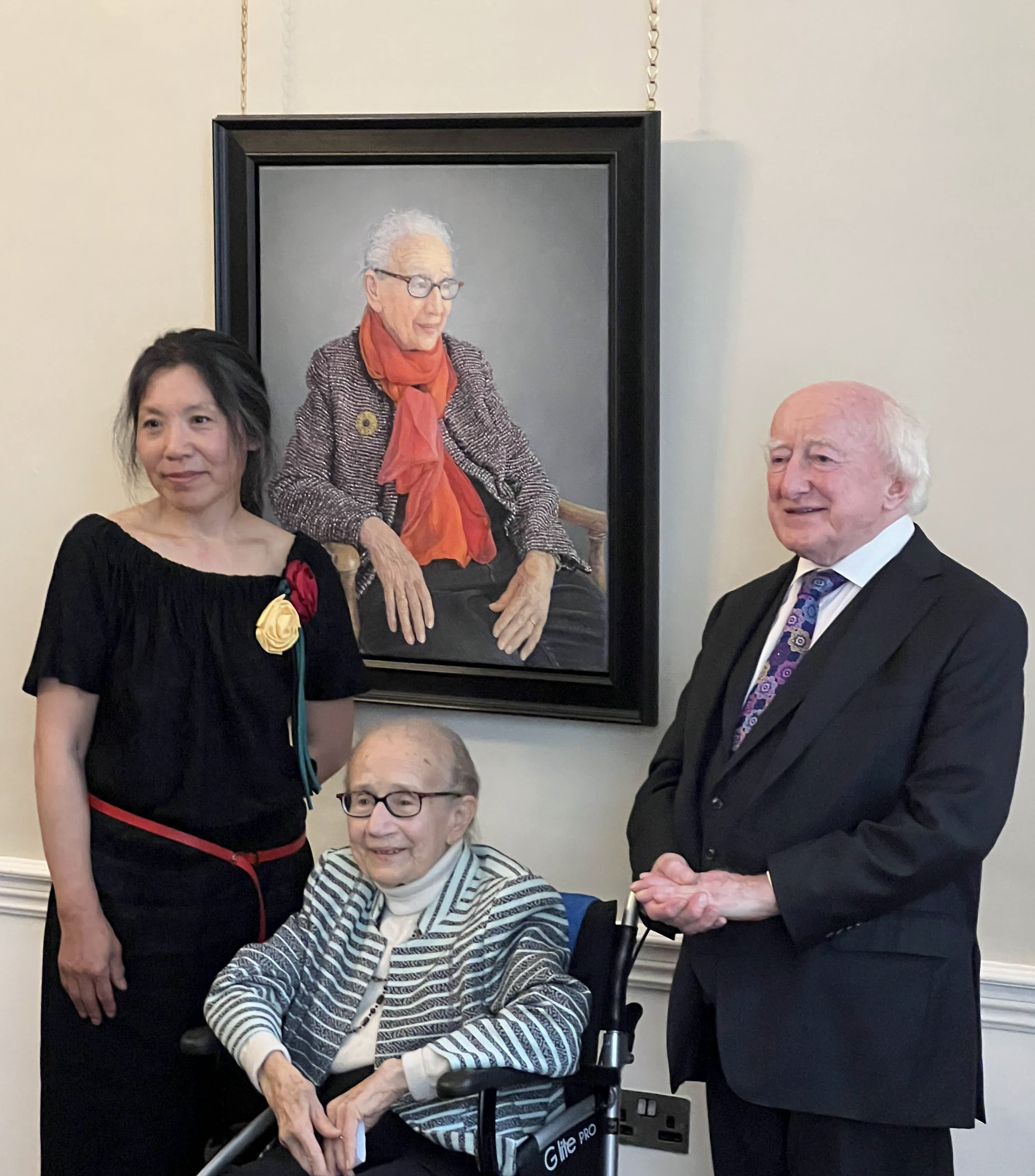
Miseon Lee, Catherine McGuinness, President Michael D. Higgins in 2022.

In July 2022 a portrait of her by Miseon Lee was unveiled at the National Gallery of Ireland. The portrait was presented to the Gallery by Tara Doyle, chair of Matheson

== Catherine McGuinness Fellowship on Children's Rights and Child Law ==
In November 2014, the Children's Rights Alliance established the Catherine McGuinness Fellowship on Children's Rights and Child Law, a one-year Fellowship Programme for newly qualified barristers to work as part of their Legal and Policy Team on law and policy reform for children in the area of children's rights and child law in the Irish context. The Programme was developed in partnership with the Bar Council of Ireland and with the support of the Family Lawyers Association of Ireland.

The Fellowship was launched by the Chief Justice of Ireland, Susan Denham who described McGuinness as "an advocate at heart" and a "patriot, in the true sense of the word" who "stands up for the rights of others, particularly those who are marginalised and vulnerable in our society."

== Personal life ==
In 1955, she married Proinsias Mac Aonghusa from Galway; for her married name, Catherine chose to use "McGuinness", the English language equivalent of Mac Aonghusa. They had three children together.
