= Paran (band) =

South Korean boy band

Paran 파란
- Origin: Seoul, South Korea
- Genres: K-pop, pop
- Years active: 2005–2011
- Label: NH Media (2005–2011)
- Members: PO; Ace; Ryan; AJ; Neo

Paran (파란) was a South Korean boyband formed by NH Media in 2005. The five members of the band had been living together for two years while being trained in singing and dancing. Being fluent in English and Japanese, the band has targeted for overseas markets from debut. Plus all the members have been trained in all areas of musical production from chorus, dubbing to sub-producing. The group unofficially disbanded after members had left for the army and Ryan and Ace released solo singles along with AJ joining U-KISS.

== Discography ==
=== Albums ===
- Hold My Breath (2005)
- Beyond The Blue Sky (2006)
- U.R.M.S (2008)

=== Singles ===
- "The First"
- "Merry Christmas"

== Awards ==
Year	Award-Giving Body	Category	Work	Result
2005	Mnet Asian Music Awards	Best New Group	"First Love"	Nominated
