= Young Labour League =

Name used by at least three organisations in Australia, United Kingdom and Ireland

At least three organisations have used the name Young Labour League.

== Australia ==
The first Young Labor League appears to have been founded in Australia in the second half of the 19th century, and became associated with the Australian Labor Party.

== United Kingdom ==
The second Young Labour League was founded in Clapham, England, in 1920, and became the youth wing of the Labour Party in the United Kingdom in 1924. It would later become the modern Young Labour.

== Ireland ==
The third Young Labour League was founded in Dublin in the Republic of Ireland in about 1966 or 1967 with the encouragement of Proinsias Mac Aonghusa. It was founded by Brian O'Higgins, the son of an Irish actor, with some female members in Dublin. Despite O'Higgins' efforts, and support from within the Irish Labour Party from figures such as Flor O'Mahony (later a Senator and a Member of the European Parliament), it was not in its early days recognised as an affiliated body.

An early meeting was addressed by Noel Browne.

Its campaigns included supporting Radio Caroline, a pirate radio station, selling the Labour Party newspaper in Dublin pubs, and it produced a regular newsletter mostly written by Brian O'Higgins, including articles on the June 1967 War in the Middle East, which was composited and hand printed on a small old press in O'Higgins' house in Dublin.

It had the only stall at Liberty Hall, Dublin, at the Party's annual conference at which Brendan Corish announced that: "The Seventies will be Socialist". The stall, at the entrance to the conference, sold Corish Speaks (a collection of speeches on national affairs by Brendan Corish, edited and introduced by Proinsias Mac Aonghusa), pamphlets by James Connolly, and other publications.

Its members assisted the Party during elections.

The League carried on a campaign against James Tully, a Labour Party deputy (Member of Parliament) in the legislative assembly known as the Dáil, but it was intensely loyal to Brendan Corish. It criticized Tully as a numbers man and an opportunist. Those fears were later to be justified, as Tully, when he later became the Minister for Local Government, was alleged to have attempted a gerrymander, which resulted in a large voter backlash against the Irish Labour Party at the next election.

It had ceased to exist by the early 1970s. It was succeeded by Labour Youth.
