= Jeon Jong-hyuk =

South Korean footballer (born 1996)

Personal information
- Full name: Jeon Jong-hyuk
- Date of birth: 21 March 1996 (age 30)
- Place of birth: Seongnam, South Korea
- Height: 1.87 m (6 ft 1 1/2 in)
- Position: Goalkeeper

Team information
- Current team: Busan IPark
- Number: 91

Youth career
- Yonsei University

Senior career*
Years	Team	Apps	(Gls)
2018-2021	Seongnam FC	22	(0)
2021	→ Bucheon FC 1995 (loan)	16	(0)
2022	Busan IPark		
- * Club domestic league appearances and goals as of 13 January 2022

Jeon Jong-hyuk (Korean: 전종혁; born 21 March 1996) is a South Korean former footballer who played as goalkeeper for Busan IPark in K League 2.
