= The Slave Hunters =

2010 South Korean television series

- Poster
- Also known as: Chuno
- Hangul: 추노
- Hanja: 推奴
- RR: Chuno
- MR: Ch'uno
- Genre: Action; Historical; Drama
- Developed by: KBS Drama
- Written by: Chun Sung-il
- Directed by: Kwak Jung-hwan
- Starring: Jang Hyuk; Oh Ji-ho; Lee Da-hae; Gong Hyung-jin; Lee Jong-hyuk
- Music by: Choi Cheol-ho: Kim Jong-cheon
- Country of origin: South Korea
- Original language: Korean
- No. of episodes: 24

Production
- Executive producer: Choi Ji Young KBS
- Producers: Ki Min Soo; Kim Shin Il
- Production location: South Korea
- Running time: Wednesdays and Thursdays at 21:55 (KST) 70 min
- Production company: Chorokbaem Media

Original release
- Network: KBS2
- Release: January 6 – March 25, 2010

The Slave Hunters (Korean: 추노; RR: Chuno) is a 2010 South Korean action historical drama set in the Joseon period about a slave hunter (played by Jang Hyuk) who is tracking down a general-turned-runaway slave (Oh Ji-ho) as well as searching for the woman he loves (Lee Da-hae). It aired on KBS2 from January 6 to March 25, 2010 on Wednesdays and Thursdays at 21:55 for 24 episodes.

The hit series topped the ratings chart for 7 consecutive weeks, averaging 31.7% and reaching a peak of 35.9%. This is the reunion of Green Rose cast members Lee Da-hae, Lee Jong-hyuk, and Sung Dong-il.

In 2010, the series was honored at the Seoul International Drama Awards, and the KBS Drama Awards (notably the highest prize Daesang for lead actor Jang Hyuk). Jang also received a best actor nomination from the 2011 International Emmy Awards for his performance.

== Synopsis ==
Set during the Joseon period, The Slave Hunters follows the story of Lee Dae-gil, Song Tae-ha, and Kim Hye-won.

Lee Dae-gil is a man from a noble family, whose life is ruined by Keun-nom (큰놈이, literally "Big One"), a slave owned by Dae-gil's family. Because Keun-nom's sister Un-nyun and the young master Dae-gil are in love, Dae-gil's parents lock Un-nyun in a shed and leave her to die of dehydration. So Keun-nom burns down Dae-gil's house while rescuing her, then uses a sickle to slash Dae-gil's face. The house collapses shortly after, and Keun-nom and Un-nyun believe Dae-gil to be dead.

Keun-nom runs away with Un-nyun and eventually accumulates enough wealth to buy the Jokbo of a noble family to change his identity. Under his new identity as the member of the noble Kim family, he then changes his name to Kim Seong-hwan and his sister Un-nyun's name to Kim Hye-won.

Driven by his desire for revenge as well as his obsession/love for Un-nyun, Dae-gil endures ten harsh years on the street and makes his name as a slave hunter. Dae-gil carries a sketch of Un-nyun at all times and searches for her wherever he goes.

Song Tae-ha is a military general who has spent years serving Crown Prince Sohyeon, who was living in China as a political hostage after Joseon lost the war with the Qing Dynasty. Upon their release to Joseon, they find themselves embroiled in an even bigger political turmoil. The crown prince dies under suspicious circumstances shortly after returning to Joseon, the crown princess and two of his three young sons are also killed while the youngest son is exiled on Cheju island. Tae-ha is framed for stealing military rations and is demoted to a slave along with his loyal subordinates.

When Tae-ha learns that the exiled youngest son of the late prince, who he believes to be the only rightful heir to the crown, is in danger, he is determined to protect him and have him declared the new crown prince. He escapes forced labor and sets off his journey to Jeju island. Along the way, Tae-ha comes across Hye-won/Un-nyun, who is on the run from an arranged marriage to a powerful noble, and saves her from danger. Dae-gil is hired to capture Tae-ha and chases after him, who, unbeknownst to Dae-gil, is now traveling and starting a romantic relationship with the woman for whom he has been obsessively searching for ten years.

== Cast ==
=== Main ===
- Jang Hyuk as Lee Dae-gil
- Oh Ji-ho as Song Tae-ha
- Lee Da-hae as Un-nyun / Kim Hye-won
- Gong Hyung-jin as Eop-bok
- Lee Jong-hyuk as Hwang Chul-woong
- Han Jung-soo as Janggoon Choi ("General Choi")
- Kim Ji-seok as Wang-son ("big hand")
- Sung Dong-il as Chun Ji-ho
- Kim Eung-soo as Lee Gyeong-sik
- Kim Ha-eun as Seol-hwa

=== Supporting ===
- Min Ji-ah as Cho-bok
- Yoon Gi-won as Won Ki-yoon
- Danny Ahn as Baek-ho
- Yoon Ji-min as Yoon-ji
- Jo Jae-wan as Keun-nom / Kim Seong-hwan
- Ahn Suk-hwan as Hwabaek Bang
- Lee Han-wi as Pogyo Oh
- Yoon Mun-sik as Horse doctor
- Jo Mi-ryung as Keun Jumo ("elder hostess")
- Yoon Joo-hee as Jakeun Jumo ("young hostess")
- Cho Jin-woong as Kwak Han-seom
- Park Ki-woong as Geu boon ("that person")
- Kim Ha-yoon as Crown Princess Kang
- Yoon Dong-hwan as Long Guda (General Qing)
- Kim Young-ae as Mogabi
- Kim Kap-soo as King Injo
- Ha Si-eun as Lee Sun-young (Chul-woong's wife)
- Jo Sung-il as Lee Kwang-jae
- Kim Jin-woo as Lee Seok-gyeon
- Kang Sung-min as Crown Prince Sohyeon
- Lee In as Grand Prince Bongrim
- Lee Dae-ro as Im Yeong-ho
- Choi Deok-moon as Seonbi Jo
- Joo Da-young as Eun-sil
- Ahn Gil-kang as Jjak-gui ("slat ear")
- Yoon Jin-ho as Park Jong-soo
- Kim Young-ok as Chul-woong's mother
- Song Seo-yeon as Kisaeng Chan
- Go Joon-hee as Je-ni
- Wi Yang-ho as Bandit boss
- Lee Dae-yeon as Bhikkhu Myung-ahn
- Jo Hee-bong as Kkeut-bong
- Sa Hyun-jin as Jang Pil-soon
- Park Hee-jin as Village woman
- Hwang Hyeon-hee as Spy at the inn
- Kim Kyeong-jin as Boatman
- Jang Dong-min as Bookstore owner
- Jung Ho-bin as General Shin
- Jeon Se-hyeon as Wang-son's lover

=== Special appearances ===
- Lee Won-jong as Double-acting slave at the training site
- Yoo Chae-yeong as Wang-son's lover
- Choi Cheol-ho as Monk inside the jail
- Oh Ji-heon as Bandit
- Jo Sung-ha as Lee Jae-joon
- Marco as Yangban
- Kim Sung-soo as Citizen
- Kim Chang-ryul as Citizen
- Lee Ha-neul as Citizen
- Han Min-kwan as Citizen

== Original soundtrack ==
The Slave Hunter OST

Soundtrack album by Various artists
- Recorded: 2010
- Genre: Soundtrack
- Language: Korean
- Label: Pony Canyon Korea

The Slave Hunter OST 1
No.	Title	Artist	Length
1.	"Change" (바꿔)	Gloomy30s	4:26
2.	"Stigma" (낙인)	Yim Jae-beom	4:46
3.	"The Moon has passed" (달에지다)	Beige	4:13
4.	"Minechan" (민초의난)	MC Sniper	3:22
5.	"Damned Love" (지독한사랑)	WoongSan	4:29
6.	"Chuno"	Kim Jong Chun and Choi Chul Ho	2:51
7.	"Akto"	Kim Jong Chun and Choi Chul Ho	4:46
8.	"Alive"	Kim Jong Chun and Choi Chul Ho	2:35
9.	"Black Wind Mountain"	Kim Jong Chun and Choi Chul Ho	2:32
10.	"Do not cry black"	Kim Jong Chun and Choi Chul Ho	3:58
11.	"Flower route"	Kim Jong Chun and Choi Chul Ho	2:58
12.	"Incense"	Kim Jong Chun and Choi Chul Ho	2:14
13.	"Lost Paradise"	Kim Jong Chun and Choi Chul Ho	3:10
14.	"Irrational interest"	Flower star	3:10
15.	"Wanted"	Kim Jong Chun and Choi Chul Ho	3:10
16.	"Yelling in the heaven"	Kim Jong Chun and Choi Chul Ho	2:11

The Slave Hunter OST 2
No.	Title	Artist	Length
1.	"Stray Child" (미아)	JeA (Brown Eyed Girls)	4:26

== Ratings ==
Date	Episode	Nationwide	Seoul
2010-01-06	1	22.9 (4th)	23.8 (3rd)
2010-01-07	2	24.8 (2nd)	25.3 (3rd)
2010-01-13	3	27.2 (2nd)	27.6 (3rd)
2010-01-14	4	30.8 (2nd)	31.4 (2nd)
2010-01-20	5	30.3 (2nd)	31.0 (1st)
2010-01-21	6	33.7 (1st)	34.9 (1st)
2010-01-27	7	31.6 (1st)	31.7 (1st)
2010-01-28	8	33.5 (1st)	34.3 (1st)
2010-02-03	9	34.6 (1st)	35.2 (1st)
2010-02-04	10	35.0 (1st)	35.8 (1st)
2010-02-10	11	32.5 (1st)	32.6 (1st)
2010-02-11	12	33.9 (1st)	34.0 (1st)
2010-02-17	13	32.5 (1st)	32.4 (1st)
2010-02-18	14	31.9 (1st)	31.7 (1st)
2010-02-24	15	31.9 (1st)	32.2 (1st)
2010-02-25	16	33.4 (1st)	33.6 (1st)
2010-03-03	17	31.6 (1st)	31.8 (1st)
2010-03-04	18	33.8 (1st)	33.8 (1st)
2010-03-10	19	33.5 (1st)	34.0 (1st)
2010-03-11	20	32.0 (1st)	31.5 (1st)
2010-03-17	21	31.2 (1st)	30.9 (1st)
2010-03-18	22	30.4 (1st)	29.6 (1st)
2010-03-24	23	32.8 (1st)	33.2 (1st)
2010-03-25	24	35.9 (1st)	36.3 (1st)
Average		31.7%	32.0%

Source: TNS Media Korea

== Awards and nominations ==
Year	Award	Category	Recipient	Result
2010	46th Baeksang Arts Awards	Best Drama	The Slave Hunters	Nominated
2010	46th Baeksang Arts Awards	Best Actor	Jang Hyuk	Nominated
2010	46th Baeksang Arts Awards	Best New Director	Kwak Jung-hwan	Nominated
2010	46th Baeksang Arts Awards	Best Screenplay	Chun Sung-il	Won
2010	5th Seoul International Drama Awards	Best Miniseries	The Slave Hunters	Won
2010	5th Seoul International Drama Awards	Outstanding Korean Drama Prize Category: Grand Prize (Daesang)	The Slave Hunters	Won
2010	5th Seoul International Drama Awards	Outstanding Korean Director	Kwak Jung-hwan	Won
2010	5th Seoul International Drama Awards	Outstanding Korean Actor	Jang Hyuk	Won
2010	3rd Korea Drama Awards	Best Drama	The Slave Hunters	Won
2010	3rd Korea Drama Awards	Best Actor	Jang Hyuk	Won
2010	3rd Korea Drama Awards	Best Writer in a Miniseries	Chun Sung-il	Won
2010	37th Korea Broadcasting Awards	Grand Prize (Daesang)	The Slave Hunters	Won
2010	37th Korea Broadcasting Awards	Best Short TV Drama	The Slave Hunters	Won
2010	37th Korea Broadcasting Awards	Best Director	Kwak Jung-hwan	Won
2010	37th Korea Broadcasting Awards	Best Screenplay	Chun Sung-il	Won
2010	23rd Grimae Awards	Grand Prize	Kim Jae-hwan, Son Hyung-sik	Won
2010	23rd Grimae Awards	Best Actor	Jang Hyuk	Won
2010	KBS Drama Awards	Grand Prize (Daesang)	Jang Hyuk	Won
2010	KBS Drama Awards	Top Excellence Award, Actor	Jang Hyuk	Nominated
2010	KBS Drama Awards	Top Excellence Award, Actor	Kim Kap-soo	Won
2010	KBS Drama Awards	Top Excellence Award, Actor	Lee Jong-hyuk	Nominated
2010	KBS Drama Awards	Top Excellence Award, Actress	Lee Da-hae	Nominated
2010	KBS Drama Awards	Excellence Award, Actor in a Mid-length Drama	Oh Ji-ho	Won
2010	KBS Drama Awards	Excellence Award, Actress in a Mid-length Drama	Lee Da-hae	Nominated
2010	KBS Drama Awards	Best Supporting Actor	Sung Dong-il	Won
2010	KBS Drama Awards	Best Supporting Actress	Jo Mi-ryung	Nominated
2010	KBS Drama Awards	Best New Actress	Kim Ha-eun	Nominated
2010	KBS Drama Awards	Best Couple Award	Jang Hyuk and Lee Da-hae	Won
2011	International Emmy Awards	Best Performance by an Actor	Jang Hyuk	Nominated

== See also ==
- Conspiracy in the Court (2007)
- List of films featuring slavery
