= Hello! Miss =

2007 South Korean TV series

- Promotional poster
- Also known as: Hello! My Lady; Hello! Baby
- Genre: Romance, Comedy, Drama
- Based on: Five Kimchi Mandu by Lee Ji-wan
- Written by: Park Young-sook
- Directed by: Lee Min-hong
- Starring: Lee Da-hae; Lee Ji-hoon; Ha Seok-jin; Yeon Mi-joo
- Ending theme: "Funky Dance" by Crying Nut
- Country of origin: South Korea
- Original language: Korean
- No. of episodes: 16

Production
- Producer: Lee Hyun-wook
- Production location: Korea
- Running time: 70 minutes on Mondays and Tuesdays at 21:55 (KST)

Original release
- Network: Korean Broadcasting System
- Release: March 19 – May 8, 2007

Hello! Miss (Korean: 헬로! 애기씨; RR: Hello! aegissi; also known as Hello! My Lady) is a 2007 South Korean television series starring Lee Da-hae, Lee Ji-hoon, Ha Seok-jin and Yeon Mi-joo. Based on Lee Ji-wan's novel Five Kimchi Mandu, the series aired on KBS2 from March 19 to May 8, 2007 on Mondays and Tuesdays at 21:55 for 16 episodes.

== Plot ==
Lee Su-ha is the last living daughter of a once-respected clan in the countryside. Always wearing a beautiful hanbok, Su-ha is the embodiment of traditional feminine virtues. Her peaceful life is interrupted when the son of a rich investor, Hwang Dong-gyu demands that she sell her ancestral house, which has 99 pillars, to him. (Under rules dating from the Joseon period, no one but a king could have a house with more than 99 pillars.) But she scoffs at his offer and tries to save her home by holding traditional home-stay programs for urban residents. She also finds out that the kind-hearted Dong-gyu and his brash cousin and rival Hwang Chan-min, are descended from a servant family that worked for her clan during the days of the monarchy.

== Cast ==
=== Main characters ===
- Lee Da-hae as Lee Su-ha
  - Lee Ji-wan as young Su-ha

The grandniece of the Je-an Lee clan and the owner of the clan's historical home Hwa Ahn Dang, Su-ha lost her mother due to stomach cancer a year ago, while her father left for Seoul with another woman many years ago. Refusing to lead a reclusive life in the Hwa Ahn Dang, Su-ha decides to explore her life. She falls in love with a guy named Hwang Dong-gyu, who urges her to sell Hwa Ahn Dang to him.

- Lee Ji-hoon as Hwang Dong-gyu

A grandson of the corporation TOP Group, Dong-gyu was raised by his stingy grandfather, the chairman of the group, but is too simple-hearted and well-mannered for a scion. His ignorance and simplicity, which run counter to his hard-hearted personality, add to his "unbalanced" charm. He invests his youth in learning how to inherit his grandfather's business but falls in love with the pure-hearted girl Su-ha. However, despite his strong feelings for her, he stumbles a lot due to his poor courting skills. He becomes completely engrossed in trying to buy the Hwa Ahn Dang after his grandfather promises to pass his managerial rights to the grandson who gives him the Hwa Ahn Dang.

- Ha Seok-jin as Hwang Chan-min

Chan-min is Dong-gyu's cousin and also a grandson of a family-owned conglomerate, but he has no interest in inheriting his family's business. He just takes what he has for granted and concentrates solely on modeling. His dazzling looks and outgoing personality captivate girls' hearts at once. But he changes completely after he meets Su-ha and opens his eyes to genuine love. To win her heart, he embarks on learning business and emerges as Dong-gyu's rival.

- Yeon Mi-joo as Seo Hwa-ran

Hwa-ran is a daughter of a madwoman who gave birth to her at the Hwa Ahn Dang. After she ran away from home while in middle school, she was smart enough to become adopted by a rich, educated and elderly African-American couple. She returns to Korea after graduating from college in the U.S. and completely "upgrading" her body through cosmetic surgeries. As a nobody who became somebody through painstaking effort, she challenges Su-ha, whom she considers an obstacle in her eventful life. Much later, she finally falls in love with Su-ha's older brother Joon-young - who always supported her when they were kids.

=== Supporting characters ===
- Joo Jong-hyuk as Lee Joon-young, Su-ha's half brother
- Moon Chun-shik as Jang Dae-ri
- Jang Young-ran as Oh Jung-sook, Su-ha's friend
- Park In-hwan as Hwang Man-bok, Dong-gyu's grandfather
- Lee Min as Lee Joon-hee
- Park In-hwan as Lee Don-kyu, Su-ha's father
- Choi Su-rin as Hwang Yoo-il, Dong-gyu's aunt
- Kim Hee-jin as Han Soo-jung, Su-ha's stepmother
- Kim Hyun-joo as Lee Myung-ook, Chan-min's mother
- Kim Kwang-kyu as Chief Kwak
- Jo Eun-duk as Ahn Sung-daek
- Park Soon-chun as Kkot Boon-yi, Hwa-ran's mother
- Yeo Woon-kay as Lee Hak
- Heo Hyun-ho as Byung-tae
- Yeo Eun-gi
- Kim Joo-young
- Han Young-kwang

== Awards ==
Year	Award	Category	Recipient	Result	Ref
2007	KBS Drama Awards	Excellence Actress Award - Miniseries	Lee Da-hae	Won	

== International broadcast ==
- Philippines: Aired on GMA Network beginning July 7, 2008.
- Thailand: Aired on BBTV Channel 7 (title in Thai: คุณชายไฮโซ คุณหนูโอทอป).
