= Joo Jong-hyuk (actor, born 1983) =

South Korean actor and singer

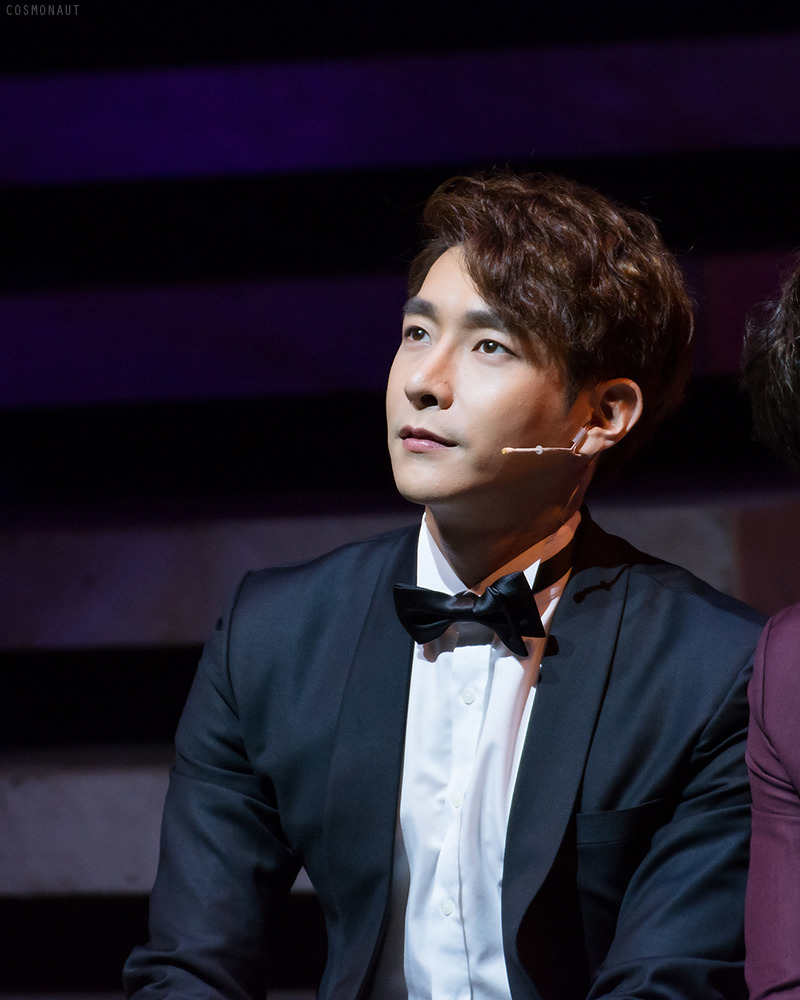
- Joo in 2016
- Born: Joo Jung-hyuk; 19 October 1983 (age 42); South Korea
- Other names: Ryan, Ju Jong-hyuk, Chu Jong-hyuk
- Occupations: Actor; singer
- Years active: 2006–present

Ryan (Korean: 라이언; born Joo Jong-hyuk on 29 October 1983) is a South Korean actor and singer. He's the lead vocalist of the K-pop group Paran and is also the oldest of the five members.

He graduated from Chungang University with a Major in Theater and Film. He is fluent in English, Korean and Japanese.

== Filmography ==
=== Film ===
Year	Title	Role	Notes	Ref.
TBA	One Ten Thousandths of a Second			

=== Television series ===
Year	Title	Role	Notes/Ref.
2005	Banjun Drama		
2006	Rainbow Romance		
2006	Break		
2007	Hello! Miss	Lee Joon-yong	
2007	I Am Sam	Ji Seon Hoo	
2007	Drama City		
2021	Be My Dream Family	Hyun Si-woon, a book marketer	KBS1
2023	Love to Hate You	Seo Young-ki	Netflix Web drama

=== Television show ===
Year	Title	Notes/Ref.
2017	King of Mask Singer	Contestant as "Power Up Popeye Eating Spinach" (Episodes 119–120)
