= Lee Jong-hyuk =

South Korean actor (born 1974)

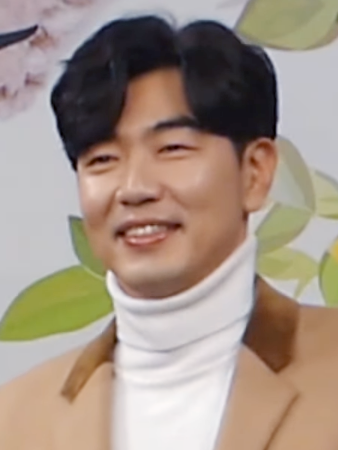
- Lee in January 2019
- Born: July 31, 1974 (age 52); Seocho-gu, Seoul, South Korea
- Education: Seoul Institute of the Arts - Theater
- Years active: 1998–present
- Agent: Dain Entertainment (formerly Motion Media)
- Spouse: Choi Eun-ae
- Children: 2

Korean name
- Hangul: 이종혁
- Hanja: 李鐘赫
- RR: I Jonghyeok
- MR: I Chonghyŏk

Lee Jong-hyuk (Korean: 이종혁; born July 31, 1974) is a South Korean actor. After more than a decade of leading and supporting roles on stage, film and television, he gained newfound mainstream popularity through the 2012 romantic comedy series A Gentleman's Dignity.

== Filmography ==
=== Film ===
Year	Title	Role	Notes	Ref.
1998	Shiri	Special agent, North Korean 8th Squad		
1999	Attack the Gas Station	Thug 4, Yonggari's underling		
2000	General Hospital, The Movie: A Thousand Days			
2004	Once Upon a Time in High School	Cha Jong-hoon		
2004	Shinsukki Blues	Judicial Affairs team leader / Shin Seok-gi		
2005	Mr. Socrates	Squad leader Shin		
2006	A Dirty Carnival	Gangster in the movie		
2006	Dark Forest	Jung Woo-jin		
2006	A Good Day to Have an Affair	Fox 2		
2008	Miss Gold Digger	Han Dong-min		
2008	Radio Dayz	K		
2008	Crush and Blush	Seo Jong-cheol		
2010	Parallel Life	Lee Kang-seong		
2011	Hindsight	Baek Kyung-min		
2012	Rise of the Guardians	Pitch Black	animated, Korean dubbed	
2014	The File	Han Dong-min		
2015	My Sister, the Pig Lady	Joon-seob		
2018	Notebook from My Mother	Gyu-hyeon		
2018	Student A	Teacher		
2018	Unfinished	Choi Ki-cheol		
2019	Love, Again	An Sang-cheol		

=== Television series ===
Key
†	Denotes television productions that have not yet been released

Year	Title	Role	Notes	Ref.
2003	Span Drama			
2005	Green Rose	Shin Hyun-tae		
2006	Hello, God	Park Dong-jae		
2006	Dr. Kkang	Seok Hee-jung		
2007	Crazy in Love	Lee Hyun-chul		
2007	Flowers for My Life		Cameo	
2008	Bichunmoo	Ha Chang-ryong		
2008	Formidable Rivals	Yoo Gwan-pil		
2008	Chosun Police 2	Jin Moo-young		
2009	Temptation of an Angel	Jung Sang-mo	Cameo	
2010	The Slave Hunters	Hwang Chul-woong		
2010	Marry Me, Please	Kim Tae-ho		
2010	The Fugitive: Plan B	Screening room translator Hwang Chul-ho	Cameo (episode 2)	
2011	Detectives in Trouble	Jung Il-do		
2011	KBS Drama Special : Yeongdeok Women's Wrestling Team	Park Joo-young	one act-drama	
2011	Vampire Prosecutor	Prosecutor Jin	Cameo (episode 8)	
2012	Korean Peninsula	Choi Seong-min	Cameo	
2012	A Gentleman's Dignity	Lee Jung-rok		
2013	Flower Boys Next Door	Hongdae guru	Cameo (episode 1)	
2013	Dating Agency: Cyrano	Seo Byung-hoon		
2013	Master's Sun	Lee Jae-seok	Cameo (episode 11)	
2014	Pluto Secret Society	Kang Seok's former colleague	Cameo (episode 11)	
2014	Drama Festival : Turning Point	Yeom Dong-il	one act-drama	
2015	Flower of Queen	Park Min-joon		
2015	Bubble Gum	Kang Suk-joon		
2015	Reply 1988	Sun Woo [Adult - Voice]	Cameo (episode 20)	
2016	Descendants of the Sun	Captain Kim Jin-seok	Cameo	
2018	Yeonnam-dong 539	Sang Bong-tae		
2019	Spring Turns to Spring	Lee Hyung-suk		
2019	He Is Psychometric	Lee Jeong-rok	Cameo (episode 1,8)	
2019	Treadstone	Colonel Shin		
2019	Rookie Historian Goo Hae-ryung	Mob Boss	Cameo (episode 1–2)	
2020	Good Casting	Dong Gwan-soo		
2020	Men Are Men	Seo Hyun Joo's blind date	Cameo (episode 3)	
2021	Delayed Justice	Heo Sung-yoon	Cameo ( episode 18–20)	
2021	Over To You	Dong-suk		
2021	The Road: The Tragedy of One	Yoon Dong-pil		
2021	Police University	Kwon Hyuk-pil		
2022	The Driver		Cameo	
2022	Bad Prosecutor	Jin Kang-woo	Cameo	
2023	Our Blooming Youth	King		
2026	One-of-a-Kind Romance †	Yu-il's father	Cameo	

=== Web series ===
Year	Title	Role	Notes	Ref.
2014	One Sunny Day	Young-ho		

=== Television shows ===
Year	Title	Role	Notes	Ref.
2012	Jungle Love	Voice narration		
2013	Dad! Where Are We Going?	Cast Member	Reality show with his son Lee Joon-soo	
2014	Dad! Where Are We Going? Season 2	Voice narration		
2016	Battle Trip	Contestant	with Kim Min-kyo and Im Hyung-joon (episodes 9–10)	
2021–2022	Liberation Town	Cast Member	episode 1–34	
2021	Drinking Guys	Host		
2021–2022	General Meeting of Shareholders	Host		
2022	Hot Singers	Cast Member		
2022	Now, Follow Me	Cast Member	with Lee Jun-soo	
2022	Golf Battle: Birdie Buddies	Contestant	Season 4	
2023	The Power of Superfoods	Storyteller		

=== Music video appearances ===
Year	Song title	Artist
2013	"Open the Door"	Im Chang-jung

== Theater ==
Year	Title	Role	Ref.
2001	The Threepenny Opera		
2001	Blood Brothers		
2003	Oh! Happy Day		
2003	Liar		
2003	19 and 80	Harold	
2006	Dracula	Dracula	
2008	Singles	Su-heon	
2009	Rain Man	Charlie Babbitt	
2011	200 Pounds Beauty	Han Sang-jun	
2012	Le Passe-Muraille	Dusoleil	
2013	Le Passe-Muraille	Dusoleil	
2014	Chicago	Billy Flynn	
2014	Le Passe-Muraille	Dusoleil	
2022–2023	42nd Street	Julian Marsh	

== Discography ==
=== Soundtrack appearances ===
Year	Song title	Notes
2006	"Ae soo"	Hello, God OST

== Awards and nominations ==
Year presented, name of the award ceremony, award category, nominated work and the result of the nomination
Year	Award	Category	Nominated work	Result
2001	Seoul Performing Arts Festival	Best New Actor		Won
2008	KBS Drama Awards	Excellence Award, Actor in a Miniseries	Formidable Rivals	Nominated
2010	KBS Drama Awards	Top Excellence Award, Actor	Marry Me Please, The Slave Hunters	Nominated
2010	KBS Drama Awards	Excellence Award, Actor in a Daily Drama	Marry Me Please	Nominated
2011	KBS Drama Awards	Best Actor in a One-Act/Special Drama	Yeongdeok Women's Wrestling Team	Nominated
2012	Herald DongA TV Lifestyle Awards	Best Dressed	—N/a	Won
2012	SBS Drama Awards	Special Acting Award, Actor in a Weekend/Daily Drama	A Gentleman's Dignity	Won
2013	MBC Entertainment Awards	Star of the Year	Dad! Where Are We Going?	Won
2014	MBC Drama Awards	Best Actor in a Drama Short	Turning Point	Nominated
2015	MBC Drama Awards	Top Excellence Award, Actor in a Special Project Drama	Flower of Queen	Nominated
2019	MBC Drama Awards	Top Excellence Award, Actor in a Wednesday-Thursday Miniseries	Spring Turns to Spring	Nominated
2020	SBS Drama Awards	Excellence Award, Actor in a Miniseries Genre/Action Drama	Good Casting	Nominated
