= Green Rose =

- Promotional poster
- Genre: Action; Romance; Frameup; Drama; Suspense
- Written by: Yoo Hyun-mi; Kim Doo-sam
- Directed by: Kim Soo-ryong; Kim Jin-geun
- Starring: Go Soo; Lee Da-hae; Lee Jong-hyuk; Kim Seo-hyung
- Composer: Choi Kyung-sik
- Country of origin: South Korea
- Original language: Korean
- No. of episodes: 22

Production
- Executive producer: Kim Young-sup (SBS)
- Producers: Kim Dong-rae; Yoon Ha-rim; Baek Kwang-hyeon
- Production locations: Seoul, Shanghai
- Running time: 60 minutes
- Production company: HUE Entertainment

Original release
- Network: SBS TV
- Release: 19 March – 29 May 2005

Related
- Green Rose (Philippines); Innocent Defendant

Green Rose (Korean: 그린로즈) is a 2005 South Korean television series that aired on SBS from 19 March to 29 May 2005 on Saturdays and Sundays at 21:45 for 22 episodes. Starring Go Soo, Lee Da-hae, Lee Jong-hyuk and Kim Seo-hyung, Green Rose interweaves romance into a story of revenge to offer a fascinating drama. This is the reunion of Lotus Flower Fairy cast members Lee Da-hae, Jung Hye-sun, and Han Jin-hee and Some cast members Go Soo and Kang Shin-il. This is also the first project of Lee Da-hae with SBS and the 2nd telenovela shot in South Korea and Shanghai, China after KBS2 romcom series Full House.

== Plot ==
Lee Jung-hyun (Go Soo) and Oh Soo-ah (Lee Da-hae) are living a normal life as a couple until it is revealed that Soo-ah is actually the daughter of Oh Byung-moo (Han Jin-hee), chairman of SR Electronics, the very company he works at. Shocked and hurt that Soo-ah wasn't honest with him, Jung-hyun tries to break up with her but she convinces him to give their relationship another chance. One night, Jung-hyun is summoned to the chairman's vacation house. Inside, Jung-hyun finds the chairman and the housekeeper both on the floor, the former unconscious and the latter dead. When Jung-hyun attempts to carry the chairman out of the house, a fire is started and Jung-hyun is knocked out. After the evidence points to Jung-hyun as the main suspect, he is sentenced to life imprisonment. To give her son a chance to get out of jail and prove his innocence, his mother kills herself. Cornered by policemen and the SWAT team after a long and exhausting car chase, Jung-hyun jumps off a bridge.

Believed to be dead by everyone, he flees to Shanghai, China where he struggles to survive. He suffers much, homeless and begging from strangers or scavenging garbage cans for food. Time passes and he meets a Korean man named Lee Choon-bok (Park Sang-myun) who eventually becomes his good friend and guardian who takes good care of him like his own brother and son. He also finds Cha Yoo-ran (Kim Seo-hyung), the chairman's secretary and ex-lover of SR Director Shin Hyun-tae (Lee Jong-hyuk). Yoo-ran decides to help him after Shin orders some men to dispatch her. Under the guidance of Chen Daren, a Chinese business tycoon whose life he and his friends had saved from an assassination attempt, Jung-hyun develops acute business skills and becomes chairman of Super Digital Enterprise, a large Chinese company. After three years, he (under the alias Zhang Zhongyuan), Yoo-ran and Choon-bok return to Korea (wherein upon their return, Jung-hyun still remained under the care of his guardian Choonbok like they were in China) to help him discover the truth and punish the people who framed him. Soo-ah, who is dating Shin Hyun-tae upon his return, immediately sees through his Zhang Zhongyuan facade and recognizes him as Jung-hyun himself. With the help of Soo-ah, guardian Choon-bok and his best friend Kim Dong-wook (Jung Sang-hoon), he discovers that Shin is the person who tried to kill Soo-ah's father. Secretly desiring Soo-ah for years, he also framed Jung-hyun to have her all to himself. Director Seo (Sunwoo Jae-duk), who witnessed the crime, is the man who had hit Jung-hyun on the head and attempted to kill the chairman as well. In the end, Jung-hyun is able to successfully clear his name and Director Seo and Shin commit suicide. He and Soo-ah happily reunite.

== Cast ==
=== Main characters ===
- Go Soo as Lee Jung-hyun/Zhang Zhongyuan
- Lee Da-hae as Oh Soo-ah
- Lee Jong-hyuk as Director Shin Hyun-tae
- Kim Seo-hyung as Cha Yoo-ran

=== Supporting characters ===
- Sunwoo Jae-duk as Managing Director Seo
- Jung Sang-hoon as Kim Dong-wook
- Zhang Kang'er as Chen Daren
- Park Sang-myun as Lee Choon-bok (Jung-hyun's friend and guardian)
- Han Jin-hee as Chairman Oh Byung-moo
- Seo Jin-ah as Hong So-ra (older adoptive sister of Soo-ah)
- Yoo Seo-jin as Soo-ah's best friend
- Lee Won-jae as Yoo Kwang-il
- Sung Dong-il as Jung Taek-soo
- Kang Shin-il as Investigator Jo
- Choi Sang-hoon as Prosecutor Oh
- Yoo Jung-ki as Prison Guard Ahn
- Jang Hoon as Investigator Kim
- Lee Seung-ho as Chief Judge
- Byun Hee-bong as Prosecutor Jung
- Yoo Min-hyuk as Taoren (Jung-hyun and Choon-bok's Chinese bodyguard)
- Jung Hye-sun as Han Myung-sook (Jung-hyun's mother)
- Kim Ji-young as Park Soon-nyeo

== Remake ==
The Philippines produced their own version of this series, which aired on ABS-CBN in 2011. The remake starred Jericho Rosales as Jerome Delgado (Lee Jung-hyun/Zhang Zhongyuan), Anne Curtis as Angela Tuazon (Oh Soo-ah), Jake Cuenca as Edward Fuentebuella (Shin Hyun-tae) and Alessandra de Rossi as Geena Rallos (Cha Yoo-ran). What's interesting in the names of characters in adaptation is that most of the surnames used here are owned by Philippine scouts who died in their journey to 11th Jamboree, e.g.: Delgado, De Guia, Fuentebella, Rallos, Reyes, Tuazon, etc. (See 11th World Scout Jamboree Memorial Rotonda and 11th World Scout Jamboree)

== See also ==
- Korean drama
- List of South Korean television series
