= 銀河 =

銀河 or 银河, meaning "galaxy, Milky Way", may refer to:

- Galaxy Award (银河奖), China's science fiction award
- Ginga, a Japanese overnight train
- SL Ginga (SL銀河), a Japanese excursion train
- Unha (은하), North Korean space launch rocket

== See also ==
- The dictionary definition of 銀 at Wiktionary
- The dictionary definition of 银 at Wiktionary
- The dictionary definition of 河 at Wiktionary
- Galaxy (disambiguation)
- Ginga (disambiguation)
- Milky Way (disambiguation)
- Tianhe (disambiguation)
- Unha (disambiguation)
- 群星 (disambiguation)
