= Summer Breeze =

Summer Breeze may refer to:

- Summer Breeze (Seals and Crofts album), 1972
  - "Summer Breeze" (song), the title song, also covered by The Isley Brothers and others
- Summer Breeze (Miho Nakayama album), 1986
- Summer Breeze (TV series), a 1987 American single-episode pilot
- Summerbreeze, a 2000 compilation produced by DJ Tiësto
- "Summer Breeze", a single by Lords of Lyrics from their 1996 album Heaven or Hell
- "Summer Breeze", a song by SF9, 2020
- "Summer Breeze", a song by Chris Brown from Heartbreak on a Full Moon, 2017

== Music festivals ==
- Summer Breeze Open Air, an annual heavy metal festival in Germany
- Summer Breeze Festival UK, an annual music festival in the United Kingdom
- Summer Breeze (rock festival), a cancelled 2008 rock festival planned for Seoul, South Korea
- Summer Breeze Festival (California), a former R&B festival

== Social dance festivals ==
- Summer Breeze NL, a weekly Latin dance social festival during the summer period in Amsterdam, Holland

== See also ==
- Breeze (disambiguation)
- Summer (disambiguation)
- "Summer Wind", a 1965 song
