= He Tian =

He Tian or Hetian may refer to:

== Places ==
- Hotan (pinyin romanisation: Hetian), county-level city in Xinjiang, China
- Hotan County, Hotan Prefecture, Xinjiang, China
- Hotan Prefecture, Xinjiang, China

== People ==
- Duke Tai of Tian Qi (died 384 BCE), personal name Tian He (Western naming order: He Tian), ruler of Qi during the Warring States period
- Tang Yongshu (born 1975), badminton player who competed for Australia under the name He Tian Tang

== Other uses ==
- He Tian, a fictional character in the Chinese television series Unruly Qiao

== See also ==
- Tian He (disambiguation)
- Tian (disambiguation)
- He (disambiguation)
