= Koreans in Venezuela =

Ethnic group

Koreans in Venezuela Coreanos en Venezuela 한국계 베네수엘라인 재베네수엘라 한국인
Total population
- 1,000 (2016)

Regions with significant populations
- Caracas, Puerto La Cruz

Languages
- Venezuelan Spanish, Korean

Related ethnic groups
- Korean diaspora

Koreans in Venezuela (also known as Korean Venezuelans) form one of the smallest Korean communities in Latin America, according to the statistics of South Korea's Ministry of Foreign Affairs and Trade.

== History ==
The South Korean community in Venezuela began when Chiong Hoe-Nyun, who studied the Spanish language at the Hankuk University of Foreign Studies (HUFS) in Seoul, migrated to Maracaibo in the early 1960s. Immigration from South Korea increased with Venezuela's economic prosperity in the 1970s, and a South Korean embassy opened in Caracas in 1973. There were 300 South Koreans living in Venezuela as of 2011.

== Culture ==
Since 2010, Korean culture has acquired some interest from the young Venezuelan community, which has been helped by support from the local South Korean community. The South Korean embassy in Caracas and several cultural organizations such as Asociación Venezolana de la Cultura Coreana (AVCC) and Unión de Amantes de Corea (UAC) have promoted numerous events in honor to promote K-pop/K-rock music and Korean cinema, cuisine, drama, language, and art in Venezuela. The Festival Hallyu, which promotes Korean culture, has sent Venezuelans to compete in the K-Pop World Festival.

=== Sport ===
Taekwondo was brought to Venezuela between 1968 and 1970 by three South Korean teachers: Howo Kan in the Capital District, Cho Kon in Carabobo, and Hong Ki Kim in Anzoategui. Since then, the sport has gained popularity in Venezuela and the country has accumulated major singles titles, making itself one of the world leaders in Taekwondo during the 1980s and 1990s.
