= 群星 =

群星 means 'galaxy' in Chinese. It may refer to:

- Qunxing Paper (群星纸业), a Chinese paper manufacturer
- Qunxing Village (群星村), a village in Lijingpu Subdistrict, Ningxiang, Hunan, China
- Qunxing Village (群星村), a former village in what is today Chengdong Village, Rongjiawan, Yueyang, Hunan, China
- Stars Gathering (群星會), singing variety show that has been broadcast by Taiwan Television Enterprise, Ltd.
- The Stars, a Chinese novel by Qi Yue that won a 2020 Chinese Nebula Award

== See also ==
- The dictionary definition of 群 at Wiktionary
- The dictionary definition of 星 at Wiktionary
- Galaxy (disambiguation)
- 銀河 (disambiguation)
