= Tianhe =

Tianhe or Tian He, may refer to:

== Locations in China ==
- Tianhe District (天河区), in Guangzhou, Guangdong
- Wuhan Tianhe International Airport (武汉天河国际机场), Hubei
- Tianhe, Guangxi (天河镇), a town in Luocheng Mulao Autonomous County, Guangxi

=== Subdistricts ===
- Tianhe Subdistrict, Weihai (田和街道), in Huancui District, Weihai, Shandong
- Tianhe Subdistrict (天河街道), Chaohu, Anhui
- Tianhe Subdistrict, Wuhan (天河街道), in Huangpi District, Wuhan, Hubei
- Tianhe Subdistrict, Wenzhou (天河街道), in Longwan District, Wenzhou, Zhejiang

== Other uses ==
- Tianhe core module (天和, "Harmony of heaven"), the core module of the Chinese Tiangong Space Station
- Tianhe-1 and Tianhe-2, supercomputers built by China
- Duke Tai of Tian Qi (died 384 BC), personal name Tian He, ruler of Qi during the Warring States period
- The Galaxy on Earth, a 2014 Chinese film
- HE Tian (Tian He), a fictional character from Unruly Qiao
- Yun Tianhe (雲天河), fictional character in the video game The Legend of Sword and Fairy 4
- Tianhe (天河, "heavenly river"), an archaic Chinese name for the Milky Way Galaxy
- Yokosuka Tenga (天河), proposal to provide the Imperial Japanese Navy

== See also ==
- He Tian (disambiguation)
- Tian (disambiguation)
- He (disambiguation)
