= Ginga =

Ginga may refer to:

== Japanese ==
In Japanses Ginga (銀河) means "galaxy" and can be found in:

=== TV ===
- Ginga (middleware), a Japanese-Brazilian digital TV middleware

==== Series ====
- Ginga: Nagareboshi Gin (known in English as Silver Fang), a Japanese manga/anime series from the 1980s
- Ultraman Ginga, a Japanese 2013 tokusatsu series created by Tsuburaya Productions

==== Characters ====
- Ginga Hagane, from Beyblade: Metal Fusion
- Ginga Nakajima, from Magical Girl Lyrical Nanoha StrikerS

=== Trains ===
- Ginga (train), a Japanese overnight train
- SL Ginga, a Japanese excursion train

=== Other ===
- "Ginga" (single), a 2005 single from Japanese rock band Fujifabric
- Yokosuka P1Y Ginga, a Japanese bomber aircraft
- Ginga (satellite), an astronomical satellite

== Other uses ==
- Ginga (capoeira), a style of footwork used in the martial art capoeira
- Ginga Scout, a location-based soccer application

== See also ==
- Ginger
