= Daegu International Opera Festival =

Music festival in Daegu, South Korea

- Hangul: 대구국제오페라축제
- Hanja: 大邱國際오페라祝祭
- RR: Daegu gukje opera chukje
- MR: Taegu kukche op'era ch'ukche

Daegu International Opera Festival (DIOF) is a festival that is held in Daegu, South Korea. The festival takes place in mid October. However, the 16th DIOF commenced in September. Alongside grand opera performances, there are a host of programs in DIOF such as back stage tour, square opera, Opera Odessey (free lectures regarding opera), pre-concert, lucky seats etc.

== History ==
Daegu International Opera Festival (DIOF) is the representative music festival in South Korea and is the largest International Opera Festival in Asia. The festival has accomplished an enormous growth since its commencement. DIOF continuously endeavors to culturally enlighten people. Moreover, it functions as an Asian cultural hub by bringing various high quality foreign productions. DIOF may be the only chance to enjoy a lot of rare combinations of renowned artists.

== See also ==
- Daegu Opera House
- List of opera festivals
- List of music festivals in South Korea
- List of classical music festivals
