= K-Pop World Festival =

Annual K-pop talent competition

K-POP World Festival
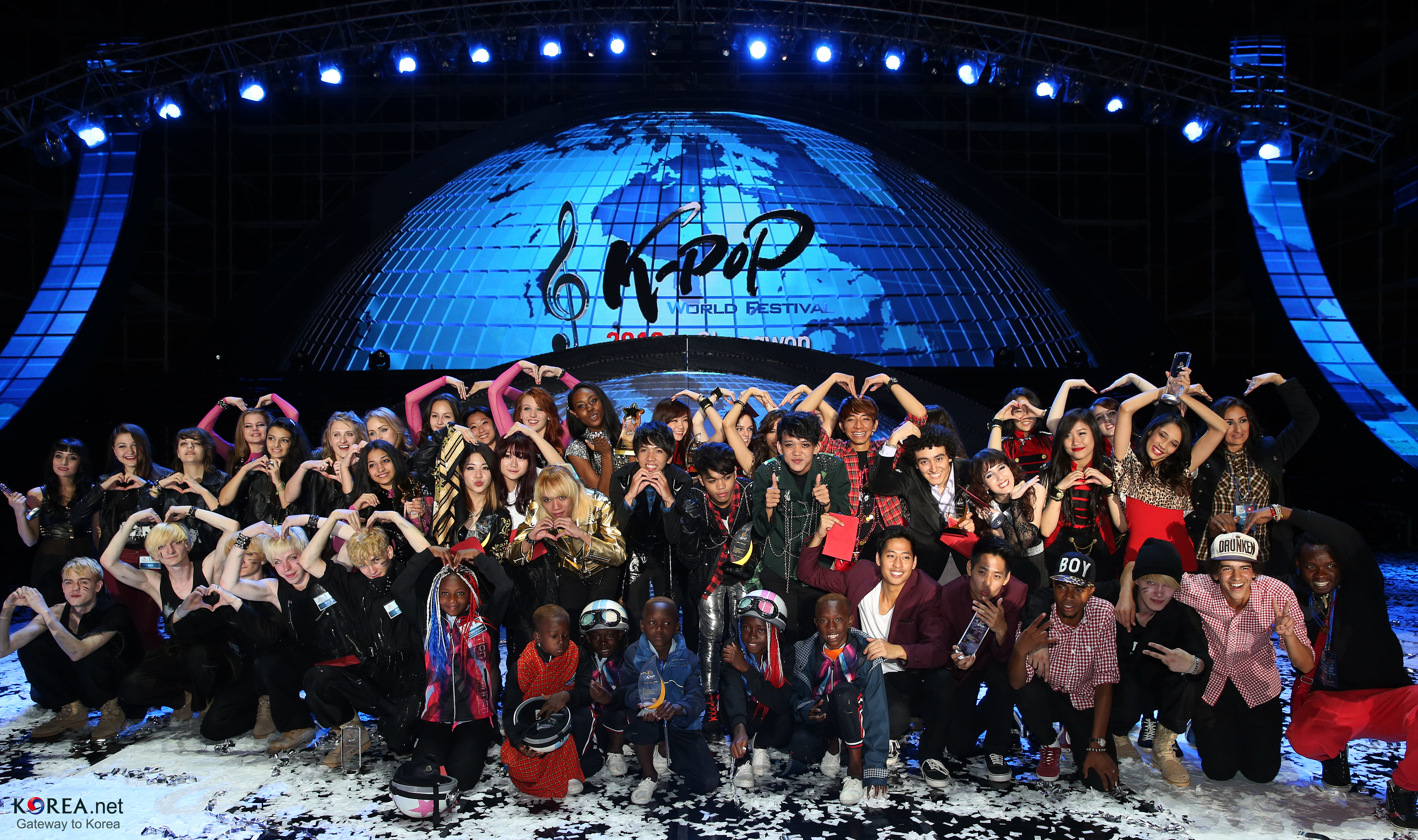
- 2013 contestant group photo
- Genre: K-pop
- Locations: Changwon, South Korea
- Years active: 2011–present
- Website: k-popworldfestival.kbs.co.kr

The K-POP World Festival is an annual K-pop talent competition organized by South Korea's Ministry of Foreign Affairs with the support of numerous government agencies. After going through a few preliminary rounds, fans of K-pop are invited by the South Korean government to take part in the final round of the competition held every year in Changwon, South Korea.

== Background ==
The event is organized by South Korea's Ministry of Foreign Affairs with the support from various state agencies including:

- The Ministry of Culture, Sports and Tourism (MCST)
- The Korean Broadcasting System (KBS)
- Overseas diplomatic missions and embassies of South Korea

According to the organizers, the purpose of the event is to bring Hallyu fans from all over the world to South Korea, thereby fusing the culture of Korea with the cultures of various countries from all over the world.

In an effort to make the event one where Korean culture comes together with cultures of participants, those who reinterpret or rearrange K-Pop by fusing it with their traditional music or instrument sounds, will be given extra points.

— Ministry of Foreign Affairs and Trade

== Timeline ==
=== 2011 ===
The preliminary competition was hosted in 16 countries with more than 30,000 applicants and over 10,000 fans attending the December 7 finals in Changwon. Boy group JAM from Kazakhstan who performed Shinee's Ring Ding Dong won the performance grand prize while solo performer Karla Carreon from Philippine who performed Yumi's Star won the vocals grand prize. Guest performers included T-ara, Secret, Sistar, K.Will, Boyfriend, MBLAQ, Infinite and CNBLUE.

Region	Country	Performer	Award	Ref
Central Asia	Kazakhstan	JAM	Grand Prize – Performance	
Southeast Asia	Philippines	Karla Carreon	Grand Prize – Vocals	

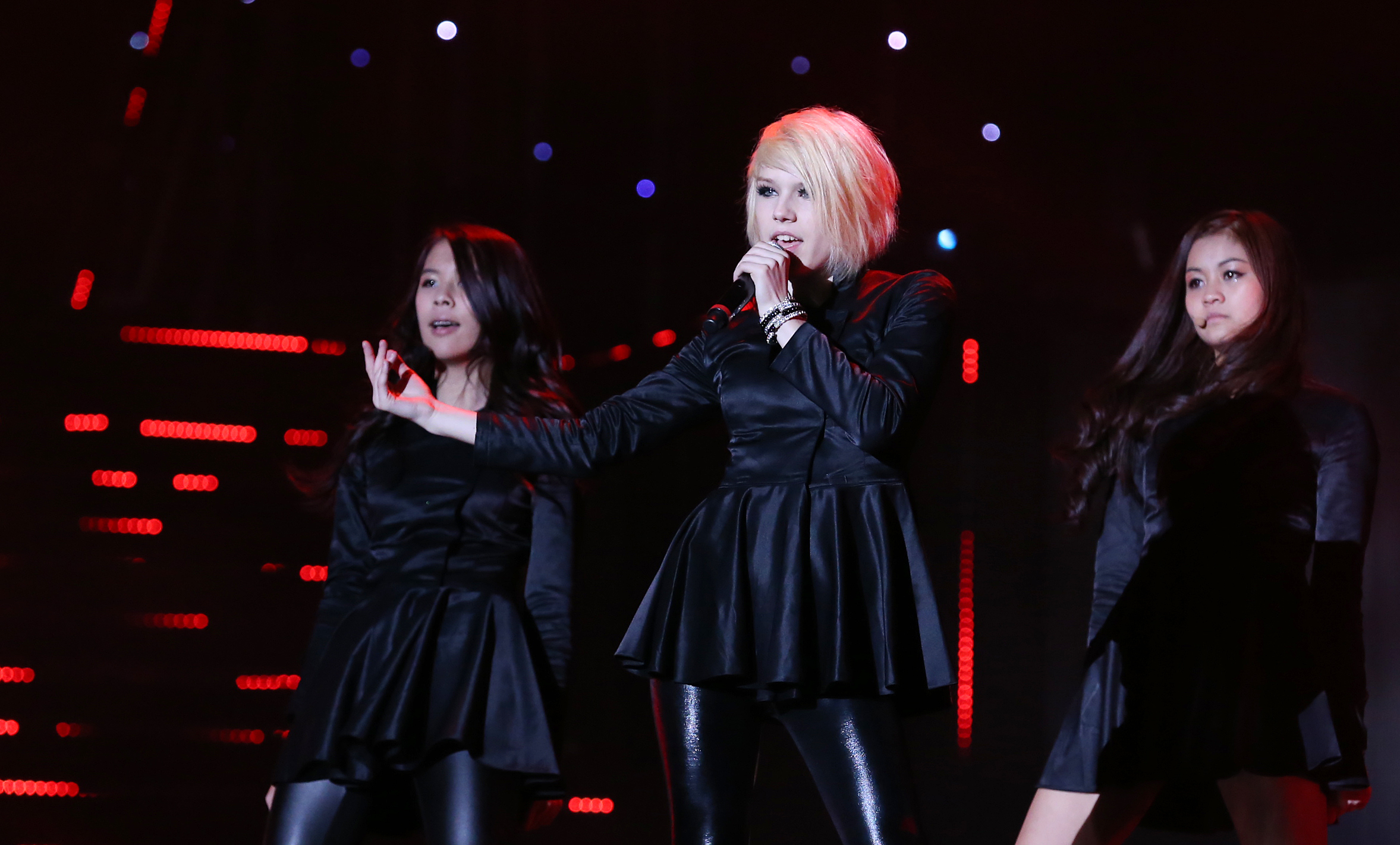
Fan contest winner 2012, Czech Republic's O.M.G.

=== 2012 ===
The competition was hosted in 33 countries before finals on October 28. Girl group O.M.G. from who performed Girl Generation medley won the performance grand prize. According to the Embassy of Czech Republic in Seoul, the Ambassador, Jaroslav Olša, Jr., personally congratulated them on winning the contest. The group received a CD containing a South Korean adaptation of a famous Czech musical. Duo from Indonesia, Nadya and Marwah who performed Sistar 19's Ma Boy won the vocals grand prize. Guest performers included TVXQ, Secret, MBLAQ, F.T. Island, B.A.P and Apink.

Region	Country	Performer	Award	Ref
Eastern Europe	Czech Republic	O.M.G.	Grand Prize – Performance	
Southeast Asia	Indonesia	Nadya & Marwah	Grand Prize – Vocals	

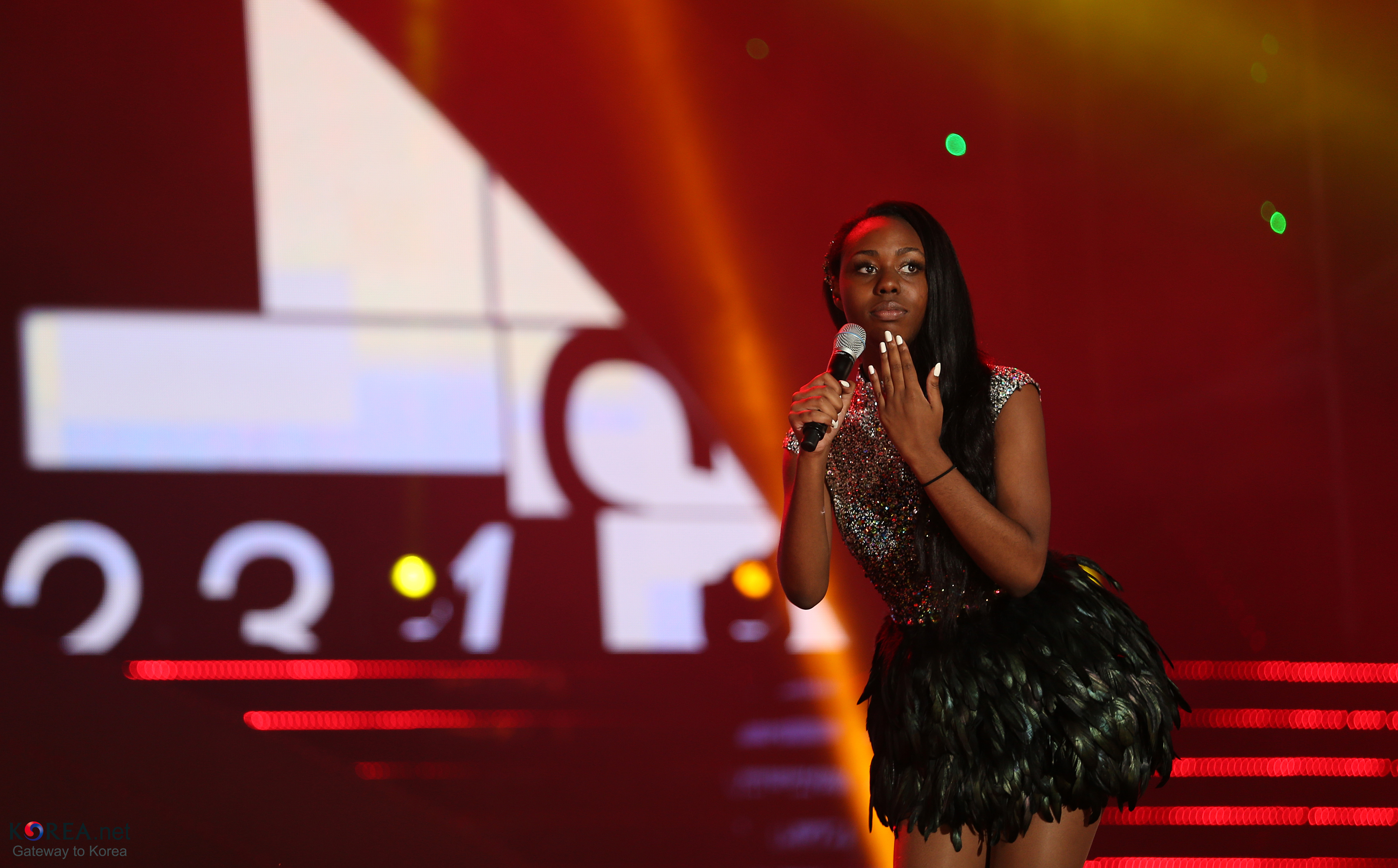
Fan contest winner 2013, U.S.A.'s Arnelle "Elly" Nonon.

=== 2013 ===
The competition was hosted in 58 cities from 43 nations, with more than 60,000 applicants, and over 25,000 fans attending the October 20 finals in Changwon. Performance grand prizes were awarded to girl group Alladin from Uzbekistan who performed Miss A's Bad Girl Good Girl and vocals grand prize were awarded to solo performer Arnelle Nonon from the U.S. who performed Lee Hi's "1,2,3,4". Guest performers included Miss A, EXO, Rainbow, Infinite and B.A.P.

Region	Country	Performer	Award	Ref
Central Asia	Uzbekistan	Alladin	Grand Prize – Performance	
North America	United States	Arnelle "Elly" Nonon	Grand Prize – Vocals	

=== 2014 ===
The preliminary competition was hosted in 70 countries before the finals on October 19 in Changwon. Overall grand prize were awarded to girl group GGC Crew from Ireland who performed Girls' Generation's I Got A Boy. The performance grand prize were awarded to a group from Finland High Definition who performed BTS's Boy In Luv while a team from Japan, Flashy who performed Ailee's I Will Show You won the vocals grand prize. Guest performers included EXO-K, B.A.P, Block B, IU, Sistar and Apink.

Award

Award	Contestant	Country	Song	Original Artist	Ref
Grand Prize - Overall	GGC Crew	Ireland	I Got A Boy	Girls' Generation	
Grand Prize - Performance	High Definition	Finland	Boy In Luv	BTS	
Grand Prize - Vocals	Flashy	Japan	I Will Show You	Ailee	

==== Other Contestant ====
These contestants didn't win an award, but they did perform and represent their country:

Contestant	Country	Act	Song	Original Artist
Vi.RUS	Russia	Vocal	Come Back Home	2NE1
Double The Fire	USA	Vocal	Ice	Akdong Musician
X-Junior	Laos	Performance	Overdose	Exo
Natalie Turjeman	Israel	Vocal	It's Alright, It's Love	Davichi
R2E	Greece	Vocal	You Don't Love Me	Spica
Helena Dimmel	Austria	Vocal	Who You?	G-Dragon
Prism	UK	Performance	One Shot	B.A.P
Filipa Cardoso	Portugal	Vocal	Lonely	2NE1
Effe(x)tion	Czech Republic	Performance	Red Light	f(x)
Inseong	Mexico	Vocal	Eyes, Nose, Lips	Taeyang
Ochirbat.B	Mongolia	Vocal	Moon of Seoul	Roy Kim
Level Two	Chile	Performance	Ringa Linga	Taeyang

=== 2015 ===
Awards

The Pacific Starz of Nigeria won the overall Grand Prize of 12 Million South Korean Won ($12,000). The group led by Praise Nelson and made up of 5 members, performed the BTS song Danger.

Award	Contestant	Country	Act	Song	Original Artist
Grand Prize	Pacific Starz	Nigeria	Performance	Danger	BTS
Excellent Performance	Epsilon Kueen	Malaysia	Performance	Voodoo Doll	VIXX
Excellent Performance	Ryan	Mexico	Vocal	Love Song	Rain
Best Performance	Nonlas	Vietnam	Performance	Ah Yeah	EXID
Best Performance	Rebecca Strachan	UK	Vocal	If	Taeyeon
Audience Favorite	Censored	Finland	Performance	Call Me Baby	Exo
Audience Favorite	Crystal	Uruguay	Vocal	Lonely	2NE1

==== Other Contestant ====
These contestants didn't win an award, but they did perform and represent their country:

Contestant	Country	Act	Song	Original Artist
Pepero	Australia	Performance	Mamma Mia	KARA
VxZ	Philippines	Performance	Joah	Jay Park
Xplicit	Ecuador	Performance	Don't Tease Me	SPEED
Belleame	Japan	Vocal	Who you?	G-Dragon
Seoul Beat	Romania	Performance	Crazy	4Minute
MAZE	Morocco	Performance	Shake It	Sistar

=== 2016 ===
==== Scoring system ====
70%	Judges Choice (DJ Koo, Kim Jo Han, Seo In Young & Black Eyed Pilesung)
20%	Local Choice
10%	Global Vote (By TvuT App)

==== Award ====
Award	Contestant	Country	Song	Original Artist
1st Place Grand Award (Daesang)	Britaney Chanel	United States	U&I	Ailee
2nd Place Performance	Supreme Task	Nigeria	Fire	BTS
2nd Place Vocal	KARMA	Italy	Mr Ambitious	Mamamoo
3rd Place Performance	TOXIC$	Sweden	Cheer Up	Twice
3rd Place Vocal	Priyanka Mazumdar	India	You & I	Park Bom
Popularity Award I	M2D	Russia	Ringa Linga	Taeyang
Popularity Award II	4Divas	Hungary	4 Walls	f(x)

==== Other Contestant ====
These contestants didn't win an award, but they did perform and represent their country:

Contestant	Country	Act	Song	Original Artist
FUXION	Malaysia	Performance	Fly	Got7
LGND	Mexico	Performance	This Love	Shinhwa
ABsunit	Israel	Vocal	Dumb & Dumber	iKON
KRYPTONITE	Indonesia	Performance	Stuck	Monsta X
Yumagichi Yada & Koroko Richama	Japan	Vocal	Person Love	Kim Bum Soo & Lena Park
Mongolian Namja	Nepal	Performance	Monster	Exo
WINK	China	Performance	I Like That	Sistar
Lotus	Vietnam	Performance	Rough	GFriend

=== 2017 ===
Guest Performances was done by BTS, Monsta X, Twice, Ailee, NCT 127, J Black, Astro

Award

Award	Contestant	Country	Act	Song	Original Artist
Grand Prize	TiffaniAfifa & Alphiandi	Indonesia	Vocal	Inferiority Complex	Park Kyung & Eunha
Best Performance	Immortals Army	India	Performance	Blood, Sweat & Tears	BTS
Best Vocal	Akif	Singapore	Vocal	Eyes, Nose & Lips	Taeyang
Excellent Performance	One Piece	Canada	Performance	Not Today	BTS
Excellent Vocal	Sinem Kadioğlu	Turkey	Vocal	I Will Go To You Like The First Snow	Ailee
Audience Favourite Award	KINGSMAN	Malaysia	Performance	White Night	Up10tion
Audience Favourite Award	Ana Lucia	Peru	Vocal	I Will Show You	Ailee
Twitter Popular Choice Award	Sinem Kadioğlu	Turkey	Vocal	I Will Go To You Like The First Snow	Ailee

Other Contestant

These contestants didn't win an award, but they did perform and represent their country:

Contestant	Country	Act	Song	Original Artist
Antsa	Madagascar	Vocal	Come Back Home	2NE1
PartyHard	Russia	Performance	Hobgoblin	CLC
I.V.	USA	Performance	Boombayah	Blackpink
R3DSEVEN	Hungary	Performance	Catch Me If You Can	Girls' Generation
Oops Crew!	Vietnam	Performance	Don't Wanna Cry	Seventeen
Fragiles Dance Crew	Nigeria	Performance	Hard Carry	GOT7

=== 2018 ===
Due to the Kong-Rey Typhoon this is the first time the performance was without an audience and with a special guest performer (even Stray Kids presenting the award). This is also the first time for the competition with a new concept of the "Bracket System" From 6 different category. In addition 2 Special Prizes which is "Grand Award (Daesang)" & "People`s Choice Award". In 2020 an academic article about this Changwon Festival focused on the 2018 contest was published in the journal Transactions of the Royal Asiatic Society Korea Branch.

Award	Winner	Country
Grand Prize (대상)	K-BOY	Thailand
People's Choice Award (인기상)	Lindsay Ketlego Setkena	South Africa

Song & Original Artist	Contestant	Country	Result	Category	Result	Country	Contestant	Song & Original Artist
Callin' By A.C.E	TOXIC	Bulgaria	LOSE	Best Boy Group Performance	WIN	Thailand	K-BOY	Burn It Up By Wanna One
Ddu Du Ddu Du By Blackpink	LIMITLESS	Cuba	LOSE	Best Girl Crush Performance	WIN	Ukraine	LEVEL UP	District 9 By Stray Kids
Danger By Taemin	Lindsay Ketlego Setkena	South Africa	LOSE	Best Solo Performance	WIN	Bangladesh	Shefa Tabassum	Gashina By Sunmi
Catch Me By TVXQ	MONStar	Uzbekistan	LOSE	Best Composition Performance	WIN	United States	HARU	Be Natural By Red Velvet (Feat Taeyong Of NCT)
Mic Drop (Steve Aoki Remix) By BTS	BNX	Ethiopia	LOSE	Best BTS Performance	WIN	Canada	East2West	Blood Sweat & Tears By BTS
Melted By Akdong Musician	UNICA	Poland	LOSE	Best Vocal Performance	WIN	France	Kevin Preisser	Red Flavor By Red Velvet

=== 2019 ===
- Host : Lee Hwi-jae, DinDin & Lia (Itzy)
- Special Performance : Monsta X, TXT, Itzy, The Boyz, Momoland & Red Velvet

==== Judging Score ====
Criteria	Percentage
Training Score	30%
Judging Score	70%

- Training Score Are Score That Achieve During Their Training Before The Show
- Judging Score Are Score That They Got During The Show (Judges : JeA (Brown Eyed Girls), Changmin & Bae Yoon Jung )
- For The First Time Ever The Dance Act & Vocal Act Are Combined Together.

==== Awards ====
Award	Winner	Country
Grand Prize (대상)	Sodem Solana	Ireland
Top Achievement Award	Limelight	Canada
Top Achievement Award	Mint Crew	United States
Excellence Award	Josephine Hung	Singapore
Excellence Award	Omega Evo	Madagascar
Friendship Award	Omega Evo	Madagascar

- The Friendship Award is based on staff choice.

==== List of competitors ====
No	Name (Individual/Group)	Country	Song	Original Artist
1.	The Bratz	Spain	Kill This Love	Blackpink
2.	MDC	New Zealand	Crown	TXT
3.	Limelight	Canada	Butterfly	Loona
4.	BtoK	Germany	Egotistic	Mamamoo
5.	MINT Crew	United States	Shoot Out	Monsta X
6.	LTX	Cuba	Hala Hala	Ateez
7.	Josephine Hung	Singapore	Room Shaker	Ailee
8.	OMG	Cambodia	Fancy + Love Shot + Fire	Twice + Exo + BTS
9.	Alyona Tyo	Kazakhstan	Gotta Go	Chungha
10.	Pulse	Australia	Under Cover	A.C.E
11.	Sodem Solana	Ireland	Solo	Jennie
12.	Al-Shamari Ali Mhannaa	Kuwait	Yanghwa Bridge	Zion.T
13.	Omega Evo	Madagascar	Idol	BTS

=== 2021 ===
- Theme : How K-Pop Saved Me
- Host : Yoo In-na
- Special Performance : Aespa, Monsta X, Stray Kids, Ateez, The Boyz, Oh My Girl, Oneus & Cravity

Due to the ongoing COVID-19 pandemic, this is the second time the performance was without an audience. This is also the return of the "Bracket System" however the battle is based on the theme of nature and mainly focused on Dance Performance. In addition 2 Special Prizes was introduced which is "Best Performance" & "Best Story".

==== Judging Score ====
Criteria	Percentage
Judges Score	20%
Early Voting	20%
Live Voting	60%

==== Performances and awards ====
Award	Winner	Country
Best Performance	DX-SEVEN	Laos
Best Story	The Priest Hood	Nigeria

Song	Original Artist	Contestant	Country	Result	Theme	Result	Country	Contestant	Original Artist	Song
90's Love	NCT U	Kimberly	Canada	WIN	Tree – Growth, Dream	LOSE	Latvia	Red Cherry	Aespa	Black Mamba
Boy Meets Evil	BTS	Jungsan	Austria	WIN	Fire – Passion, Energy	LOSE	Uruguay	Rodrigo Torres	The Boyz	D.D.D
Thunderous	Stray Kids	DX-SEVEN	Laos	WIN	Soil - Harmony, Connection	LOSE	United States	GROO7E	Stray Kids	The View
Save Me	BTS	The Priest Hood	Nigeria	LOSE	Metal – Will, Power	WIN	Belarus	SAVVY	Ateez	WIN
How You Like That	Blackpink	BITCHINAS	France	WIN	Water – Creativity, Inspiration	LOSE	Russia	HipeVision	Monsta X	Gambler

== See also ==
- List of music festivals in South Korea
