= KiHa 141 series =

Japanese train type

KiHa 141
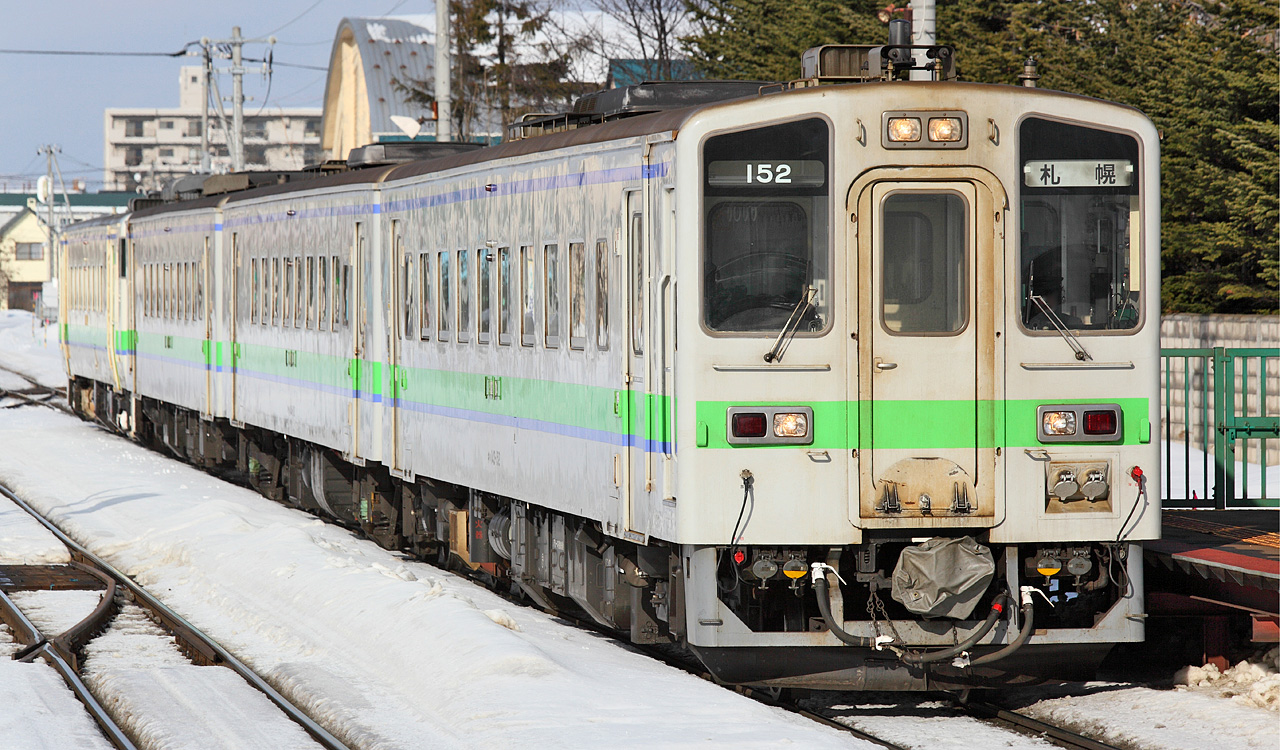
- A three-car formation in 2010
- In service: 1990-2023
- Constructed: 1990–1995
- Entered service: April 1990
- Scrapped: 2005–
- Number built: 44 vehicles
- Number in service: 22 vehicles
- Number scrapped: 8 vehicles
- Operators: JR Hokkaido (1990–2023), Myanmar Railways (2012–present)
- Depot: Naebo
- Line served: Sassho Line

Specifications
- Car body construction: Steel
- Car length: 20,000 mm (65 ft 7 in)
- Width: 2,893 mm (9 ft 5.9 in)
- Doors: 2 sliding doors per side
- Maximum speed: 95 km/h (59 mph)
- Transmission: Hydraulic
- Coupling system: Shibata
- Multiple working: KiHa 40 series
- Track gauge: 1,067 mm (3 ft 6 in)

The KiHa 141 (キハ141系) is a diesel multiple unit (DMU) train type operated by Hokkaido Railway Company (JR Hokkaido) on the Sassho Line in Japan from 1990 until 2023. The cars were rebuilt from former 50 series locomotive-hauled coaches.

The "KiHa" designation derives from the classification system used by Japanese National Railways (JNR). "Ki" indicates a diesel-powered vehicle, while "Ha" indicates an ordinary passenger car, as opposed to a green car.

== Variants ==
A total of 44 cars were built, between 1990 and 1995, divided into four main types: KiHa 141, KiHa 142, KiHa 143, and KiSaHa 144.

- KiHa 141: Single-engined cab cars, operate in conjunction with KiHa 142
- KiHa 142: Twin-engined cab cars, operate in conjunction with KiHa 141
- KiHa 143: Cab cars built 1994 with higher-rated engines
- KiSaHa 144: Non-powered intermediate cars built 1994

== KiHa 141 ==
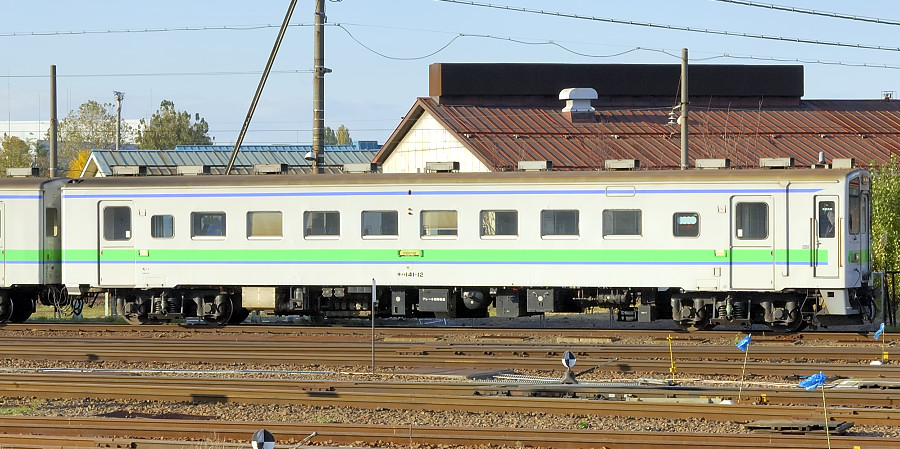
KiHa 141-12 in November 2006

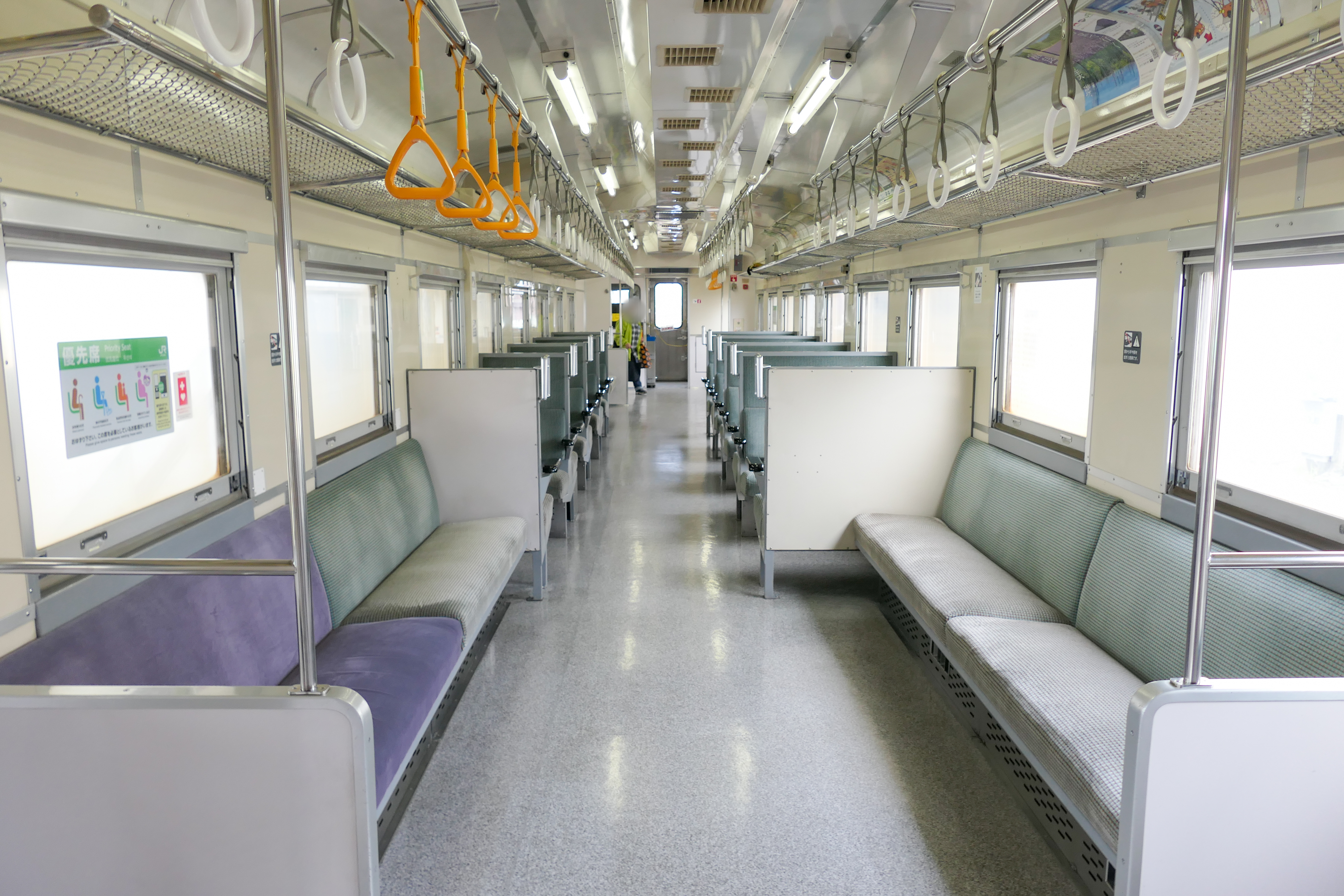
Interior of KiHa 143-101 in June 2022

14 KiHa 141 cars were built between 1990 and 1993 from surplus 50 series OHaFu 51 locomotive-hauled coaches, using the bogies and gearboxes from withdrawn KiHa 22 and KiHa 56 DMUs. These cars are formed as two-car sets with KiHa 142 cars. The KiHa 141 cars are powered by one DMF13HS 250 hp (190 kW) engine, and retain the original toilet of the 50 series coaches. These cars are not air-conditioned.

=== Build details ===
The build dates and former identities are as shown below.

Car No.	Former number	Built	Location
KiHa 141-1	OHaFu 51-44	13 March 1990	Kushiro Depot
KiHa 141-2	OHaFu 51-11	29 March 1991	Naebo Works
KiHa 141-3	OHaFu 51-46	28 March 1991	Kushiro Depot
KiHa 141-4	OHaFu 51-16	23 September 1991	Kushiro Depot
KiHa 141-5	OHaFu 51-53	20 December 1991	Kushiro Depot
KiHa 141-6	OHaFu 51-1	17 March 1992	Kushiro Depot
KiHa 141-7	OHaFu 51-47	8 February 1992	Naebo Works
KiHa 141-8	OHaFu 51-49	16 February 1992	Naebo Works
KiHa 141-9	OHaFu 51-48	10 July 1992	Kushiro Depot
KiHa 141-10	OHaFu 51-55	26 September 1992	Kushiro Depot
KiHa 141-11	OHaFu 51-12	2 February 1993	Kushiro Depot
KiHa 141-12	OHaFu 51-2	31 January 1993	Naebo Works
KiHa 141-13	OHaFu 51-5	21 February 1993	Naebo Works
KiHa 141-14	OHaFu 51-23	23 June 1993	Kushiro Depot

== KiHa 142 ==
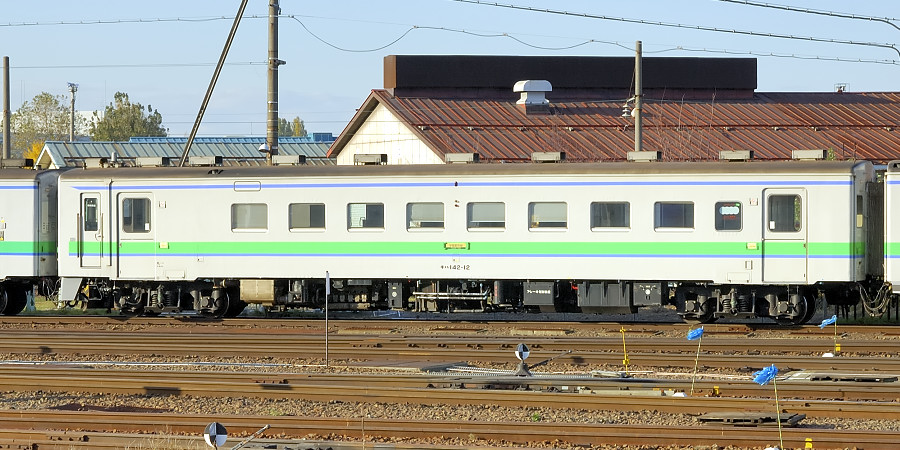
KiHa 142-12 in November 2006

15 KiHa 142 cars were built between 1990 and 1995 from surplus 50 series OHaFu 51 locomotive-hauled coaches, using the bogies and gearboxes from withdrawn KiHa 22 and KiHa 56 DMUs. These cars are formed as two-car sets with KiHa 141 cars. The KiHa 142 cars are powered by two DMF13HS 250 hp (190 kW) engines, and the original toilet of the 50 series coaches was removed during rebuilding. These cars are not air-conditioned.

KiHa 142-14 was fitted with modified passenger door control circuits in 1995 and renumbered KiHa 142-114. KiHa 142-201 was built in 1995 from former 50 series coach OHaFu 51-30 for use in conjunction with KiHa 143 cars.

=== Build details ===
The build dates and former identities are as shown below.

Car No.	Former number	Built	Location
KiHa 142-1	OHaFu 51-45	13 March 1990	Kushiro Depot
KiHa 142-2	OHaFu 51-3	29 March 1991	Naebo Works
KiHa 142-3	OHaFu 51-40	31 March 1991	Goryokaku Depot
KiHa 142-4	OHaFu 51-60	19 August 1991	Goryokaku Depot
KiHa 142-5	OHaFu 51-51	26 October 1991	Goryokaku Depot
KiHa 142-6	OHaFu 51-54	28 December 1992	Goryokaku Depot
KiHa 142-7	OHaFu 51-13	12 February 1992	Goryokaku Depot
KiHa 142-8	OHaFu 51-22	31 March 1992	Goryokaku Depot
KiHa 142-9	OHaFu 51-42	16 June 1992	Goryokaku Depot
KiHa 142-10	OHaFu 51-43	22 August 1992	Goryokaku Depot
KiHa 142-11	OHaFu 51-14	7 November 1992	Goryokaku Depot
KiHa 142-12	OHaFu 51-21	16 January 1993	Goryokaku Depot
KiHa 142-13	OHaFu 51-6	19 March 1993	Goryokaku Depot
KiHa 142-114	OHaFu 51-26	4 July 1993	Goryokaku Depot
KiHa 142-201	OHaFu 51-30	9 January 1995	Goryokaku Depot

== KiHa 143 ==
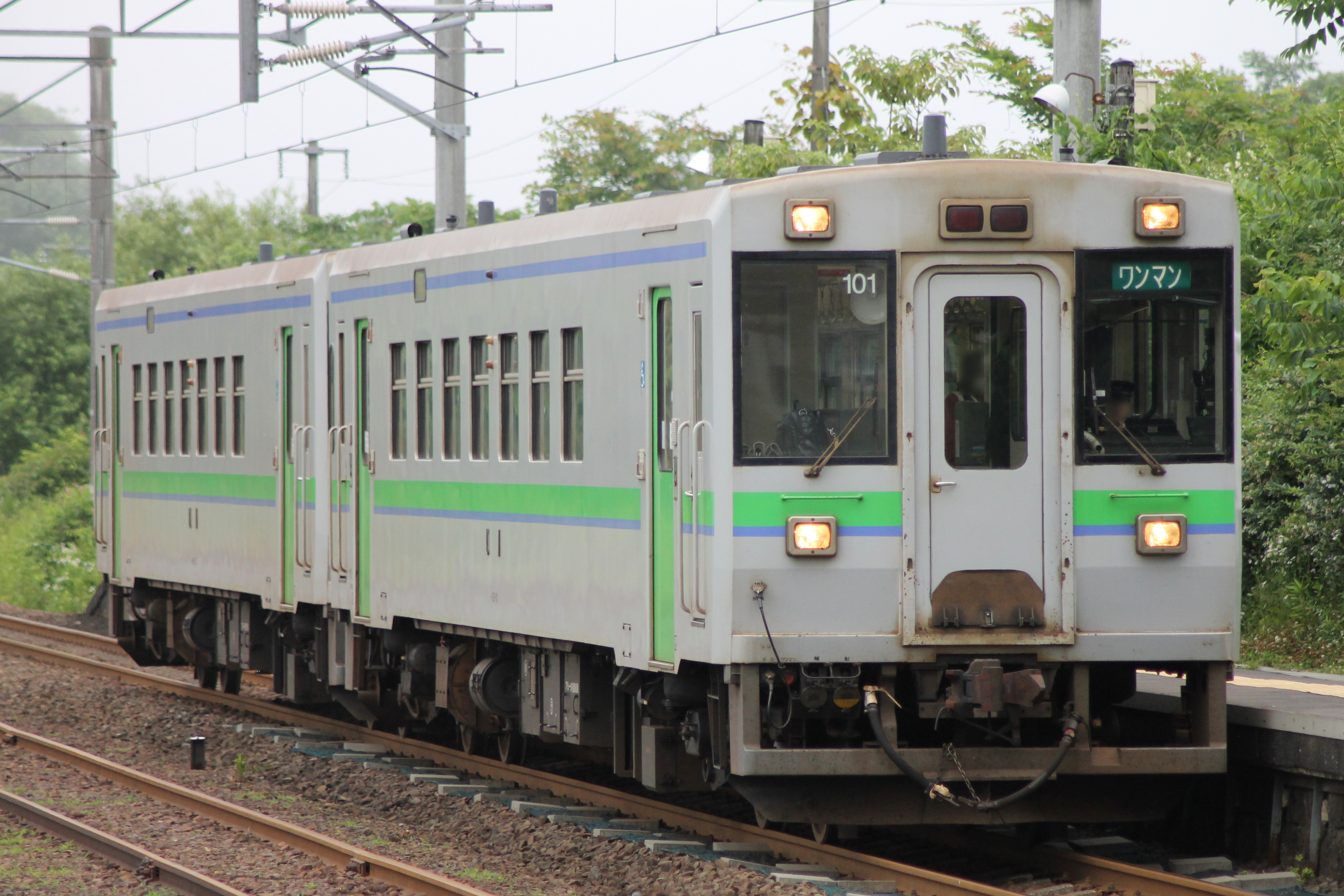
KiHa 143-101 leading a 3-car set in January 2010

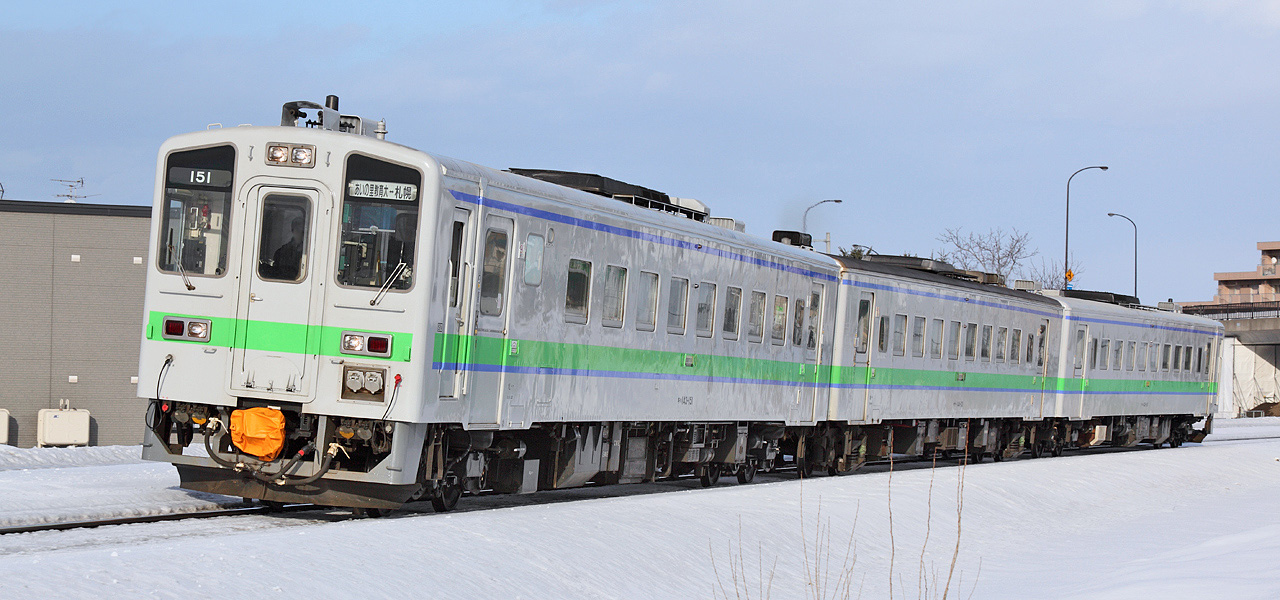
KiHa 143-151 as part of a 3-car set in January 2010

11 KiHa 143 cars were built in 1994 from surplus 50 series OHaFu 51 locomotive-hauled coaches to provide additional capacity on the Sassho Line. These cars are formed as two-car sets, consisting of KiHa 143-100 cars at the Sapporo end and KiHa 143-150 cars at the opposite end. The KiHa 143 cars are powered by two DMF13HZD 450 hp (340 kW) engines, and used bogies based on the KiHa 150 design. The KiHa 143-150 cars retain the original toilet of the 50 series coaches. All cars were fitted with air-conditioning from 1996.

Passenger accommodation consists of transverse seating bays arranged 2+1 abreast, with longitudinal bench seating at the car ends.

A number of KiHa 143 twin-car sets were modified for use on wanman driver-only operation services.

The KiHa 143 fleet was withdrawn from Muroran Main Line local services on 19 May 2023, ahead of their replacement by new 737 series AC electric multiple units.

On 16 November 2026, JR Hokkaido unveiled the Red Star, a tourist train converted from four former KiHa 143 series DMU cars. The train will run between Sapporo and Abashiri, and is planned to enter service in 2027.

=== Build details ===
The build dates and former identities are as shown below.

Car No.	Former number	Built	Location
KiHa 143-101	OHaFu 51-36	27 August 1994	Naebo Works
KiHa 143-102	OHaFu 51-41	1 September 1994	Naebo Works
KiHa 143-103	OHaFu 51-24	25 October 1994	Naebo Works
KiHa 143-104	OHaFu 51-34	31 January 1995	Naebo Works
KiHa 143-151	OHaFu 51-32	24 August 1994	Kushiro Depot
KiHa 143-152	OHaFu 51-15	28 August 1994	Goryokaku Depot
KiHa 143-153	OHaFu 51-35	28 October 1994	Kushiro Depot
KiHa 143-154	OHaFu 51-20	29 October 1994	Goryokaku Depot
KiHa 143-155	OHaFu 51-27	1 April 1995	Naebo Works
KiHa 143-156	OHaFu 51-39	21 July 1995	Goryokaku Depot
KiHa 143-157	OHaFu 51-60	4 August 1995	Goryokaku Depot

== KiSaHa 144 ==
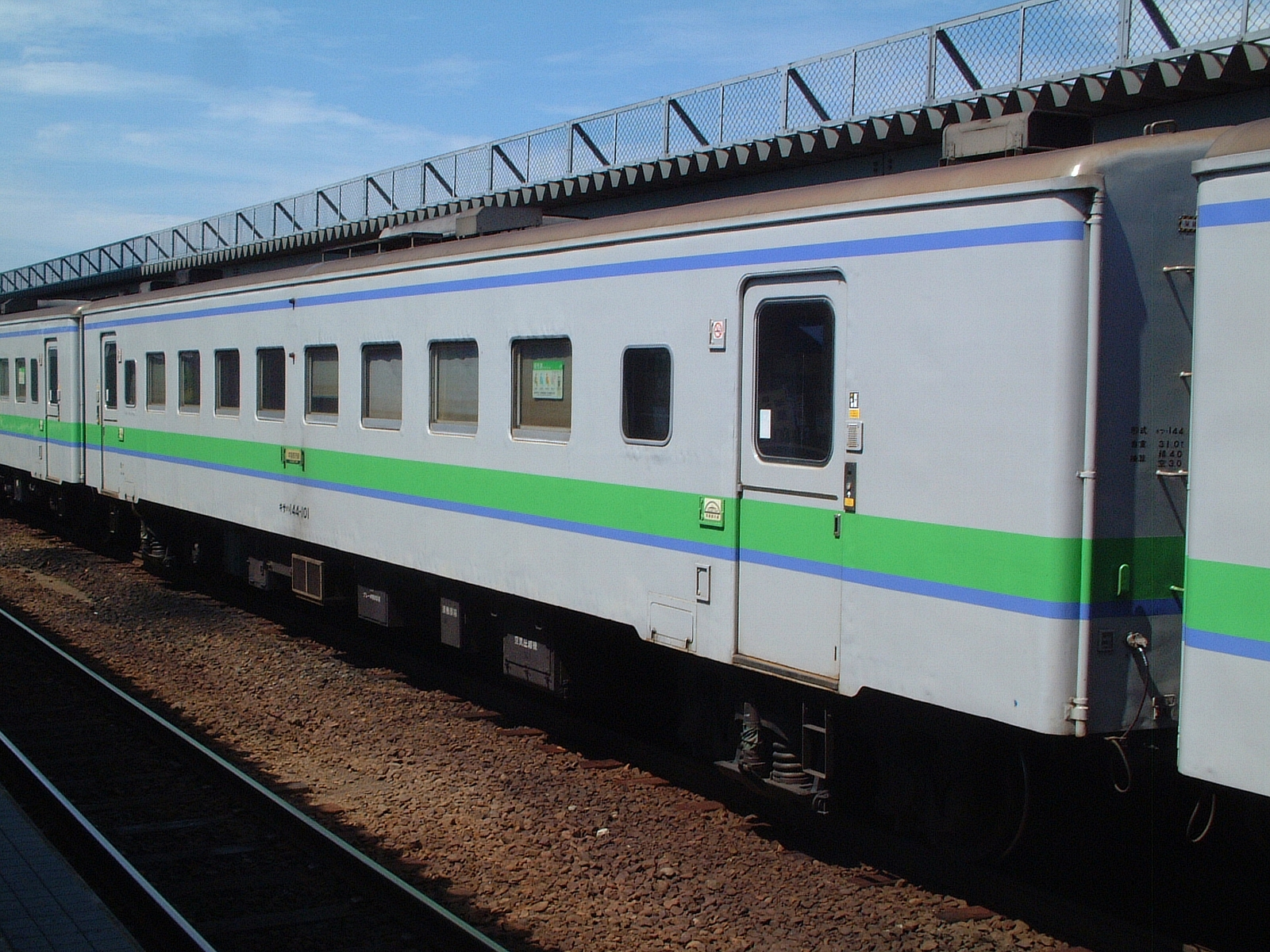
KiSaHa 144-101 on the Sassho Line in August 2007

Four KiSaHa 144 non-powered intermediate cars were built in 1994 from surplus 50 series OHaFu 51 locomotive-hauled coaches. Originally used sandwiched between KiHa 141 and KiHa 142 cars, they were later used between pairs of KiHa 143 cars. All cars were fitted with air-conditioning in 2001.

Passenger accommodation consists of transverse seating bays arranged 2+1 abreast, with longitudinal bench seating at the car ends.

=== Build details ===
The build dates and former identities are as shown below.

Car No.	Former number	Built	Location
KiSaHa 144-101	OHaFu 51-7	25 March 1994	Naebo Works
KiSaHa 144-102	OHaFu 51-9	24 March 1994	Naebo Works
KiSaHa 144-103	OHaFu 51-10	29 March 1994	Naebo Works
KiSaHa 144-104	OHaFu 51-33	31 March 1994	Naebo Works

KiSaHa 144-104 was initially numbered KiSaHa 144-151, but was renumbered KiSaHa 144-104 in August 1995 following removal of its toilet at Naebo Works.

== History ==
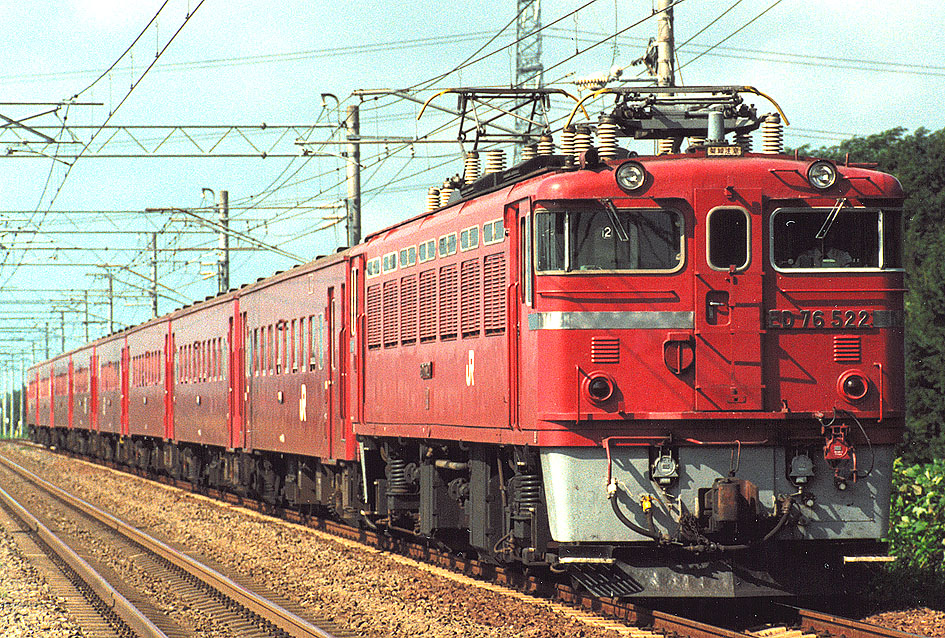
A train of JR Hokkaido 50 series coaches in 1990

A large number of locomotive-hauled 50 series coaches became surplus to requirements following electrification of lines in the Sapporo area of Hokkaido in the late 1980s. A program was therefore started to rebuild a number of these coaches into diesel multiple unit (DMU) trains to replace ageing DMUs on the non-electrified Sassho Line. In March 1990, one two-car set, formed of KiHa 141-1 and KiHa 142-1, was formed at Kushiro Depot and transferred to Naebo Depot from April of that year. Between 1990 and 1995, a total of 44 DMUs cars were built from former 50 series coaches at Kushiro Depot, Goryokaku Depot, and Naebo Works.

== Withdrawals and resale ==
The first two cars built, KiHa 141-1 and KiHa 142-1, were withdrawn in March 2005.

Four KiHa 141 series cars, KiHa 143-155, KiSaHa 144-103, KiSaHa 144-101, and KiHa 142-201, were sold to JR East and moved to Koriyama Works in November 2012 for conversion into the SL Ginga Joyful Train set for use with the restored JNR Class C58 steam locomotive C58 239 from April 2014.

A number of cars were sold to Myanmar National Railways.

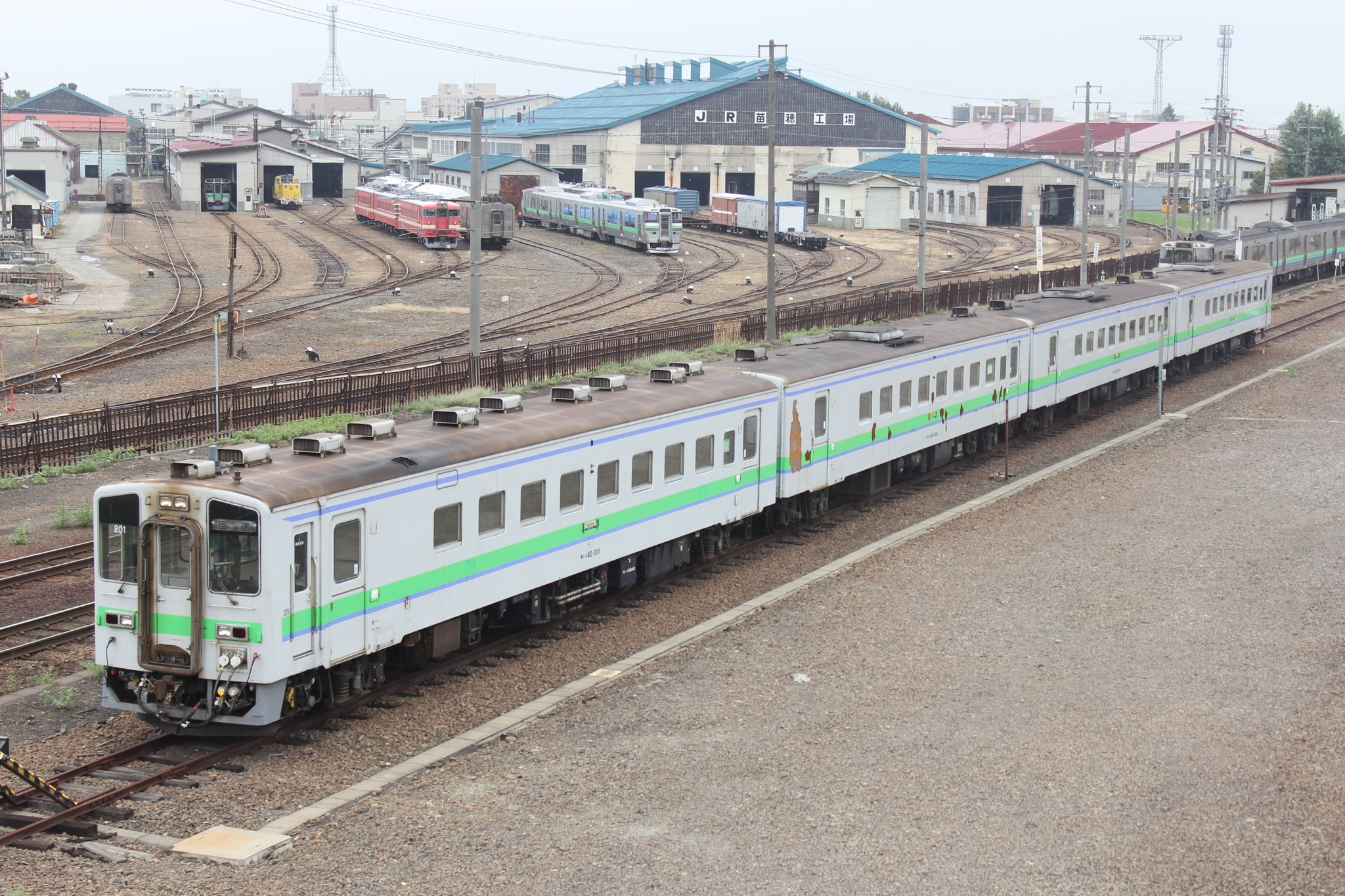
A lineup of withdrawn KiHa 141 series cars at Naebo Works in August 2012, including KiHa 142-201

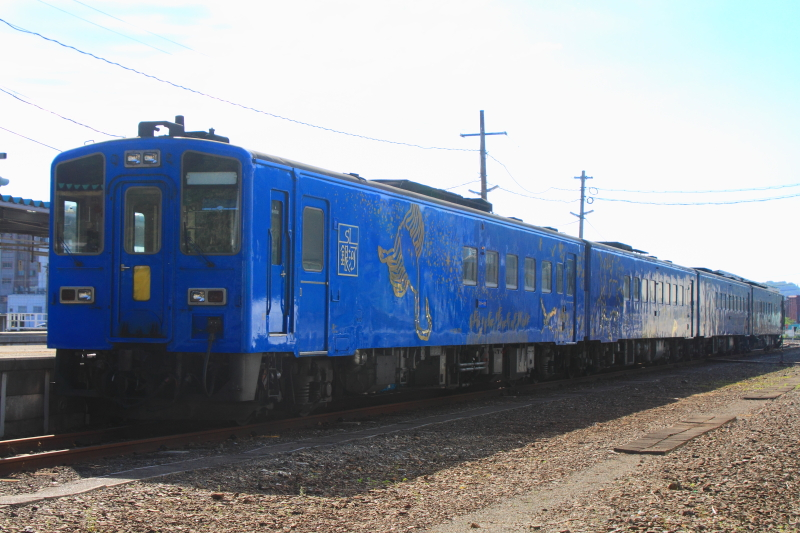
The SL Ginga trainset converted from four KiHa 141 series cars
