= List of music festivals in South Korea =

Music festivals of South Korea
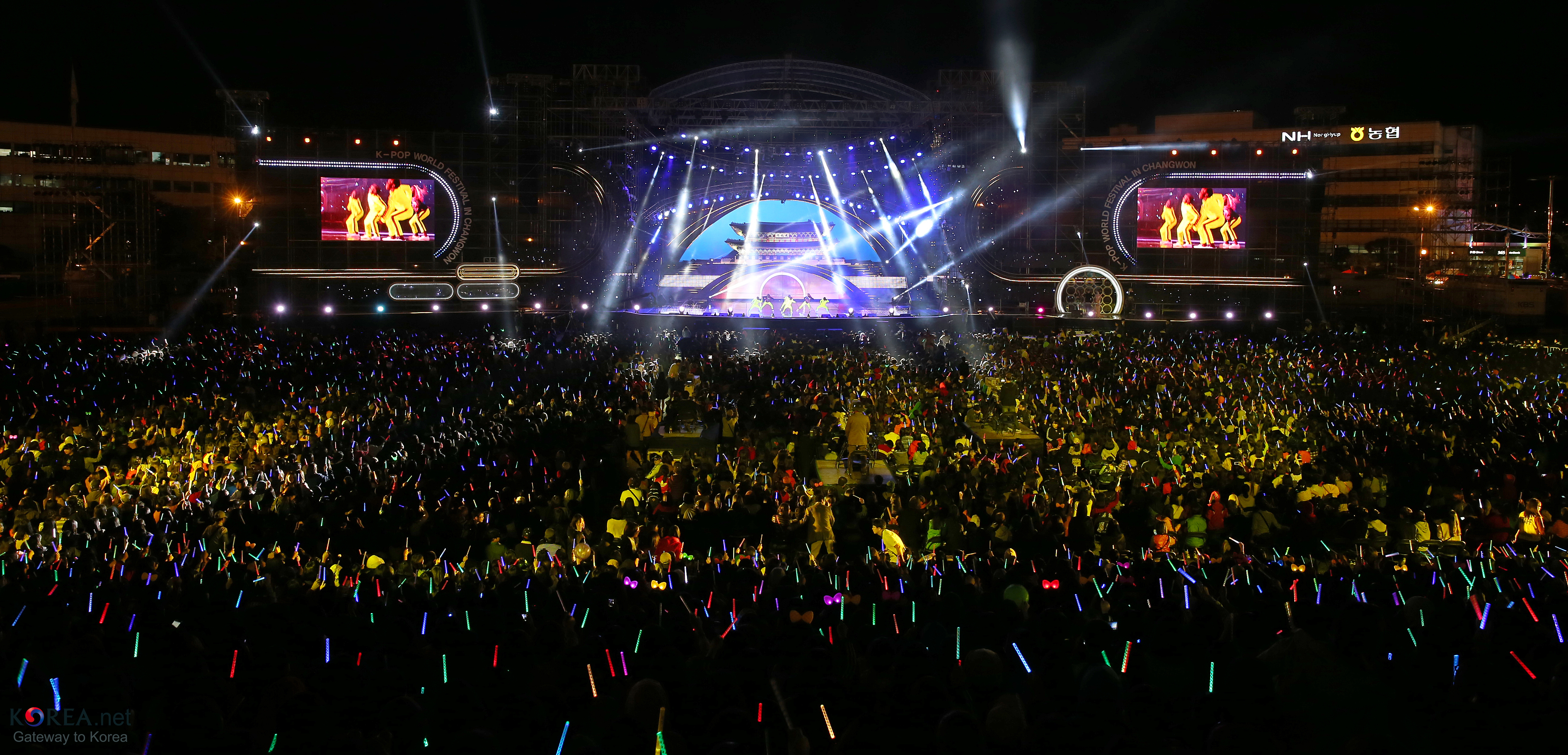
- October 2013 K-POP World Festival in Changwon

General Information
- Related genres: K-pop, rock music, classical music, etc.
- Location: South Korea (primarily Seoul)

The following is a list of music festivals in South Korea. This list may have overlap with list of music festivals and festivals of Korea. Music festivals in South Korea may focus on Korean musicians or international musicians, and may be either in a concert or music competition format, or both. South Korea has folk festivals incorporating Korean traditional music, which includes combinations of the folk, vocal, religious and Korean ritual music styles of the Korean people, practiced since prehistoric times. Music of South Korea in contemporary times incorporates diverse genres, and South Korea has many ongoing rock festivals dedicated to pop music, Korean rock, and K-pop.

== Festivals ==
| Festival name | Type | City/venue | Years | Notes |
|---|---|---|---|---|
| Asia Song Festival | Pop festival | South Korea | 2004–present | International Asian pop festival |
| Block Party Music and Art Festival | Rock festival | Haebangchon | 2022–present | Indie music and variety performances |
| Busan Rock Festival | Rock festival | Busan | 2000–present | Rock, metal, and indie |
| Daegu International Opera Festival | Opera festival | Daegu | 2003–present | Multiple features beyond main opera |
| Dongducheon Rock Festival | Rock festival | Dongducheon | 1999–present | Edgier rock |
| DMZ Peace Train Music Festival | Music festival | Cheorwon | 2018–present | Rock, world, folk |
| Dream Concert | Pop festival | Seoul | 1995–present | |
| ETPFEST | Rock festival | Seoul | 2001–present | Founded by Seo Taiji |
| Festival the Sub | Rock festival | Hongdae | 2022–present | |
| Great Mountains Music Festival & School | Classical music festival | PyeongChang | 2004–present | Chamber music festival |
| Incheon Korean Music Wave | Pop festival | Incheon | 2009–present | |
| Isang Yun Competition | Classical music festival | Tongyeong | 2003–present | |
| Jarasum International Jazz Festival | Jazz festival | Gapyeong-gun | 2004–present | |
| Jecheon International Music & Film Festival | Film festival | Jecheon | 2004–present | |
| Jeonju International Sori Festival | Folk festival | Jeonju | 2001–present | |
| Jeonju Ultimate Music Festival (JUMF) | Rock festival | Jeonju | 2016–present | |
| Jeju International Wind Ensemble Festival | Classical music festival | Jeju City | 1995–present | 200,000+ attend for wind ensembles |
| Jisan Valley Rock Festival | Rock festival | Ansan | 2009–present | |
| K-Pop World Festival | Pop festival | Changwon | 2011–present | Organized by Ministry of Foreign Affairs |
| Pentaport Rock Festival | Rock festival | Incheon | 2006–present | |
| Seoul Fringe Festival | Experimental music festival | Seoul | 1988–present | Indie culture focus, renamed in 2002 |
| Seoul Jazz Festival | Jazz festival | Seoul | 2007–present | |
| World DJ Festival | EDM festival | Seoul | 2007–present | |
| Ssamzi Sound Festival | Rock festival | Seoul | 1999–2014 | |
| Summer Breeze | Rock festival | Seoul | 2008 | Cancelled for low sales |
| Supersonic Festival | Pop festival | Seoul | 2012–present | |
| The Glow | Music festival | Goyang | 2024–present | Organized by Wanderloch Inc. |
| Tongyeong International Music Festival | Classical music festival | Tongyeong | 2002–present | Contest |
| Seoul International Music Festival | Classical music festival | Seoul | 2009–present | |
| Ultra Korea | EDM festival | Seoul | 2012–present | Spin-off of Ultra Miami |
| Zandari Festa | Music showcase/conference | Seoul | 2012–present | Multiple venues around Hongdae |

== Gallery ==
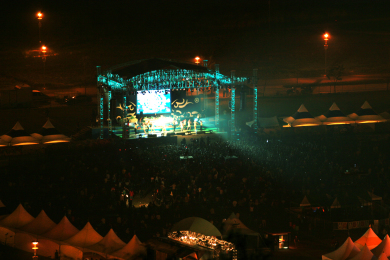
Seoul World DJ Festival

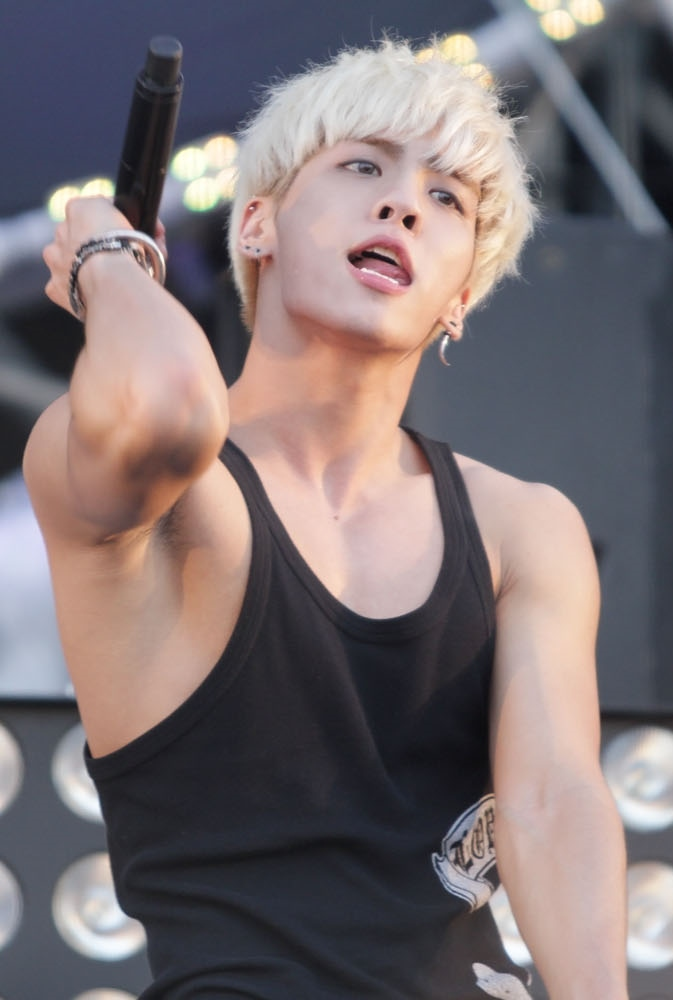
Jonghyun at the Ultra Music Festival 2013

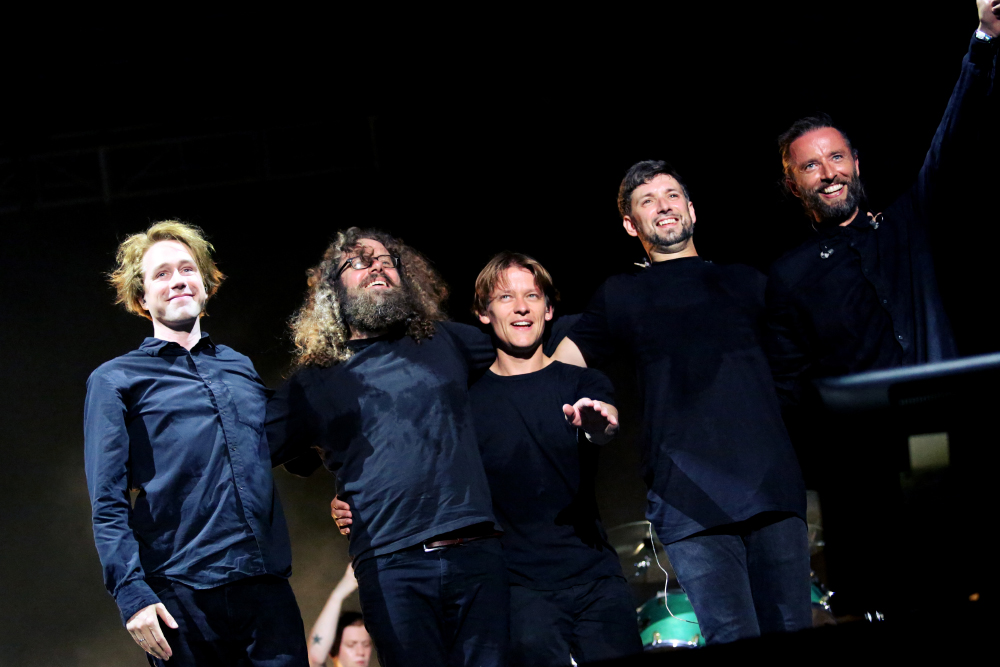
Pentaport Rock Festival 2015

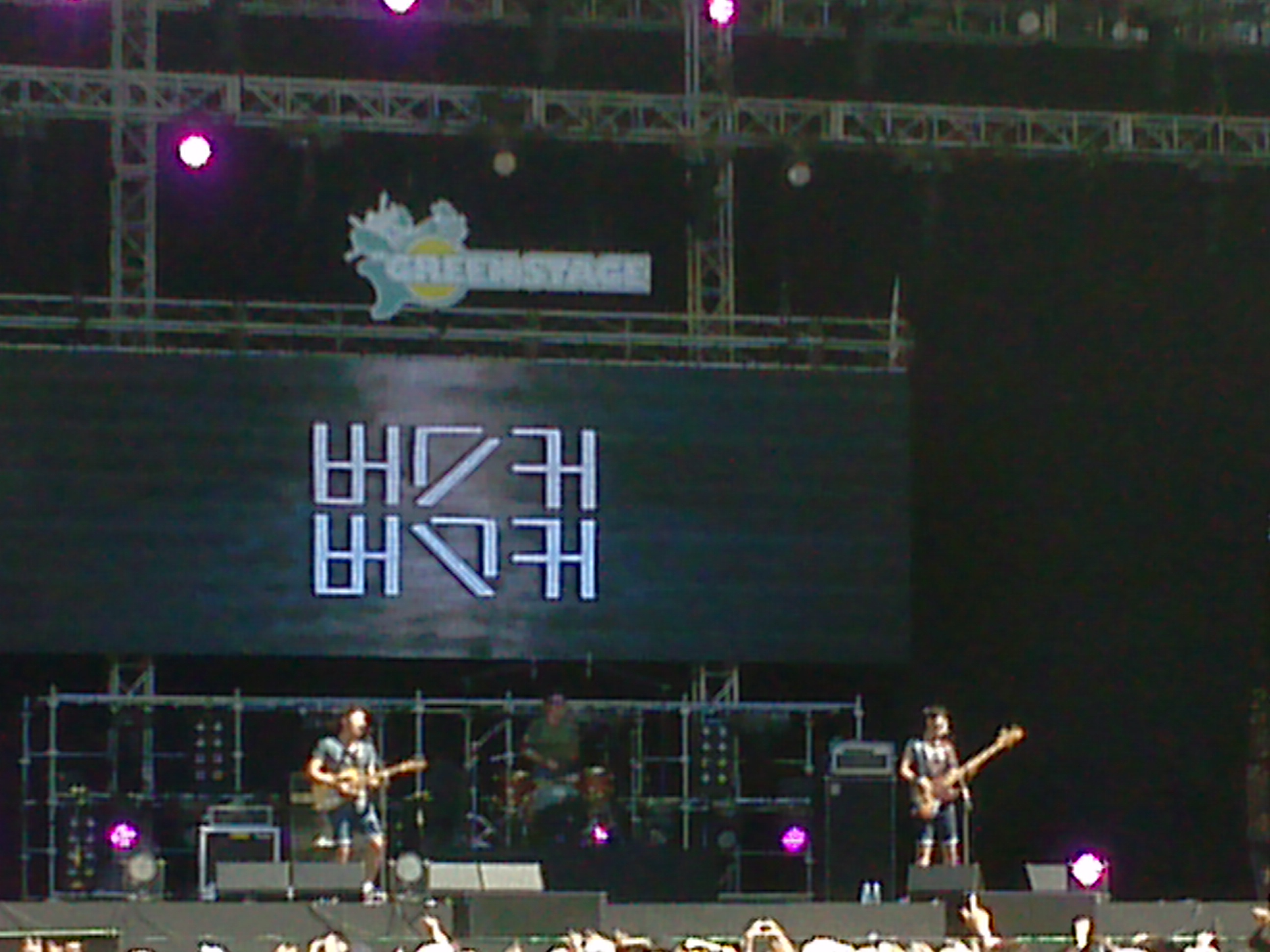
Jisan Valley Rock Festival 2012

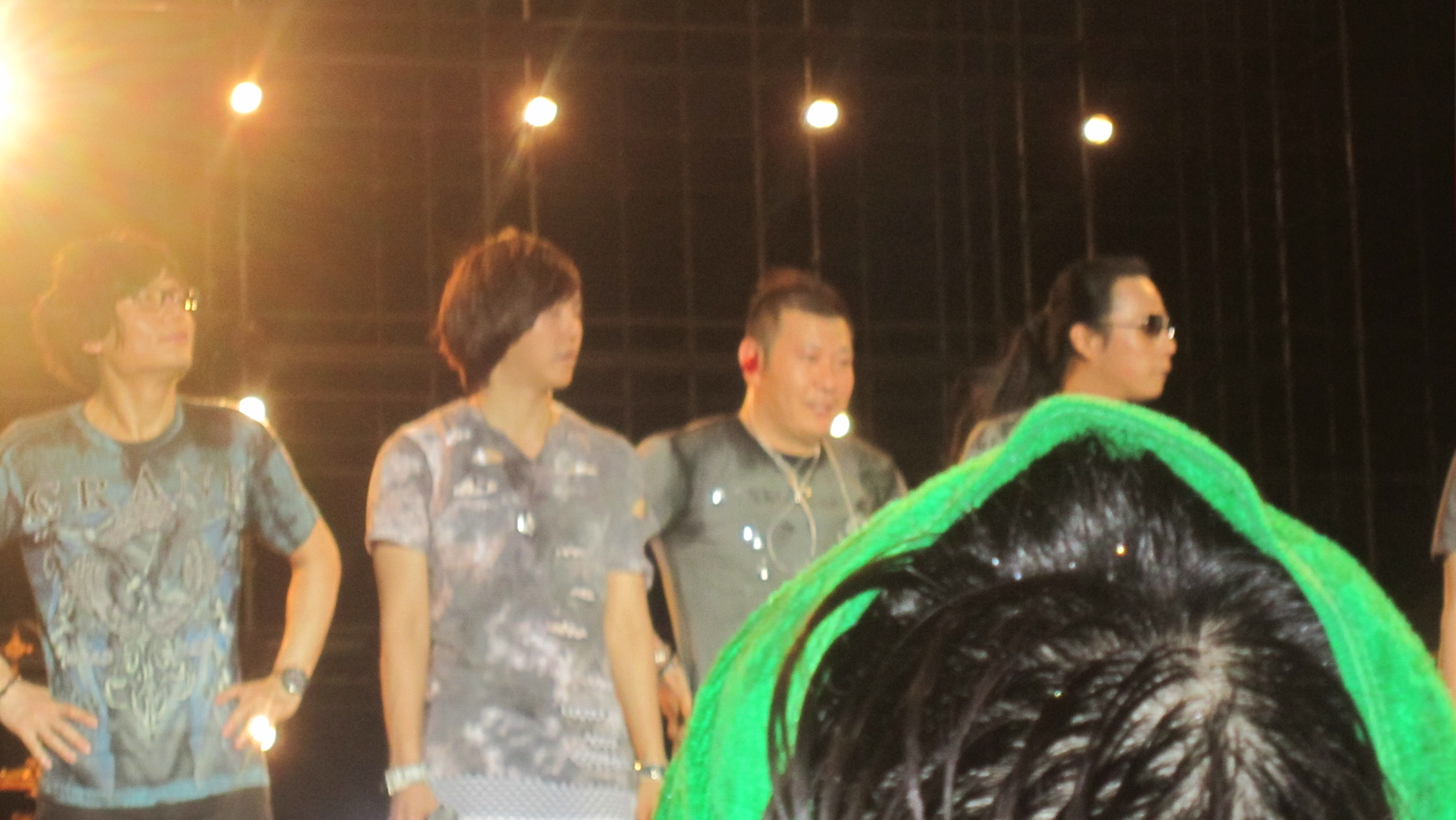
2011 Busan Rock Festival

== See also ==
- Festivals of Korea
- List of music festivals § South Korea
- Music of South Korea
- Korean rock § Korean rock festivals
- List of film festivals in South Korea
- List of South Korean tourist attractions
