= Seoul World DJ Festival =

Annual music festival in South Korea

World DJ Festival
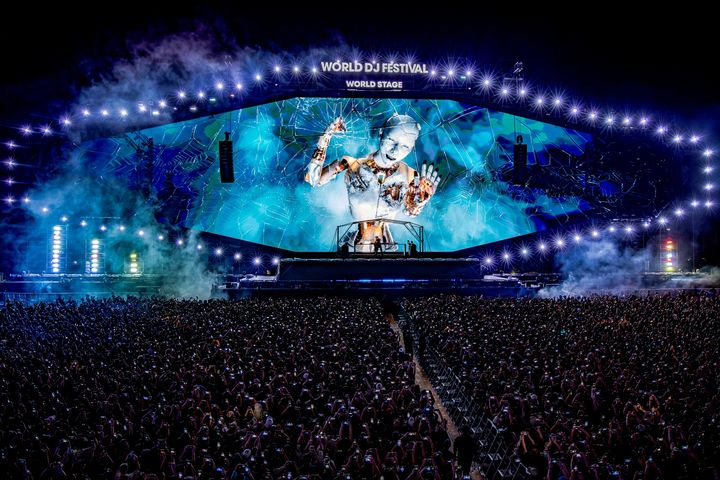
- Genre: Electronic Dance Music
- Dates: activate
- Locations: Nanji Hangang Park (2007–2010); Yangpyeong Festival Park (2011–2014); Chuncheon Songam Sports Town (2015–2016); Seoul Olympic Main Stadium (2017–2018); Seoul Land (2019, 2023–present); Paradise City (2020); Jangchung Arena (2021); Seoul Sports Complex Auxiliary Stadium (2023); Busan Cinema Center (2023); Boryeong Mud Festival (2023, 2025); Makuhari Messe International Exhibition Center Halls 9-11, Japan (2025)
- Countries: South Korea; Japan
- Years active: 2007–present
- Inaugurated: 2007-05-04
- Founders: BEPCTANGENT
- Previous event: 2025-06-14 ~ 15 (korea)
- Next event: 2025-06-28 ~ 29 (japan)
- Website: https://www.wdjfest.com/

World DJ Festival (WDF) is a music festival initiated as the main program of Hi-Seoul Festival in 2007 at the Nanji Campground on the Han River in Seoul, South Korea.The annual World DJ Festival has been the biggest DJ Festival in Korea.

== 2007 ==
The first festival appeared on May 3–5, 2007, and was a part of the Hi Seoul Festival, a seasonal events program coordinated by the city tourism agency. Due to the positive feedback from the event, especially from young foreign expatriate residents in the dj scene, Idea Masters, an events promoter returned the following year with a much larger, paid admission event located at the current site.

The event was recognized as becoming one of the largest festivals in Korea, as it has attracted more than 90,000 people over three days in 2007. It featured a live concert, a dance party, and a world rhythm festival.

== 2008 ==
The DJ festival showcased numerous DJs from around the world, and in a break from other festivals or events in the Seoul area, encouraged people to dance all night and into the morning. Artists, performers and fans of all tastes and genres including electronica, rock & roll, international, attended and showed their enthusiasm.

Unlike the first event in 2007, the following year became independently operated and required paid admission. As far as international flavor in Seoul, the DJ festival is noticeably more mixed as a combination of locals, visiting foreigners, expatriates, pros and amateurs, and guest DJs from overseas.

This festival lasted from May 3–5, 2008. In 2008, the SWDF returned to establish itself as the only DJ festival in Korea.

== 2009 ==
The 2009 SWDF started on May 9.

== Foreign DJs ==
Tech'1 (Singapore), Cornelius (JPN), DJ Dan (USA), Donald Glaude (USA), Ricky Stone (UK), Rabbit in the Moon (USA), Adam F (UK), Raphael Sebbag (FRA), Kawasaki (JPN), Superheadz (JPN), Kai (USA), Scott Pullen (AUS), C-Deuce&Loco, Brainshocker (ITA)

== Korean DJs ==
DJ KOO, JAEIN, DJ BEEJAY, Oriental Funk Stew, Guru, Fugi, Ditto, Kidb, Kuma, Ultradog, Triple house, Sung woo, Yoo

== See also ==
- List of music festivals in South Korea
- List of electronic music festivals
