= 737 series (JR Hokkaido) =

Japanese electric multiple unit train type

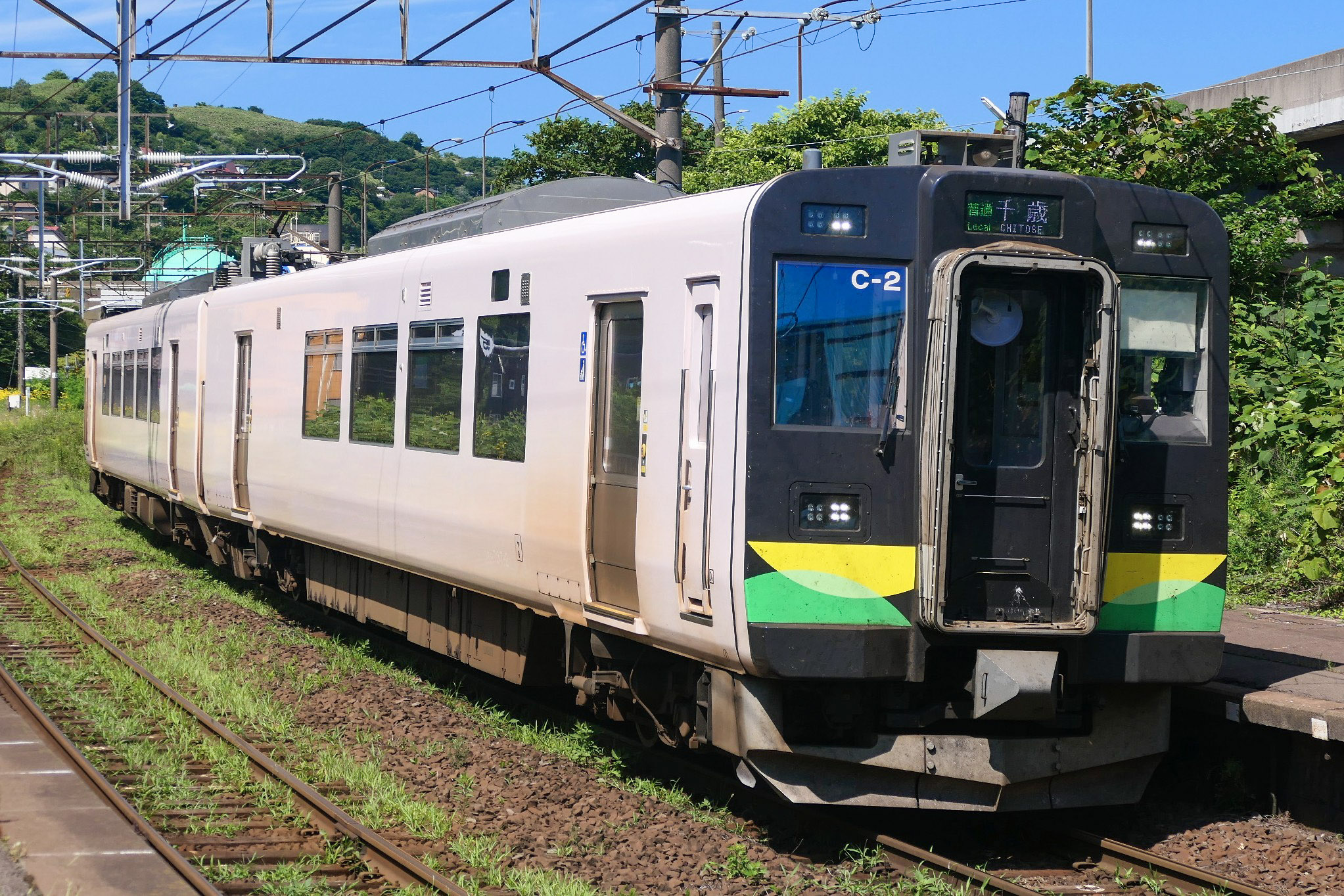
- 737 series, August 2025
- In service: 20 May 2023 – present
- Manufacturer: Hitachi
- Built at: Kasado
- Replaced: KiHa 143, 721 series
- Constructed: 2022–2023
- Number built: 26 vehicles (13 sets)
- Formation: 2 cars per trainset
- Fleet numbers: C-1 – C-13
- Capacity: 269 (93 seated) per trainset
- Operator: JR Hokkaido
- Depot: Sapporo
- Lines served: Muroran Main Line, Hakodate Main Line

Specifications
- Car body construction: Aluminium
- Maximum speed: 120 km/h (75 mph)
- Multiple working: Within type (up to 3 sets)

The 737 series (737系) is an AC electric multiple unit (EMU) commuter train type operated by Hokkaido Railway Company (JR Hokkaido) on services in the Sapporo area of Hokkaido, Japan, since 20 May 2023. The type replaced the fleet of KiHa 143 diesel railcars operated on the Muroran Main Line. The trainsets mark the return of local EMU services on the Muroran Main Line since the retirement of the 711 series from these services in October 2012.

The 737 series is the first commuter train type operated by JR Hokkaido to support driver-only operation.

== Development and design ==
The 737 series is the first aluminium-bodied production rolling stock operated by JR Hokkaido (the front ends are made of steel). Its adoption follows the development of the experimental 735 series (introduced in 2012), which was developed to test the suitability of aluminium bodywork in cold-weather conditions. The weight savings brought on by aluminium were also taken into consideration, as the equipment required to support driver-only operation would otherwise lead to a significant increase in weight.

The sets are painted in a light pink livery inspired by cherry blossoms; the front end is painted black, with green and yellow accents.

Internally, the sets use longitudinal seating throughout. The seats are covered in purple moquette with a dotted design, which JR Hokkaido states was inspired by the blooming flowers in the Hokkaido region. Car 2 features a toilet. The floor height is 19 centimetres (7.5 in) lower than that of the outgoing KiHa 143 railcars.

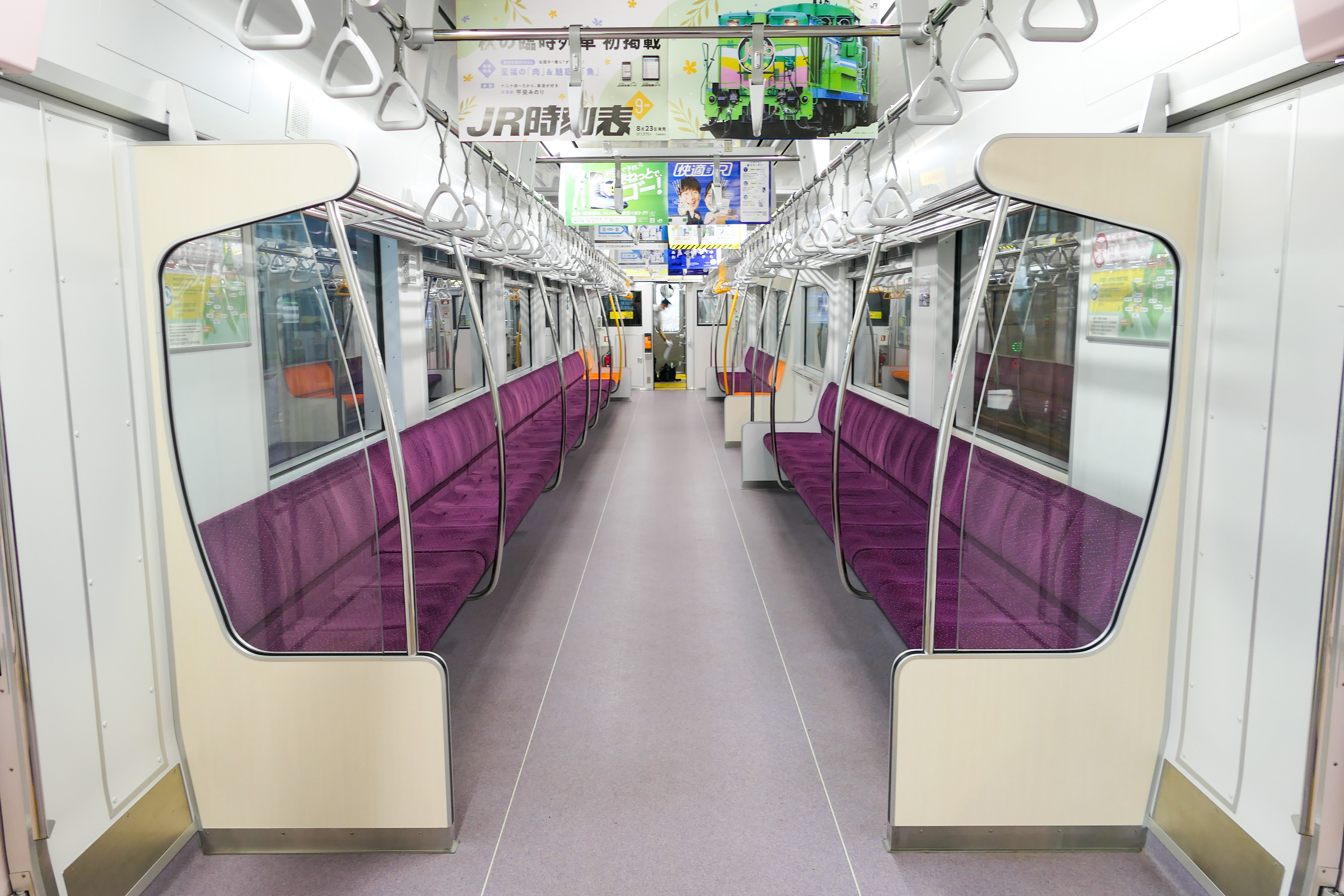
Interior

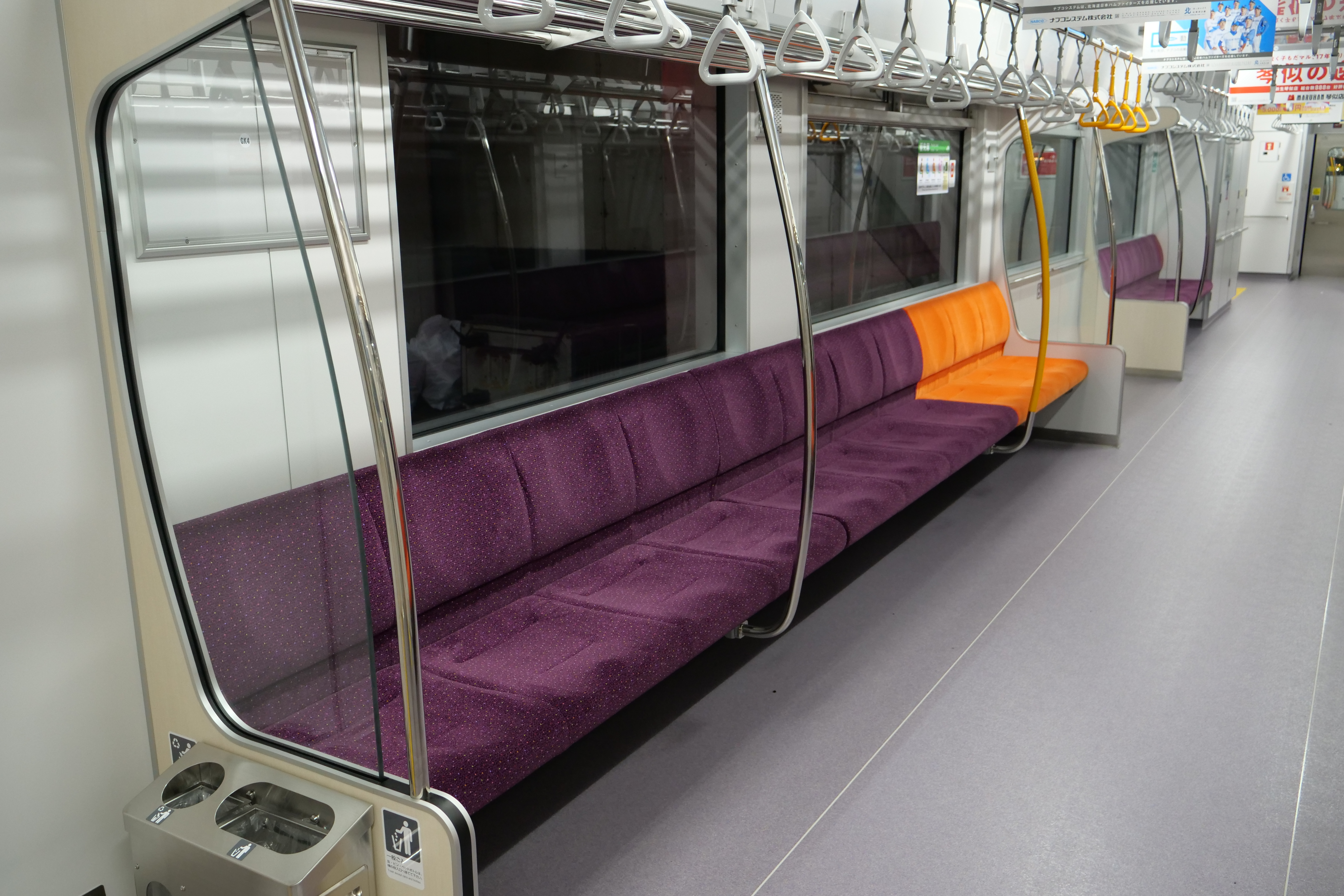
Partial-width longitudinal seat with priority seating at the end (orange)

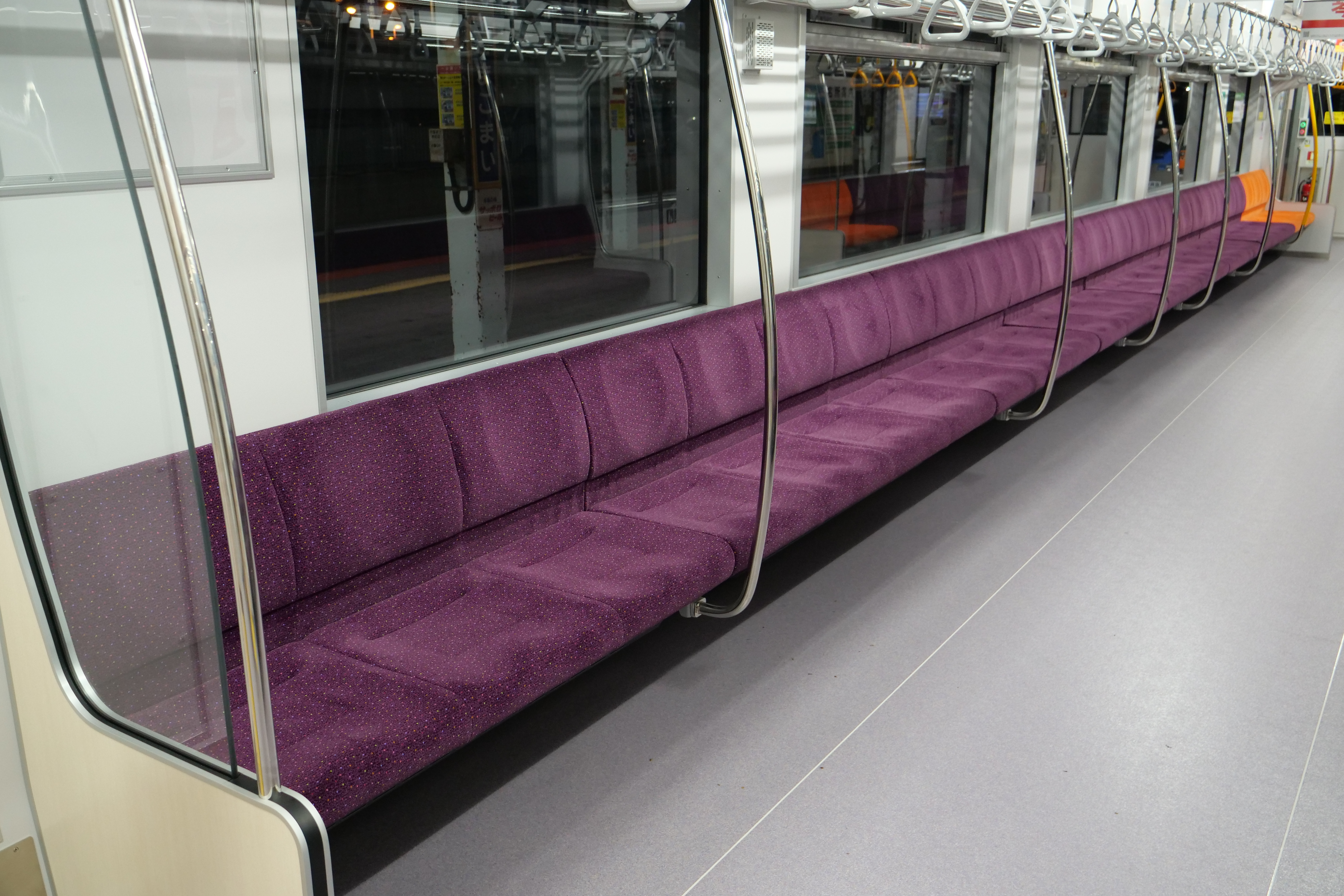
Full-width longitudinal seat

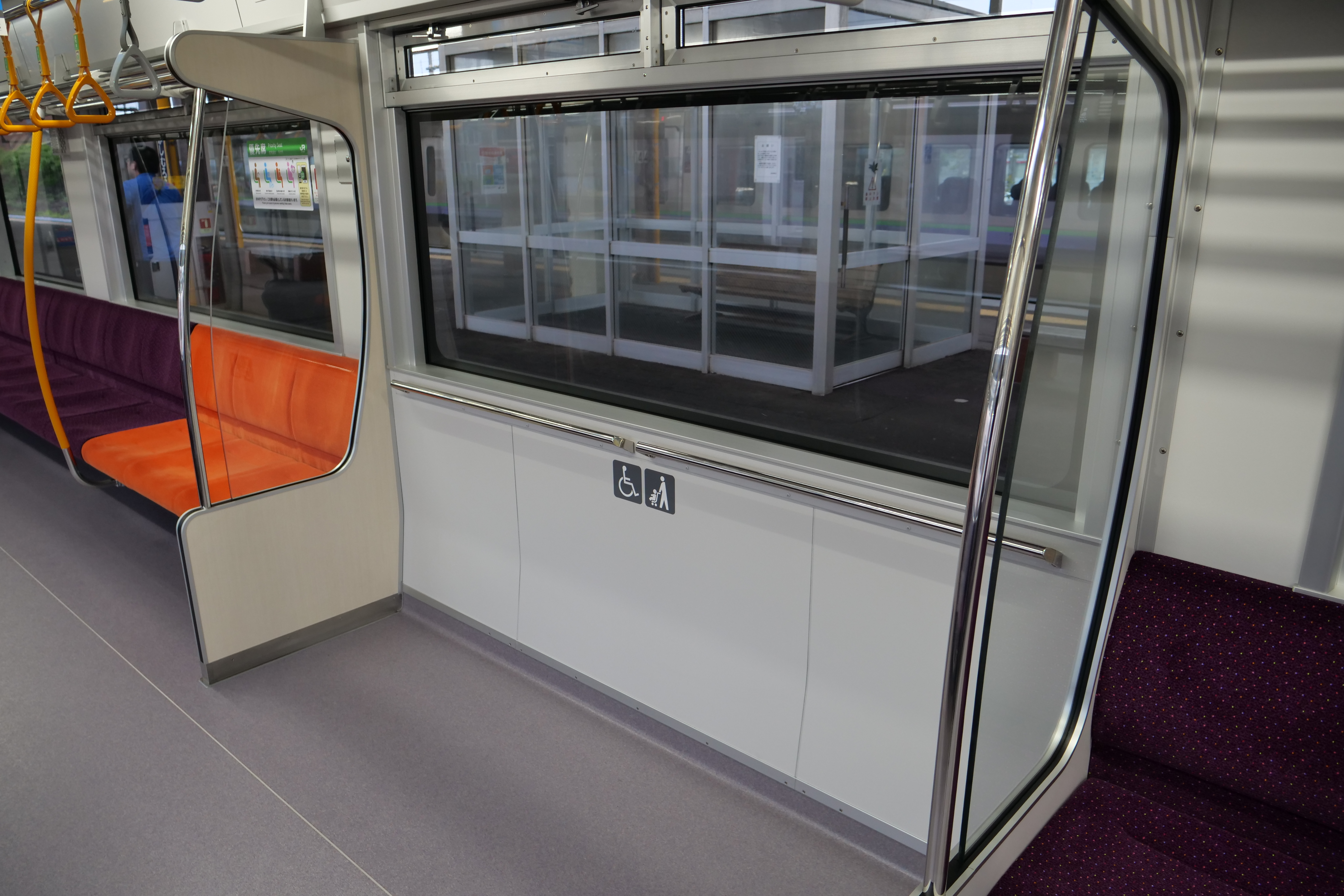
Free space

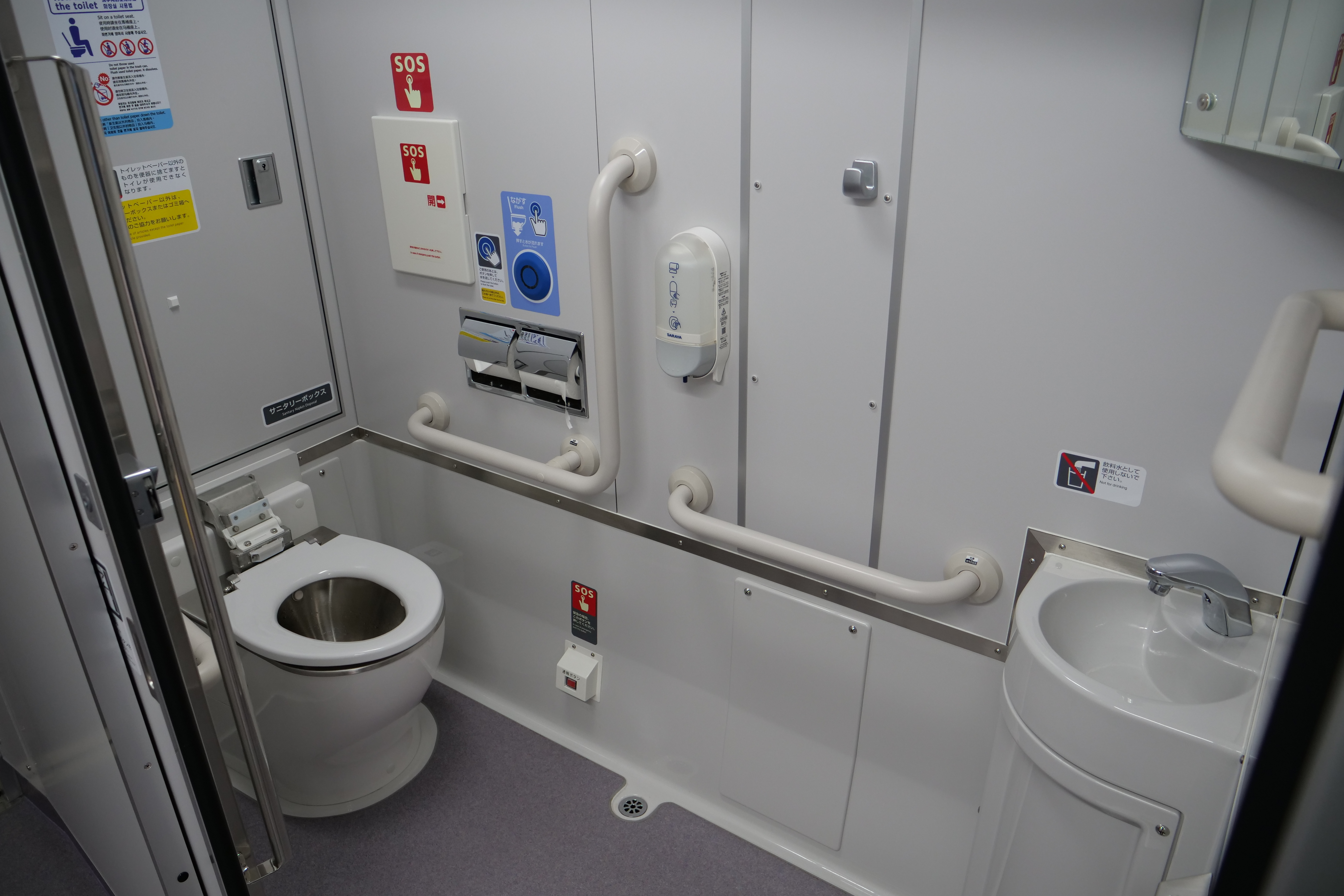
Toilet

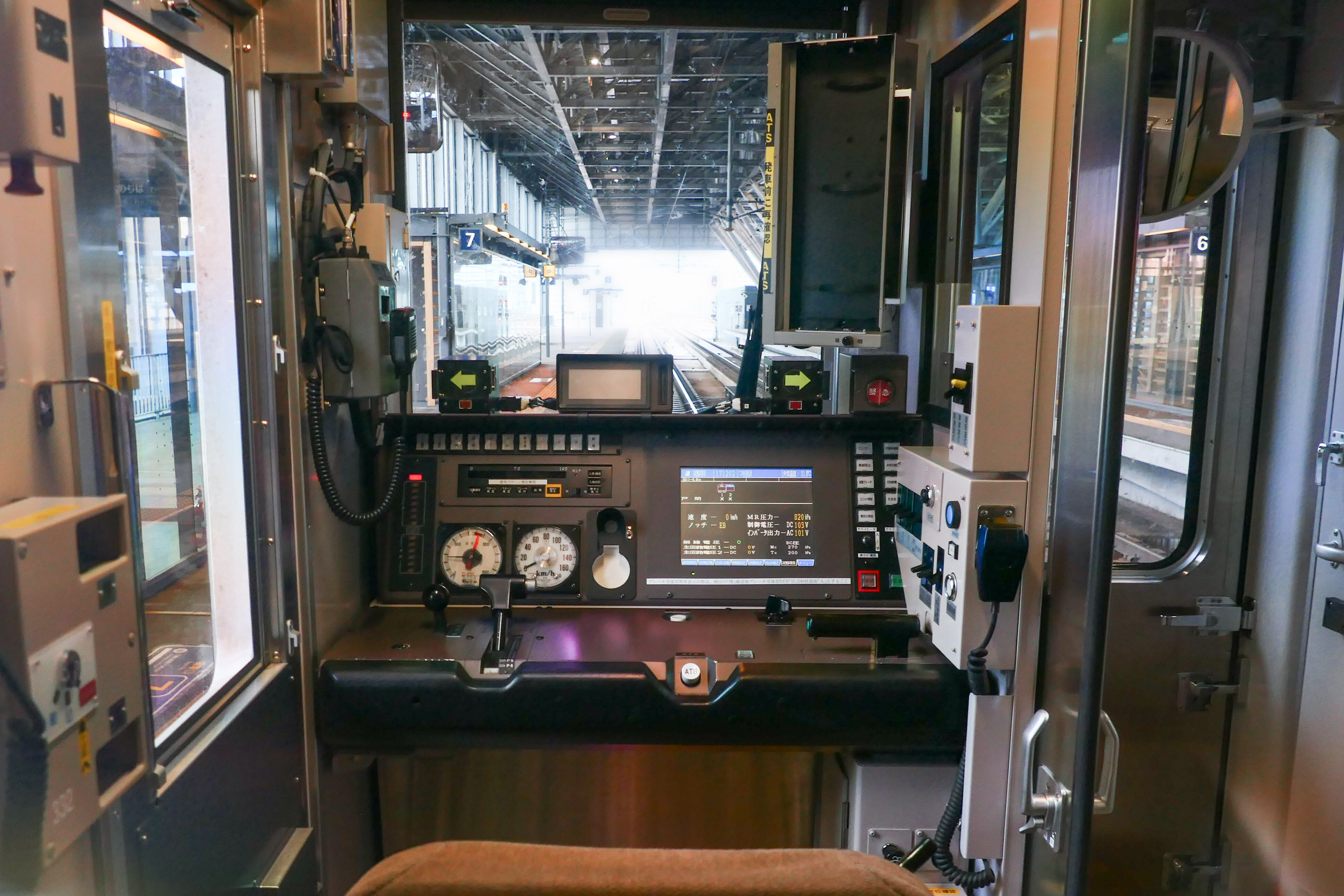
Driver's cab

== Operations ==
The 737 series sets operate between Tomakomai and Muroran stations on the Muroran Main Line, replacing the fleet of KiHa 143 diesel railcars and displacing some H100 series diesel-electric railcars, the latter of which had also been planned to replace all local trains on the Furano Line.

The 737 series also entered service on the Hakodate Main Line (Iwamizawa – Asahikawa) from 16 March 2024, with this series alongside H100 series DEMUs replacing older 721 series EMUs and other diesel cars previously operated in this section.

All sets are based at Sapporo depot.

== History ==
The first two sets, C-1 and C-2, were delivered in November 2022. The sets were manufactured by Hitachi at its Kasado facility. Training took place in January and February 2023. By April 2023, seven sets had been built. The final six sets, C-8 to C-13, were delivered in May 2023.

The 737 series entered revenue service from 20 May 2023.

== Configuration ==
All trainsets will be made of 2-car sets with a maximum speed of 120 km/h (75 mph).

The capacity is listed at 269 passengers per trainset, of which 93 are seated.
