= Eun-ha =

- Hangul: 은하
- RR: Eunha
- MR: Ŭnha
- IPA: [ɯnha]

Eun-ha, also spelled Un-ha, is a Korean given name.

People with this name include:

- Shim Eun-ha (born 1972), South Korean actress
- Kim Eun-ha (born 1975), South Korean tennis player
- Jeon Eun-ha (born 1993), South Korean football player
- Eunha (singer) (born Jung Eun-bi, 1997), South Korean singer, member of girl group Viviz

Fictional characters with this name include:

- Cho Eun-ha, in 2003 South Korean television series Love Letter
- Eun-ha, in 2005 South Korean film You Are My Sunshine
- Seo Eun-ha, in 2005 South Korean television series Resurrection
- Baek Eun-ha, in 2020 South Korean television series Flower Of Evil

== See also ==
- List of Korean given names
- Unha (disambiguation)
