= Summer Breeze (rock festival) =

Cancelled rock festival in Seoul, South Korea

- Genre: Rock, alternative, punk, indie, electronic, world
- Dates: 2008. 08. 07 & 08 (cancelled)
- Locations: Seoul, South Korea
- Years active: N/A
- Website: summerbreeze.co.kr

Summer Breeze was a rock festival, originally planned to be held annually in Seoul, South Korea for two days of early August. The inaugural festival was scheduled to take place at Seoul Olympic Stadium in Jamshil, South Korea in 2008. The festival was modeled after other urban music festivals such as Summersonic Festival of Japan, Lolapalooza of the United States, and Rock Am Ring of Germany. Summer Breeze covered various genres of music, but mainly focused on rock music. Summer Breeze Festival 2008 was cancelled due to low ticket sales.

== 2008 line-up (cancelled) ==
Thursday, August 7	Friday, August 8
The Prodigy; OneRepublic; Panic! at the Disco; Lostprophets; New Found Glory; Dr. Core 911; Vassline	Simple Plan; Rize; Jamie Scott & The Town; Stacie Orrico; Rainy Sun

== See also ==
- List of music festivals in South Korea
