= Summer Breeze Festival (California) =

R&B festival in Long Beach, California, USA

- Genre: R&B
- Dates: Summer
- Locations: Long Beach, California, United States
- Years active: 2015–2017
- Website: https://summer-breeze-festival.com

Summer Breeze Festival is an American R&B festival. It took place annually in Long Beach, California, United States from 2015 to 2017. The festival drew around 6,000 attendees annually.

The 1st Summer Breeze Festival was held on August 15, 2015. Acts included Keith Sweat, Jon B, Color Me Badd and Al B. Sure.

The 2nd Summer Breeze Festival was held on August 27, 2016. Acts included Keith Sweat, Tony! Toni! Tone!, Avant and Soul for Real.
