= Unha (disambiguation) =

Unha (Korean: 은하; lit. 'Galaxy') is a North Korean space launch rocket.

Unha, or Uh-Ha or variation, may also refer to:

== People ==
- Ri Unha, a member of the Military-First Girls

== Places ==
- Unha (Naut Aran), Lleida, Catalonia, Spain; a municipal entity
- Unha Line, Manp'o, Chagang, North Korea; an electrified rail line
- Unha station (운하역), Manp'o, Chagang, North Korea; a train station
- Mirae Unha Tower or Unha Tower (Galaxy Tower), Mirae Street, Pyongyang, North Korea; a 53-storey building
- Unha Village (운하리), Unjon County, North P'yŏngan, North Korea

== Other uses ==
- Eun-ha (은하), a Korean given name also romanized as "Un-ha"
- Korea Unha General Trading, a North Korean company

== See also ==
- The dictionary definition of 은하 at Wiktionary
- Hasanuddin University (UnHas), Makassar, South Sulawesi, Indonesia
- United Nations Humanitarian Air Service (UNHAS), an airline operated by the UN
