= Qunxing Paper =

Chinese paper company

Qunxing Paper 群星纸业
- Company type: Privately held company
- Industry: Paper manufacturing
- Founded: 1999
- Headquarters: Zouping, Shandong, China
- Area served: China
- Key people: Chairman: Mr. Zhu Yuguo
- Products: Decorative base paper
- Website: Qunxing Paper Holdings Limited

Qunxing Paper Holdings Limited (SEHK: 3868) is the largest decorative base paper manufacturer in the People's Republic of China, specializing in decorative base paper products and printing paper product. Its production base is located in Zouping County, Shandong Province. It serves 13 provinces, autonomous regions and municipalities in the PRC.

Qunxing Paper was listed on the Hong Kong Stock Exchange on 2 October 2007. Trading of its shares was suspended on 30 March 2011 and its shares were cancelled on 30 November 2017. In 2018, following an investigstion by the Securities and Futures Commission, a Hong Kong court ruled that Qunxing Paper, its chairman and vice-chairman, and one of its subsidiaries had misled investors in its 2007 IPO and subsequent financial statements.
