= Milky Way (disambiguation) =

The Milky Way is the galaxy that contains the Solar System.

Milky Way may also refer to:

== Places ==
- Milky Way (Antarctica), a col in Antarctica
- Via Lattea ("Milky Way"), a winter sports area in the Italian and French Alps

== Arts, entertainment, and media ==
=== Films ===
- The Milky Way, a 1922 silent film directed by W. S. Van Dyke
- The Milky Way (1936 film), a Harold Lloyd film
- The Milky Way (1940 film), an MGM cartoon
- The Milky Way (1969 film), a film directed by Luis Buñuel
- Milky Way (2000 film) (Mliječni put), a Bosnian film
- Milky Way (2007 film) (Tejút), a Hungarian film
- The Milky Way, (A via láctea), a 2007 film by Lina Chamie (Brazil), featured at the 2007 Cannes Film Festival
- The Milky Way (2023 film), an Israeli-French dystopian black comedy film

=== Music ===
- MilkyWay, a Japanese girl group created as a tie-in to the anime Kirarin Revolution
- "Milky Way" (Syd Barrett song)
- "Milky Way" (BoA song)
- Milky Way (album), an album by Bas
- "Milky Way", a song by Loudness from Disillusion
- "Milky Way", a jazz track by Marcus Miller from Free
- "Milky Way", a 1975 song by Sheer Elegance
- "Milky Way", a song by VIXX from VIXX 2016 Conception Ker
- Milkie Way, a member of the British electronic rock duo Wargasm
- Wintergatan ("Milky Way"), a Swedish band
- "Milky Way", a song by Neil Young and Crazy Horse from Colorado

=== Other arts, entertainment, and media ===
- Milky Way, a 1999 television commercial by Volkswagen featuring the song "Pink Moon"
- Milkyway Image, a Hong Kong feature film production company
- The Milky Way (novel), the UK publication of Jean Dutourd's novel The Best Butter

== Brands and enterprises ==
- Milky Way (chocolate bar), a brand of chocolate bar
- Milky Way (spread), a brand of chocolate spread
- Melkweg (Dutch for "Milky Way"), a music venue and cultural center in Amsterdam
- The Milky Way (amusement park), an amusement park in Clovelly, Devon, England

== Other uses ==
- Milky Way (mythology), myths and legends about the origin of the Milky Way
- MilkyWay@home, a distributed computing astronomy project
