= Unruly Qiao =

2011 Chinese television series

Unruly Qiao (Chinese: 刁蛮俏御医; pinyin: Diāomán qiào yù yī), also known as Royal Johnson Physician, Unruly Qiao Physician, or My Bratty Princess Spinoff, is a 2011 Chinese television series starring Jang Na-ra, Tae, and Gao Hao. It is produced by Shanghai New Culture Investment Group Co. Ltd., and was shot from September 8 to November 19, 2010 in Hengdian World Studios in Zhejiang.

== Story ==
A daughter of an accused deceased famous physician, was given to the care to a female imperial chef who is a sworn sibling before her whole family (except the baby) was executed; He Meiniang who raised the child by becoming a butcher selling pork in the market. The child's name was He Tian, disguised as a man to get into the Imperial Hospital to be a physician to cure illnesses and finding a book called 'Collected Essentials of species of Materia Medica', but failed the test. Her amazing acupuncture medical skills came from one of her father's book. But the Prime Minister daughter, Zhao Xiang Ning, didn't know the fact she's a girl and had fallen for her for the incident she caused with a child, Xiao Shi Tou. He Tian, the emperor and a bandit, fake eunuch became sworn brothers. He Tian became in-charge of the Imperial Hospital of the inner palace for curing maids, eunuch, etc. Her actions in finding the medical book created 20 years ago by her father and many others were known to Li Bao Chuan, the dowager eunuch. He knew she is a girl and suggested He Tian to marry Xiang Ning as once The Emperor asked her to check Xiang Ning's body for a hidden book recording lists of ministers committing greed, he tried to harm her looking for that book. He Tian tried to escape from the wedding but they threatened to kill her foster mother if she did not attend the upcoming wedding. He Tian told Xiang Ning she cannot marry a girl. The emperor, Dowager, Prime Minister, Li Bao Chuan and other subjects were at the scene of the wedding ceremony, when coming up to the bow husband and wife had to bow, He Tian removed her groom hat and revealed that she is a girl. Zhang Zhe San (her 2nd sworn brother), Xiang Ning, He Meiniang and the emperor (her sworn eldest brother) plead the Dowager from putting a dead sentence on her for lying to the emperor she is a girl and for losing The Dowager's face because of the wedding. The Dowager decided He Tian be executed the next day at noon, she was rescued by Zhang Zhe San for pretending attempting to kill The Emperor.

A new character named Lady Mo appeared. She and He Tian became sisters. She's in-charge of teaching maids how to serve properly and she'd fallen for the Emperor. She caused the death of Princess, He Tian's disciple etc. The Emperor liked her because her face was quite similar to He Tian's. Even though she knew The Emperor only loves He Tian, she worked with Li Bao Chuan and planned to drug He Tian with a special drug that makes one hallucinate, wanting to prove to every one she is a drug addict. The plan almost worked out, only to have He Tian rescued by Zhang Zhe San and Xiang Ning. After the wedding incident and knowing Zhang Zhe San is a fake eunuch, she wanted him to love her by trying out different methods. When He Tian found the medical book, the sworn siblings realized that there's nothing wrong with the series of medical books and the Prime Minister and Li Bao Chuan framed 12 physicians, their families and even servants to be executed that year. Xiao Shi Tou hid Zhang Zhe San, enemies are after him for having the remaining chapters of the series, to trade the fake copies with Xiao Shi Tou's life. But Xiao Shi Tou was shot by arrows as he assumed the chapters are real and went for them and died. He Tian learned about her origin, went to plead The Emperor for investigating her father's cause of death, for that she had to undergo kneeling towards The Emperor on peddles while screaming out her grief. Actually there are 100 over physicians doing the chapters but why only 12 died. The last chapters one of the pages marked and the code is 'Do you believe the Late Emperor died by accident?'. The story unveils that Li Bao Chuan killed Prime Minister when he tried to confess what Li Bao Chuan and he did 20 years ago but suddenly The Dowager had a terrible headache as he was dying, he stuffed a letter under the carpet. When The Emperor came back, found the Prime Minister dead. It was raining that night, he and He Tian sat near the carpet and found the letter when the wind blew the carpet. He realized Li Bao chuan did it. The next night, Li Bao Chuan knew he was exposed and tried to strangle the Emperor to death and the method he killed the previous Emperor was also exposed. It was a trap set by Lady Mo for being pressured by him in knowing she was the one that caused the Princess's death and she didn't even have a baby. He committed suicide by drinking his specially made poison that was used to cause the princess's death. Lady Mo becomes crazy when hearing the news that the dowager is making He Tian the Empress as she was kind, cured her illnesses many times and was a better candidate than Lady Mo. Zhang Zhe San and Xiang Ning used her family money to buy porridge for the poor. Although He Tian became an empress, she still helped in curing the sick and old, ending the story of her leaving the Emperor to a far place.

== Legacy ==
The series also retitled as "The Mischievous Doctor", "The Imperial Physician" and "Dr. Cutie". It left a major spark in the mainland Chinese drama series and created a landmark for the historical representation of the series upcoming.
