= SL Ginga =

Japanese excursion train service

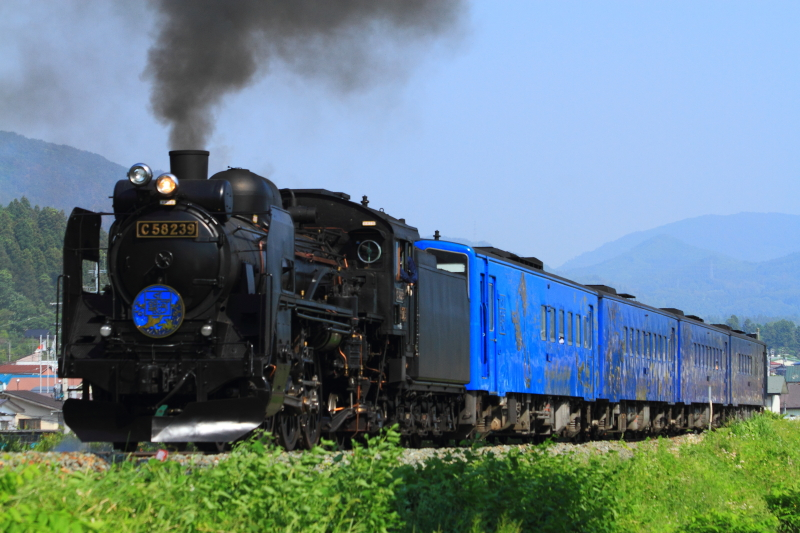
- C58 239 hauling the SL Ginga trainset on the Kamaishi Line in June 2014

Overview
- Service type: Excursion train
- Status: Abolished
- Locale: Tohoku Region
- First service: 12 April 2014
- Last service: 11 June 2023
- Current operator: JR East

Route
- Line used: Kamaishi Line

Technical
- Rolling stock: JNR Class C58 + KiHa 141 series
- Track gauge: 1,067 mm (3 ft 6 in)
- Electrification: Steam-hauled

The SL Ginga (SL銀河) was a steam-hauled "Joyful Train" (excursion train) operated by East Japan Railway Company (JR East) primarily on the Kamaishi Line in the north-east Tohoku Region of Japan from April 2014 to June 2023. The train consisted of restored JNR Class C58 steam locomotive number C58 239 together with four rebuilt former KiHa 141 series diesel cars purchased from JR Hokkaido (themselves rebuilt from earlier 50 series passenger coaches and made surplus to requirements following the electrification of the Sasshō Line in 2012). The diesel cars provided additional power to cope with the line's gradients.

== Design ==
The exterior and interior design of the train was overseen by industrial designer Ken Okuyama. The overall concept was inspired by the classic novel Night on the Galactic Railroad written by Japanese author Kenji Miyazawa, who lived in Hanamaki, Iwate. Externally, the coaches were painted blue, evoking the night sky, with constellation and animal designs on the sides. Internally, the coaches featured gaslight-style lighting and stained glass, evoking an early 20th-century atmosphere.

== Train formation ==
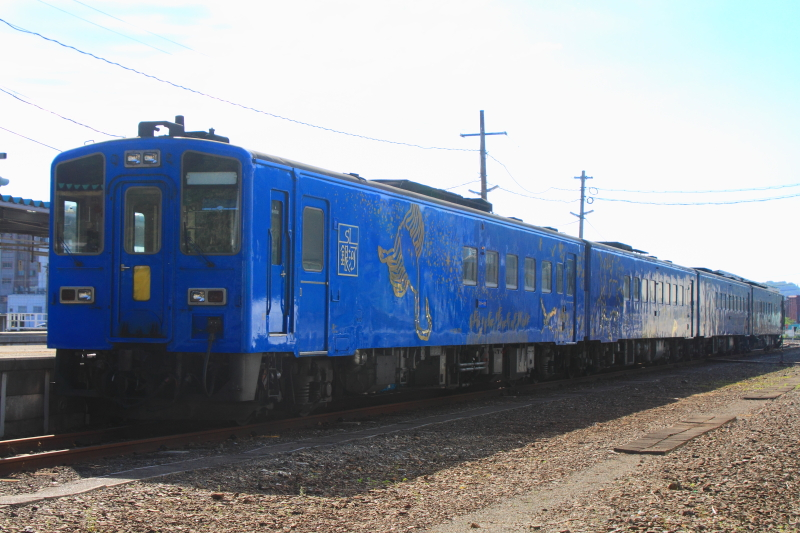
The four-car trainset formed of KiHa 141-700 series diesel cars, June 2014

The train consisted of JNR Class C58 steam locomotive number C58 239 and four coaches, formed as follows. The four coaches provide a total seating capacity of approximately 180.

| Car No. | Facilities |
|---|---|
| 1 | Lounge, shop, universal access toilet |
| 2 | Seating car with gallery space |
| 3 | Seating car with gallery space and toilet |
| 4 | Seating car with planetarium space |

=== C58 239 ===
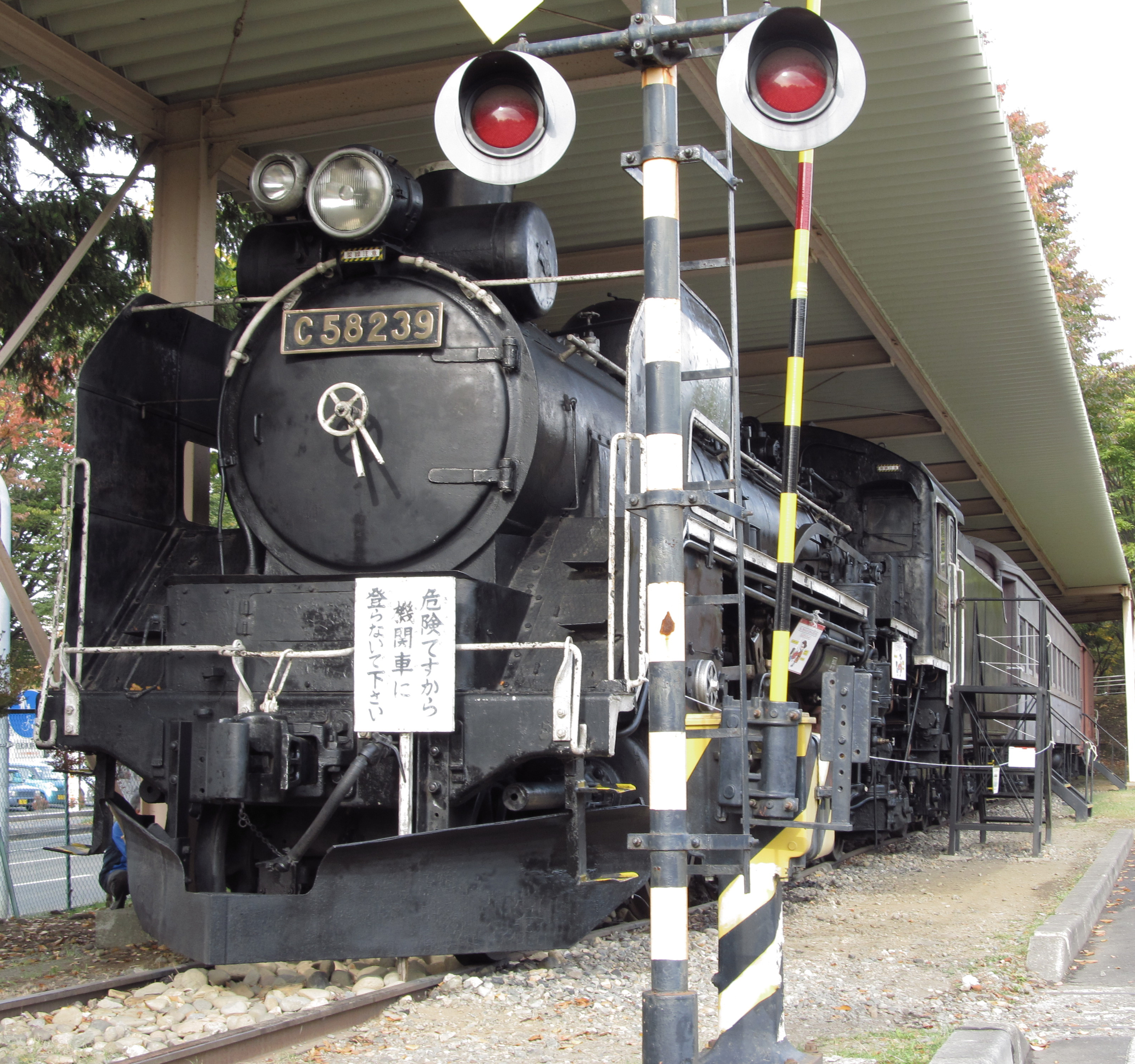
C58 239 statically preserved in a park in Morioka, October 2012

The dedicated SL Ginga train locomotive C58 239 was built in June 1940 by Kawasaki Sharyo, and was based at various depots around the country, including Nagoya, Nara, and Morioka, before being withdrawn on 22 May 1972. From 1 May 1973, it was preserved in a park in Morioka, Iwate. It was moved from the park by road to JR East's Omiya Works in Saitama Prefecture in December 2012.

== History ==
The completed train was shown off to the public at Morioka Station on 2 February 2014. It entered revenue service on 12 April 2014.

It was announced in 2021 that the service would be withdrawn in spring 2023 due to the increasing age and deterioration of the KiHa 141 passenger cars. The train made its final run on 11 June 2023 to throngs of railway enthusiasts and locals bidding it farewell. The future for the locomotive currently remains uncertain.
