= List of horror films of 2000 =

A list of horror films released in 2000.

Horror films released in 2000
Title	Director	Cast	Country	Notes
American Psycho	Mary Harron	Christian Bale, Willem Dafoe, Jared Leto	United States	
Ancient Evil: Scream of the Mummy	David DeCoteau	Ariauna Albright, Trent Latta, Jeff Peterson	United States	
Book of Shadows: Blair Witch 2	Joe Berlinger	Erica Leerhsen, Tristine Skyler, Stephen Barker Turner	United States	
The Massacre of the Burkittsville 7: The Blair Witch Legacy	Ben Rock		United States	
Bless the Child	Chuck Russell	Kim Basinger, Christina Ricci, Holliston Coleman	United States	
Blood: The Last Vampire	Hiroyuki Kitakubo		Japan	
Bloody Beach	Kim In-soo	Kim Hyun-jung, Lee Se-eun, Lee Seung-chae	South Korea	
The Calling	Richard Caesar	Laura Harris, John Standing	United States	
Cherry Falls	Geoffrey Wright	Brittany Murphy, Jay Mohr, Michael Biehn	United States	
The Convent	Mike Mendez	Adrienne Barbeau	United States	
Crocodile	Tobe Hooper	Mark McLachlan, Caitlin Martin, Summer Knight	United States	
Cut	Kimble Rendall	Molly Ringwald, Tiriel Mora, Kylie Minogue	Australia	
Deadfall	Vince Di Meglio	Kristin Leigh, Melissa Di Meglio, Paul Di Meglio	United States	
Deep in the Woods	Lionel Delplanque	Clotilde Courau, Clément Sibony, Alexia Stresi	France	
The Demon Within	Ian Merrick	Jeff Fahey, Katie Wright, Emmanuelle Vaugier	United States	
Dial D for Demons	Billy Tang Hin-Shing	Jordan Chan, Joey Meng, Lee Ann, Terence Yin, Alice Chan, Winnie Leung	Hong Kong	
Dracula 2000	Patrick Lussier	Gerard Butler, Christopher Plummer, Jonny Lee Miller	United States	
Drainiac!	Brett Piper	Georgia Hatzis, Ethan Krasnoo, Samara Doucette	United States	
Faust: Love of the Damned	Brian Yuzna	Mark Frost, Isabel Brook, Jennifer Rope	Spain	
Final Destination	James Wong	Devon Sawa, Ali Larter, Seann William Scott	United States	
Ginger Snaps	John Fawcett	Emily Perkins, Katharine Isabelle, Kris Lemche	Canada	
Hellraiser: Inferno	Scott Derrickson	Craig Sheffer, Nicholas Turturro, Doug Bradley	United States	
Hollow Man	Paul Verhoeven	Kevin Bacon, Elisabeth Shue, Josh Brolin	United States	Science fiction horror
Hollywood Mortuary	Ron Ford	Denice Stradling, Anita Page, David DeCoteau, Tim Murphy, Conrad Brooks	United States	Horror comedy
In the Light of the Moon	Chuck Parello	Steve Railsback, Carrie Snodgress, Carol Mansell	United States	
The Irrefutable Truth About Demons	Glenn Standring	Karl Urban, Katie Wolfe	New Zealand	
Isola	Toshiyuki Mizutani	Yoshino Kimura, Yu Kurosawa, Ken Ishiguro	Japan	
Ju-On: The Curse	Takashi Shimizu	Yuurei Yanagi, Ryôta Koyama, Kazushi Andô	Japan	
Ju-On: The Curse 2	Takashi Shimizu	Makoto Ashikawa, Yûko Daike, Kaori Fujii	Japan	
Killjoy	Craig Ross Jr.	Lee Marks, William L. Johnson, Jamal Grimes	United States	
Leprechaun in the Hood	Rob Spera	Warwick Davis, Ice-T	United States	
Lost Souls	Janusz Kamiński	Winona Ryder, Ben Chaplin, Sarah Wynter	United States	Supernatural horror
Paranoid	Ash Smith	Brandon O'Dell, Bob Harter, Lisa Arnold	United States	Slasher film
Pitch Black	David Twohy	Vin Diesel, Radha Mitchell, Cole Hauser	United States	Science fiction ~ alien lifeform
Prison of the Dead	Julin Breen	Alicia Arden, Patrick Flood, Debra Mayer	United States	
Psycho Beach Party	Robert Lee King	Lauren Ambrose, Thomas Gibson, Kimberley Davies	United States	Comedy horror
Python	Richard Clabaugh	Robert Englund, Jenny McCarthy, Casper Van Dien	United States	
Ring 0: Birthday	Norio Tsuruta	Yukie Nakama, Seiichi Tanabe, Kumiko Asō, Yoshiko Tanaka	Japan	
Scary Movie	Keenan Ivory Wayans	Anna Faris, Jon Abrahams, Carmen Electra	United States	Horror comedy
School Day of the Dead	Tetsuo Shinohara	Thane Camus, Masaya Katô, Yôzaburô Itô	Japan	
Scrapbook	Eric Stanze	Angelina Sanderson, Sam Maiden Jr., Emily Haack	United States	
Scream 3	Wes Craven	David Arquette, Neve Campbell, Courteney Cox, Parker Posey, Patrick Dempsey, Scott Foley	United States	
Shadow of the Vampire	E. Elias Merhige	John Malkovich, Willem Dafoe, Cary Elwes	United States; United Kingdom	
Shriek If You Know What I Did Last Friday the Thirteenth	John Blanchard	Tiffani Amber Thiessen, Coolio, Julie Benz	United States	Horror comedy
Subconscious Cruelty	Karim Hussain	Brea Asher, Eric Pettigrew	Canada	
Supernova	Thomas Lee	James Spader, Angela Bassett, Robert Forster	United States	Science fiction horror
They Nest	Ellory Elkayem	Thomas Calabro, Shaina Tianne Unger, John Savage	United States	
Tomie: Replay	Tomijiro Mitsuishi	Yoshiko Yura, Kumija Kim, Ken'ichi Endô	Japan	
Urban Legends: Final Cut	John Ottman	Jennifer Morrison, Matthew Davis, Hart Bochner	United States	
Uzumaki	Higuchinsky	Ren Osugi, Hinako Saeki	Japan	
Vampire Hunter D: Bloodlust	Yoshiaki Kawajiri	Hideyuki Tanaka, Ichirô Nagai, Megumi Hayashibara	Japan	
Versus	Ryuhei Kitamura	Tak Sakaguchi, Hideo Sakaki, Chieko Misaka	Japan	
Voodoo Academy	David DeCoteau	Chad Burris, Ben Indra, Debra Mayer	United States	
What Lies Beneath	Robert Zemeckis	Harrison Ford, Michelle Pfeiffer, Katherine Towne	United States	
Witchcraft XI: Sisters in Blood	Ron Ford	Mikul Robins, Anita Page, Mark Shady	United States	
