= Eun-jae =

- Hangul: 은재
- RR: Eunjae
- MR: Ŭnjae
- IPA: [ɯndʑɛ]

Eun-jae is a Korean given name.

Notable people with the name include:

- Ejae (Kim Eun-jae, born 1991), South Korean and American singer
- Jaejae (Lee Eun-jae, born 1990), South Korean producer, host and television personality

Fictional characters with this name include:

- Cha Eun-jae, in 2005 South Korean television series Only You
- Goo Eun-jae, in 2008 South Korean television series Temptation of Wife
- Lee Eun-jae, in 2011 South Korean television series Can't Lose
- Yoo Eun-jae, in 2012 South Korean television series Wild Romance
- Cha Eun-jae, in 2020 South Korean television series Dr. Romantic 2

== See also ==
- List of Korean given names
