= Ad Genius Lee Tae-baek =

2013 South Korean television series

- Promotional poster for Ad Genius Lee Tae-baek
- Also known as: Advertising Genius Lee Tae-baek
- Hangul: 광고천재 이태백
- Hanja: 廣告天才 李太白
- RR: Gwanggocheonjae I Taebaek
- MR: Kwanggoch'ŏnjae I T'aebaek
- Genre: Workplace drama Romance
- Written by: Seol Joon-seok; Lee Jae-ha; Lee Yoon-jong
- Directed by: Park Ki-ho; Lee So-yeon
- Starring: Jin Goo; Park Ha-sun; Jo Hyun-jae; Han Chae-young
- Composers: Oh Joon-seong; Lee Im-woo
- Country of origin: South Korea
- Original language: Korean
- No. of episodes: 16

Production
- Executive producers: Lee Jae-young; Yoo Geon-shik
- Producer: Kim Jin-woo
- Production location: Korea
- Cinematography: Uhm Joon-seong; Lee Young-seob
- Editor: Han Ok-geum
- Running time: 60 minutes Mondays and Tuesdays at 21:55 (KST)
- Production companies: Raemongraein Co., Ltd.

Original release
- Network: KBS2
- Release: February 4 – March 26, 2013

Ad Genius Lee Tae-baek (Korean: 광고천재 이태백) is a 2013 South Korean television series starring Jin Goo, Park Ha-sun, Jo Hyun-jae and Han Chae-young. Set in the cutthroat field of advertising where creativity and competition coexist, the drama is the success story of underdog Lee Tae-baek who fights his way to becoming the best ad man in the business. It aired on KBS2 from February 4 to March 26, 2013, on Mondays and Tuesdays at 21:55 (KST) for 16 episodes.

The protagonist is loosely based on internationally renowned advertising designer and social activist Jeseok Yi (a.k.a. Jeski), who wrote the 2010 book Ad Genius Lee Je-seok.

The drama reunites Han Chae-young and Jo Hyun-jae who previously worked together in the 2005 TV series Only You.

== Synopsis ==
Drama series depicts the lives and love of people working in the advertisement industry.

Lee Tae-baek (Jin Goo) is extremely talented but, due to his poor resume, goes through difficulties as he attempts to succeed in the advertising world.

Baek Ji-yoon (Park Ha-sun) is an intern at Geumsan Ad Company. She tries to do her best regardless of the task. Ji-yoon is full of passion and becomes involved with Lee Tae-Baek.

Go Ah-ri (Han Chae-young) is an ad planner at Geumsan Ad Company. She's a confident and sexy woman. In order to achieve her dream, she throws away her past and her love.

== Cast ==
=== Main ===
- Jin Goo as Lee Tae-baek

Having come to Seoul from the countryside with nothing but a high school diploma and a gift for drawing, he starts out by handing out ads in the street and wearing sandwich boards. Through sheer hard work (the word "genius" in the title is meant ironically), he is determined to fulfill his dream of becoming the best ad man in the biz.

- Park Ha-sun as Baek Ji-yoon

A copywriter intern at an advertising firm. She hides her identity as the daughter of a chaebol to work her way up the ladder. Sincere and hardworking, her journey will parallel Tae-baek's as they fight for their jobs every step of the way.

- Han Chae-young as Go Ah-ri / Bok-hee
  - Lee Sae-rom as young Go Ah-ri

She is a glamorous, sophisticated, ambitious and pragmatic art director who sacrificed her past and her love to get to the top.

- Jo Hyun-jae as Addie Kang

A cool-headed ad executive, he comes back from the US to continue his family's ad agency dominance.

=== Supporting ===
==== People in GRC ====
- Ko Chang-seok as Ma Jin-ga

CEO of a tiny ad company. He becomes a key player in changing Lee Tae-baek's fate.

- Kwak Hee-sung as Ma Yi-chan

Son of Ma Jin-ga

- Ah Young as Gong Sun-hye
- Bang Dae-han as Hassan

==== People in Geumsan Ad Company ====
- Choi Jung-woo as Kang Han-chul

CEO of Geumsan Ad, an advertising agency affiliated with Geumsan Group

- Hong Ji-min as Lee Eun-hee

Creative Director of Geumsan Ad Company whose current creative block has driven her to hysterics.

- Shin Seung-hwan as Shin Dong-hoon

Ad producer who has learned the art of covering up for his lack of skill with a glib tongue.

- Lee Jung-kil as Kim Jong-wook
- Yang Hee-yoon as Jang Min-ah
- Lee Hae-young as Executive Director Hwang

==== Lee Tae-baek's family ====
- Han Sun-hwa as Lee So-ran

Tae-baek's younger sister

- Jung Young-sook as Ji Kwan-soon

Tae-baek's grandmother who took care of him and his sister in their parents' absence

==== Others ====
- Yoo In-young as Han Byul
- Kim Joon-bae as a jjajangmyeon restaurant owner
- Jang Yong as Chairman Baek
- Bang Eun-hee as Won Mi-ok

Ji-yoon's hot-tempered aunt, who is devoted to her niece and ready to do anything for her if necessary.

- Lee Dae-ro as President Nam
- Lee Dae-yeon as President Choi

== Ratings ==
Ep.	Original broadcast date	Average audience share			
Ep.	Original broadcast date	AGB Nielsen		TNmS	
Ep.	Original broadcast date	Nationwide	Seoul	Nationwide	Seoul
1	February 4, 2013	4.3%	4.3%	5.2%	6.0%
2	February 5, 2013	4.4%	5.0%	5.1%	5.3%
3	February 11, 2013	4.4%	5.4%	4.8%	5.7%
4	February 12, 2013	4.4%	4.8%	5.3%	5.4%
5	February 18, 2013	4.0%	4.7%	5.3%	6.2%
6	February 19, 2013	3.9%	4.0%	5.4%	5.8%
7	February 25, 2013	4.3%	5.3%	4.1%	4.8%
8	February 26, 2013	4.0%	4.6%	4.4%	4.9%
9	March 4, 2013	3.5%	4.0%	3.9%	4.3%
10	March 5, 2013	4.2%	5.2%	4.0%	5.0%
11	March 11, 2013	3.5%	3.9%	4.4%	4.5%
12	March 12, 2013	3.5%	4.0%	4.1%	5.1%
13	March 18, 2013	3.8%	4.4%	3.9%	4.0%
14	March 19, 2013	3.7%	4.3%	4.0%	5.0%
15	March 25, 2013	3.6%	4.1%	3.8%	4.5%
16	March 26, 2013	6.3%	6.7%	5.5%	5.7%
In this table, the blue numbers represent the lowest ratings and the red numbers represent the highest ratings.
