= The Record (film) =

- Hangul: 찍히면 죽는다
- RR: Jjikhimyeon jungneunda
- MR: Tchikhimyŏn chungnŭnda
- Directed by: Kim Ki-hun
- Screenplay by: Choo Ki-suck; Han Chang-hak
- Produced by: Park Il-seo
- Starring: Kang Seong-min; Park Eun-hye
- Cinematography: Chung Chung-hoon
- Edited by: Kyung Min-ho
- Music by: Lee Sang-yong; Lee Jong-gyo
- Production company: Sam Woo Communications
- Release date: 26 August 2000
- Running time: 90 minutes
- Country: South Korea

The Record (Korean: 찍히면 죽는다; RR: Jjikhimyeon jungneunda) is a 2000 South Korean horror film starring Kang Seong-min, Park Eun-hye and Han Chae-young.

== Plot ==
The film centers on a group of young people who killed an innocent person and videotaped the act for their own amusement. Comeuppance is provided by a mysterious man who seeks out each of the murderers and kills them for his personal pleasure.

== Cast ==
- Kang Seong-min as Hyung-joon
- Park Eun-hye as Hee-jung
- Ahn Jae-hwan as Teacher
- Jung Min as Jong-ho
- Bae Dal as Kyung-sik
- Bae Jun-hyeong as Kyung-sik
- Han Chae-young as Eun-mi
- Roh Ma-yu as School nurse
- Choi Yu-rim
- Jang Tae-yun
- Kim Seo-hyung
- Lee Yeong-ho
- Uhm Ji-won

== Background ==
In South Korean cinema, landmark year was 2003 when more artistically ambitious and thematically complex types of horror cinema were released. Prior to this, there was an early 2000s horror cycle involving slasher films such as Bloody Beach, Harpy, Nightmare and The Record.

== Release ==
The Record was released on August 26, 2000. The film had 30,130 admissions in South Korea. The film failed to reach the top ten grossing films domestically in South Korea for the year 2000. In comparison, the horror film Nightmare had 332,000 admissions and was among the top ten highest grossing domestic productions of the year.

== Reception ==
From contemporary reviews, Bruce Holecheck of Deep Red magazine described the film as a Korean I Know What You Did Last Summer that "forgets to ladle on the massive grue which made the early 80's teen-kill wave so much fun." and that the film was unoriginal but still a slasher film "that's not referential to the point of insult to true fans." Jim Harper in his book Legacy of Blood also compared the film to I Know What You Did Last Summer, noting the Americanization of the film with comparing the characters to characters in Porky's and Animal House but "Despite the derivative material, it's a highly entertaining film." and that "There's no attempt at irony or post-modernism, just good ol' slasher fun."
