= Kim Hyun-jung =

Kim Hyun-jung, Kim Hyeon-jung or Kim Hyeon-jeong is a transliteration of one Korean name (김현정). It may refer to:

- Kim Hyun-jung (singer) (born 1976), South Korean pop singer
- Big Mama King (born 1973), South Korean jazz singer
- Kim Hyeon-jung (figure skater) (born 1992)
- Kim Hyun-jung (painter) (born 1988), South Korean painter

== See also ==
- Kim Hyun-joong, South Korean singer
- Kim Hyung-jun, South Korean singer
