= Jo Hyun-jae =

South Korean actor (born 1980)

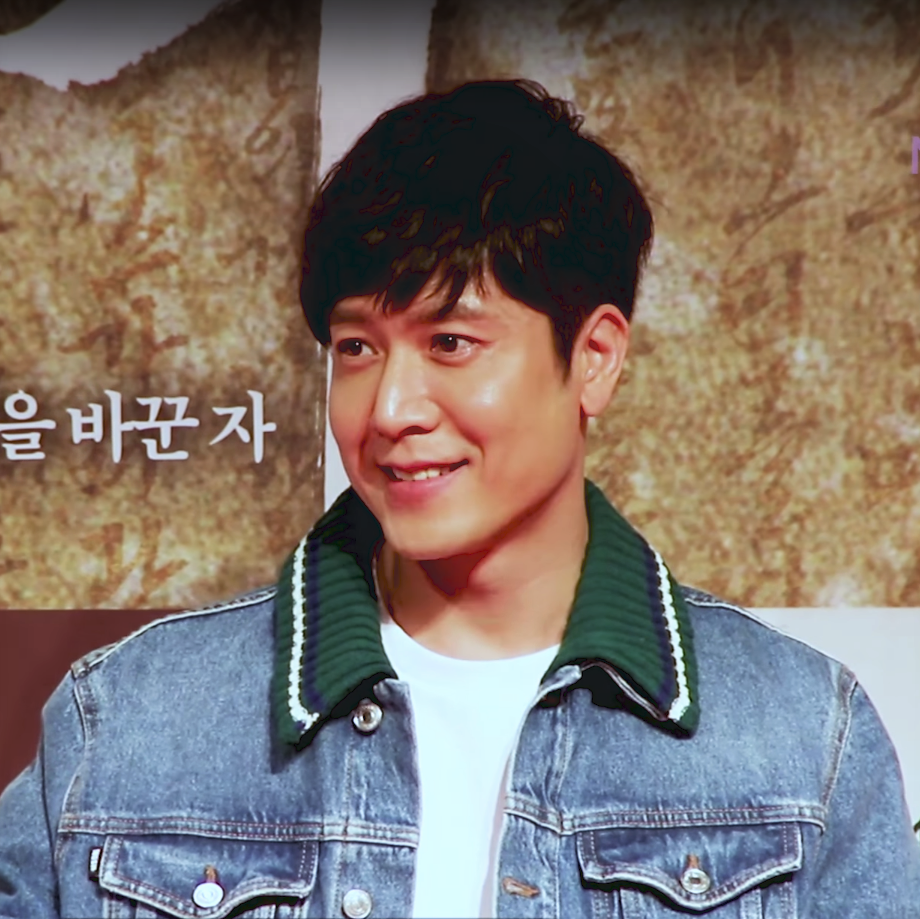
- Jo in February 2018
- Born: May 9, 1980 (age 46); Seoul, South Korea
- Education: Myongji University; Dankook University – Theater and Film
- Occupation: Actor
- Years active: 1998–present
- Agent: Ascendio
- Spouse: Park Min-jung (m. 2018)

Korean name
- Hangul: 조현재
- Hanja: 趙顯宰
- RR: Jo Hyeonjae
- MR: Cho Hyŏnjae

Jo Hyun-jae (Korean: 조현재; born May 9, 1980) is a South Korean actor. Jo made his entertainment debut as a singer in the four-member boy band Guardian, which disbanded after releasing their self-titled album in 1998. In 2000, after he drew popularity when he appeared in a commercial for sports drink Pocari Sweat, Jo began acting. He is best known for his leading roles in Love Letter (2003), Only You (2005), Ballad of Seodong (2005), and 49 Days (2011).

== Personal life ==
On March 18, 2018, Jo announced his plans of marriage to his non-celebrity girlfriend a retired professional golfer. The couple dated for three years and married on March 24, 2018. Their first child was born on November 20, 2018. On October 27, 2021, his wife gave birth to a second daughter.

== Filmography ==
=== Television series ===
Year	Title	Role	Notes/Ref.
2000	KAIST	Jang Dong-ha (episode 75)	
2000	Golden Pond	Art instructor	
2001	Father and Sons	Jong-du	
2001	That's Perfect!	Hyun-jae	
2002	The Great Ambition	Prince Sumyeong	
2003	Love Letter	Lee Woo-jin / Andrew	
2003	First Love	Han Young-woo	
2004	Star's Echo	Yoo Sung-jae	
2004	Sunlight Pours Down	Jung Eun-sup	
2004	Forbidden Love	Kang Min-woo	
2005	Only You	Han Yi-joon	
2005	Ballad of Seodong	Seodong	
2008	One Mom and Three Dads	Han Soo-hyun	
2011	49 Days	Han Kang	
2013	Rouge Hegemon	Xiao Wu Ke	Chinese drama
2013	Ad Genius Lee Tae-baek	Addie Kang	
2013	The King's Daughter	Crown Prince Myeongnong	
2014	Youth Storm	Ye Zi Xuan	Chinese drama
2015	Yong-pal	Han Do-joon	
2017	Hospital Ship	Jang Sung-ho	Cameo appearance
2018	Let Me Introduce Her	Kang Ki-chan	

=== Variety shows ===
Year	Title	Role	Notes/Ref.
2019	Same Bed, Different Dreams 2: You Are My Destiny	Guest Couple	(episode 104–122) with his wife Park Min-jung
2021	The Time We Were Together	Narrator	audio book lectures

=== Film ===
Year	Title	Role	Notes
2003	Untold Scandal	Kwon In-ho	
2004	Joy of Love	Travis1984	Internet short film
2008	The Guard Post	1st Lt. Yoo Jeong-u	
2014	The Actress Is Too Much	Hong Jin-woo	

=== Music video appearances ===
Year	Song title	Artist
2007	"Love's Greeting"	SeeYa
2007	"Ice Doll"	SeeYa

== Discography ==
Album information	Track listing
가디안 (Guardian): Artist: Guardian; Album; Released: May 1, 1998	Track listing: 1. Intro; 2. 슬픈 인연; 3. 아르바이트; 4. 세상이 가르쳐준 이별; 5. 수호천사; 6. 빨라 빨라; 7. 애상; 8. 미스터 플라워; 9. 죄와 벌 10. 일요일 아침같은 그대; 11. 혼돈; 12. Outro
다른 공간, 같은 추억 (Different Space, Same Memory): Artist: Jo Hyun-jae; Digital single; Label: DMS Communications; Released: March 30, 2009	Track listing: 1. 그대가 내게 해준 말 (Words You Said to Me); 2. 바람처럼 그대 곁에 (Beside You Like the Wind); 3. 내 꿈을 하늘에 뿌린다 (Scatter My Dreams Across the Sky); 4. 그대가 내게 해준 말 (Words You Said to Me) (Inst.); 5. 바람처럼 그대 곁에 (Beside You Like the Wind) (Inst.); 6. 내 꿈을 하늘에 뿌린다 (Scatter My Dreams Across the Sky) (Inst.)
단 하루를 살아도 (Even If I Live Just One Day): Artist: Jo Hyun-jae; Track from 49 Days OST; Label: Star Entry Entertainment, Danal; Released: April 25, 2011	Track listing: 1. 단 하루를 살아도 (Even If I Live Just One Day); 2. 단 하루를 살아도 (Even If I Live Just One Day) (Inst.); 3. 단 하루를 살아도 (Even If I Live Just One Day) (MR)

== Awards and nominations ==
Year	Award	Category	Nominated work	Result
2003	SBS Drama Awards	New Star Award	First Love	Won
2005	SBS Drama Awards	Top 10 Stars	Only You, Ballad of Seodong	Won
2006	42nd Baeksang Arts Awards	Most Popular Actor (TV)	Ballad of Seodong	Won
2007	Andre Kim Best Star Awards	Star Award	—N/a	Won
2011	19th Korean Culture and Entertainment Awards	Hallyu Star Award	49 Days	Won
2011	SBS Drama Awards	Excellence Award, Actor in a Drama Special	49 Days	Nominated
2013	MBC Drama Awards	Excellence Award, Actor in a Serial Drama	The King's Daughter	Nominated
2018	6th APAN Star Awards	Excellence Award, Actor in a Serial Drama	Let Me Introduce Her	Nominated
2018	26th Korea Culture and Entertainment Awards	Best Actor	Let Me Introduce Her	Won
