= Save the Family =

- Promotional poster
- Genre: Family; Melodrama
- Written by: Hong Young-hee
- Directed by: Jun Sung-hong
- Starring: Jae Hee; Kang Byul; Jung Hye-in
- Music by: Lee Chang-hee
- Country of origin: South Korea
- Original language: Korean
- No. of episodes: 123 (120+3)

Production
- Executive producer: Park Ki-ho
- Producer: Lee Jeong-seob
- Running time: 35 minutes
- Production company: KBS

Original release
- Network: KBS1
- Release: May 11 – October 30, 2015

Save the Family (Korean: 가족을 지켜라; RR: Gajogeul jikyeora; lit. Protect the Family) is a 2015 South Korean daily drama starring Jae Hee, Kang Byul and Jung Hye-in. It aired on KBS1 on Mondays to Fridays at 20:25 for 123 episodes from May 11 to October 30, 2015.

== Plot ==
A family drama that looks at the meaning of 'family' and the duties of parents and children through a three-generation families.

Jung Woo-jin (Jae Hee), an ambitious doctor, is not successful in his career and in his love life due to his family background. After he is passed over for a promotion as a specialist, he works in a small hospital emergency room near his home. He is in love with Go Ye-won (Jung Hye-in) but her family strongly oppose their relationship.

One day, Woo-jin meets Lee Hae-soo (Kang Byul) after getting drunk which causes misunderstandings between them. However, Woo-jin and Hae-soo encounter each other often as they live in the same neighbourhood and Hae-soo works in the same hospital as a kitchen assistant to a chef in the hospital cafeteria. Gradually, they develop feelings for each other. But their relationship is opposed by Woo-jin's family who has high expectations for his future.

Having failed in love and no longer believes in true love, Woo-jin resigns to his mother Bok Soo-ja's (Lee Hwi-hyang) wish and decides to marry Ye-won. Will Soo-ja's wish come true?

== Cast ==
=== Main characters ===
- Jae Hee as Jung Woo-jin
- Kang Byul as Lee Hae-soo
- Jung Hye-in as Go Ye-won

=== Supporting characters ===
- Choi Il-hwa as Jung Man-jae
- Lee Hwi-hyang as Bok Soo-ja
- Byun Hee-bong as Jung Soo-bong
- Ban Hyo-jung as Cha Ong-shim
- Narsha as Jung Hee-jin
- Park Chul-ho as Jung Ho-jae
- Im Sung-min as Na Ae-ran
- Shin Seung-hwan as Jung Tae-jin
- Im Chae-won as Choi Yoon-jung
- Kim Dong-yoon as Choi Yoon-chan
- Lee Yul-eum as Oh Se-mi
- Jung Da-bin as Son Da-hye
- Jo Young-min as Ji-won
- Ham Sung-min as Lee Jung-su
- Romina as Mina
- Aleyna as Dongbaek

== Awards and nominations ==
Year	Award	Category	Recipient	Result
2015	4th APAN Star Awards	Excellence Award, Actor in a Serial Drama	Jae Hee	Nominated
2015	KBS Drama Awards	Excellence Award, Actor in a Daily Drama	Jae Hee	Nominated
2015	KBS Drama Awards	Excellence Award, Actress in a Daily Drama	Kang Byul	Won
2015	KBS Drama Awards	Best Supporting Actor	Choi Il-hwa	Nominated
