= 3-Iron =

2004 South Korean film directed by Kim Ki-duk

- Korean theatrical release poster
- Hangul: 빈집
- Lit.: Empty House
- RR: Binjip
- MR: Pinjip
- Directed by: Kim Ki-duk
- Written by: Kim Ki-duk
- Produced by: Kim Ki-duk
- Starring: Lee Seung-yeon; Jae Hee
- Music by: SLVIAN
- Production companies: Kim Ki-duk Film; Cineclick Asia
- Distributed by: Big Blue Film
- Release dates: September 2004 (Venice Film Festival); April 29, 2005 (South Korea)
- Running time: 88 minutes
- Countries: South Korea; Japan
- Language: Korean
- Box office: US$3.4 million

3-Iron (Korean: 빈집) is a 2004 romantic drama film written, produced and directed by Kim Ki-duk. An international co-production between South Korea and Japan, the film stars Jae Hee as a young drifter who develops a relationship with an abused housewife (Lee Seung-yeon). The film's title is derived from a type of golf club used prominently throughout the narrative.

3-Iron premiered in competition at the 61st Venice International Film Festival in September 2004, where it was nominated for the Golden Lion and won Kim the Silver Lion for Best Direction. It was released in South Korea on April 29, 2005, and received generally positive reviews and numerous accolades, including the FIPRESCI Grand Prix award at the San Sebastián Film Festival.

== Plot ==
Tae-suk (Jae Hee) is a loner who drives around on his motorbike, taping takeout menus over the keyholes of front doors and breaking into apartments where the menus have not been removed. He lives in those apartments while their owners are away, washing their clothes, mending their broken appliances, and taking selfies with their possessions. When he breaks into one large home, he is unaware that he is being watched by an abused housewife and former model Sun-hwa (Lee Seung-yeon). Tae-suk leaves after making eye contact with Sun-hwa, but then returns. He witnesses Sun-hwa's husband Min-gyu abusing her and proceeds to catch his attention by practicing golf in the yard. He buffets Min-gyu with golf balls and then leaves with Sun-hwa.

Tae-suk and Sun-hwa begin a silent relationship, moving from one apartment to another, with Tae-suk occasionally practicing hitting golf balls by drilling holes in them, inserted a cord through the holes, and securing the cords with a knot around the bases of tree trunks. In one home, after drinking, they are caught by the returning owners, sleeping in their bed and wearing their pajamas. The male homeowner, a boxer, repeatedly punches Tae-suk. Later, Tae-suk practices hitting a golf ball tied to a tree, and the ball breaks loose from its cord, breaking through the windshield of a nearby car and brutally striking the car's passenger in their head. Tae-suk, awash with guilt, is comforted by Sun-hwa.

The next night, Tae-suk and Sun-hwa break into a hanok, where they sit quietly, drink tea, and share a kiss. They later enter an apartment where they discover the dead body of an elderly man. They proceed to give him a proper burial. The following day, the elderly man's son and daughter-in-law arrive at the apartment, and assume that Tae-suk and Sun-hwa killed him. Tae-suk and Sun-hwa are apprehended and interrogated by police, but remain silent. Tae-suk's camera is confiscated, and the owners of the homes seen in the photos on the camera are contacted. The police learn that nothing was stolen from any of the houses, and an investigation reveals that the old man died of lung cancer. Min-gyu arrives to take Sun-hwa home, and bribes the policeman in charge of the investigation to allow him to strike Tae-suk with golf balls. Tae-suk ends up attacking the police officer and is sent to jail. There, he practices golf with an imaginary club and balls and develops his gifts for stealth and concealment, frustrating his jailers by remaining out of sight.

Tae-suk is released from prison, and Min-gyu prepares himself in case he returns for Sun-hwa. With his improved stealth, Tae-suk is able to rejoin Sun-hwa in her house, using his skills to evade Min-gyu's detection. Sun-hwa appears to say "I love you" to Min-gyu and embraces him, but kisses Tae-suk over his shoulder. When Min-gyu leaves on a business trip, Sun-hwa and Tae-suk stand together on a scale. Text then appears, reading: "It's hard to tell whether the world we live in is either a reality or a dream."

== Cast ==
- Lee Seung-yeon as Sun-hwa
- Jae Hee as Tae-suk
- Kwon Hyuk-ho as Min-gyu
- Choi Jeong-ho as Jailor
- Lee Ju-seok as Son of Old Man
- Lee Mi-suk as Daughter of Old Man
- Moon Sung-hyuk as Sung-hyuk
- Park Ji-a as Ji-ah
- Jang Jae-yong as Hyun-soo

== Themes and interpretations ==
According to author Hye Seung Chung, the use of silence in 3-Iron evokes the writing of Hungarian film theorist Béla Balázs, who described silence as "one of the most dramatic effects of the sound film". The film's use of silence is partly derived by Kim's experiences in Paris, France, where he learned to understand other people by observing their expressions and behavior, despite him not being able to understand the French language. In a 2005 interview with Time Out, Kim stated: "I want the audience to watch the characters more closely by reducing the dialogue as much as possible. Most movies have too much dialogue; I don't think words make everything understandable".

3-Iron has also been described as exploring social status and "issues of marginality, voicelessness, and invisibility" in South Korea. Seung Chung describes Tae-suk and Sun-hwa—presented at varying points in the film as either inaudible or invisible—as being "of liminal class affiliations." Writer Sheng-mei Ma similarly notes Sun-hwa and Tae-suk as being "marginalized, 'half-human' protagonists". Tae-suk is depicted as a transient with no known family, and from dialogue in which Min-gyu recounts having wired money to Sun-hwa's family, it can be inferred that he and Sun-hwa are in an interclass marriage, with Sun-hwa hailing from a family of lower economic status than Min-gyu. Ma writes that the film uses "the universal symbol of golf as a sign of affluence", with Tae-suk, "not yet awakened from the dream of social status and power, [... copying] the lifestyle of the rich through golf practice." He notes that Sun-hwa "instinctively tries to stop that emulation", but fails, resulting in Tae-suk striking an innocent woman with a stray ball.

Writing of the latter half of the film, Seung Chung describes Tae-suk as "literally [becoming] invisible after mastering the ability to hide in the shadowy jail cell, outside the purview of human vision, through metaphysical 'ghost practice'". The term "ghost practice" (유령 연습; yuryeong yeonseup) was coined by Kim himself and used in a number of local interviews about 3-Iron. Film critic A. O. Scott, in his review of the film for The New York Times, suggests that Tae-suk "becomes a phantom of cinema, hiding on the edge of the frame and taking advantage of the literal-minded folk who haven't fully grasped the potential of the medium." Seung Chung wrote that the final shot of the film, in which Sun-hwa and Tae-suk stand together on a scale that displays a weight of zero, implies the couple's "mutual transcendence of bodily existence." Ma refers to the ending as "ambiguous", writing that Sun-hwa "may well be imagining a union with her ghost lover, or their love may have indeed freed them from their bodies."

In a 2004 interview with Kim for Cine 21, Chong Song-il interpreted Tae-suk as "Sun-hwa's fantasy", serving as a figure of rescue from her abusive marriage. This interpretation was corroborated by Kim, but Kim also suggested an interpretation wherein Sun-hwa is a figment of Tae-suk's imagination, delivering him from his solitary visits to empty houses.

== Release ==
3-Iron premiered in competition at the 61st Venice International Film Festival in September 2004. The South Korean premiere took place at the Busan International Film Festival the next month, and went on a theatrical release by Happinet Pictures on October 15, 2004.

Sony Pictures Classics distributed the film in the United States and received a limited theatrical release on April 29, 2005.

=== Home media ===
Sony Pictures Home Entertainment released the film in DVD on September 6, 2005.

== Reception ==
=== Box office ===
The film opened in South Korea on April 29, 2005, and went on to gross $241,914 domestically. It grossed $3,403,957 worldwide.

=== Critical response ===
On the review aggregator website Rotten Tomatoes, the film has an approval rating of 87% based on 92 reviews, with an average score of 7.4/10. The site's critical consensus reads: "A tender and moving romance from Spring, Summer, Fall, Winter... And Spring's director Kim Ki-Duk." The film holds a score of 72 out of 100 on Metacritic based on 28 reviews, indicating "Generally favorable reviews".

A. O. Scott of The New York Times noted the "sophisticated modern sound design" exhibited in 3-Iron, and called the film "a teasing, self-conscious and curiously heartfelt demonstration of [Kim's] mischievous formal ingenuity." Dennis Schwartz of Ozus' World Movie Reviews called the film "an unusual original story that's rooted in a Buddhist parable [...] of seeing the world as a dream". James Mudge of Beyond Hollywood called it "an almost ethereal, yet truly captivating film which is fascinating and moving", writing that "it is quite likely that viewers will not even realize the lack of dialogue". Jamie Woolley of BBC.com gave the film three out of five stars, writing: "3-Iron isn't going to win any prizes for furthering of the cause of female emancipation. But if the snail's pace doesn't send you to sleep, you'll be rewarded with a tender and unusual love story."

== Accolades ==
Year	Award	Category	Recipient	Result
2004	Venice International Film Festival	FIPRESCI Prize	Kim Ki-duk	Won
2004	Venice International Film Festival	Golden Lion	Kim Ki-duk	Nominated
2004	Venice International Film Festival	Little Golden Lion	Kim Ki-duk	Won
2004	Venice International Film Festival	SIGNIS Award - Honorable Mention	Kim Ki-duk	Won
2004	Venice International Film Festival	Silver Lion for Best Direction	Kim Ki-duk	Won
2004	Korean Association of Film Critics Awards	Best Screenplay	Kim Ki-duk	Won
2004	Korean Film Awards	Best Film	3-Iron	Nominated
2004	Korean Film Awards	Best Director	Kim Ki-duk	Nominated
2004	Korean Film Awards	Best Screenplay	Kim Ki-duk	Nominated
2004	Valladolid Film Festival	Golden Spike Award	Kim Ki-duk	Won
2005	Baeksang Arts Awards	Best Film	3-Iron	Nominated
2005	Baeksang Arts Awards	Best Director	Kim Ki-duk	Nominated
2005	Baeksang Arts Awards	Best New Actor	Jae Hee	Nominated
2005	Blue Dragon Film Awards	Best Director	Kim Ki-duk	Nominated
2005	Blue Dragon Film Awards	Best New Actor	Jae Hee	Won
2005	David di Donatello Awards	Best Foreign Film	3-Iron	Nominated
2005	Italian National Syndicate of Film Journalists	Silver Ribbon	Kim Ki-duk	Nominated
2005	San Sebastián Film Festival	FIPRESCI Grand Prix	Kim Ki-duk	Won
2005	Vilnius International Film Festival	The Audience Award	3-Iron	Won
2006	Belgian Syndicate of Cinema Critics	Grand Prix	Kim Ki-duk	Won

== See also ==
- Hide N' Seek, 2012 Indian remake
- List of Korean-language films

== Bibliography ==
- Ma, Sheng-mei (2012). Asian Diaspora and East-West Modernity. Comparative Cultural Studies. Purdue University Press. ISBN 978-1557536112.
- Chung, HyeSeung (2012). Kim Ki-duk. Contemporary Film Directors. University of Illinois Press. ISBN 978-0252078415.
