= Dummy Mommy =

2012 South Korean television series

- Promotional poster
- Also known as: Stupid Mom; Foolish Mom
- Genre: Family, Drama, Comedy
- Based on: Dummy Mommy by Choi Yoo-kyung
- Written by: Park Kye-ok
- Directed by: Lee Dong-hoon
- Starring: Kim Hyun-joo; Ha Hee-ra
- Country of origin: South Korea
- Original language: Korean
- No. of episodes: 20

Production
- Production company: Midas Pictures (now May Queen Pictures)

Original release
- Network: SBS TV
- Release: 17 March – 20 May 2012

Dummy Mommy (Korean: 바보엄마; RR: Baboeomma) is a 2012 South Korean weekend television series starring Kim Hyun-joo, Ha Hee-ra, Ahn Seo-hyun, Kim Jeong-hoon, Kim Tae-woo, Shin Hyun-joon, Yoo In-young and Gong Hyun-joo . It aired on SBS from March 17 to May 20, 2012, on Saturdays and Sundays at 21:50 for 20 episodes.

The show is based on a novel of the same name by Choi Yoo-kyung, which was published on October 28, 2005.

== Plot ==
Kim Young-joo is a genius with an IQ of 200 and the youngest editor of a fashion magazine. Constantly embarrassed and ashamed of her sister's developmental disability and suffocated by her affection, Young-joo leaves home and runs away to get married. But after she gives birth to her own daughter and becomes a mother herself, Young-joo begins to see her life and family differently.

== Cast ==
=== Main ===
- Kim Hyun-joo as Kim Young-joo
  - Jo Min-ah as young Kim Young-joo
- Ha Hee-ra as Kim Sun-young
  - Jo Jung-eun as young Kim Sun-young
- Ahn Seo-hyun as Park Dat-byul
- Kim Jeong-hoon as Lee Je-ha
- Kim Tae-woo as Park Jung-do
- Shin Hyun-joon as Choi Go-man
- Yoo In-young as Oh Chae-rin
- Gong Hyun-joo as Han Soo-in

=== Supporting ===
- Park Hyung-sik as Oh Soo-hyun
- Kim Ha-kyun as Oh Min-suk
- Kim Chung as Jang Young-sook
- Sa Hee as Park Jung-eun
- Jo Duk-hyun as Butler Kim
- Lee Joo-shil as Seo Gob-dan
- Seo Dong-won as Bae Il-do
- Baek Bo-ram as Hong Yi-rim
- Lee Se-na as Kim Soo-ri
- Park Chul-min as Kim Dae-young
- Jung Hoon as Jin Tae-oh
- Lee Eun-jung as Jo Sun-hee
- Park Jae-rom as Na Jae-won
- Chun Jae-ho as Robert Oh
- Yang Eun-yong as Kang Hyun-joo
- Hong Seok-cheon as hairdresser (cameo)

== Episode ratings ==
Date	Episode #	TNmS Ratings (%)	
Date	Episode #	Nationwide	Seoul
March 17, 2012	1	11.4% (11th)	12.1% (8th)
March 18, 2012	2	10.3% (14th)	10.8% (14th)
March 24, 2012	3	10.9% (11th)	11.2% (13th)
March 25, 2012	4	10.8% (14th)	10.7% (15th)
March 31, 2012	5	14.0% (5th)	14.7% (4th)
April 1, 2012	6	11.8% (8th)	12.6% (8th)
April 7, 2012	7	11.4% (8th)	12.2% (7th)
April 8, 2012	8	10.7% (12th)	11.3% (12th)
April 14, 2012	9	11.5% (7th)	12.2% (6th)
April 15, 2012	10	10.4% (11th)	10.6% (10th)
April 21, 2012	11	13.3% (7th)	14.5% (8th)
April 22, 2012	12	12.2% (10th)	13.0% (9th)
April 28, 2012	13	10.7% (5th)	11.0% (6th)
April 29, 2012	14	10.2% (11th)	9.9% (12th)
May 5, 2012	15	12.2% (6th)	14.1% (4th)
May 6, 2012	16	11.9% (7th)	13.1% (5th)
May 12, 2012	17	11.4% (6th)	12.2% (6th)
May 13, 2012	18	12.2% (6th)	13.7% (5th)
May 19, 2012	19	11.2% (6th)	12.1% (5th)
May 20, 2012	20	12.6% (7th)	14.0% (5th)
Average		11.6%	12.3%

== Original soundtrack ==
No.	Title	Artist	Length
1.	"Dramatic (드라마틱)"	Kim Bo-kyung
2.	"Crying (울고도 남아서)"	Wax
3.	"When a Man Loves (남자가 사랑할때)"	Bohemian
4.	"You're the One (너란 사람)"	Page
5.	"Lullaby (자장가)"	Shin Hyo-bum
6.	"Common Person (흔한 사람)"	Kim Jeong-hoon
7.	"Dramatic (드라마틱) (Chorus Inst.)"	Various Artists
8.	"Crying (울고도 남아서) (Inst.)"	Various Artists
9.	"When a Man Loves (남자가 사랑할때) (Inst.)"	Various Artists
10.	"You're the One (너란 사람) (Inst.)"	Various Artists
11.	"Lullaby (자장가) (Inst.)"	Various Artists
12.	"Common Person (흔한 사람) (Chorus Inst.)"	Various Artists

== Awards and nominations ==
Year	Award	Category	Recipient	Result
2012	5th Korea Drama Awards	Top Excellence Award, Actress	Kim Hyun-joo	Nominated
2012	20th Korean Culture and Entertainment Awards	Excellence Award, Actress in a Drama	Yoo In-young	Won
2012	SBS Drama Awards	Top Excellence Award, Actor in a Weekend/Daily Drama	Shin Hyun-joon	Nominated
2012	SBS Drama Awards	Top Excellence Award, Actress in a Weekend/Daily Drama	Ha Hee-ra	Nominated
2012	SBS Drama Awards	Special Acting Award, Actress in a Weekend/Daily Drama	Yoo In-young	Nominated
