= Ahn Jae-hwan =

South Korean actor (1972–2008)

- Born: Ahn Gwang-seong; June 8, 1972; Goesan County, South Korea
- Died: c. August 2008 (aged 36); Seoul, South Korea
- Cause of death: Suicide by carbon monoxide poisoning
- Occupations: Actor; singer
- Years active: 1995–2008
- Spouse: Jung Seon-hee (m. 2007)

Korean name
- Hangul: 안광성
- RR: An Gwangseong
- MR: An Kwangsŏng

Stage name
- Hangul: 안재환
- RR: An Jaehwan
- MR: An Chaehwan

Ahn Jae-hwan (Korean: 안재환, June 8, 1972 – c. August 22, 2008) was a South Korean actor.

On September 8, 2008, Ahn Jae-hwan was found dead in his car at the age of 36, but the exact time of his death has not been revealed; police confirmed that he had died 10–15 days prior as his body was already decaying. It is considered to be a case of suicide by carbon monoxide poisoning.

== Filmography ==
- Beautiful Temptation (2004)
- Show Show Show (2003)
- Honest Living (2002)
- Cha Ki-bum (2001)
- Outing (2001)
- Mother and Sisters (2000)
- She's The One (2000)
- The Record (2000)
- You're One of A Kind (1999)
- Myth of a Hero (1997)
- Medical Brothers (1997)
- LA Arirang (1995)
