= A Man Called God =

- Promotional poster for A Man Called God
- Also known as: The Man Almighty
- Genre: Action; Romance
- Written by: Lee Hong-gu
- Directed by: Lee Hyung-sun
- Starring: Song Il-kook; Han Chae-young; Kim Min-jong; Han Go-eun; Yoo In-young
- Country of origin: South Korea
- Original language: Korean
- No. of episodes: 24

Production
- Executive producers: Choi Lee-seop (MBC); Kim Jin-man
- Producers: Kang Hoon Lee, Donghyun Kim, Byunghyup Kim, Seokhoon Kim
- Production locations: South Korea; Hawaii
- Running time: 60 minutes
- Production companies: Plan B Pictures; Modoo Productions; Midas Pictures; J&J International

Original release
- Network: MBC
- Release: March 6 – May 23, 2010

A Man Called God (Korean: 신이라 불리운 사나이; RR: Sinira bulliun sanai; also known as The Man Almighty) is a 2010 South Korean television series starring Song Il-kook, Han Chae-young, Kim Min-jong, Han Go-eun and Yoo In-young. It aired on MBC from March 6 to May 23, 2010 on Saturdays and Sundays at 21:45 for 24 episodes.

The ₩10 billion-budget action romance series is based on the 1999 comic book of the same title by manhwa writer Park Bong-seong.

== Plot ==
Choi Kang-ta is a super agent with a feared reputation who gains powers similar to a god. As a child, he lost his parents and was adopted by an American couple. After becoming an adult, he returns to Korea to exact revenge on the murderer of his father. He learns that there were four people responsible for his father's death. In the midst of carrying out his plans, his partner Vivian betrays him, putting his life in danger. He is nursed back to health by Bo-bae, a reporter he met by chance, and as he falls in love with her, his beliefs are shaken. After recovering from his wounds, he settles down in a slum neighborhood where he befriends the poor residents. For the first time in his life, he is surrounded by warmth and love in his new home, and finds peace within himself. But Hwang Woo-hyun, a high-ranking official at the Korean Central Intelligence Agency and heir to the Hwanglim Group empire, becomes enraged with jealousy that Choi Kang-ta stole Bo-bae away from him and decides to have him eliminated.

== Cast ==
- Song Il-kook as Michael King / Choi Kang-ta
  - Nam Da-reum as young Kang-ta
- Han Chae-young as Jin Bo-bae
- Kim Min-jong as Hwang Woo-hyun
- Han Go-eun as Vivian Castle
- Yoo In-young as Jang-mi
- Cho Jin-woong as Jang-ho
- Choo Ja-hyun as Seo Mi-soo / Choi Kang-Hee
- Jung Han-yong as Jang Yong
- Lee Jae-yong as Hwang Dal-soo
- Jung Dong-hwan as Lee Hyeong-seob
- Kim Yong-gun as Kang Tae-ho
- Lee Won-jong as Park Hong-choon
- Shin Beom-do as Dennis
- Lee Bo-hee as Han Soo-ra
- Kim Min-ji as Hye-jung
- Baek Il-seob as Hye-jung's grandfather
- Maeng Sang-hoon as Seo Tae-jin
- Kim Myung-gook
- Lee Jung-hoon as Choi Hae-ryong, Kang-ta's father
- Lee Jae-yoon as Park Chul
- Yoon Gi-won as Director Kim Ji-won
- Kim Hyo-jin as police woman
- Samuel Kang as NIS agent
- Lee Seung-hyung as Secretary Pyo
- Shin Seung-hwan
- Jung Dong-jin
- Lee Won-seok
- Yoon Beom
- Jung Eun-woo as Son Chul
- Lee Eun-bin
- Pascal Dior as Pascal The Assassin

== Ratings ==
Date	Episode	Nationwide	Seoul
2010-03-06	1	16.3% (6th)	16.6% (6th)
2010-03-07	2	15.0% (6th)	16.1% (6th)
2010-03-13	3	13.1% (8th)	14.3% (6th)
2010-03-14	4	11.9% (8th)	12.4% (7th)
2010-03-20	5	15.7% (5th)	16.5% (5th)
2010-03-21	6	13.5% (7th)	13.7% (6th)
2010-03-27	7	15.1% (6th)	16.5% (5th)
2010-03-28	8	14.5% (8th)	15.2% (8th)
2010-04-03	9	12.6% (7th)	12.6% (6th)
2010-04-04	10	14.1% (7th)	15.2% (6th)
2010-04-10	11	14.3% (6th)	14.6% (5th)
2010-04-11	12	13.9% (7th)	14.3% (7th)
2010-04-17	13	13.7% (4th)	14.3% (4th)
2010-04-18	14	15.2% (5th)	15.7% (4th)
2010-04-24	15	14.3% (6th)	14.9% (6th)
2010-04-25	16	16.4% (4th)	17.1% (4th)
2010-05-01	17	14.4% (4th)	15.1% (4th)
2010-05-02	18	15.2% (5th)	15.7% (5th)
2010-05-08	19	14.4% (4th)	14.8% (8th)
2010-05-09	20	15.6% (6th)	16.1% (6th)
2010-05-15	21	12.5% (4th)	12.9% (4th)
2010-05-16	22	15.2% (6th)	15.5% (6th)
2010-05-22	23	13.9% (7th)	13.6% (7th)
2010-05-23	24	17.0% (5th)	17.6% (5th)
average		14.5%	15.1%

Source: TNS Media Korea

== Liancourt Rocks (Dokdo Islands) controversy ==
Originally set to premiere on August 21, 2012 on BS Nippon, the airing of A Man Called God was indefinitely delayed after the broadcaster feared public backlash, amid diplomatic tension and rising anti-Korean sentiment in Japan against Hallyu celebrities regarding the Korea-Japan territorial dispute over the Liancourt Rocks. Lead actor Song Il-gook had participated in a 220-kilometer patriotic relay swim to the Liancourt Rocks on August 15 to commemorate South Korea's Liberation Day, which marks the end of Japan's colonial rule in 1945.

== International Broadcasts ==
In Indonesia, the series was broadcast by Lejel Television Network during 2012–2013. In the United States, the series began airing in February 2015 on KFVE/Honolulu on Sunday afternoons.
