= Sassy Girl Chun-hyang =

South Korean television series

- Also known as: Delightful Girl Choon-hyang; Sassy Girl: Chun-hyang
- Hangul: 쾌걸 춘향
- Hanja: 快傑 春香
- Lit.: Delightful Girl Chun-hyang
- RR: Kwaegeol Chunhyang
- MR: K'waegŏl Ch'unhyang
- Written by: Hong Jung-eun; Hong Mi-ran
- Directed by: Jeon Ki-sang; Ji Byung-hyun
- Starring: Han Chae-young; Jae Hee; Uhm Tae-woong; Park Si-eun
- Country of origin: South Korea
- Original language: Korean
- No. of episodes: 17

Production
- Producer: Lee Deok-geon
- Cinematography: Lee Ja-seong

Original release
- Network: KBS2
- Release: January 3 – March 1, 2005

Sassy Girl Chun-hyang (Korean: 쾌걸 춘향) is a 2005 South Korean television series starring Han Chae-young in the title role, along with Jae Hee, Uhm Tae-woong and Park Si-eun. It aired on KBS2 from January 3 to March 1, 2005, on Mondays and Tuesdays at 21:55 time slot for 17 episodes.

A modern retelling of the classic Korean Chunhyangjeon ("Tale of Chunhyang"), the romantic comedy series was called "fusion-style" for, among others, mixing rap with pansori in the background music.

This is the first Korean drama written by Hong Jung-eun and Hong Mi-ran (collectively called the Hong sisters), and remains the highest-rated in their filmography, with a peak viewership rating of 32.2%.

== Synopsis ==
Lee Mong-ryong, son of a decorated chief of police, is transferred from Seoul to a high school in Namwon, North Jeolla Province, due to his constant fighting. He accidentally bumps into Sung Chun-hyang, shoots embarrassing photos of her and ends up swapping her cell phone with his. As a result, they are constantly in touch with each other and find out they attend the same school. Mong-ryong constantly bullies Chun-hyang and eventually makes her fall sick due to his prank. Feeling guilty, he visits her, only to mistakenly drink a whole bottle of wine, assuming it is juice. He later falls asleep on the only bed in the house, which is the one Chun-hyang is sleeping in. Thus, they spend the night with each other. Nothing sexual occurs, but thanks to their best friends, who knew what happened, the information is accidentally announced over the school intercom. In order to save their families' and the school's reputation, they are forced to marry each other. They eventually agree to marry each other after Mong-ryong's crush, Hong Chae-rin rejects him. After being dumped by her boyfriend, Chae-rin discovers Mong-ryong's marriage and tries to win him back out of jealousy. There is also the problem of Byun Hak-do, an extremely successful talent agency director who falls in love with Chun-hyang.

In order to help him get into the prestigious college Chae-rin is studying in, Chun-hyang helps Mong-ryong in his studies. They are both accepted, but after Chun-hyang's mother got cheated of a large sum of money, Chun-hyang was not able to attend college; however, she does not reveal this and lies to her in-laws, telling them she will meet them in Seoul, not revealing that her mother is actually on the run. When Mong-ryong finally does find Chun-hyang, he tries again and again to reveal his feelings for her, while unearthing her feelings for him by moving into her new location. When he finally confesses outright, she rejects him, claiming she never loved him, because of Chae-rin's harsh statement that Mong-ryong merely pities her and wished only to pay her back.

When the two finally do confess to each other, there is still one more problem. Byun Hak-do, being rich, handsome and successful, assumes he could have any woman in the world, but when Chun-hyang rejects him, he attempts to win her through blackmail. Several days before the real wedding between Mong-ryong and Chun-hyang, Mong-ryong witnesses a woman being sexually assaulted and attempts to save her. He chases the assailants but the woman was in on the scheme and immediately accuses him as the assailant when an actor employed by Byun arrives on the scene. Mong-ryong escapes but becomes a criminal on the run. Byun Hak-do carries an edited video of the security camera, putting Mong-ryong in a bad light, and threatens Chun-hyang that unless she goes to him, he will expose the video to the world. Chun-hyang agrees and so Mong-ryong is freed, but now, Chun-hyang pretends to want to divorce him immediately to keep her end of the bargain. When the divorce is complete, she goes to Byun and the two of them prepare to travel to Japan, but at the last minute, she runs off and hides from both Byun and Mong-ryong.

Several years pass and Mong-ryong is now a famous prosecutor, a district attorney in Seoul. Chun-hyang has been hiding in Busan and now owns an accessories factory. Byun has just returned from Japan and people assume that his "fiancée" is still there as well. At the wedding of Mong-ryong's and Chun-hyang's two best friends, Bang Ji-hyuk and Han Dan-hee, Chun-hyang sneaks in to drop off a present, and as she leaves, Byun sees her. In a rush to leave, she accidentally scrapes the car next to her, which is incidentally Mong-ryong's car. The two start a heated argument over the phone. Chun-hyang's assistant, Kim Dong-soo, ends up meeting Mong-ryong to pay for the damages to his car. Several crooks who have been trailing Mong-ryong assume Dong-soo is an informant and kidnap him. After Mong-ryong and the police rescue him, Dong-soo leaves with Chun-hyang. Mong-ryong is informed that the wedding picture from high school that Mong-ryong and Chun-hyang took was among the documents Dong-soo had. He suddenly realizes that Chun-hyang was Dong-soo's boss and was not with Byun all this time. He eventually finds Chun-hyang again who spurns him as she is still worried about Byun's threats.

In the meantime Mong-ryong starts investigating Byun's company. Byun's partner who has mafia ties tries to stop him from doing so by threatening to reveal the doctored video tape. Finally, Byun realizes that there are just some things in the world that he can't have, and finally releases the full unedited version of the tape so that everyone can see Mong-ryong's true intentions and allows Chun-hyang to go back to Mong-ryong. In a rage of having his plans ruined, the thug kidnaps Chun-hyang. With Byun's cooperation, Mong-ryong saves Chun-hyang and arrests the thugs.

Mong-ryong proposes to Chun-hyang again, and the two remarry and live happily ever after.

== Cast ==
- Han Chae-young as Sung Chun-hyang

Her father died when she was two years old. So because of financial straits, Chun-hyang has to hold several part-time jobs to make enough money to support herself and her mother in their small apartment. She delivers newspapers, cleans ponds and works as a photographer. She studies hard at school and achieves the status of the top student of the school, as well as the school beauty. Usually sweet, gentle and kind, but feisty when angered. One day, she meets Lee Mong-ryong, an irresponsible boy which she ends up getting in trouble with and being forced to marry. She eventually falls in love with him.

- Jae Hee as Lee Mong-ryong

Lee Mong-ryong is a tough but very simple-minded and hot-tempered guy. Although he is the son of the chief of police, he's always getting into trouble in school. With the help of Chun-hyang, he enrolls into a prestigious university, achieving both love and career success at the same time. He was in love with Chae-rin for a long time but Chae-rin turned him down for she treats him like a little brother. That's when he decided to marry and eventually falls completely to Chun hyang.

- Uhm Tae-woong as Byun Hak-do

In the folktale Tale of Chunhyang, Byun Hak-do was a corrupt magistrate, but in this drama, he is the CEO of a talent agency. Initially, he helps Chun-hyang whenever she gets into trouble, reminiscent of Daddy Long Legs. But he soon becomes dangerously obsessed with her.

- Park Si-eun as Hong Chae-rin

A few years older than Mong-ryong, Chae-rin was the Lees' neighbor and family friend in Seoul. She is also Mong-ryong's first love. An opportunistic character, she knows that Mong-ryong likes her, but keeps leading him on then ignoring him. But when Mong-ryong gets married, Chae-rin begins to feel jealous, and eventually tries to win him back. She interferes with the relationship between Mong-ryong and Chun-hyang, persistently trying to make them break up.

- Lee In-hye as Han Dan-hee

Dan-hee is Chun-hyang's best friend, and dreams of becoming a successful actress.

- Moon Ji-yoon as Bang Ji-hyuk

Mong-ryong's best friend in Namwon, who is in love with Dan-hee.

- Kim Chung as Gong Wol-mae

Chun-hyang's mother, and a cabaret singer. She loves her daughter, but hates Chun-hyang's nagging.

- Ahn Suk-hwan as Mong-ryong's father

Mong-ryong's father, and the chief of police in Namwon. He believes that Chun-hyang can change his son from being a hot-tempered slacker into an intelligent and responsible man. He approves of Chun-hyang as his daughter-in-law, and become a caring father figure to her.

- Choi Ran as Mong-ryong's mother

Mong-ryong's mother, who is very protective of her son. Unlike her husband, she disapproves of Mong-ryong and Chun-hyang's marriage, and prefers Chae-rin to be her daughter-in-law. She often gives Chun-hyang a hard time in their house.

- Joo Ho as Kim Dong-soo

Chun-hyang's loyal assistant at her accessories factory.

- Lee Han-wi as high school teacher
- Hong Ji-young as Mi-san
- Son Il-kwon as Kang-min
- Lee Ji-hoon (Note: Credited as Lee Gun) as Director Baek

Byun Hak-do's subordinate.

- Yoon Yong-hyun as events company president
- Park Si-hoo as Chae-rin's boyfriend (bit part, ep 1-2)
- Park Hyo-min as Chun-hyang and Moon-ryong's high school junior (Cameo)

== Awards ==
2005 KBS Drama Awards

- Excellence Award, Actor: Uhm Tae-woong
- Best Supporting Actor: Ahn Suk-hwan
- Best New Actor: Jae Hee
- Popularity Award: Han Chae-young
- Best Couple Award: Jae Hee and Han Chae-young

== Ratings ==
| Date | Episode | Nationwide | Seoul |
|---|---|---|---|
| 2005-01-03 | 1 | 14.4% (11th) | 14.8% (11th) |
| 2005-01-04 | 2 | 14.1% (12th) | 14.1% (13th) |
| 2005-01-10 | 3 | 18.2% (8th) | 18.8% (7th) |
| 2005-01-11 | 4 | 17.3% (11th) | 17.4% (11th) |
| 2005-01-17 | 5 | 23.6% (2nd) | 24.9% (2nd) |
| 2005-01-18 | 6 | 25.9% (2nd) | 27.1% (1st) |
| 2005-01-24 | 7 | 26.2% (2nd) | 26.7% (2nd) |
| 2005-01-25 | 8 | 25.9% (1st) | 26.9% (1st) |
| 2005-01-31 | 9 | 29.1% (1st) | 29.9% (1st) |
| 2005-02-01 | 10 | 26.4% (1st) | 26.0% (1st) |
| 2005-02-07 | 11 | 22.0% (3rd) | 20.5% (4th) |
| 2005-02-14 | 12 | 25.1% (1st) | 24.2% (1st) |
| 2005-02-15 | 13 | 25.9% (1st) | 26.3% (1st) |
| 2005-02-21 | 14 | 26.4% (1st) | 25.9% (1st) |
| 2005-02-22 | 15 | 30.1% (1st) | 29.4% (1st) |
| 2005-02-28 | 16 | 30.7% (1st) | 30.2% (1st) |
| 2005-03-01 | 17 | 32.2% (1st) | 32.1% (1st) |
| Average | | 24.3% | 24.4% |

Source: TNS Media Korea
