= Seok Ju-seon =

Korean scholar and folklorist

- Born: September 17, 1911; Pyongyang
- Died: March 3, 1996 (aged 84); Cheonan
- Relatives: Seok Joo-myung (brother)

Korean name
- Hangul: 석주선
- Hanja: 石宙善
- RR: Seok Juseon
- MR: Sŏk Chusŏn

Seok Ju-seon (variously Seok Juseon or Suk Ju Seon; September 17, 1911 – March 3, 1996) was a scholar of traditional Korean clothing and a folklorist. Her works include The History of Korean Dresses and Ornaments.

Ju-seon donated over 3,300 items to the museum named for her at Dankook University, so it could curate and conserve Korean historical costume. The Seok Juseon Memorial Folk Museum was established in 1981, and combined with the Central Museum in 1999 to form the Seok Juseon Memorial Museum. Pieces from the collection were included in the first full-scale survey on art from the Joseon dynasty to be shown in the United States, Treasures from Korea: Arts and Culture of the Joseon Dynasty, 1392-1910.

Among the pieces Seok Ju-seon collected were cotton fabrics hand-woven according to traditional methods by Kim Man-ae of the village of Saetgol in Naju, South Jeolla province. Kim Man-ae was named a Living Human Treasure in 1969 for her weaving skills and her generous contributions to Seok Ju-seon's research.
