= Art of Fighting (film) =

- Theatrical release poster
- Directed by: Shin Han-sol
- Written by: Shin Han-sol; Min Dong-hyun
- Produced by: Lee Seo-yeol
- Starring: Baek Yoon-sik; Jae Hee
- Cinematography: Im Jae-soo
- Edited by: Moon In-dae
- Music by: Yoon Min-hwa
- Distributed by: CJ Entertainment
- Release date: 5 January 2006
- Running time: 95 minutes
- Country: South Korea
- Language: Korean
- Box office: US$7,489,032

Art of Fighting (Korean: 싸움의 기술; RR: Ssaumui gisul) is a 2006 South Korean action comedy drama film co-written and directed by Shin Han-sol. The film was released to Korean theaters on January 5, 2006, and had 1,313,727 tickets nationwide.

== Synopsis ==
Song Byeong-tae is bullied all the time in the small technical school he attends, until one day, he encounters and befriends Oh Pan-su, an old gangster-like man who hides in plain sight from the law, and whose fighting skills astound Byeong-tae, who asks the man to teach him to fight. He soon learns the true meaning and virtues of fighting as he finally goes against these bullies one by one and then after the toughest bully in the school, using the skills the man, whose name he does not even know, has taught him. Byeong-tae's father, on the other hand, is a distant police officer who suddenly starts taking a closer look at his son's new friend, eventually bringing consequences for everyone involved.

== Cast ==
- Baek Yoon-sik as Oh Pan-su
- Jae Hee as Song Byeong-tae
- Kim Eung-soo as Byeong-ho / Byeong-ho's father
- Choi Yeo-jin as Young-ae
- Park Won-sang as Section chief Ahn
- Hong Seung-jin as Pako
- Park Ki-woong as Jae-hoon
- Jeon Jae-hyung as Boong-eo
- Kwon Byung-gil as Assi
- Son Byeong-wook as Yong-ho
- Kim Young-hoon as "White Shark"
- Jo Sung-ha
