= Star's Echo =

- Poster
- Genre: Romance
- Written by: Kim Yoon-jung
- Directed by: Kim Nam-won
- Starring: Jo Hyun-jae; Noriko Nakagoshi; Lee Da-hae; Lee Joon-gi; Tomoka Kurotani
- Country of origin: South Korea
- Original languages: Korean; Japanese
- No. of episodes: 2

Production
- Executive producer: Nakajima Kumiko Kim Nam-won
- Producer: Nakajima Kumiko Yeo In-joon
- Production locations: South Korea; Japan
- Running time: 60 minutes

Original release
- Network: MBC; Fuji TV
- Release: January 30, 2004

Star's Echo (Korean: 별의 소리; RR: Byeorui sori), also known as Anata ni Aitakute (Japanese: あなたに逢いたくて), is a 2-part mini-series broadcast by MBC and Fuji TV in 2004. It is the third collaboration by South Korean and Japanese television companies, after Friends in 2001 and Passing Rain in 2002.

== Synopsis ==
The story is centered on the love between a musically gifted South Korean man, Sung-jae (Jo Hyun-jae), and a Japanese woman, Misaki (Nakagoshi Noriko). Misaki, who feels guilty over her boyfriend's death, is transferred to Korean and meets Sung-jae who helps her cure her wounds of the past memories with love.

== Cast ==
- Jo Hyun-jae as Sung-jae
- Noriko Nakagoshi as Misaki
- Lee Da-hae as Ji-young
- Tanihara Shosuke as Suji
- Tomoka Kurotani as Tomoko
- Lee Joon-gi as Chan-gyu
- Kim Yong-hee as Min-suk

== Production credits ==
MBC Staff

- Chief Producer: Kim Nam-won (김남원)
- Director: Kim Nam-won (김남원), Go Dong-sun (고동선)
- Producer: Yeo In-joon (여인준)

Fuji TV Staff

- Chief Producer: Honma Ohiko (本間欧彦)
- Director: Kobayashi Kazuhiro
- Producer: Nakajima Kumiko (中島久美子)
