= Jae Hee =

South Korean actor

- Born: Lee Hyun-kyun; May 25, 1980 (age 46); Seoul, South Korea
- Education: Dankook University - Theater and Film
- Occupation: Actor
- Years active: 1996–present
- Agents: Polaris Entertainment; Family Ent (2018–present)
- Spouse: Unknown (m. 2010)
- Children: 1 son (Lee Ra-on)

Korean name
- Hangul: 이현균
- Hanja: 李賢均
- RR: I Hyeongyun
- MR: I Hyŏn'gyun

Stage name
- Hangul: 재희
- Hanja: 在喜
- RR: Jaehui
- MR: Chaehŭi

Jae Hee (Korean: 재희; born Lee Hyun-kyun on May 25, 1980) is a South Korean actor. He is best known for his leading roles in the 2004 arthouse film 3-Iron and the 2005 television series Sassy Girl Chun-hyang.

== Career ==
Jae Hee began his acting career as a child actor in the 1997 drama Mountain. He continued to appear on television, such as in the campus drama School 2 and the family sitcom Wuri's Family, as well as the 2000 horror film Bloody Beach.

In 2004, he was cast as the lead actor in Kim Ki-duk's 3-Iron, playing a silent young man who breaks into vacant houses and while living there for a few days, he cleans the house and repairs broken gadgets during his stay. The arthouse film won critical acclaim both locally and internationally. For his performance Jae Hee was named Best New Actor at the Blue Dragon Film Awards.

But Jae Hee's breakout role would come in 2005, when he played the playful but loyal Lee Mong-ryong in Sassy Girl Chun-hyang, a modernized romantic comedy based on the well-known folktale Chunhyangjeon. It became a huge hit not only in Korea, but throughout Asia, making him and co-star Han Chae-young into Korean Wave stars.

He followed that with action comedy film The Art of Fighting in 2006, in which he played a bullied high school kid who learns about martial arts and life from a wizened mentor (played by veteran actor Baek Yoon-sik).

Jae Hee returned to television, playing a chef in 2007's Witch Yoo Hee (in which he reunited with Chun-hyang director Jeon Ki-sang), and a surrogate father in 2008's One Mom and Three Dads, but those series were less successful ratings-wise.

On August 5, 2008, he enlisted for mandatory military service. He was assigned to the Defense Media Agency until his discharge on June 18, 2010.

For his first post-army project, Jae Hee was initially cast in Bravo, My Love!, but had to drop out after he sustained a back injury during windsurfing practice for the role. Instead, he starred as the chaebol heir of a cosmetics firm in cable romantic comedy Color of Woman, which aired on Channel A in 2011.

Jae Hee played the antagonist in May Queen, a 2012 generational epic set against the backdrop of the shipbuilding industry in Ulsan during Korea's modernization. He received an Excellence Award from the MBC Drama Awards.

In 2013, he joined period drama Jang Ok-jung, Living by Love, a revisionist take on the titular Jang, more infamously known as the royal concubine Jang Hui-bin. Initially cast as Jang Ok-jung's first love, his screen time was drastically reduced. Later that year, his Chinese film Crimes of Passion received a theater release three years after Jae Hee shot it in 2010.

== Other activities ==
Jae Hee is currently running an online apparel shopping mall called Easy by Step, which he established in May 2007.

== Personal life ==
After an article appeared in the South Korean magazine Woman Sense that the presumed bachelor actor was leading a secret life, Jae Hee confirmed on October 23, 2012, that he had been married to a non-celebrity since 2010, and that he and his wife have a son. He said he did not reveal his marital status not because he was ashamed or hiding his family (the marriage and his son's birth were officially registered at the borough office), but because he wanted to be "private" and "protect his loved-ones."

== Filmography ==
=== Television series ===
Year	Title	Role	Network
1997	Mountain		MBC
1998	I Love You! I Love You!	Lee Joo-beom	SBS
1998	Steal My Heart	Choi Kwan-woo	SBS
1998	New Generation Report: Adults Don't Know		KBS1
1998	Soonpoong Clinic	Pizza delivery man (episodes 184, 367)	SBS
1999	School 2	Lee Sung-je	KBS2
2000	Golbangi		SBS
2000	Medical Center	AIDS patient (guest, episode 5)	SBS
2001	Wuri's Family	Gyeo-re	MBC
2002	To Be with You	Lee Sang-won	KBS1
2005	Sassy Girl Chun-hyang	Lee Mong-ryong	KBS2
2006	My Girl	Lee Mong-ryong (cameo, episode 16)	SBS
2007	Witch Yoo Hee	Chae Moo-ryong	SBS
2008	One Mom and Three Dads	Choi Kwang-hee	KBS2
2008	Oh Goo the Exorcism	Yoon Ki-joo	KBS2
2008	Chase! X-boyfriend		Mnet
2011	Color of Woman	Yoon Joon-soo	Channel A
2012	May Queen	Park Chang-hee	MBC
2013	Jang Ok-jung, Living by Love	Hyun Chi-soo	SBS
2013	The Eldest	Park Soon-taek	JTBC
2015	Save the Family	Jung Woo-jin	KBS1
2016	The Vampire Detective	Han Gyu-min	OCN
2016	Goddess of Immortality	Movie Director	Naver
2017	You Are Too Much	Jo Sung-taek	MBC
2018	Voice	Son Ho-min (guest, season 2, episode 8–9)	OCN
2019	Blessing of the Sea	Ma Poong-do	MBC
2021	A Good Supper	Kyung-soo	MBC

=== Film ===
Year	Title	Role
1999	Ghost in Love	Jin Chae-byul's younger brother
2000	Bloody Beach	Won-il
2004	3-Iron	Tae-suk
2006	The Art of Fighting	Song Byeong-tae
2007	The Evil Twin	Hyun-sik
	Zig Zag Love	Sung-hyun
2008	Mandate	Choi Kang
2013	Crimes of Passion	Jeong-hee
2018	Folktale	Heung-boo
2018	Memento Mori	Min-soo
2020	Two Big Men	Resort Development Investment Entrepreneur

=== Television shows ===
Year	Title	Role	Ref.
2022	Empathy Documentary Shelter	Main Cast	

== Awards and nominations ==
Year	Award	Category	Nominated work	Result
2004	25th Blue Dragon Film Awards	Best New Actor	3-Iron	Won
2005	KBS Drama Awards	Best New Actor	Sassy Girl Chun-hyang	Won
2005	KBS Drama Awards	Best Couple Award with Han Chae-young	Sassy Girl Chun-hyang	Won
2006	41st Baeksang Arts Awards	Best New Actor (TV)	Sassy Girl Chun-hyang	Nominated
2006	41st Baeksang Arts Awards	Best New Actor (Film)	3-Iron	Nominated
2009	The Army Chief of Staff Award	—N/a	—N/a	Won
2012	MBC Drama Awards	Excellence Award, Actor in a Serial Drama	May Queen	Won
2015	4th APAN Star Awards	Excellence Award, Actor in a Serial Drama	Save the Family	Nominated
2015	KBS Drama Awards	Excellence Award, Actor in a Daily Drama	Save the Family	Nominated
2016	2nd KWebFest	Best Actor	Goddess of Immortality	Nominated
2018	4th SeoulWebFest	Best Actor	Memento Mori	Won
2019	MBC Drama Awards	Top Excellence Award, Actor in a Weekend/Daily Drama	Blessing of the Sea	Nominated
2021	2021 MBC Drama Awards	Top Excellence Award, Actor in a Daily Drama	A Good Supper	Nominated
