= Dankook University =

Private university in Yongin and Cheonan, South Korea

Coordinates: 37°19′19″N 127°7′34″E

- 단국대학교 (檀國大學校)
- Motto: 자립·자주·구국
- Motto in English: Self-reliance; Independence; National salvation
- Type: Private university
- Established: November 3, 1947
- President: An Soon-cheol (안순철)
- Undergraduates: 33,588
- Postgraduates: 4,564
- Location: Jukjeon Campus: Yongin, Gyeonggi Province, South Korea; Cheonan Campus: Cheonan, South Chungcheong Province, South Korea
- Campus: Urban
- Colors: Blue
- Mascot: Bear
- Website: dankook.ac.kr

- Dankook University
- Hangul: 단국대학교
- Hanja: 檀國大學校
- RR: Danguk daehakgyo
- MR: Tan'guk taehakkyo

Dankook University (commonly referred to as Dankook), abbreviated as DKU, is a private research university in Yongin and Cheonan, South Korea. The university was established in 1947. It was the first university established after the National Liberation Day of Korea, and its original location was in Jongno District and Yongsan District (after Jongno), Seoul.

== Academics ==
Dankook University has a global affiliate network of universities and institutes.

- Study abroad programs at sister universities allow students to improve their language skills. Dankook University gives financial support and several academic credits.
- Short-term visiting programs provide faculty, staff and students with opportunities to expose themselves to global standards.
- International summer/winter schools are designed to welcome students from sister universities and non-affiliated institutions.
- Global Talent Network is a student organization that consists of Korean and international students. It seeks to promote mutual cooperation.

There is an extension campus in Cheonan, a city in South Chungcheong Province. The Cheonan campus includes the largest hospital in the region and one of Korea's top dental programs, as well as the only four-year Mongolian Language and Literature Department in Korea.

The university hosts more than 30,000 students and employs an instructional faculty of about 2,700 professors and teachers.

== Global Dankook and mascot ==
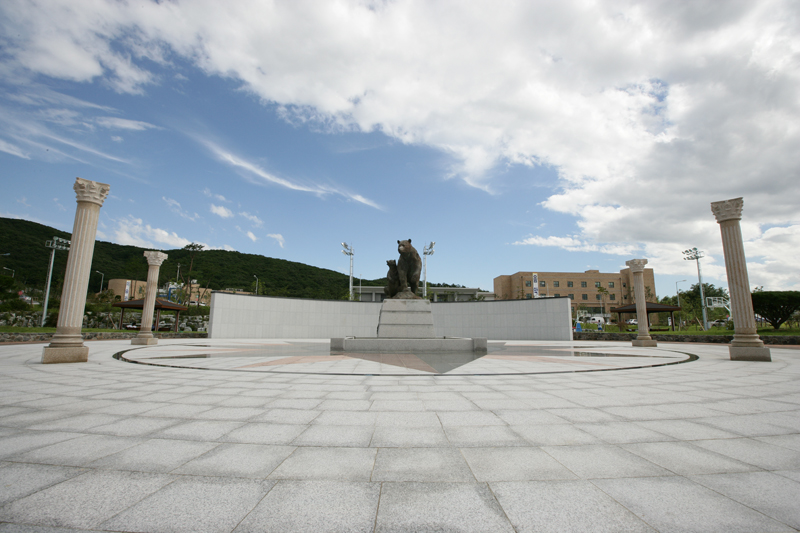
Jukjeon Campus has a bronze bear statue, Yongin

Dankook University's mascot is the bear. Each campus has a bronze bear statue.

As mentioned above, Dankook University was the first private university established after Korea gained independence in 1947. The university now features 20 undergraduate colleges and 10 professional graduate schools divided between its new Jukjeon campus, constructed in 2007, and its Cheonan campus.

Both campuses have international exchange programs and are home to foreign students and faculty from countries such as the United States, China and the United Kingdom.

The international presence at Dankook continues to grow thanks to its collaborative relationships with more than 90 universities from 30 countries, including Stockholm University in Sweden; California State University and Ohio Northern University in the USA; and La Trobe University in Australia. These relationships have fostered international summer schools programs, student exchanges, and short-term visits.

== History ==
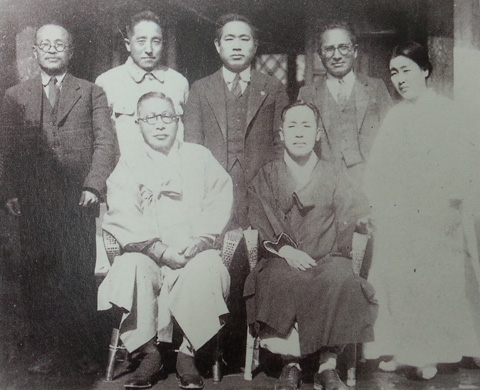
Established at Dankook University (3 November 1947), Seoul Jongro Nakwon 282 Street

The foundation of Dankook University was approved on November 1, 1947, its opening taking place at Nakwon-dong, Jongno District, Seoul, on November 3. In 1967 the Seok Juseon museum opened based on a donation of over 3,000 items by Seok Ju-Seon. The museum curates and conserves Korean costumes.

== Academics ==
The university holds international symposiums, publishes academic journals, and manages 22 research bodies such as the Oriental Study Research Institute, the Information Display Research Institute, the Buried Cultural Property Research Institute, the Special Education Research Institute, the Medical Laser Research Institute etc. It has 20 affiliates and affiliated education organizations such as the Seokjuseon Museum and the Information and Communication Center.

University rankings

Global – Overall
- QS World: 1001-1200 (2026)

Regional – Overall
- QS Asia: =339 (2025)

DKU was selected as the best institute in 10 fields for the general university evaluations of 1999. It is ranked #751-800 in QS World University Rankings 2023. Dankook generally accepts students with a CSAT(College Scholastic Ability Test) score in the top 10% of the nation.

=== Jukjeon Campus ===
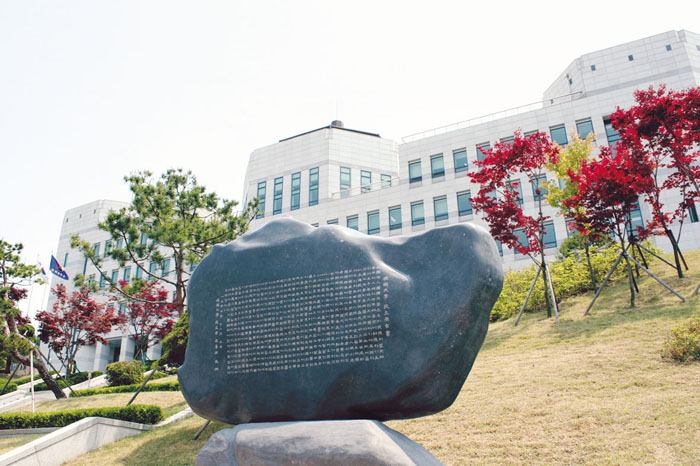
Prospectus in front of the main building Beomjeonggwan, Jukjeon

- College of Humanities
- College of Law
- College of Liberal Arts
- College of Music and Arts
- College of Social Science
- College of Business & Economics
- College of Engineering
- College of Software Convergence
- College of Education

=== Cheonan Campus ===
- College of Foreign Languages
- College of Science & Technology
- College of Biotechnology & Bioenginerring
- College of Arts
- College of Sports Science
- College of Medicine
- College of Health & Welfare
- College of Nursing
- College of Dentistry

The graduate schools were opened in 1958. Twelve graduate schools are managed in 65 departments for the master's course and 51 departments for the doctor's course and the Business Graduate School, the Juridical Affairs and Administration Graduate School, the Education Graduate School, the Design Graduate School, the Information and Communication Graduate School, the Special Education Graduate School, the Mass Culture and Art Graduate School, the TESOL Graduate School, the Real EstateㆍConstruction Graduate School, and the Policy Management Graduate School, the Sports Science Graduate School and the Health and Welfare Graduate School, on Jukjeon Campus.

== Notable alumni ==
- Ahn Suk-hwan
- Bada (S.E.S)
- Cho Seung-woo
- Choi Yoon-young
- Choi Young-won (Apeace)
- Choo Ja-hyun
- Danny Ahn (g.o.d)
- Eru
- Go Se-won
- Ha Ji-won
- In Gyo-jin
- Jae Hee
- Jang Hyuk
- Jang Ki-bum
- Jay Park
- Daud Kim
- Ji Chang-wook
- Jo Hyun-jae
- Kim Da-hyun
- Kim Dong-ho
- Kim Hye-sun
- Kim Hyun-joo
- Kim Hyung-jun (SS501)
- Kim Ji-woo
- Kim Jong-kook (Turbo)
- Kim Joon-ho
- Kim Min-hee
- Kim Min-seo
- Kim Roi-ha
- Kim Ye-ryeong
- Kim Yoon-seo
- Kwak Si-yang
- Kwon Hyun-sang
- Lee Byung-joon
- Lee Byung-kyu
- Lee Chae-young
- Lee Eun-ju
- Lee Ha-na
- Lee Jong-won
- Lee Joon-hyuk
- Lee Ki-woo
- Lee Min-hyuk (BtoB)
- Lee Min-young
- Lee So-jung (Ladies' Code)
- Lee Yo-won
- Moon Hee-kyung
- Na In-woo
- Naul (Brown Eyed Soul)
- N (VIXX)
- Oh Hyun-kyung
- Seung-hwan Oh
- Oh Yeon-soo
- Ok Taec-yeon (2PM)
- Park Bo-young
- Park Hae-soo
- Park Jung-min (SS501)
- Park Tae-hwan
- Rain
- Shin Eun-kyung
- Shin Jae-ha
- Son Tae-jin
- T.O.P (Big Bang)
- Woo Do-hwan
- Yoo Ji-tae
- Yoo Yeon-jung (Cosmic Girls)
- Yoon Chan
- Yoon Yo-seop

== Dankook University Hospital ==
Dankook University Hospital (DKUH) opened in April 1994. It has a total of 2,023 employees. DKUH is the largest general hospital in South Chungcheong province, South Korea, with 878 certified beds and 33 specialty clinics including Internal medicine, Surgery, Ophthalmology, Otorhinolaryngology, Physical Medicine and Rehabilitation, and Radiology. The hospital has a regional trauma center designated by the ministry of health and welfare, treating seriously injured patients from all of South Chungcheong province and more. DKUH is active in medical research with Beckman Laser Institute Korea, Life Science Research Institute, Gastrointestinal Research Unit and Biotechnology Research Institute.

== See also ==
- List of colleges and universities in South Korea
- Education in South Korea
