= Han Chae-young =

South Korean actress (born 1980)

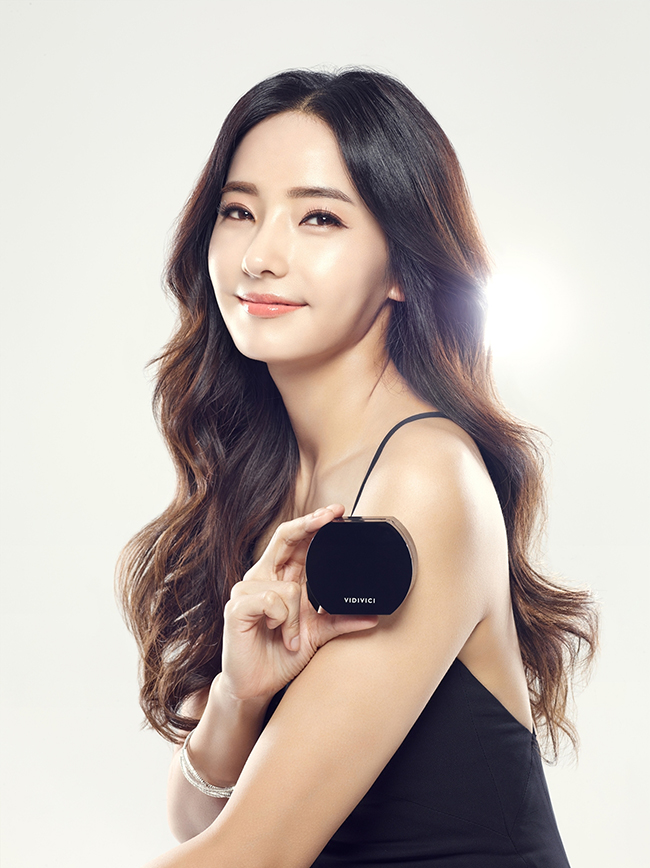
- Han in 2016
- Born: Kim Ji-young; September 13, 1980 (age 46); Daegu, South Korea
- Other name: Rachel Kim
- Education: Dongguk University
- Occupation: Actress
- Years active: 2000–present
- Agent: J-Flex Entertainment
- Spouse: Choi Dong-joon (m. 2007)
- Children: 1

Korean name
- Hangul: 김지영
- Hanja: 金志英
- RR: Gim Jiyeong
- MR: Kim Chiyŏng

Stage name
- Hangul: 한채영
- Hanja: 韓彩英
- RR: Han Chaeyeong
- MR: Han Ch'aeyŏng

Kim Ji-young (Korean: 김지영; born September 13, 1980), professionally known by the stage name Han Chae-young, is a South Korean actress. She first gained recognition as the antagonist in the television series Autumn in My Heart (2000) before gaining wider prominence as the titular character in Sassy Girl Chun-hyang (2005). Her other roles include Only You (2005), Fireworks (2006), Boys Over Flowers (2009), A Man Called God (2010), and Bel Ami (2013).

== Early life ==
Han Chae-young was born as Kim Ji-young in Daegu, South Korea, but her family soon immigrated to the United States and she spent her childhood years in a Chicago suburb, where she attended Glenbrook South High School. During one of her visits to Korea, she was reportedly discovered by a famed Korean comedian who suggested that she put her college plans on hold and try acting.

== Career ==
=== 2000–2004: Early career ===
Taking on the stage name Han Chae-young, she made her acting debut in 2000 with the horror film The Record. Her role as the antagonist in the popular television melodrama Autumn in My Heart gave her more exposure, though she was criticized for her awkward acting skills.

She later gained the nickname "Barbie Doll of Korea," a reference to her tall, shapely proportions. Though this image would land her numerous commercial endorsements, her acting projects in the next few years saw Han typecast as an unapproachable beauty from a wealthy background.

=== 2005–2008: Breakthrough ===
In 2005, Han achieved success with the South Korean romantic comedy television series Sassy Girl Chun-hyang, playing the titular role of a smart, lively high school girl who matured into a self-sufficient woman. A modern-day retelling of the famous folktale Chunhyangjeon, the series averaged 24.3% in viewership ratings, placing first in its slot for several episodes.

Her next two roles saw her playing a single mother with culinary dreams in the television series Only You (2005) and a jilted girl looking for employment in Exhibition of Fireworks (2006). Both series underperformed and she reverted to a glamorous character for the couple-swapping film Love Now (2007). In 2006, she signed an exclusive contract with BH Entertainment owned by Lee Byung-hun, and became one of the 1st talents of the newly found agency; BH Entertainment also manages many actors including Go Soo, Jin Goo, and Han Hyo-joo.

Han surprised fans by acting on stage for the first time in Jang Jin's play Clumsy People, which had a sell-out theater run from December 7, 2007, to March 2, 2008. Later that year she released her clothing line Rachel Han's (taken from her American name), produced in conjunction with online retailer G-Market.

=== 2009–2012: International debut ===
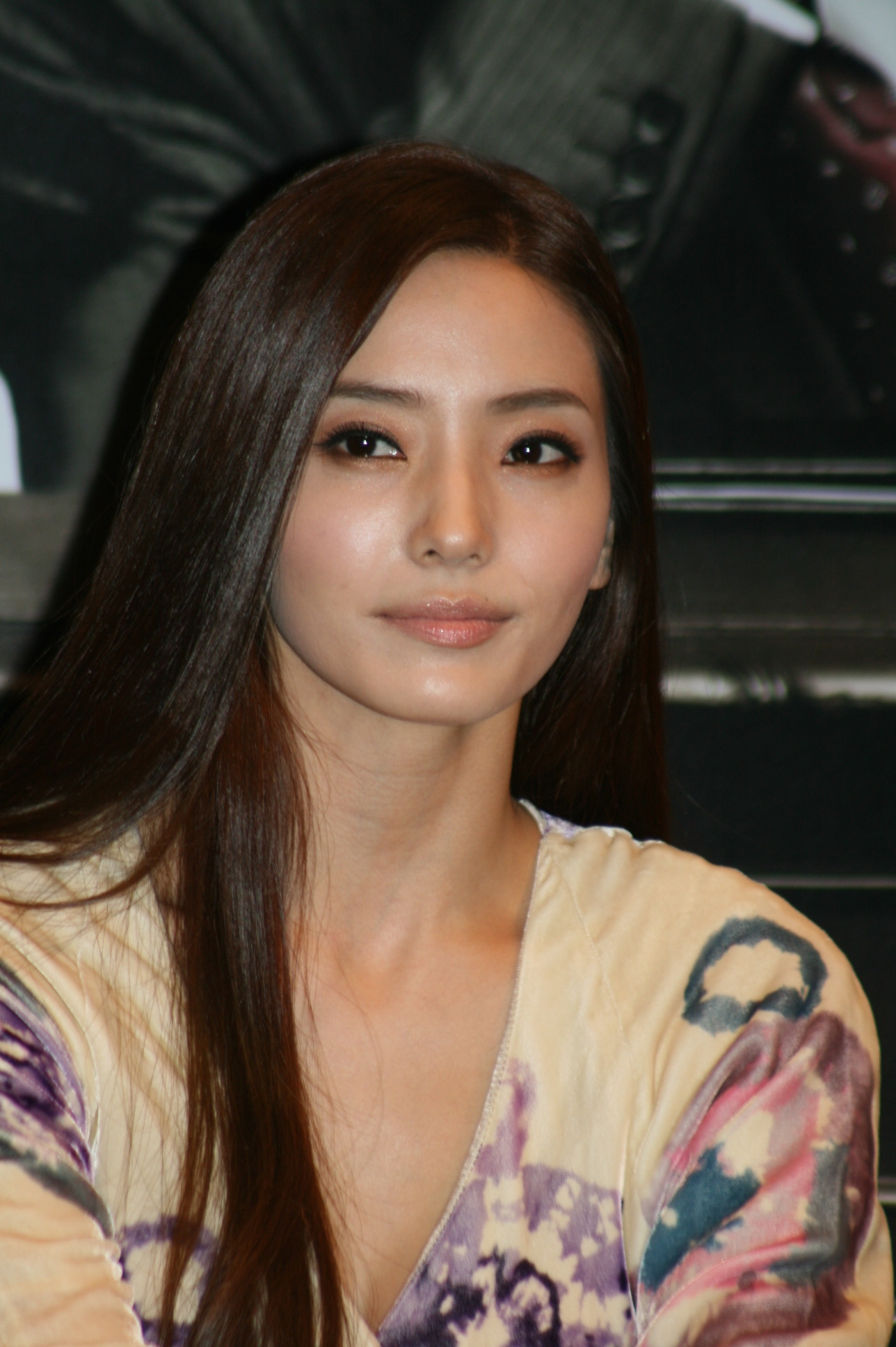
Han in 2009

In 2009 she made a special guest appearance in the smash hit drama Boys Over Flowers and starred in the films Good Morning President alongside Jang Dong-gun and Girlfriends. She later stated that her character in Girlfriend resembled her real self the most and was also the role she said she "had the most fun playing." The horror film Soul Mates, a Korea-New Zealand co-production, was supposed to have been Han's English-language international debut, but the project was later cancelled.

After a lengthy hiatus from the small screen (her 2009 fashion drama Magazine Allo did not push through due to plagiarism charges), Han was cast as a down-to-earth rookie journalist in 2010's manhwa adaptation A Man Called God. The ₩10 billion-budget action-romance series is based on the 1999 comic book of the same title by manhwa writer Park Bong-seong, and achieved higher than average ratings during its run.

She then played Lee Byung-hun's love interest in The Influence, an online mystery-fantasy movie about a love that transcends time and space. The English-speaking actress signed with agency Creative Artists Agency (CAA) that same year.

Considered a Korean Wave star due to the popularity of Sassy Girl Chun-hyang, Han began expanding her career to the mainland Chinese market. She starred in the 2011 fantasy-comedy A Big Deal opposite Blue Lan, Leon Jay Williams, and Chapman To. She was also cast in a leading role in Chinese television drama Wu Xie Ke Ji Zhi Lan Se Meng Xiang (lit. "Dream in Blue") opposite Zhu Zi Xiao, which aired on Zhejiang TV in 2012.

=== 2013–present ===
After being under BH Entertainment for six years, Han left after her contract expiration in 2013 and signed with SM C&C.

She returned to the small screen with the 2013 television series Ad Genius Lee Tae-baek, which is loosely based on internationally renowned advertising designer and social activist Jeseok Yi (a.k.a. Jeski), who wrote the 2010 book Ad Genius Lee Je-seok. The series also reunited Han with Jo Hyun-jae who previously worked together in the 2005 TV series Only You. Her next series was Bel Ami, playing the glamorous, successful woman that the main character (played by Jang Keun-suk) pines after. In 2015, Han began hosting her first variety show, Take Care of My Dressing Table, where professionals in the beauty industry such as makeup artists and hairdressers share their styling tips. But her career remained primarily in China, where Han filmed the web series Beauty Master, followed by the TV adaptation of the Chinese novel The Rebirth of a Celebrity Superstar.

Since 2017, she has been a cast member of KBS2's Sister's Slam Dunk, and made her singing debut as member of a temporary group called Unnies. In September 2017 Han returned to the big screen with the comedy film The Star Next Door, playing a star actress who has a teenage daughter (portrayed by Jin Ji-hee) that is kept a secret from the public.

In 2018, Han was cast in the MBC weekend drama A Promise with the Gods. This marks Han's first Korean drama appearance in four years.

In December 2022, Han signed with new agency J-Flex Entertainment.

In 2024, Han was cast in Snow White's Revenge, her first-ever regular appearance in a daily soap opera since she began acting in 2000. At the age of 43, she took on the role of the mother of an adult actor for the first time as she played the 54-year-old villain Moon Jeong-in.

== Personal life ==
Han married Korean-American businessman Choi Dong-joon on June 2, 2007, at Hotel Shilla in Seoul. She gave birth to a son on August 28, 2013.

== Filmography ==
=== Film ===
Year	Title	Role	Notes	Ref.
2000	The Record	Eun-mi		
2002	Bet on My Disco	Bong-ja		
2003	Wild Card	Kang Na-na		
2007	Love Now	So-yeo		
2009	Good Morning President	Kim Yi-yeon		
2009	Girlfriends	Jin		
2010	The Influence	J	Online film	
2011	A Big Deal	Zhou Yun	Chinese film	
2016	The Guest		Chinese film	
2017	The Star Next Door	Han Hye-mi		

=== Television series ===
Year	Title	Role	Notes	Ref.
2000	Autumn in My Heart	Choi/Yoon Shin-ae		
2002	Affection	Yoo Hae-mi		
2004	Beijing My Love	Jung Yeon-seok		
2005	Sassy Girl Chun-hyang	Sung Chun-hyang		
2005	Only You	Cha Eun-jae		
2006	My Girl	Choi Han-na	Cameo; Episode 16	
2006	Fireworks	Shin Na-ra		
2009	Boys Over Flowers	Min Seo-hyun		
2010	A Man Called God	Jin Bo-bae		
2010	Haru: An Unforgettable Day in Korea		Tourism mini-movie	
2012	Dream in Blue	Lin Wei Wei	Chinese television drama	
2013	Ad Genius Lee Tae-baek	Go Ah-ri		
2013	Bel Ami	Hong Yoo-ra		
2015	1931 Love Story	Shang Wanting	Chinese television drama	
2016	The Rebirth of a Celebrity Superstar		Chinese television drama	
2018	A Pledge to God	Seo Ji-young		
2022	Sponsor	Han Chae-rin		
2023	XO, Kitty	Dami	Guest role	
2024	Snow White's Revenge	Moon Jeong-in / Moon Gyeong-sook		

=== Television shows ===
Year	Title	Role	Notes	Ref.
2017	Sister's Slam Dunk	Regular cast		
2017–2018	Wizard of Nowhere	Cast member		
2018	Secret Unnie	Regular cast	With Yeri (Red Velvet)	
2019	Why Not?	Cast member	With Oh Ha-young & Song Hae-na	

== Theater ==
Theater play performances of Han
Year	Title		Role	Venue	Date	Ref.
Year	English	Korean	Role	Venue	Date	Ref.
2007–2008	Clumsy People	서툰 사람들 - 장진이 만든 코믹소란극	Yu Hwa-i	Dongsung Art Centre Small Theatre	Dec 7 to Mar 16	

== Awards and nominations ==
Year	Award	Category	Nominated work	Result
2005	KBS Drama Awards	Best Couple Award (with Jae Hee)	Sassy Girl Chun-hyang	Won
2005	KBS Drama Awards	Popularity Award, Actress	Sassy Girl Chun-hyang	Won
2007	Korea Best Dresser of the Year Awards	Recipient	—N/a	Won
2008	Asia Model Awards	Model Star Award	—N/a	Won
2008	Grand Bell Awards	Best New Actress	Love Now	Nominated
2009	Andre Kim Best Star Awards	Female Star Award	—N/a	Won
2010	Asia Model Awards	Model Star Award	—N/a	Won
2011	CETV Awards	Top 10 Asian Stars		Won
2011	Cosmopolitan Beauty Awards	2011's Most Stylish Actress	—N/a	Won
2011	China Trend Awards	Shining Artist	—N/a	Won
2011	TV Drama Awards Made in China	Best Online Popularity		Won
2017	MBC Entertainment Awards	Rookie Awards in Variety	Wizard of Nowhere	Won
2018	MBC Drama Awards	Top Excellence Award, Actress in a Weekend Special Project	A Pledge to God	Nominated
