= Yoo In-young =

South Korean actress (born 1984)

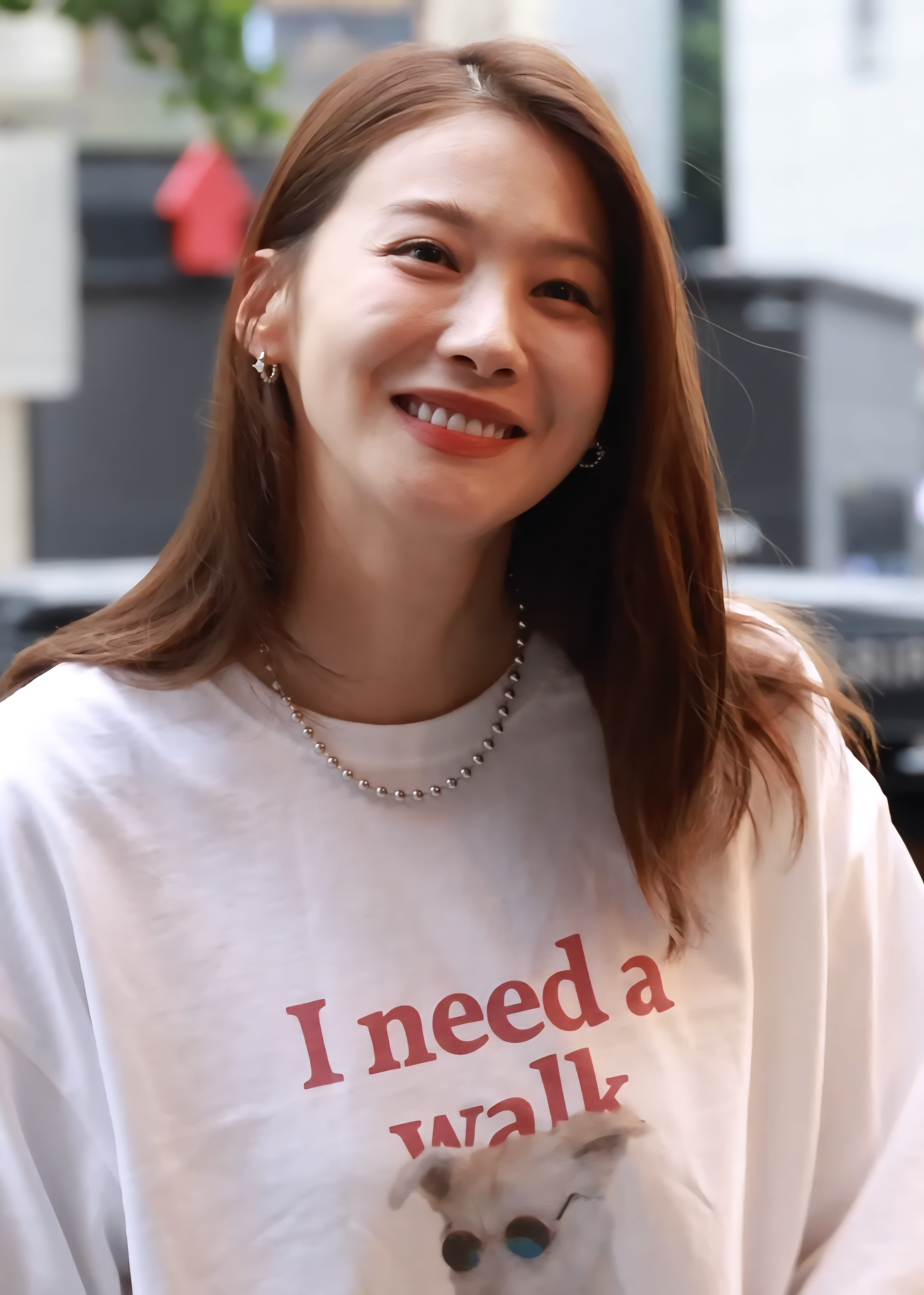
- Yoo in July 2025
- Born: Yoo Hyo-min; January 5, 1984 (age 42); South Korea
- Education: Chung-Ang University - Theater and Film Studies
- Occupation: Actress
- Years active: 2004–present
- Agent: YK Media Plus

Korean name
- Hangul: 유효민
- RR: Yu Hyomin
- MR: Yu Hyomin

Stage name
- Hangul: 유인영
- RR: Yu Inyeong
- MR: Yu Inyŏng
- Website: ykmediaplus.co.kr

Yoo Hyo-min (Korean: 유효민; born January 5, 1984), professionally known as Yoo In-young (유인영), is a South Korean actress. Yoo began her entertainment career as a commercial model before making her acting debut in 2005.

Yoo is best known for her roles in A Man Called God (2010) and Dummy Mommy (2012). In 2013, Yoo was chosen as a model for Elizabeth Arden, the first Korean actor to represent the cosmetic brand exclusively in the Asian region.

== Filmography ==
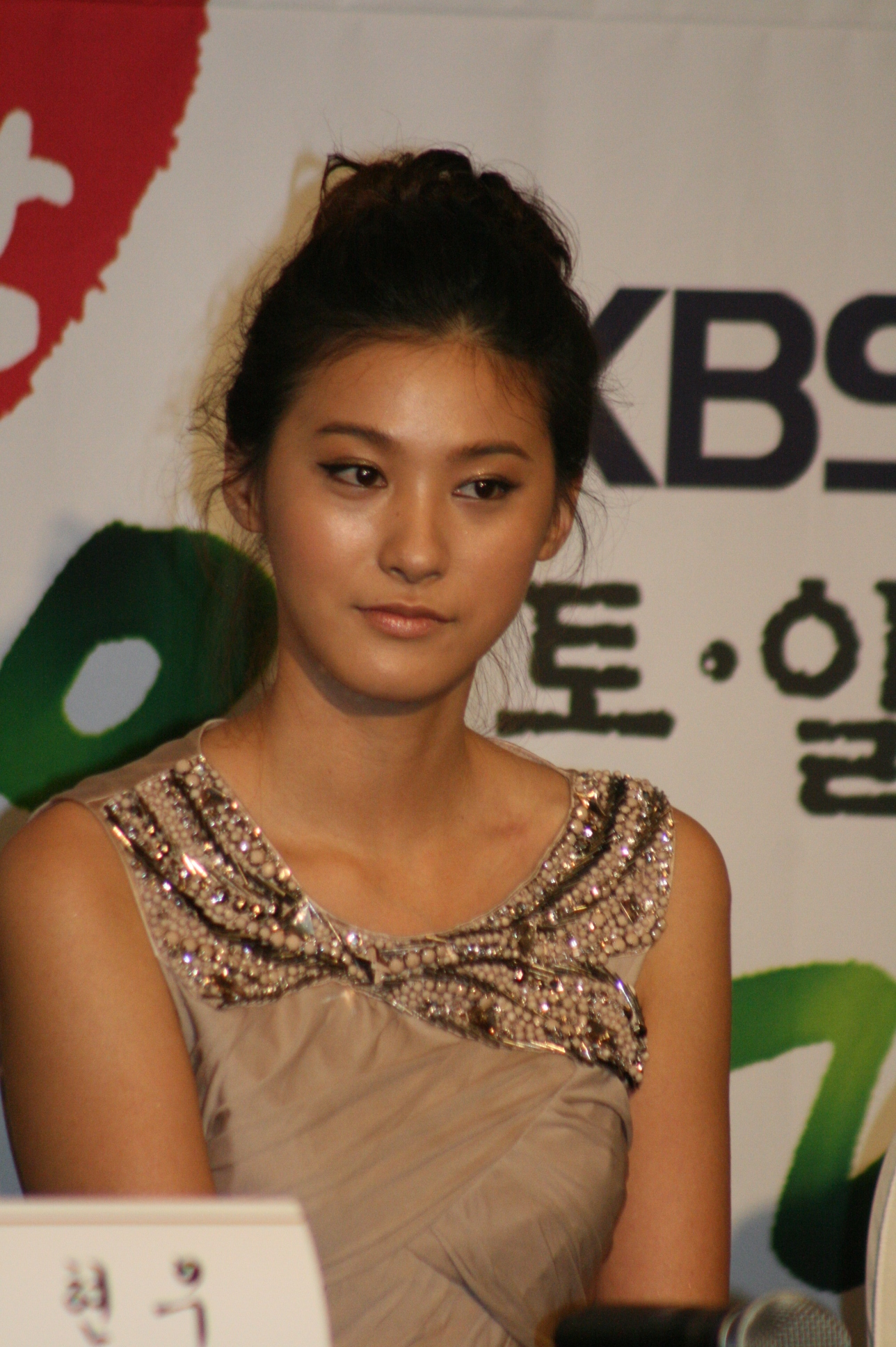
Yoo in 2008

=== Film ===
Year	Title	Role	Notes/Ref.
2004	Spy Girl	Woo Wol-ran	
2006	Les Formidables	Han Mi-rae	
2008	Crazy Waiting	Kang Jin-ah	
2008	Like Father, Like Son	Ma-ri	
2010	Remember When	Piano teacher	short film; credited as director
2011	A Piano On the Sea	Eun-soo	
2012	Rain and Rain	Ji-eun	
2013	Queen of the Night	Young-soo's blind date (cameo)	
2015	Veteran	Jeong Da-hye	
2016	Misbehavior	Choo Hye-young	
2017	House of the Disappeared	Adult Yeon-hee (cameo)	
2018	Cheese in the Trap	Baek In-ha	
2022	A Day in Tongyeong	Hee-yeon	

=== Television series ===
Year	Title	Role	Notes	Ref.
2005	Drama City: "Oh! Sarah"	Sarah	one act-drama	
2005	Loveholic	Yoon Ja-kyung		
2006	The Snow Queen	Lee Seung-ri		
2007	Drama City: "Cho Yong-pil in Our Memories"	Chan-joo	one act-drama	
2007	Likeable or Not	Bong Soo-ah		
2008	My Precious You	Baek Se-ra		
2010	A Man Called God	Jang-mi		
2011	KBS Drama Special: "Perfect Spy"	Lee Min-jung	one act-drama	
2011	You're Here, You're Here, You're Really Here	Kim Sae-bom		
2012	Dummy Mommy	Oh Chae-rin		
2012	My Husband Got a Family	Yoo Shin-hye	Cameo	
2013	Ad Genius Lee Tae-baek	Han Byul	Cameo	
2013	Wonderful Mama	Lee Soo-jin		
2013	KBS Drama Special: "The Memory in My Old Wallet"	Han Ji-woo	one act-drama	
2013	KBS Drama Special: "The Strange Cohabitation"	Kim Shin-ae	one act-drama	
2013	Empress Ki	Yeon Bi-su		
2013	My Love from the Star	Han Yoo-ra	Cameo	
2014	The Three Musketeers	Jo Mi-ryeong		
2014	Drama Festival: "4teen"	Gom-ja	one act-drama	
2015	Mask	Choi Mi-yeon		
2015	Oh My Venus	Oh Soo-jin		
2016	Goodbye Mr. Black	Yoon Ma-ri		
2017	My Golden Life	Jang So-ra		
2018	Hold Me Tight	Shin Da-hye		
2020	Good Casting	Im Ye-eun / Im Jung-eun		
2022	Crazy Love	Baek Soo-young	Supporting role	
2025	For Eagle Brothers	Ji Ok-boon		

=== Web series ===
Year	Title	Role	Notes	Ref.
2022	Work Later, Drink Now	Kim Seon-jeong	Season 2	

=== Television show ===
Year	Title	Role	Ref.
2009	It's Raining Men	Cast member	
2011	Actress House	Cast member	
2014	Star Story	Cast member	
2019	Love Me Actually	Host	

=== Music video appearances ===
Year	Song title	Artist
2004	"We Were in Love"	Lyn
2005	"2♡(Two Love)"	g.o.d
2005	"Don't Blame Him"	Wax
2007	"Deep Black"	M to M
2008	"Lalala"	SG Wannabe
2009	"Chewed Gum"	Chung Lim
2012	"Punishment"	Roh Ji-hoon

== Awards and nominations ==
Year	Award	Category	Nominated work	Result
2007	KBS Drama Awards	Best Actress in a Special/HDTV Novel/One-Act Drama	Cho Yong-pil in Our Memories	Won
2007	KBS Drama Awards	Best New Actress	Likeable or Not	Nominated
2008	44th Baeksang Arts Awards	Best New Actress (TV)	Likeable or Not	Nominated
2011	33rd Golden Cinematography Awards	Best Short Film	Remember When	Won
2011	KBS Drama Awards	Best Actress in a Special/HDTV Novel/One-Act Drama	Perfect Spy	Nominated
2012	20th Korean Culture and Entertainment Awards	Excellence Award, Actress in a Drama	Dummy Mommy	Won
2012	SBS Drama Awards	Special Award, Actress in a Weekend/Daily Drama	Dummy Mommy	Nominated
2013	8th Asia Model Awards	Fashionista Award	—N/a	Won
2013	2nd APAN Star Awards	Best Dressed	Wonderful Mama	Won
2015	4th APAN Star Awards	Popular Star Award, Actress	Mask	Won
2015	SBS Drama Awards	Special Award, Actress in a Mid-length Drama	Mask	Won
2016	MBC Drama Awards	Excellence Award, Actress in a Miniseries	Goodbye Mr. Black	Nominated
2017	22nd Chunsa Film Art Awards	Best Supporting Actress	Misbehavior	Won
2017	2017 Korean Film Shining Stars Awards	Popularity Award	Misbehavior	Won
2017	26th Buil Film Awards	Best Supporting Actress	Misbehavior	Nominated
2025	KBS Drama Awards	Excellence Award, Actress in a Serial Drama	For Eagle Brothers	Won
