= Yoon Yo-sup =

South Korean baseball player and coach

SSG Landers – No. 75
- Coach
- Born: March 30, 1982 (age 44); Seoul, South Korea
- Batted: Right Threw: Right

KBO debut
- July 10, 2008, for the SK Wyverns

Last appearance
- July 4, 2017, for the KT Wiz

KBO statistics
- Batting average: .252
- Runs batted in: 135
- Home runs: 26
- Stats at Baseball Reference

Teams
- As player: SK Wyverns (2008–2010); LG Twins (2010–2015); KT Wiz (2015–2017); As coach: KT Wiz (2018–2021); LG Twins (2022–2023); SSG Landers (2024–present)

- Korean name
- Hangul: 윤요섭
- Hanja: 尹耀涉
- RR: Yun Yoseop
- MR: Yun Yosŏp

Yoon Yo-sup (Korean: 윤요섭; born March 30, 1982) is a coach for the KT Wiz of the KBO League. He joined SK Wyverns in 2008. After that, he belonged to LG Twins in 2010, and he moved to KT Wiz in 2015. He moved from being a catcher to coach in 2017. He graduated Dankook University.
