= Bloody Beach =

- Bloody Beach poster
- Hangul: 해변으로 가다
- Hanja: 海邊으로 가다
- RR: Haebyeoneuro gada
- MR: Haebyŏnŭro kada
- Directed by: Kim In-soo
- Written by: Baek Seung-jae; No Zin-soo; Park Mi-young; Shim Hae-won; Son Kwang-soo
- Produced by: Koo Bon-han
- Starring: Kim Hyun-jung; Lee Se-eun; Lee Seung-chae; Lee Jung-jin; Lee hyun kyun
- Cinematography: Kim Yoon-soo
- Edited by: Kim Sang-bum
- Music by: Bang Jun-seok; Jo Yeong-wook
- Distributed by: Koo-aen Films; Dragon Film
- Release date: August 12, 2000
- Country: South Korea
- Language: Korean

Bloody Beach (Korean: 해변으로 가다; RR: Haebyeoneuro gada) is a 2000 South Korean slasher film starring Kim Hyun-jung and Jae Hee.

== Synopsis ==
A group of chat room buddies decide to meet together in person on the beach for some fun in the sun. However, their vacation transforms into a nightmare as each person except Nam-kyeong (Kim Hyun-jung) is gruesomely murdered by the mysterious 'Sandmanzz'.

== Cast ==
- Kim Hyun-jung - Nam-kyeong
- Lee hyun kyun - Won-il (Sandmanzz)
- Lee Se-eun - Yeong-woo
- Lee Seung-chae - Yu-na
- Lee Jung-jin - Sang-tae
- Jin tae sung-Jung min
- Kim Min-sun - Do-yeon
- Lee Eun-ju-Mermaid
- Yang Dong-geun -Jae seung
