= Only You (2005 TV series) =

- Genre: Romantic comedy Drama
- Written by: Hwang Sung-yeon
- Directed by: Choi Mun-seok
- Starring: Han Chae-young; Jo Hyun-jae; Lee Chun-hee; Hong Soo-hyun
- Country of origin: South Korea
- Original language: Korean
- No. of episodes: 16

Production
- Executive producers: Koo Bon-gun; Jeong Young-bum
- Producer: Kim Yang
- Production locations: Seoul, South Korea; Venice, Italy
- Running time: 30 minutes
- Production companies: iJ Entertainment; Star J Entertainment

Original release
- Network: SBS
- Release: 4 June – 24 July 2005

Related
- Only You (Philippine adaptation)

Only You is a 2005 South Korean television series starring Han Chae-young, Jo Hyun-jae, Lee Chun-hee and Hong Soo-hyun. It is produced and broadcast by SBS from 4 June to 24 July 2005 for 16 episodes.

It is the only Korean drama shot in Italy. Part of the series was filmed in Vicenza, a city in the Veneto region near Venice and Verona.

== Plot ==
Eun-jae (Han Chae-young) is a very stubborn and proud 20-year-old girl who has a passion for cooking. Because she does not have an interest in studying, she runs away to Vicenza in Italy before she graduates from high school to enroll in a cooking school. Her high school friend, who loves her dearly and shares her passion for cooking, comes along with her.

Han Yi-joon (Jo Hyun-jae) is from a wealthy family who owns a large hotel and various restaurants. He travels to Italy in search of his mother that abandoned his family when he was young and there he runs into Eun-jae. Coincidentally, Eun-jae had also been seeking the mother, who happens to be a chef in Vicenza, to learn the secrets to making great pasta. Both chance upon the mother just as she was about to get remarried to an Italian man. She comforts Yi-joon, who is distraught over his mother's remarriage, and they spend the night together. She ends up pregnant and has to give up her dream – but does not tell Yi-joon.

Six years later, they have all returned to live in South Korea – Eun-jae working low paying cooking jobs, Yi-joon taking over the operations of his family's restaurant, and Eun-jae's friend working as a chef for one of the restaurants owned by Yi-joon and financially supporting Eun-jae's family, including the child born out of wedlock, because they have fallen on hard times. Yi-joon still has feelings for Eun-jae and they run into each other just as he is looking for a new chef for his restaurant-with her in mind. Soon Hyeon who is a family friend of Yi-joon is in love with him and tries to confess her feelings to him

== Cast ==
The four main characters of Only You

- Han Chae-young as Cha Eun-jae
- Jo Hyun-jae as Han Yi-joon
- Lee Chun-hee as Jung Hyun-sung
- Hong Soo-hyun as Ji Soon-yeon
- Lee Byung-joon as Cha Jin-sol
- Jung Won-joong as Cha Sung-taek
- Song Ok-sook as Park Mi-jung
- Jeon Hye-bin as Cha Soo-jae
- Jung Wook as Han Seung-ryeol
- Jung Ae-ri as Yoon Hee-jin
- Lee Ah-hyun as Han Yi-kyung

== List of episodes ==
Episode 1

Hyun-sung and Eun-jae win the Noodle King cooking contest. Her mother is not impressed with her cooking ambitions and enrolls her in a boarding school. Hyun-sung and Eun-jae run away to Italy to study cooking. To pass the final exam, she wants to learn a pasta recipe from a South Korean woman in Italy. She bumps into Yi-joon who is there looking for his mother. By coincidence, they discover they are looking for the same person and begrudgingly help each other to locate her.

Episode 2

They find Yi-joon's mother just before she gets married. She does not tell Yi-joon that she recognises him but teaches Eun-jae the pepper pasta recipe. Eun-jae and Yi-joon sleep together. In the morning when Eun-jae is out, Hyun-sung enters the apartment, getting into a fight with Yi-joon. Yi-joon leaves thinking Hyun-sung is Eun-jae's boyfriend. Six years passes, Eun-jae is a single mother to Jin-sol. She had a job in a restaurant as a busser. Yi-joon unknowingly tasted her pasta when the restaurant's chef accidentally stepped on a spilled cooking oil and fell. Eun-jae cooks the food for Yi-joon without permission from the manager.

Episode 3

Yi-joon starts his plan to improve a restaurant as a test from his father. Eun-jae begins a new job serving snacks in a bar and accidentally meets Yi-joon again. Eun-jae is offered a job at Yi-joon's restaurant.

Episode 4

Eun-jae takes the job at Yi-joon's restaurant. Hyun-sung is pulled from his regular restaurant to train her. Eun-jae's first task is to develop a new menu. Although her first few dishes are nothing spectacular, her special roast chicken impresses. An open tasting is organised to gauge public reaction.

Episode 5

Yi-joon looks through Eun-jae's purse and discovers a photo of her and Jin-sol. There's an open tasting at the restaurant and Eun-jae's family unknowingly turn up. Believing her family is biased in the evaluation, the results are declared invalid. Eun-jae is given one more chance to impress a critic. She and Yi-joon search the countryside for a special garlic. Yi-joon finally asked Eun-jae out.

Episode 6

An unexpected visit by Jin-sol and Eun-jae's sister to Hyun-sung's workplace leads Soon-yeon to discover that Eun-jae is a single mother. A food critic turns up to try out Eun-jae's cuisine. Seeing the critic has a cold, she abandons her initial dishes and makes hot soup for the critic. The critic although touched with the thought, says he can not give a good review as he did not taste the real food of the establishment.

Episode 7

Yi-joon gets mad at Eun-jae on discovering she's a single mother. She leaves the restaurant and helps out at a canteen on a construction site. Eun-jae's parents instruct Hyun-sung on how to attract Eun-jae. Yi-joon asks Eun-jae if he is the father, but Eun-jae denies it. Yi-joon convinces Eun-jae to cook for the chairman. The chairman is impressed and names Eun-jae as head chef for that franchise, however she does not return to take the position.

Episode 8

Yi-joon finally confesses that he's in love with Eun-jae. Eun-jae returns to work at the canteen near the construction site. After Yi-joon pesters her daily at the canteen, she agrees to return. A brand new kitchen is set up for Eun-jae to try new recipes.

Episode 9

Hyun-sung and Soon-yeon confront Yi-joon and Eun-jae. Eun-jae's parents still hope that she and Hyun-sung will get together. A promotional photo show Yi-joon and Eun-jae close together. Yi-joon purchases an apartment for Eun-jae's family and tries to persuade her to move out of Hyun-sung's house.

Episode 10

After Eun-jae tells Hyun-sung that they will not be together, Hyun-sung drowns his sorrows in bottles of alcohol. Yi-joon forgets Soon-yeon's birthday and breaks her heart. Eun-jae refuses to have the restaurant's food taken for a television show after she finds out that colouring is added. This ruins the chance to boost the restaurant's popularity. Soon-yeon discovers that Jin-sol is Yi-joon's son.

Episode 11

Yi-joon's father discovers Eun-jae is a single mother. Yi-joon asks her to tell everyone that he is father without knowing that he really is the father. Eun-jae takes Jin-sol to have day out with Yi-joon. Jin-sol sees Hyun-sung as his paternal influence and gets Yi-joon jealous. Eun-jae's family moves out to a smaller apartment.

Episode 12

Eun-jae is about to tell Yi-joon that Jin-sol is his son. Yi-joon is angry that this information was hidden from him. Yi-joon has a change of heart and wants to take a larger role as Jin-sol's father. Eun-jae's father asks Yi-joon to provide him with an expensive shop contract. Soon-yeon approaches Yi-joon's father seeking to marry Yi-joon. In a bar, Soon-yeon and Hyun-sung drink their sorrows away with the knowledge that neither may actually be happy in their current situation.

Episode 13

A leaked company announcement reveals that Eun-jae and Yi-joon are dating. Eun-jae's mother finds out that her hushand accepted an expensive store contract from Yi-joon and makes him give it back. Yi-joon proposes to Eun-jae stating that although he doesn't have a ring, Jin-sol represents a ring for them. Yi-joon's father, in an effort to separate the two, issues a letter stating that he will contest custody of Eun-jae's son.

Episode 14

Eun-jae begins working as an assistant in a TV cooking show. The chef is especially cruel to Eun-jae. Yi-joon and Eun-jae decide to go their separate ways, with Yi-joon agreeing to marry Soon-yeon. A party is held to formally introduce Yi-joon and Soon-yeon as engaged.

Episode 15

Yi-joon cancels his engagement and runs into Eun-jae. Eun-jae gets mad at him fearing that Yi-joon's father will start a custody battle to take Jin-sol away from her. At the television studio where Eun-jae works, she accidentally comes across a secret South Korean sauce from the chef there. Yi-joon's father approaches Eun-jae with an offer to leave. The episode ends with Yi-joon finally tells Jin-sol that he is his father.

Episode 16

Eun-jae has to prepare an Italian-South Korean fusion dish to save the restaurant. She perfects a secret sauce from a South Korean chef and prepares a great dish. With the restaurant saved, she contemplates leaving to another country but comes to realization that she cannot leave Jin-sol without a father. Soon-yeon finally gets over Yi-joon and decides to expand her education in Japan. Hyun-sung quits as chef of his franchise and is able to let go of Eun-jae. Eun-jae and Yi-joon get married and return to Italy to visit the latter's mother. Yi-joon's father donates his money to charity and spends his time assisting in Yi-joon's restaurant. They all live happily ever after with Jin-sol.

== Adaptation ==
In 2009, ABS-CBN produced a Philippine remake based on Only You. The adaptation was originally aired from 27 April to 21 August 2009.
