= Kim Hyun-jung (painter) =

South Korean painter (born 1988)

- Born: 1988 (age 37–38)
- Education: Seoul National University
- Known for: Painting (Coy Story series)
- Website: kimhyunjung.kr

Kim Hyun-jung (김현정; born 1988) is a South Korean painter who works in the Korean painting tradition. She is known for the Coy Story series (Korean: 내숭, naesoong), self-portraits of the artist in hanbok engaged in contemporary activities, which she describes as "21st-century genre painting". The Korea JoongAng Daily has called her the "idol of Korean painting".

== Early life and education ==
Kim began drawing at the age of eight and attended Sunhwa Arts High School, where she chose to major in Korean painting. She later studied Oriental painting and business administration at Seoul National University.

== Work ==
Kim's Coy Story paintings depict a woman in hanbok – the artist herself – in modern settings. Her process begins with a nude drawing, over which she builds the hanbok by collaging dyed hanji (traditional Korean mulberry paper). In 2014 The Korea Times described her series of Oriental paintings showing her alter ego in hanbok during everyday activities such as rollerblading, shopping and preparing for a night out; the series began with sketches of herself in a mirror.

A 2013 painting of a woman in hanbok eating a hamburger and french fries made her popular with social media users and young people, according to The Korea Herald, which also noted that her paintings address themes such as social-media envy and the pressures facing young Koreans.

== Exhibitions ==
- Feign Olympic (June 2014), Gana Insa Art Center, Seoul.
- Feign Amusement Park (April 2016), Gallery Is, Insa-dong, Seoul – reported by The Korea Herald as her eighth solo exhibition.
- A special exhibition on 6 December 2022 in Washington, D.C., held to support the proposed designation of a national Kimchi Day, reported by The Dong-A Ilbo and TV Chosun.

== Recognition ==
- Named to the Forbes "30 Under 30 Asia" list in 2017.
- As of 2026, Kim serves as an ambassador for the Seoul Metropolitan Government and for the disaster-relief organization Hope Bridge, and Korean media report that her works appear in 31 elementary, middle and high school textbooks.
