= List of South Korean films of 2017 =

This is a list of South Korean films that received a domestic theatrical release in 2017.

== Box office ==
The highest-grossing South Korean films released in 2017, by domestic box office gross revenue, are as follows:

Highest-grossing films released in 2017
Rank	Title	Distributor	Domestic gross
1	Along With the Gods: The Two Worlds	Lotte Cultureworks	$94,010,097
2	A Taxi Driver	Showbox	$77,893,474
3	Confidential Assignment	CJ Entertainment	$51,822,638
4	1987: When the Day Comes	CJ Entertainment	$47,292,501
5	The Outlaws	Megabox Plus M	$45,760,606
6	The Battleship Island	CJ Entertainment	$41,038,808
7	Midnight Runners	Lotte Cultureworks	$36,065,351
8	The King	Next Entertainment World	$35,342,745
9	Steel Rain	Next Entertainment World	$28,839,872
10	The Swindlers	Showbox	$25,445,773

== Released ==
Released	English title	Korean title	Director	Cast	Distributor
January 4	Because I Love You	사랑하기 때문에	Joo Ji-hoong	Cha Tae-hyun, Kim Yoo-jung	Next Entertainment World
January 4	Misbehavior	여교사	Kim Tae-yong	Kim Ha-neul, Lee Won-geun	Filament Pictures
January 5	Dirty Romance	더티 로맨스	Lee Sang-woo	Kim Joon-woo, Ahn Ha-na, Gil Deok-ho, Choi Hong-jun	
January 5	Don't Worry	걱정말아요	Kim Dae-gyeon, Kim Hyun, Sin Jong-hoon, So Joon-moon		Rainbow Factory
January 12	Moon Young	문영	Kim So-yeon	Kim Tae-ri	KT&G Sangsangmandang
January 12	Ordinary People	소시민	Kim Byung-June		
January 12	Seven Years - Journalism Without Journalist	7년-그들이 없는 언론	Kim Jin-hyuk		
January 18	Confidential Assignment	공조	Kim Sung-hoon	Hyun Bin, Yoo Hae-jin	CJ Entertainment
January 18	The King	더킹	Han Jae-rim	Jo In-sung, Jung Woo-sung	Next Entertainment World
January 18	Turning Mecard W: Resurrection of the Black Mirror	터닝메카드W: 블랙미러의 부활	Hong Heon-pyo		Heewon Entertainment
January 19	Another Way	다른 길이 있다	Cho Chang-Ho	Kim Jae-wook, Seo Ye-ji	Mohm Pictures
January 24	Eun-ha	은하	Lim Jin-seung		Golden Tide Pictures
January 26	Try to Remember	다방의 푸른 꿈	Kim Dae-hyeon		Indeline
February 1	Le Tour: My Last 49 Days	뚜르: 내 생애 최고의 49일	Jeon Il-woo, Kim Yang-rae, Lim Jung-ha, Park Hyung-jun		Little Big Pictures
February 9	Fabricated City	조작된 도시	Park Kwang-hyun	Ji Chang-wook, Shim Eun-kyung	CJ Entertainment
February 15	New Trial	재심	Kim Tae-yoon	Jung Woo, Kang Ha-neul, Lee Dong-hwi	Opus Pictures
February 15	My Little Brother	그래, 가족	Ma Dae-yoon	Lee Yo-won, Jung Man-sik	Walt Disney Korea
February 22	Lucid Dream	루시드 드림	Kim Joon-sung	Sul Kyung-gu, Go Soo, Kang Hye-jung	Next Entertainment World
February 22	Single Rider	싱글라이더	Lee Joo-young	Lee Byung-hun, Gong Hyo-jin, Ahn So-hee	Warner Bros.
February 24	I'm Doing Fine in Middle School	중2라도 괜찮아	Park Soo-yeong		
March 1	A Stray Goat	눈발	Cho Jae-min	Park Jin-young, Ji Woo	Little Big Pictures
March 1	Bluebeard	해빙	Lee Soo-yeon	Cho Jin-woong	Lotte Entertainment
March 1	Coffee Mate	커피메이트	Lee Hyun-ha		Storm Pictures
March 1	Snowy Road	눈길	Lee Na-jeong	Kim Hyang-gi, Kim Sae-ron	CGV Arthouse
March 2	Recording	녹화중이야	Park Min-kook		
March 9	The Artist: Reborn	아티스트: 다시 태어나다	Kim Kyoung-won		Contents Panda
March 9	Trumpet on the Cliff	절벽 위의 트럼펫	Han Sang-hee		
March 16	Part-Time Spy	비정규직 특수요원	Kim Deok-soo		Storm Pictures
March 23	Ordinary Person	보통사람	Kim Bong-han	Son Hyun-joo, Jang Hyuk	Opus Pictures
March 23	On the Beach at Night Alone	밤의 해변에서 혼자	Hong Sang-soo		Contents Panda
March 23	The Prison	프리즌	Na Hyun	Han Suk-kyu, Kim Rae-won	Showbox
March 29	One Line	원라인	Yang Kyung-mo	Im Si-wan, Jin Goo	Next Entertainment World
April 5	One Day	어느날	Lee Yoon-ki	Kim Nam-gil, Chun Woo-hee	Opus Pictures / CGV Arthouse
April 5	House of the Disappeared	시간위의 집	Lim Dae-woong	Kim Yun-jin, Ok Taec-yeon	Little Big Pictures
April 6	Cherry Blossoms, Again	다시, 벚꽃	Yu Hae-jin		JINJIN Pictures
April 6	One Step	원스텝	Juhn Jai-hong	Sandara Park, Han Jae-suk, Hong Ah-reum	
April 12	Daddy You, Daughter Me	아빠는 딸	Kim Hyeong-hyeop	Jung So-min, Yoon Je-moon	Megabox Plus M
April 20	Marianne and Margaret	마리안느와 마가렛	Yun Se-yeong		PopEntertainment
April 20	My Little Baby, Jaya	지렁이	Yoon Hak-ryul	Kim Jeong-kyoon, Oh Ye-seol	
April 26	Suh-Suh Pyoung, Slowly and Peacefully	서서평, 천천히 평온하게	Hong Hyeon-jeong, Hong Joo-yeon		Connect Pictures
April 26	The King's Case Note	임금님의 사건수첩	Moon Hyun-sung	Lee Sun-kyun, Ahn Jae-hong	CJ Entertainment
April 26	The Mayor	특별시민	Park In-je	Choi Min-sik, Kwak Do-won	Showbox
April 27	Theatrical Version Tobot : The Attack and of the Robot Army	극장판 또봇: 로봇군단의 습격	Go Dong-woo, Lee Dahl		
May 3	Super White Bear: Spy Adventures	슈퍼 빼꼼: 스파이 대작전	Lim Ah-ron		Megabox Plus M
May 3	The Sheriff In Town	보안관	Kim Hyung-ju	Lee Sung-min, Cho Jin-woong	Lotte Entertainment
May 9	The Tooth and the Nail	석조저택 살인사건	Kim Hwi, Jung Sik	Go Soo, Kim Joo-hyuk, Park Sung-woong	Kidari Ent
May 11	Come, Together	컴, 투게더	Shin Dong-il	Im Hyeon-gook, Lee Hye-eun, Chae Bin	
May 11	The Way	길	Jung In-bong	Kim Hye-ja, Song Jae-ho, Heo Jin	Double & Joy Pictures
May 17	The Merciless	불한당: 나쁜 놈들의 세상	Byun Sung-hyun	Sul Kyung-gu, Im Si-wan	CJ Entertainment
May 18	Blue Busking	마차 타고 고래고래	An Jae-seok	Jo Han-sun, Han Ji-sang, Park Hyo-joo	Wide Release
May 25	Biting Fly	쇠파리	Ahn Cheol-ho	Kim Jin-woo, Lee Yeon-doo	Gram Films
May 25	Just for You	너에게만 들려주고 싶어	Park Byoung-hwan	Tim, Son Ha-jung, Choi Jong-nam, Cha Soo-bin	Activers Entertainment
May 31	Jane	꿈의 제인	Cho Hyun-hoon	Lee Min-ji, Koo Kyo-hwan	Atnine Film, CGV Arthouse
May 31	Warriors of the Dawn	대립군	Chung Yoon-chul	Lee Jung-jae, Yeo Jin-goo	20th Century Fox
June 1	Our Diary	우리들의 일기	Lim Gong-sam	Yoon Sung-mo, Shin Ji-hoon	Dreamfact Entertainment
June 8	Delta Boys	델타 보이즈	Ko Bong-soo	Baek Seung-hwan, Lee Woong-bin, Shin Min-jae, Kim Choong-gil	Indiestory
June 8	The Villainess	악녀	Jung Byung-gil	Kim Ok-bin, Shin Ha-kyun, Sung Joon	Next Entertainment World
June 8	Yongsoon	용순	Shin Joon	Lee Soo-kyung, Choi Deok-moon	Lotte Entertainment
June 15	A Day	하루	Cho Sun-ho	Kim Myung-min, Byun Yo-han, Yoo Jae-myung, Jo Eun-hyung	CGV Arthouse
June 15	Karaoke Crazies	중독노래방	Kim Sang-chan	Lee Moon-sik, Bae So-eun	Little Big Pictures
June 28	Real	리얼	Lee Sa-rang	Kim Soo-hyun, Sung Dong-il, Lee Sung-min	CJ Entertainment
June 29	Okja	옥자	Bong Joon-ho	Ahn Seo-hyun, Tilda Swinton, Paul Dano, Jake Gyllenhaal	Next Entertainment World
June 29	Anarchist from Colony	박열	Lee Joon-ik	Lee Je-hoon	Megabox Plus M
July 6	Ash Flower	재꽃	Park Suk-young	Jeong Ha-dam, Jang Hae-gum	
July 6	The Day After	그 후	Hong Sang-soo	Kim Min-hee, Kwon Hae-hyo	
July 13	Beastie Girls	비스티 걸스	Sin Ji-woo	Go Eun-ah, Yoo So-young, Kim Seo-ji	Mago Film
July 26	The Battleship Island	군함도	Ryoo Seung-wan	Hwang Jung-min, So Ji-sub, Song Joong-ki	CJ Entertainment
July 27	Fork Lane	포크레인	Lee Ju-hyoung	Uhm Tae-woong	Kim Ki-duk Film
August 2	A Taxi Driver	택시 운전사	Jang Hoon	Song Kang-ho, Thomas Kretschmann, Yoo Hae-jin, Ryu Jun-yeol	Showbox
August 3	Write or Dance	여자들	Lee Sang-deok	Choi Si-hyung, Jeon Yeo-been, Chae Seo-jin	Indiestory
August 9	Midnight Runners	청년경찰	Jason Kim (Kim Ju-hwan)	Park Seo-joon, Kang Ha-neul	Lotte Entertainment
August 17	The Mimic	장산범	Huh Jung	Yum Jung-ah, Park Hyuk-kwon	Next Entertainment World
August 23	V.I.P	브이아이피	Park Hoon-jung	Jang Dong-gun, Kim Myung-min, Lee Jong-suk, Park Hee-soon	Peppermint & Company
August 24	The Table	더 테이블	Kim Jong-kwan	Im Soo-jung, Jung Yu-mil, Han Ye-ri, Jung Eun-chae	Vol Media K
August 30	Roman Holiday	로마의 휴일	Lee Duk-hee	Im Chang-jung, Gong Hyung-jin, Jung Sang-hoon	Megabox Plus M
September 6	Memoir of a Murderer	살인자의 기억법	Won Shin-yun	Sul Kyung-gu, Kim Nam-gil, Seolhyun, Oh Dal-su	Showbox
September 14	Spirits’ Homecoming, Unfinished Story	귀향, 끝나지 않은 이야기	Cho Jung-rae	Park Ji-hee, Kang Ha-na, Seo Mi-ji, Hong Se-na	Connect Pictures
September 14	The End of April	사월의 끝	Kim Kwang-bok	Park Ji-soo, Lee Bit-na, Jang So-yeon	BM Cultures
September 14	The Running Actress	여배우는 오늘도	Moon So-ri	Moon So-ri, Seong Byeong-sook, Yoon Sang-hwa, Jeon Yeo-been	
September 14	The Poet and the Boy	시인의 사랑	Kim Yang-hee	Yang Ik-june, Jeon Hye-jin, Jung Ga-ram	CJ CGV
September 21	The Star Next Door	이웃집 스타	Kim Seong-wook	Han Chae-young, Jin Ji-hee, Lim Seul-ong	Storm Pictures
September 21	I Can Speak	아이 캔 스피크	Kim Hyun-seok	Na Moon-hee, Lee Je-hoon	Lotte Entertainment
September 27	Lost to Shame	분장	Nam Yeon-woo	Nam Yeon-woo, Ahn Sung-min	MOVement
October 3	The Fortress	남한산성	Hwang Dong-hyuk	Lee Byung-hun, Kim Yoon-seok, Go Soo, Park Hae-il	CJ Entertainment
October 3	The Nut Job 2: Nutty by Nature	넛잡 2	Cal Brunker	Will Arnett, Maya Rudolph, Jackie Chan, Katherine Heigl	Lotte Entertainment
October 3	The Outlaws	범죄도시	Kang Yoon-sung	Ma Dong-seok, Yoon Kye-sang, Jo Jae-yoon	Megabox Plus M
October 12	RV: Resurrected Victims	희생부활자	Kwak Kyung-taek	Kim Rae-won, Kim Hae-sook	Showbox
October 19	Man of Will	대장 김창수	Lee Won-tae	Cho Jin-woong, Song Seung-heon	Kidari Ent
October 19	Autumn Sonata	가을 우체국	Lim Wang-tae	BoA, Lee Hak-Joo	
October 25	Glass Garden	유리정원	Shin Su-won	Moon Geun-young, Kim Tae-hoon	Little Big Pictures
October 26	Beautiful Tomorrow	뷰티풀 투모로우	Jang Jae-hyuk	Park Hyo-shin, Jung Jae-il	
November 2	Heart Blackened	침묵	Jung Ji-woo	Choi Min-sik, Park Shin-hye, Ryu Jun-yeol	CJ Entertainment
November 2	Method	메소드	Bang Eun-jin	Park Sung-woong, Yoon Seung-ah, Oh Seung-hoon	Atnine Film
November 2	The Bros	부라더	Chang You-jeong	Ma Dong-seok, Lee Dong-hwi, Lee Ha-nui	Megabox Plus M
November 2	My Last Love	내게 남은 사랑을	Jin Kwang-gyo	Sung Ji-ru, Jeon Mi-seon, Kwon So-hyun	BM Cultures
November 9	A Special Lady	미옥	Lee An-gyu	Kim Hye-soo, Lee Sun-kyun, Lee Hee-joon	Kidari Entertainment
November 9	The Preparation	채비	Cho Young-jun	Go Doo-shim, Kim Sung-kyun	Opus Pictures
November 15	Room No.7	7호실	Lee Yong-seung	Shin Ha-kyun, Do Kyung-soo	Lotte Entertainment
November 16	Romans 8:37	로마서 8:37	Shin Yeon-shick	Lee Hyun-ho, Seo Dong-gab	
November 22	The Swindlers	꾼	Jang Chang-won	Hyun Bin, Yoo Ji-tae, Bae Seong-woo, Park Sung-woong, Nana, Ahn Se-ha	Showbox
November 23	The Age of Blood	역모 - 반란의 시대	Kim Hong-seon	Jung Hae-in, Kim Ji-hoon, Jo Jae-yoon	Storm Pictures
November 29	Forgotten	기억의 밤	Jang Hang-jun	Kang Ha-neul, Kim Mu-yeol, Moon Sung-keun, Na Young-hee	Megabox Plus M
November 29	The Chase	반드시 잡는다	Kim Hong-seon	Baek Yoon-sik, Sung Dong-il, Chun Ho-jin	Next Entertainment World
December 7	Pororo, Dinosaur Island Adventure	뽀로로 극장판 공룡섬 대모험	Kim Hyeon-ho, Yoon Je-hwan	Lee Seon, Lee Mi-ja	Next Entertainment World
December 7	The Return	돌아온다	Heo Chul	Kim Yu-seok, Son Soo-hyun, Park Byung-eun	Double & Joy Pictures
December 14	Steel Rain	강철비	Yang Woo-suk	Jung Woo-sung, Kwak Do-won	Next Entertainment World
December 20	Along With the Gods: The Two Worlds	신과함께-죄와 벌	Kim Yong-hwa	Ha Jung-woo, Cha Tae-hyun, Kim Hyang-gi, Lee Jung-jae, Ju Ji-hoon, Do Kyung-soo	Lotte Entertainment
December 27	1987: When the Day Comes	1987	Jang Joon-hwan	Kim Yoon-seok, Ha Jung-woo, Yoo Hae-jin, Kim Tae-ri	CJ Entertainment

== See also ==
- 2017 in South Korea
- 2017 in South Korean music
