= List of 2019 box office number-one films in South Korea =

The following is a list of 2019 box office number-one films in South Korea. When the number-one film in gross is not the same as the number-one film in admissions, both are listed.

== Number-one films ==
†	This implies the highest-grossing movie of the year.

#	Date	Film	Gross	Notes
1	January 6, 2019	Ralph Breaks the Internet	US$4.6 million	
2	January 13, 2019	Mal-Mo-E: The Secret Mission	US$6.1 million	
3	January 20, 2019	Mal-Mo-E: The Secret Mission	US$4.8 million	
4	January 27, 2019	Extreme Job †	US$19.0 million	
5	February 3, 2019	Extreme Job †	US$19.5 million	
6	February 10, 2019	Extreme Job †	US$14.2 million	
7	February 17, 2019	Extreme Job †	US$7.1 million	
8	February 24, 2019	Svaha: The Sixth Finger	US$6.5 million	
9	March 3, 2019	A Resistance	US$4.5 million	
10	March 10, 2019	Captain Marvel	US$18.1 million	
11	March 17, 2019	Captain Marvel	US$8.1 million	
12	March 24, 2019	Money	US$8.8 million	
13	March 31, 2019	Us	US$5.0 million	
14	April 7, 2019	Shazam!	US$2.8 million	
15	April 14, 2019	Birthday	US$1.7 million	
16	April 21, 2019	Birthday	US$1.2 million	
17	April 28, 2019	Avengers: Endgame	US$32.1 million	
18	May 5, 2019	Avengers: Endgame	US$18.0 million	
19	May 12, 2019	Avengers: Endgame	US$6.3 million	
20	May 19, 2019	The Gangster, The Cop, The Devil	US$8.5 million	
21	May 26, 2019	Aladdin	US$6.1 million	
22	June 2, 2019	Parasite	US$20.7 million	
23	June 9, 2019	Parasite	US$12.3 million	
24	June 16, 2019	Aladdin	US$7.8 million	
25	June 23, 2019	Toy Story 4	US$7.4 million	
26	June 30, 2019	Aladdin	US$6.8 million	
27	July 7, 2019	Spider-Man: Far From Home	US$21.3 million	
28	July 14, 2019	Spider-Man: Far From Home	US$9.8 million	
29	July 21, 2019	The Lion King	US$13.4 million	
30	July 28, 2019	The Lion King	US$6.3 million	
31	August 4, 2019	Exit	US$14.9 million	
32	August 11, 2019	Exit	US$10.6 million	
33	August 18, 2019	Hobbs & Shaw	US$8.5 million	
34	August 25, 2019	Metamorphosis	US$4.3 million	
35	September 1, 2019	Tune in for Love	US$3.1 million	
36	September 8, 2019	It Chapter Two	US$2.3 million	
37	September 15, 2019	The Bad Guys: Reign of Chaos	US$14.8 million	
38	September 22, 2019	The Bad Guys: Reign of Chaos	US$4.9 million	
39	September 29, 2019	The Battle of Jangsari	US$3.5 million	
40	October 6, 2019	Joker	US$9.7 million	
41	October 13, 2019	Joker	US$5.7 million	
42	October 20, 2019	Maleficent: Mistress of Evil	US$4.1 million	
43	October 27, 2019	Kim Ji-young: Born 1982	US$6.4 million	
44	November 3, 2019	Terminator: Dark Fate	US$7.2 million	
45	November 10, 2019	The Divine Move 2: The Wrathful	US$6.7 million	
46	November 17, 2019	Black Money	US$5.9 million	
47	November 24, 2019	Frozen 2	US$28.0 million	
48	December 1, 2019	Frozen 2	US$18.7 million	
49	December 8, 2019	Frozen 2	US$10.1 million	
50	December 15, 2019	Frozen 2	US$6.6 million	
51	December 22, 2019	Ashfall	US$15.2 million	
52	December 29, 2019	Ashfall	US$9.0 million	

== See also ==
- List of South Korean films of 2019
