= List of South Korean films of 2019 =

The following is a list of South Korean films released in 2019.

== Box office ==
The highest-grossing South Korean films released in 2019, by domestic box office gross revenue, are as follows:

Highest-grossing films released in 2019
Rank	Title	Distributor	Domestic gross
1	Extreme Job	CJ Entertainment	$113,411,607
2	Parasite	CJ Entertainment	$71,023,050
3	Exit	CJ Entertainment	$64,384,781
4	Ashfall	CJ Entertainment	$56,704,049
5	The Battle: Roar to Victory	Showbox	$32,961,384
6	The Bad Guys: Reign of Chaos	CJ Entertainment	$32,126,194
7	Kim Ji-young: Born 1982	Lotte Cultureworks	$24,610,804
8	The Gangster, the Cop, the Devil	Kiwi Media Group	$23,659,055
9	Money	Showbox	$23,445,058
10	Start-Up	Next Entertainment World	$22,855,971

== Released ==
Released	English title	Native title	Director(s)	Cast
January 1	No Mercy	언니	Im Gyeong-taek	Lee Si-young, Park Se-wan, Lee Joon-hyuk
January 9	The Dude in Me	내안의 그놈	Kang Hyo-jin	Park Sung-woong, Jung Jin-young, Ra Mi-ran
January 9	Mal-Mo-E: The Secret Mission	말모이	Eom Yu-na	Yoo Hae-jin, Yoon Kye-sang
January 16	Rosebud	그대 이름은 장미	Jo Seok-hyun	Yoo Ho-jeong, Park Sung-woong, Oh Jung-se, Chae Soo-bin
January 16	Underdog	언더독	Oh Sung-yoon, Lee Chun-baek	Do Kyung-soo, Park So-dam, Park Chul-min
January 17	Mate	메이트	Jung Dae-gun	Jung Hye-sung, Shim Hee-sub
January 23	Extreme Job	극한직업	Lee Byeong-heon	Ryu Seung-ryong, Lee Hanee, Jin Seon-kyu, Lee Dong-hwi, Gong Myung
January 26	Love Yourself in Seoul	러브 유어셀프 인 서울	Big Hit Entertainment	RM, Jin, Suga, J-Hope, Jimin, V, Jungkook
January 30	Hit-and-Run Squad	뺑반	Han Jun-hee	Gong Hyo-jin, Ryu Jun-yeol, Jo Jung-suk
February 13	Innocent Witness	증인	Lee Han	Jung Woo-sung, Kim Hyang-gi, Lee Kyu-hyung
February 15	The Odd Family: Zombie On Sale	기묘한 가족	Lee Min-jae	Jung Jae-young, Kim Nam-gil, Uhm Ji-won
February 20	Svaha: The Sixth Finger	사바하	Jang Jae-hyun	Lee Jung-jae, Park Jung-min
February 27	Trade Your Love	어쩌다, 결혼	Park Ho-chan, Park Soo-jin	Kim Dong-wook, Ko Sung-hee
February 27	Race to Freedom: Um Bok Dong	자전차왕 엄복동	Kim Ryu-sung	Rain, Kang So-ra, Lee Bum-soo, Min Hyo-rin
February 27	A Resistance	항거: 유관순 이야기	Jo Min-ho	Go Ah-sung, Kim Sae-byuk, Kim Ye-eun, Jeong Ha-dam
March 20	Idol	우상	Lee Soo-jin	Han Suk-kyu, Sul Kyung-gu, Chun Woo-hee
March 20	Money	돈	Park Noo-ri	Ryu Jun-yeol, Yoo Ji-tae, Jo Woo-jin
March 27	Sunkist Family	썬키스트 패밀리	Kim Ji-hye	Park Hee-soon, Jin Kyung, Hwang Woo-seul-hye
April 3	Birthday	생일	Lee Jong-eon	Sul Kyung-gu, Jeon Do-yeon
April 3	Romang	로망	Lee Chang-geun	Lee Soon-jae, Jung Young-sook
April 11	Another Child	미성년	Kim Yoon-seok	Yum Jung-ah, Kim So-jin, Kim Hye-jun, Park Se-jin, Kim Yoon-seok
April 11	One Punch	원펀치	Park Hyun-soo	Park Shin-woo, Choi Gyu-ri, Hong Joon-gi
April 17	Watching	왓칭	Kim Sung-gi	Kang Ye-won, Lee Hak-joo, Joo Suk-tae, Im Ji-hyun, Kim No-jin
April 18	Spring Again	다시, 봄	Jung Yong-ju	Lee Chung-ah, Hong Jong-hyun, Park Kyung-hye, Park Ji-Il, Oh Hyun-joong
April 18	A Diamond in the Rough	크게 될 놈	Kang Ji-eun	Kim Hae-sook, Son Ho-jun, Nam Bo-ra, Park Won-sang
April 18	Beautiful Mind	뷰티플 마인드	Ryu Jang-ha, Son Mi	Sim Hwan, Heo Ji-yeon, Kim Geon-ho, Kim Min-joo, Kim Soo-jin
May 1	Inseparable Bros	나의 특별한 형제	Yook Sang-hyo	Shin Ha-kyun, Lee Kwang-soo, Esom
May 9	Miss & Mrs. Cops	걸캅스	Jung Da-won	Ra Mi-ran, Lee Sung-kyung, Yoon Sang-hyun
May 15	The Gangster, the Cop, the Devil	악인전	Lee Won-tae	Ma Dong-seok, Kim Mu-yeol, Kim Sung-kyu
May 16	Juror 8	배심원들	Hong Seung-wan	Moon So-ri, Park Hyung-sik
May 22	My First Client	어린 의뢰인	Jang Gyu-seong	Lee Dong-hwi, Yoo Sun
May 29	0.0MHz	0.0MHz	Yoo Sun-dong	Jung Eun-ji, Lee Sung-yeol
May 30	Parasite	기생충	Bong Joon-ho	Song Kang-ho, Lee Sun-kyun, Cho Yeo-jeong, Choi Woo-shik, Park So-dam
June 19	Long Live the King	롱 리브 더 킹: 목포 영웅	Kang Yoon-sung	Kim Rae-won, Won Jin-ah, Jin Seon-kyu, Cha Yeop
June 26	The Beast	비스트	Lee Jung-ho	Lee Sung-min, Yoo Jae-myung, Choi Daniel, Jeon Hye-jin
July 24	The King's Letters	나랏말싸미	Jo Chul-hyun	Song Kang-ho, Park Hae-il, Jeon Mi-seon
July 31	The Divine Fury	사자	Kim Joo-hwan	Park Seo-joon, Ahn Sung-ki, Woo Do-hwan
July 31	Exit	엑시트	Lee Sang-geun	Jo Jung-suk, Yoona
August 7	The Battle: Roar to Victory	봉오동 전투	Won Shin-yun	Yoo Hae-jin, Ryu Jun-yeol
August 8	My name is KIM Bok-dong	김복동	Song Won-geun	Kim Bok-dong, Han Ji-min
August 8	To Kill Alice	앨리스 죽이기	Kim Sang-kyu	Shin Eun-mi, Jung Tae-il, Hwang Sun, Oh Se-hyun
August 8	Ryeohang	려행	Im Heung-soon	Kang Yoo-jin, Kim Kyung-joo, Kim Kwang-ok, Kim Mi-kyung
August 15	Warning: Do Not Play	암전	Kim Jin-won	Seo Ye-ji, Jin Seon-kyu, Narendra Singh Dhami
August 15	Ghost Walk	밤의 문이 열린다	Yu Eun-jeong	Han Haein, Jeon Soni, Gim Sohyeon
August 21	Jesters: The Game Changers	광대들: 풍문조작단	Kim Joo-ho	Cho Jin-woong, Son Hyun-joo
August 21	Metamorphosis	변신	Kim Hong-sun	Sung Dong-il, Bae Seong-woo, Jang Young-nam, Kim Hye-joon
August 22	The House of Us	우리집	Yoon Ga-eun	Kim Na-yeon, Kim Si-a, Joo Ye-rim
August 28	Tune in for Love	유열의음악앨범	Jung Ji-woo	Kim Go-eun, Jung Hae-in
August 29	House of Hummingbird	벌새	Kim Bo-ra	Park Ji-hu, Kim Sae-byuk, Lee Seung-yeon, Jung In-gi
September 11	The Bad Guys: Reign of Chaos	나쁜 녀석들: 더 무비	Son Yong-ho	Kim Sang-joong, Ma Dong-seok, Kim Ah-joong, Kang Ye-won, Jang Ki-yong
September 11	Tazza: One Eyed Jack	타짜: 원 아이드 잭	Kwon Oh-kwang	Park Jung-min, Ryoo Seung-bum, Choi Yu-hwa, Lee Kwang-soo, Lim Ji-yeon
September 11	Cheer Up, Mr. Lee	힘을 내요, 미스터 리	Lee Gae-byok	Cha Seung-won, Park Hae-joon, Uhm Chae-young
September 25	The Battle of Jangsari	장사리 9.15	Kwak Kyung-taek, Kim Tae-hoon	Kim Myung-min, Megan Fox, Kim In-kwon, Choi Min-ho
October 2	Crazy Romance	가장 보통의 연애	Kim Han-gyul	Kim Rae-won, Gong Hyo-jin, Kang Ki-young, Jung Woong-in
October 2	Man of Men	퍼펙트맨	Yong Soo	Sul Kyung-gu, Cho Jin-woong, Kim Sa-rang, Huh Joon-ho
October 9	My Punch-Drunk Boxer	판소리 복서	Jung Hyuk-ki	Uhm Tae-goo, Lee Hye-ri, Kim Hee-won
October 9	Rainbow Playground	수상한 이웃	Lee Sang-hoon	Oh Ji-ho, Oh Kwang-rok, Son Da-som
October 16	Vertigo	버티고	Jeon Kye-soo	Chun Woo-hee, Yoo Tae-oh, Jung Jae-kwang
October 17	Love, Again	두번 할까요?	Park Yong-jib	Kwon Sang-woo, Lee Jung-hyun, Lee Jong-hyuk
October 23	Kim Ji-young: Born 1982	82년생 김지영	Kim Do-young	Jung Yu-mi, Gong Yoo
November 7	The Divine Move 2: The Wrathful	신의 한 수: 귀수편	Lee Khan	Kwon Sang-woo, Woo Do-hwan, Kim Hee-won, Kim Sung-kyun, Heo Sung-tae, Stephanie Lee
November 13	Black Money	블랙머니	Jung Ji-young	Cho Jin-woong, Lee Ha-nui, Lee Geung-young, Kang Shin-il
November 14	Moonlit Winter	윤희에게	Lim Dae-hyung	Kim Hee-ae, Yūko Nakamura, Kim So-hye
November 21	The Fault Is Not Yours	어제 일은 모두 괜찮아	Lee Seong-han	Kim Jae-cheol, Yoon Chan-young, Son Sang-yeon, Kim Min-joo
November 27	Bring Me Home	나를 찾아줘	Kim Seung-woo	Lee Young-ae, Yoo Jae-myung, Lee Won-geun, Park Hae-joon
December 18	Start-Up	시동	Choi Jeong-yeol	Ma Dong-seok, Yum Jung-ah, Park Jung-min, Jung Hae-in
December 19	Ashfall	백두산	Lee Hae-joon, Kim Byung-seo	Lee Byung-hun, Ha Jung-woo, Ma Dong-seok, Jeon Hye-jin, Bae Suzy
December 19	The Haunted House: The Sky Goblin VS Jormungandr	신비아파트 극장판 하늘도깨비 대 요르문간드	Byun Young-kyu	Jo Hyeon-jeong, Kim Young-eun, Kim Chae-ha, Shin-Woo Shin, Kim Hyeon-ji
December 26	Forbidden Dream	천문: 하늘에 묻는다	Hur Jin-ho	Han Suk-kyu, Choi Min-sik, Jeon Yeo-been
