= Lost in Starlight =

2025 South Korean animated film

- Promotional release poster
- Hangul: 이 별에 필요한
- RR: I byeore piryohan
- MR: I pyŏre p'iryohan
- Directed by: Han Ji-won
- Screenplay by: Kang Hyun-joo; Han Ji-won
- Starring: Kim Tae-ri; Hong Kyung
- Music by: Park Sung-joon
- Production company: Climax Studio
- Distributed by: Netflix
- Release date: May 30, 2025
- Running time: 96 minutes
- Country: South Korea
- Languages: Korean; English

Lost in Starlight (Korean: 이 별에 필요한; RR: I byeore piryohan) is a 2025 South Korean animated science fiction romance film directed by Han Ji-won and features the voices of Kim Tae-ri and Hong Kyung.

== Premise ==
Set in 2050, the film follows an astronaut, Nan-young, bound for Mars and a musician, Jay, with a broken dream who find hope and love in each other across the stars.

== Voice cast ==
- Kim Tae-ri (Korean) / Maitreyi Ramakrishnan (English) as Joo Nan-young, an astronaut determined to go to Mars.
  - Jang Mi as young Nan-young.
- Hong Kyung (Korean) / Justin H. Min (English) as Jay, a musician and former member of The Moles, who works as a mechanic.
- Sharon Kwon as Rosa, Nan-young's colleague and friend.
- Ahn Young-mi as Son Ji-young, Nan-young's mother and the first Korean astronaut sent to Mars, who died during the expedition.
- Kang Goo-han as Joo Yoon-jae, Nan-young's father who has spent 20 years trying to contact his wife, Ji-young, on Mars.
- Yoon A-young as Dia, the lead singer of The Moles.
- David John Robbins as:
  - Eugene, the captain of the Mars expedition.
  - Jared.

== Production ==
=== Development ===
Lost in Starlight was originally created by Han Ji-won as a music video titled "Beautiful Moments" for the Korean jewelry brand, StoneHenge. The project caught the attention of Climax Studio, who approached Han about developing the concept into a feature film. It is Han's second feature film.

Han collaborated with a character designer to craft the distinctive and lifelike visual style. The animation team used live-action reference footage of Kim Tae-ri and Hong Kyung to capture the nuance and depth of their performances. The production took five years to complete.

Kim and Hong were involved from the script development stage. Han said she wanted to encouraged them to "go beyond the storyboard to do whatever they wanted," given their natural in-person chemistry. The two actors also co-wrote the song "Life Goes On", for the film's soundtrack.

=== Casting ===
On August 16, 2023, Netflix officially announced that Kim Tae-ri and Hong Kyung would voice the main characters in Lost in Starlight. The film marks the voice acting debut for both actors. They previously co-starred in the 2023 K-drama Revenant.

To portray Nan-young, Kim studied American English to better reflect the character's professional demeanor as a space scientist.

== Release ==
Lost in Starlight was released on May 30, 2025, in select theaters and on Netflix. It is the first South Korean feature-length animated film to be released by the streaming platform.

== Reception ==
Lost in Starlight holds an audience rating of 8.49 on the Korean review aggregator Naver Movie Database, an 88% rating on Rotten Tomatoes based 16 reviews.

Acclaimed director Bong Joon-ho said of the film, "this visual masterpiece takes you around the universe."

=== Accolades ===
Award / Festival	Date of ceremony	Category	Recipient(s)	Result	Ref.
Portland Critics Association	December 31, 2025	Best Animated Feature	Lost in Starlight	Nominated	
Annie Awards	February 21, 2026	Best Independent Feature	Lost in Starlight	Nominated	
