= Jeong Nyeon =

2019–2022 South Korean webtoon

- Cover for Volume 1

정년이 Jeongnyeoni
- Author: Seo Ireh
- Illustrator: Namon
- Webtoon service: Naver Webtoon
- Original run: April 1, 2019 – May 16, 2022
- Volumes: 10

Jeong Nyeon (Korean: 정년이) is a South Korean manhwa released as a webtoon written by Seo Ireh and illustrated by Namon. It was serialized on Naver Corporation's webtoon platform, Naver Webtoon, from April 2019 to May 2022 – with the individual chapters collected and published into ten volumes. A live action adaptation, Jeongnyeon: The Star Is Born, aired in 2024 on TVN.

== Plot ==
The story takes place in 1956, three years after the Korean War, and follows Yoon Jeong-nyeon, a Mokpo girl with no money or education but a talent for singing. She joins a Gukgeuk troupe with hopes of becoming a rich and famous star.

== Media ==
=== Manhwa ===
Seo Ireh and Namon launched Jeong Nyeon in Naver's webtoon platform Naver Webtoon on April 1, 2019.

==== Volume list ====
No.	Korean release date	Korean ISBN
1	April 27, 2020	978-8-95-467142-2
2	August 31, 2020	9788954674058
3	June 7, 2021	9788954679633
4	October 11, 2021	978-8-95-468246-6
5	October 24, 2022	978-8-95-469292-2
6	March 17, 2023	978-8-95-469166-6
7	November 30, 2023	978-8-95-469696-8
8	May 31, 2024	979-1-14-160066-2
9	September 30, 2024	979-1-14-160746-3
10	September 30, 2024	979-1-14-160747-0

=== Live action adaptation ===
A live action adaptation titled Jeongnyeon: The Star Is Born was first announced in 2020 by Naver webtoon. It was directed by Jung Ji-in and written by Choi Hyo-bi, with production handled jointly by Studio N, Management MMM, and NPIO Entertainment. The show starred Kim Tae-ri as Yoon Jeong-nyeon and aired from October 12, to November 17, 2024.

=== Other media ===
The series was featured on the South Korean reality music show Webtoon Singer, premiered on the streaming service TVING on February 17, 2023, which featured K-pop artists' performances combining webtoons with extended reality technology.

== Reception ==
In 2019 the series was awarded with the Today's Our Manhwa Award by the Korean Ministry of Culture, Sports and Tourism.
