= Jeongnyeon: The Star Is Born =

2024 South Korean television series

- Promotional poster
- Hangul: 정년이
- RR: Jeongnyeoni
- MR: Chŏngnyŏni
- Based on: Jeong Nyeon by: Seo Ireh; Namon
- Written by: Choi Hyo-bi
- Directed by: Jung Ji-in
- Starring: Kim Tae-ri; Shin Ye-eun; Ra Mi-ran; Jung Eun-chae; Kim Yoon-hye
- Music by: Jang Young-kyu
- Country of origin: South Korea
- Original language: Korean
- No. of episodes: 12

Production
- Executive producer: Kim Sun-tae
- Producers: Heo Seok-won; Lee Se-hee; Park Hoon-joo
- Running time: 70 minutes
- Production companies: Studio Dragon; Studio N; Management MMM; NPIO Entertainment
- Budget: ₩33.6 billion

Original release
- Network: tvN
- Release: October 12 – November 17, 2024

Jeongnyeon: The Star Is Born (Korean: 정년이) is a 2024 South Korean television series written by Choi Hyo-bi, starring Kim Tae-ri, Shin Ye-eun, Ra Mi-ran, Jung Eun-chae, and Kim Yoon-hye. Based on a Naver webtoon of the same Korean title by Seo Ireh and Namon, it depicts the story of a girl born with a talent for singing in the 1950s. It aired on tvN every Saturday and Sunday at 21:20 (KST) from October 12 to November 17, 2024. The series is also available for streaming on Disney+ in selected regions.

== Synopsis ==
Immediately after the Korean War in the 1950s, Jeong-nyeon, a girl born with a talent for singing, entered the Yeoseong Gukgeuk troupe and grew up in it.

== Cast ==
=== Main ===
- Kim Tae-ri as Yoon Jeong-nyeon
- Shin Ye-eun as Heo Yeong-seo

A trainee and excellent at singing, dancing, and acting. She is also Jeong-yeon's rival.

- Ra Mi-ran as Kang So-bok

Director of Maeran Theater Company.

- Jung Eun-chae as Moon Ok-kyung

The prince of Maeran Theater Company and Jeong-nyeon's mentor.

- Kim Yoon-hye as Seo Hye-rang

The princess of Maeran Theater Company.

=== Supporting ===
- Woo Da-vi as Hong Joo-ran

A member of Maeran Theater Company and Yoon Jeong-nyeon's close friend.

- Seunghee as Park Cho-rok

A member of Maeran Theater Company.

- Jeong Ra-el as Seo Bok-sil

A member of Maeran Theater Company.

- Jang Hye-jin as Han Ki-joo

Heo Young-seo's mother.

- Min Kyung-ah as Heo Young-in

Heo Young-seo's older sister.

=== Special appearance ===
- Moon So-ri as Seo Yong-rye / Choi Gong-seo

Jeong-nyeon's mother who raised her child alone while putting her past as a genius singer behind her.

- Woo Mi-hwa as Jeong Nam-hee

The head of the Women's National Theater Company, "Our Sound Gugak Company".

== Production ==
=== Development ===
In 2020, according to Naver webtoon on the 18th, the series "Jeongnyeon" was going to be produced by Studio N, a subsidiary of Naver Webtoon, and is currently being planned and adapted.

In 2022, it was directed by Jung Ji-in, who directed The Red Sleeve (2021), and written by Choi Hyo-bi, the writer of the Netflix series A Time Called You (2023). The production was jointly handled by Studio N, Management MMM, and NPIO Entertainment.

=== Casting ===
On November 16, 2022, Kim Tae-ri was confirmed to take the main character Yoon Jeong-nyeon.

On August 10, 2023, Shin Ye-eun was confirmed to play Heo Yeong-seo, Ra Mi-ran was confirmed to be play Kang So-bok, and Moon So-ri was confirmed to play Seo Yong-rye. On September 6, 2024, Moon So-ri explained that she was going to cast as Yoon Jeong-nyeon's mother at Kim Tae-ri's request.

== Viewership ==
Jeongnyeon: The Star Is Born : South Korea viewers per episode (millions)

| Season | Episode number | | | | | | | | | | | | Average |
| Season | 1 | 2 | 3 | 4 | 5 | 6 | 7 | 8 | 9 | 10 | 11 | 12 | Average |
|---|---|---|---|---|---|---|---|---|---|---|---|---|---|
| 1 | 1.202 | 1.879 | 2.114 | 2.794 | 2.328 | 3.205 | 2.259 | 3.044 | 2.728 | 3.219 | 2.985 | 3.840 | 2.633 |

Source: Audience measurement performed nationwide by Nielsen Korea.

Average TV viewership ratings
| Ep. | Original broadcast date | Average audience share (Nielsen Korea) | |
| Ep. | Original broadcast date | Nationwide | Seoul |
|---|---|---|---|
| 1 | October 12, 2024 | 4.844% (1st) | 5.678% (1st) |
| 2 | October 13, 2024 | 8.216% (1st) | 8.911% (1st) |
| 3 | October 19, 2024 | 9.223% (1st) | 8.886% (1st) |
| 4 | October 20, 2024 | 12.728% (1st) | 13.578% (1st) |
| 5 | October 26, 2024 | 10.212% (1st) | 10.182% (1st) |
| 6 | October 27, 2024 | 13.383% (1st) | 13.744% (1st) |
| 7 | November 2, 2024 | 10.146% (1st) | 10.257% (1st) |
| 8 | November 3, 2024 | 12.845% (1st) | 12.952% (1st) |
| 9 | November 9, 2024 | 11.995% (1st) | 12.735% (1st) |
| 10 | November 10, 2024 | 14.058% (1st) | 14.311% (1st) |
| 11 | November 16, 2024 | 12.762% (1st) | 13.460% (1st) |
| 12 | November 17, 2024 | 16.458% (1st) | 17.090% (1st) |
| Average | | 11.319% | 12.144% |
In the table above, the blue numbers represent the lowest ratings and the red numbers represent the highest ratings.; This drama aired on a cable channel/pay TV which normally has a relatively smaller audience compared to free-to-air TV/public broadcasters (KBS, SBS, MBC, and EBS).

== Reception ==
"Jeongnyeon" premiered on October 12, 2024, receiving an initial viewership rating of 4.8%. Following its first episodes, the drama experienced a substantial increase, with ratings soaring to an average of 8.9% and reaching as high as 10.0% in the capital region right after the second episode. This remarkable rise indicates its strong audience engagement and interest in the unfolding narrative.

Despite controversies surrounding the adaptation, including character removals and scheduling issues, the drama has captivated audiences with its storytelling and performances. Kim Tae-Ri's portrayal of Yoon Jeong-Nyeon has been frequently praised for her emotional depth and singing talents, contributing significantly to the drama's appeals.

In the fifth week of October, Good Data Corporation's TV-OTT drama buzzworthiness report showed Jeongnyeon maintaining its top rank for four consecutive weeks. The series led across VON (Voice of Netizens), SNS, video categories, and even the search response survey. Moreover, its topicality score consistently rose, setting new records weekly. In TV-OTT drama performer buzzworthiness, Kim Tae-ri also held the number one spot for four consecutive weeks. For the fifth week, other cast members in the top 10 included Shin Ye-eun (3rd), Jung Eun-chae (4th), Woo Da-bi (6th), and Kim Yoon-hye (7th).

== Accolades ==
| Award ceremony | Year | Category | Nominee | Result | Ref. |
|---|---|---|---|---|---|
| APAN Star Awards | 2024 | Grand Prize (Daesang) | Kim Tae-ri | Won | |
| APAN Star Awards | 2024 | Drama of the Year | Jeongnyeon: The Star Is Born | Won | |
| APAN Star Awards | 2024 | Best Director | Jung Ji-in | Nominated | |
| APAN Star Awards | 2024 | Best Screenwriter | Choi Hyo-bi | Nominated | |
| APAN Star Awards | 2024 | Top Excellence Award, Actress in a Miniseries | Kim Tae-ri | Nominated | |
| APAN Star Awards | 2024 | Excellence Award, Actress in a Miniseries | Jung Eun-chae | Won | |
| APAN Star Awards | 2024 | Excellence Award, Actress in a Miniseries | Shin Ye-eun | Nominated | |
| Asian Television Awards | 2025 | Best Drama Series | Jeongnyeon: The Star Is Born | Pending | |
| Asian Television Awards | 2025 | Best Direction (Drama) | Jung Ji-in | Pending | |
| Baeksang Arts Awards | 2025 | Best Director | Jung Ji-in | Nominated | |
| Baeksang Arts Awards | 2025 | Best Actress | Kim Tae-ri | Won | |
| Baeksang Arts Awards | 2025 | Best Supporting Actress | Oh Gyeong-hwa | Nominated | |
| Baeksang Arts Awards | 2025 | Best Supporting Actress | Jung Eun-chae | Nominated | |
| Baeksang Arts Awards | 2025 | Best Technical Achievement | Jang Yeong-gyu (Score) | Won | |
| BANFF Rockie Award | 2025 | Best Scripted Limited Series | Jeongnyeon: The Star Is Born | Nominated | |
| Bechdel Day | 2025 | Bechdel Choice 10 | Jeongnyeon: The Star Is Born | Placed | |
| ContentAsia Awards | 2025 | Best Drama Series Made in Asia for a Regional or International Market | Jeongnyeon: The Star Is Born | Won | |
| Cable TV Broadcasting Awards | 2025 | Grand Prize (Daesang) for Drama Category | Jeongnyeon: The Star Is Born | Won | |

=== Listicles ===
Name of publisher, year listed, name of listicle, and placement
| Publisher | Year | Listicle | Placement | Ref. |
|---|---|---|---|---|
| South China Morning Post | 2024 | The 15 best K-dramas of 2024 | 10th place | |
| The New York Times | 2024 | 2024 Best International Shows | Included | |
| Time Magazine | 2024 | The 10 Best K-Dramas of 2024 | 2nd place | |
