= Alienoid: Return to the Future =

2024 film by Choi Dong-hoon

- Theatrical release poster
- Hangul: 외계+인 2부
- Lit.: Alien+Human Part 2
- RR: Oegye+in 2bu
- MR: Oegye+in 2pu
- Directed by: Choi Dong-hoon
- Written by: Choi Dong-hoon
- Produced by: Ahn Soo-hyun
- Starring: Ryu Jun-yeol; Kim Tae-ri; Kim Woo-bin; Lee Hanee; Yum Jung-ah; Jo Woo-jin; Kim Eui-sung; Jin Seon-kyu
- Cinematography: Kim Tae-kyung
- Edited by: Shin Min-kyung
- Music by: Jang Young-gyu
- Production company: Caper Film
- Distributed by: CJ Entertainment
- Release date: January 10, 2024
- Running time: 122 minutes
- Country: South Korea
- Language: Korean
- Box office: US$10.8 million

Alienoid: Return to the Future (Korean: 외계+인 2부) is a 2024 South Korean science fiction action film written and directed by Choi Dong-hoon, starring Ryu Jun-yeol, Kim Tae-ri, and Kim Woo-bin. It is the second part of 2022 film Alienoid and tells the story of humans and monks trying to save everyone by returning to the present while hidden secrets are revealed in the fierce battle for the new sword. It was released on January 10, 2024, in IMAX, 4DX, and ScreenX formats.

== Plot ==
Retrieving the Divine Sword to unlock the gate of time, Lee Ahn, trapped in the past and attempting to stop the escape of an alien prisoner locked in a human body, searches for Thunder and makes her way back to the future. In the meantime, a weird presence in Mureuk's body disturbs him. Lee Ahn and Mureuk are pursued by Heug-seol and Cheong-woon, the two mages from Samgaksan who suspect that an alien lies within Mureuk; Neung-pa, a blind swordsman who wants to take the rumored divine sword and open his eyes; and Ja-jang, who wants to claim the divine sword.

In the present day, several people are killed by a haava, an alien substance detonated by an escaped alien prisoner, The Architect, and an accidental alien witness, Min Gae-in, begins to investigate the incident. With only 48 minutes left before all the haava explodes, Lee Ahn must open the gate of time, return to the future and stop the heavy detonation. Finally, all the secrets are revealed.

== Cast ==
- Ryu Jun-yeol as Mureuk
- Kim Tae-ri as Lee Ahn
- Kim Woo-bin as Thunder
- Lee Hanee as Min Gae-in
- Yum Jung-ah as Heug-seol, a mage from Samgaksan
- Jo Woo-jin as Cheong-woon, a mage from Samgaksan
- Kim Eui-sung as Ja-jang, a masked man who wants the divine sword
- Jin Seon-kyu as Neung-pa, a blind swordsman
- Kim Hae-sook as Milbon
- Shin Jung-geun as Right King, a cat living in Mureuk's fan
- Lee Si-hoon as Left King, a cat living in Mureuk's fan
- Yoon Kyung-ho is Samsik, an alien prisoner

== Production ==
Both parts of Alienoid were shot together, filming for which began in March 2020 and concluded in April 2021 taking 387 days. The cost of production of both the parts was estimated at ₩33 billion.

== Release ==
On December 11, 2023, the main poster and 'Character Roadmap' video, were released and the film was scheduled for release on January 10, 2024, by CJ E&M. It was released in IMAX, 4DX and ScreenX formats as scheduled.

The film was released in Vietnam on January 12, Indochina on the 24, Hong Kong on the 25, and North America on the 26. It will be released in Taiwan in February 2024.

The film was featured in Features section of the 71st Sydney Film Festival on June 8, 2024.

Alienoid: Return to the Future was part of the 19th London Korean Film Festival. The festival screened Alienoid (2022) as part of their Opening Night film in the 17th edition of the festival.

== Reception ==
=== Box office ===
The film was released on January 10 on 1388 screens. It opened at first place on Korean box office with 103,467 admissions and a gross of US$746,073, and also took the first place in its first week of release with 648,687 cumulative viewers at the weekend box office. It maintained its top position at box office for continuous ten days. On January 21, the twelfth day of its release the film exceeded 1 million viewers.

As of December 31, 2024, with a gross of US$9,834,101 and 1,430,121 admissions, it is at 11th place among the Korean films released in 2024.

=== Critical response ===
On the review aggregator Rotten Tomatoes website, the film has an approval rating of 63% based on 8 reviews, with an average rating of 6/10.

Lee Yi-seul writing in Asia Economy criticised the film terming it as, "Distracted plot and contrived comedy". However Lee applauded the director Choi Dong-hoon for Korean-style Science Fiction challenge, that combines folklore with mixed likes and dislikes. She wrote, "The bold attempt would not have been possible if it weren't for the director. Jennie Kermode of Eye for Film graded the film 3/5 and wrote, "It's all wildly incoherent, and will seem all the more so if you don't have a grounding in the rules of Korean fantasy magic, but there's still plenty of fun to be had."

Douglas Davidson of Elements of Madness graded the film 4/5 and wrote, "[Brings] with it all the action, hilarity, and drama of the first film, as well as a few of the same drawbacks. However, despite the flaws, it's still a rousing good time that delivers on all it promises and more."

=== Accolades ===
Name of the award ceremony, year presented, category, nominee of the award, and the result of the nomination
Award	Year	Category	Nominee / work	Result	Ref.
Baeksang Arts Awards	2024	Best Supporting Actress	Yum Jung-ah	Nominated	
