= Alienoid =

2022 South Korean film by Choi Dong-hoon

- Theatrical release poster
- Hangul: 외계+인 1부
- Hanja: 外界+人 1部
- Lit.: Alien+Human Part 1
- RR: Oegye+in 1bu
- MR: Oegye+in 1pu
- Directed by: Choi Dong-hoon
- Written by: Choi Dong-hoon
- Produced by: Ahn Soo-hyun; Choi Dong-hoon; Kim Sung-min
- Starring: Ryu Jun-yeol; Kim Woo-bin; Kim Tae-ri; So Ji-sub; Yum Jung-ah; Jo Woo-jin; Kim Eui-sung; Lee Hanee; Shin Jung-geun
- Cinematography: Kim Tae-kyung
- Edited by: Shin Min-kyung
- Music by: Jang Young-gyu
- Production company: Caper Film
- Distributed by: CJ Entertainment
- Release date: July 20, 2022
- Running time: 142 minutes
- Country: South Korea
- Language: Korean
- Budget: US$25 million
- Box office: US$12.1 million

Alienoid (Korean: 외계+인 1부) is a 2022 South Korean science fiction action film written and directed by Choi Dong-hoon. It features an ensemble cast, including Ryu Jun-yeol, Kim Woo-bin, Kim Tae-ri, So Ji-sub, Yum Jung-ah, Jo Woo-jin, Kim Eui-sung, Lee Hanee, and Shin Jung-geun. The film depicts an extraordinary story that unfolds as the gates of time open between late Goryeo and the present in 2022, when aliens appear. It was released on July 20, 2022, in IMAX and 4DX formats. The continuation, Alienoid: Return to the Future, was released on January 10, 2024.

== Plot ==
After a short prologue, the plot moves to the modern day and then back to fantasy Goryeo, though scenes from the two time periods are interspersed.

=== Prologue: 1380 A.D. ===
In a prologue set in 1380 A.D., monk warriors attempt to defeat an alien and its human host but fail. Guard and Thunder, two humanoid robots, arrive from the future and successfully extract the alien from its host. Before dying, the former host asks Guard to take care of her baby, but he explains that they cannot interfere in human affairs. Guard and Thunder return to their home base in the modern day, but upon their return, Guard discovers that Thunder has smuggled the infant back with them.

=== Timeline 1: 2012–2022 A.D. ===
Guard raises the baby girl, Lee Ahn, without revealing his true identity (Thunder is disguised as their family SUV). Relying on her memories of Thunder talking to her when she was an infant, Lee Ahn becomes increasingly suspicious of Guard and discovers more and more of the truth about Guard, Thunder, and how she came to live with them.

Lee Ahn finds her way to Jisan Hospital, the site of an incoming alien prisoner transport. Guard and Thunder explain the mechanics of alien imprisonment: when an alien prisoner is injected into a human host, it remains confined to its host's subconscious — the human loses their memories of the implantation and does not know they are a host. The alien's consciousness can be awakened under certain circumstances, such as breathing in haava (the atmosphere of their native planet) or being cut by Guard's knife-shaped power source. Aliens can only survive in Earth's atmosphere for five minutes, after which they must either return to their original host, or move to a new host (in which case they again lose consciousness). It is hinted that the host can become aware of the prisoner even without an external mechanism, as happened in the prologue.

Shortly after the transport ship deposits its prisoners and departs, a prisoner-aligned alien ship arrives on Earth. Its pilot plans to awaken the Controller using Guard's power source, then release the concentrated haava on board the ship to transform Earth's atmosphere — this would simultaneously awaken all of Earth's alien prisoners and poison all of humanity. The pilot succeeds in awakening the Controller and releasing one sphere of haava, devastating several city blocks and awakening two other alien prisoners.

Guard, Thunder, and Lee Ahn work together to kill the alien pilot and prevent the Controller from releasing the remaining haava on board the ship. The battle leaves the three aliens, Guard, and Thunder badly wounded outside the ship, with a timer counting down to the haava release. Out of time, Lee Ahn hatches a desperate plan to travel back in time, luring the aliens back with them, then shake them off and maroon them in the past before returning to the present to stop the countdown. They execute the plan and all three aliens follow them into the past. In a final battle, Guard is destroyed, Thunder (in SUV form) sinks to the bottom of a river, and the Controller is badly wounded and forced to abandon its host.

=== Timeline 2: 1391 A.D. ===
Ten years after Thunder crash-lands in the past, a Taoist bounty hunter named Mureuk decides to pursue a huge bounty for a mystical knife called the Divine Blade, which is eventually revealed to be Guard's knife-shaped power source. Despite his unserious demeanor, Mureuk appears to have incredible talent for magic and martial arts, with an especially remarkable ability to recover from serious injuries.

While pursuing the Divine Blade through various misadventures, Mureuk meets various legendary figures of the martial arts world. Among these figures are the Monk Guru, a high-tier Taoist; the Dual Mages, a pair of inventor-mages with an arsenal of strange magical items; and Dogturd, an unremarkable figure who knows some gossip and points Mureuk in the right direction. He also meets the Girl Who Shoots Thunder, who turns out to be Lee Ahn (her "thunder" is a pistol), and Suiter and Ja-jang, the two aliens from the future who have taken over a local cult. If either Lee Ahn or the aliens obtain the Divine Blade and Thunder's location, they can return to the future and either complete or stop the haava release.

As these figures converge on the Divine Blade, they descend into a chaotic battle. Lee Ahn manages to lure one of the aliens away, while the other is defeated; Lee Ahn shakes off her pursuer while drawing closer to Thunder's location at the bottom of the river.

Near the end of the film, it becomes clear that Monk Guru, the Dual Mages, and Dogturd have something else in common that caused them to be targeted by the aliens: they were all nearby when the aliens crash-landed in the past, and are therefore candidates to be the new unconscious host of the Controller. However, unbeknownst to the aliens, there was a fifth person present: Mureuk, Monk Guru's young apprentice. Mureuk rescued Lee Ahn from the river and the Controller took him as its new host, causing him to lose his memories of the incident; the film ends on this revelation.

== Cast ==
- Ryu Jun-yeol as Mureuk, a clumsy master swordsman and Taoist who tries to acquire the Divine Blade
- Kim Woo-bin as Guard and Thunder, supernatural beings who manage and escort alien prisoners
- Kim Tae-ri as Lee Ahn, a woman who shoots thunder
  - Choi Yu-ri as young Lee Ahn
- So Ji-sub as Moon Do-seok, a detective who is chased by aliens
- Yum Jung-ah as Heug-seol, a mage from Samgaksan
- Jo Woo-jin as Cheong-woon, a mage from Samgaksan
- Kim Eui-sung as Ja-jang, a masked man who wants the divine sword
- Lee Hanee as Min Gae-in, a woman who is curious about the identity of the Guard
- Shin Jung-geun as Right King, a follower of Mureuk
- Lee Si-hoon as Left King, a follower of Mureuk
- Ji Kun-woo as Suiter, a man who appears in a modern suit in the Goryeo period
- Kim Dae-myung as Thunder (voice), a robot managing alien prisoners.
- Shim Dal-gi as bride who is replaced by Yi-an
- Yoon Byung-hee as a shaman who fights against Muruk
- Kim Ki-cheon as Dogturd, a man who knows the location of the divine sword
- Yoon Kyung-ho as a patient at Jisan Hospital
- Ok Ja-yeon as a doctor at Jisan Hospital
- Lee Seon-hee as Inn owner of Water Mist
- Yoo Jae-myung as Hyun-gam
- Kim Hae-sook as an old woman in Goryeo
- Jeon Yeo-been as Hong Eon-nyeon, a woman with an alien prisoner trapped in her body

== Production ==
=== Development and pre-production ===
The film was shot as one but released in two sequential parts. Ryu Jun-yeol and Kim Tae-ri star in both parts while So Ji-sub appears only in the first part. Due to the complexity and the length of the narrative, Choi Dong-hoon spent two and half years writing the script, pre-production took a year and 13 months went to filming. Choi revealed that while writing the script, he had specific actors in mind, and to his surprise, all of his envisioned stars accepted their roles.

While Choi Dong-hoon was in charge of screenplay and direction, Jang Young-gyu and Kim Tae-kyung were in charge of music and cinematography respectively. Yoo Sang-seop and Ryu Seong-cheol served as martial arts directors. Two art directors, Ryu Seong-hie and Lee Ha-jun, participated in the project; Ryu in charge of Goryeo setting and Lee in charge of the present day. Dexter Studio was in charge of the CG.

=== Filming ===
Filming began in March 2020. Both first and second part were filmed simultaneously for 13 months. Filming concluded in April 2021. Filming reportedly took place in Andong, North Gyeongsang Province. Production cost of making the two parts was estimated to be 40 billion won.

== Release ==
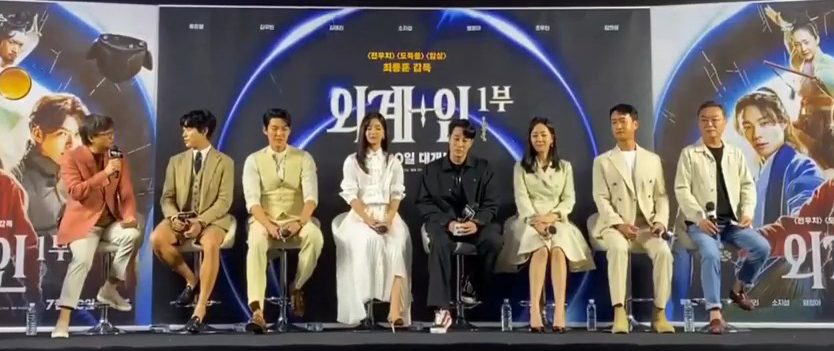
Cast and director during a showcase at Megabox COEX in June 2022.

Alienoid was released on July 20, 2022, in IMAX and 4DX formats in South Korea by CJ E&M. Well Go USA acquired North American rights to distribute the film.

The film was selected as the closing film at the 21st New York Asian Film Festival, where it was screened at Lila Acheson Wallace Auditorium, Asia Society on July 31 for its North American premiere. It was also invited to the 26th Fantasia International Film Festival and screened for its Canadian Premiere on August 1, 2022.

The film was made available for streaming on Netflix from December 28, 2022.

== Reception ==
=== Critical response ===
The film received a mixed reception from South Korean film critics; some praising the unique worldview Alienoid presented, while others pointing out the potential for confusion in terms of its characters and lore and the distraction caused by mixing too many different elements. However, many audiences seemed to appreciate the director's attempt to create something new. Alienoid was frequently compared with director Choi Dong-hoon's previous film Jeon Woo-chi: The Taoist Wizard (2009) which deals with similar concepts of Taoists and time travel.

Kim Soo-young in her review for Korea Economic Daily stated that despite it feels bit burdensome and awkward at the beginning to accept the vast worldview of two completely different times and spaces, each busy following the narrative within it, the story flows smoothly in the latter part, creating a strong sense of immersion. Jo Hyun-na of Cine21 wrote that the characters, settings and production designs such as space ships lacked novelty, but praised the performance of actors. Choi Young-joo writing for No Cut News praised the director for his ability to combine different genres calling it "a challenge that should be taken at least once" though it seems excessive at times. My Daily's Kim Nara wrote that despite having powerful cast, the film did not meet expectations of the audience, and the director Choi Dong-hoon's own distinct color which was shown in his previous works is rarely seen in Alienoid. Won Jong-bin of Oh My News called the film "disappointing" in terms of film's rhythm, characters, narrative, and setting, but praised the performance of actors, especially those who played characters in Goryeo Dynasty. Kim Boram writing for Yonhap News Agency praised the performance of Ryu Jun-yeol, Kim Woo-bin and Kim Tae-ri, but stated that the story seems "cut and dried."

=== Box office ===
The film was released on 1959 screens on July 20, 2022. The opening recorded 158,162 admissions and topped the South Korean box office. The film surpassed 1 million admissions in 7 days of release. As of September 26, 2022, it is the 9th highest-grossing Korean film of 2022 with gross of US$11.2 million and 1.5 million admissions according to the Korean Film Council.

The film became a box-office failure, due to high production cost which required about 7 million (South Korean) admissions to cross the break-even point.

== Sequel ==
In June 2022, while promoting Alienoid Choi Dong-hoon hinted "While Part 1 follows characters in the present-day era who go back in time to the Goryeo Kingdom, Alienoid: Return to the Future will center on ancient Taoists traveling through time and space in an effort to obtain the divine sword." The second installment was released on January 10, 2024.

== Accolades ==
Award	Year	Category	Recipient(s)	Result	Ref.
Baeksang Arts Awards	2023	Best Supporting Actress – Film	Yum Jung-ah	Nominated	
Bechdel Day	2023	Bechdel Choice 10 — Film	Alienoid	Top 10	
Blue Dragon Film Awards	2022	Technical Award	Jegal Seung	Nominated	
Buil Film Awards	2022	Best Supporting Actress	Yum Jung-ah	Nominated	
Buil Film Awards	2022	Best Music	Jang Young-gyu	Nominated	
Chunsa Film Art Awards	2022	Technical Award (VFX)	Je Gal-seung, Park Jae-hyun	Nominated	
Director's Cut Awards	2023	Best Director in film	Choi Dong-hoon	Nominated	
Grand Bell Awards	2022	Best Art Direction	Ryu Seong-hui, Lee Ha-jun	Won	
Grand Bell Awards	2022	Best Visual Effects	Je Gal-seung	Won	
Grand Bell Awards	2022	Best Film Editing	Shin Min-kyung	Nominated	
Grand Bell Awards	2022	Best Costume Design	Jo Sang-kyung	Nominated	
Grand Bell Awards	2022	Best Music	Jang Young-gyu	Nominated	
