= No Tomorrow (2016 film) =

- Theatrical release poster
- Directed by: Lee Ji-seung
- Screenplay by: Jang Jae-il, Lee Ji-seung
- Produced by: Han Dong-hwan, Lee Ji-seung, Ryu Sung-jin
- Starring: Park Hyo-joo; Bae Sung-woo; Lee Hyun-wook; Ryu Jun-yeol
- Distributed by: Contents Panda
- Release date: 30 March 2016
- Running time: 88 minutes
- Country: South Korea
- Language: Korean

No Tomorrow (Korean: 섬. 사라진 사람들; RR: Seom. sarajin saramdeul) is a 2016 South Korean film starring Park Hyo-joo and Lee Hyun-wook. The story is loosely based on the 2014 Salt Farm Slavery Incident in the island county of Sinan in South Jeolla Province, in which disabled men were sold as laborers, forced to work without pay, and beaten if they didn't work hard enough; other islanders were complicit in helping the slavers find victims who tried to escape. The real-life investigation was spurred by a letter from one of the victims. In the film, an independent investigator and a cameraman try to unravel the mystery after receiving a tip from an informant. A quote from Bernard Shaw appears in the closing credits: "The worst sin towards our fellow creatures is not to hate them, but to be indifferent to them."

== Plot ==
An informant contacts journalist Lee Hye-ri (Park) to report that laborers at a salt farm, who have cognitive disabilities, have actually been enslaved. She and cameraman Jo Suk-hoon (Lee) disguise themselves as documentary filmmakers who are interested in salt harvesting and go to the island where the farm is located. They question the local residents but find them secretive and distrustful. As the pair continues to ask questions, a violent attack occurs in which four people end up dead; the salt farm owner (Choi Il-hwa) and his son (Ryu) go missing along with one worker, while Hye-ri is severely injured and ends up in a coma. Detective Choi (Choi Gwi-hwa) and an investigative police officer (Bae Yu-ram) pick up the case.

== Cast ==
- Park Hyo-joo as Lee Hye-ri
- Bae Sung-woo as Sang-ho
- Lee Hyun-wook as Jo Suk-hoon
- Ryu Jun-yeol as Ji-hoon
- Choi Il-hwa as Sung-goo
- Choi Gwi-hwa as Detective Choi
- Keum Dong-hyun as Hyoo-joong
- Lee Sung-wook as Jae-hee
- Bae Yu-ram as the police officer
- Son Young-soon as the grandmother

== Release and reception ==
No Tomorrow was released on March 30, 2016 at 206 theaters around South Korea. It grossed $106,019 at the South Korea box office.
