= The Old Garden =

- Theatrical release poster
- Hangul: 오래된 정원
- Hanja: 오래된 庭園
- RR: Oraedoen jeongwon
- MR: Oraedoen chŏngwŏn
- Directed by: Im Sang-soo
- Written by: Im Sang-soo
- Based on: The Old Garden by Hwang Sok-yong
- Produced by: Park Jong; Kim Jeong-ho
- Starring: Yum Jung-ah; Ji Jin-hee
- Cinematography: Kim Woo-hyung
- Edited by: Lee Eun-soo
- Music by: Kim Hong-jib
- Production company: MBC C&I
- Distributed by: Lotte Entertainment
- Release dates: September 24, 2006 (San Sebastián Film Festival); January 4, 2007 (South Korea)
- Running time: 112 minutes
- Country: South Korea
- Language: Korean
- Budget: US$3,500,000
- Box office: US$1,577,570

The Old Garden (Korean: 오래된 정원) is a 2006 South Korean romantic drama film, based on the best-selling novel of the same name by the author Hwang Sok-yong. It was written and directed by Im Sang-soo, and starring Yum Jung-ah and Ji Jin-hee.

The plot of the film involves a couple during the turbulent political landscape in early 1980s South Korea, and the events surrounding the Gwangju Massacre.

== Plot ==
Hyun-woo (Ji Jin-hee) is released after 17 years in prison. During his college days he was involved in the student-led anti-government protests that swept Korea in the early 1980s. Hyun-woo travels back to the town where he spent a few months immediately prior to his arrest.

Seventeen years earlier, Hyun-woo fled to a rural area, hiding from authorities trying to quash his anti-government group. He found sanctuary at the home of Han Yun-hee (Yum Jung-ah). Once a sympathizer to the anti-government cause, she now lives a modest life as a teacher in a small rural community. The couple quickly grow intimate, with Hyun-woo offering the spark missing from Yun-hee's simple life.

While Hyun-woo is in hiding at Yun-hee's home, he learns that most of his fellow anti-government protesters are imprisoned. Though he is high on the government's wanted list, he feels ashamed for living peacefully while his friends are imprisoned. Thus, he makes the difficult decision to leave Yun-hee and go back to the movement centered in Seoul.

What he later learns is that he left behind the sole person who would stay faithful to him throughout his 17-year imprisonment and also Yun-hee, who is carrying his baby.

== Cast ==
- Yum Jung-ah as Han Yun-hee
- Ji Jin-hee as Oh Hyun-woo
- Youn Yuh-jung as Hyun-woo's mother
- Lee Soo-mi as Soo-mi

== Awards and nominations ==
2007 Baeksang Arts Awards

- Best Actress - Yum Jung-ah

2008 Asian Film Awards

- Nomination – Best Screenplay - Im Sang-soo
- Nomination – Best Editing - Lee Eun-soo
