= Hit-and-Run Squad =

South Korean action police procedural film

- Promotional poster
- Hangul: 뺑반
- RR: Ppaengban
- MR: Ppaengban
- Directed by: Han Jun-hee
- Written by: Han Jun-hee; Kim Kyung-chan
- Produced by: Lee Jung-eun; Lee Min-soo; Kwon So-eun; Kim Do-soo
- Starring: Gong Hyo-jin; Ryu Jun-yeol; Jo Jung-suk; Yum Jung-ah; Jeon Hye-jin; Son Suk-ku; Kim Ki-bum
- Cinematography: Kim Tae-kyung
- Production companies: Showbox; Hodu&U Entertainment
- Distributed by: Showbox
- Release date: January 30, 2019
- Running time: 133 minutes
- Country: South Korea
- Language: Korean
- Box office: US$13.5 million

Hit-and-Run Squad is a 2019 South Korean action crime film directed by Han Jun-hee, starring Gong Hyo-jin, Ryu Jun-yeol, Jo Jung-suk, Yum Jung-ah, and Jeon Hye-jin. The film was released on January 30, 2019.

== Plot ==
Inspector Eun Si-yeon, a top officer in the elite Internal Affairs Division, finds herself demoted to the hit-and-run squad after being accused of conducting an aggressive and coercive investigation. Once a trusted ally of Chief Yoon, Si-yeon now joins a small, unconventional team led by the pregnant Chief Woo, a brilliant police academy graduate, and ace detective Seo Min-jae, whose instincts for cars are unmatched.

Despite limited resources and lack of additional manpower, the hit-and-run squad is the best at solving these cases. As Si-yeon settles into her new role, she uncovers a disturbing connection. Her prime target, former F1 racer and businessman Jung Jae-chul, is also the key suspect in the squad's latest unsolved hit-and-run case.

Si-yeon and Min-jae, driven by a singular goal, team up to bring Jae-chul to justice. But Jae-chul, an uncontrollable speed freak with a taste for corruption, is determined to evade capture by any means necessary. As the squad closes in, he becomes even more reckless, launching a daring counterattack.

== Cast ==
- Gong Hyo-jin as Eun Si-yeon
- Ryu Jun-yeol as Seo Min-jae
- Jo Jung-suk as Jung Jae-cheol
- Yum Jung-ah as Yoon Ji-hyun
- Jeon Hye-jin as Woo Sun-young
- Son Suk-ku as Ki Tae-ho
- Key as Dong-soo
- Lee Sung-min as Min-jae's adoptive father
- Lee Hak-joo as Ga Reu-ma
- Park Hyung-soo as Choi Kyung-joon
- Ryu Kyung-soo as a traffic policeman.
- Kim Go-eun as Min-jae's acquaintance

== Production ==
Lee Je-hoon was initially offered a lead role but had declined the offer.

The first script reading took place on the March 5 and filming began on March 11, 2018.

== Awards and nominations ==
Awards	Category	Recipient	Result	Ref.
55th Baeksang Arts Awards	Best New Actor	Son Suk-ku	Nominated	
