= Moon Young =

- Theatrical poster
- Hangul: 문영
- RR: Munyeong
- MR: Munyŏng
- Directed by: Kim So-yeon
- Written by: Kim So-yeon
- Starring: Kim Tae-ri
- Cinematography: Jung Young-sam
- Edited by: Han Mi-yeon; Won Chang-jae
- Music by: K.AFKA
- Distributed by: KT&G Sangsangmadang
- Release dates: November 27, 2015 (SIFF); January 12, 2017
- Running time: 43 minutes (film festival); 64 minutes (theatrical)
- Country: South Korea
- Languages: Korean; Korean Sign Language
- Box office: US$56,363

Moon Young (Korean: 문영) is a 2015 South Korean drama film written and directed by Kim So-yeon and starring Kim Tae-ri.

== Cast ==
- Kim Tae-ri as Moon-young
- Jung Hyun as Hee-soo
- Park Wan-gyu as Father
- Park Jung-sik as Kwon Hyuk-chul
- Jang Hyang-sook as Middle-Aged Woman 1
- Heo Won-jeong as Middle-Aged Woman 2
- Nam Bo-ra as Yeong-eun
- Lee Jin-kyeong as Teacher

== Release ==
Filmed in February 2013, Moon Young debuted as a short film at the Seoul Independent Film Festival in 2015, approximately 43 minutes in length.

An expanded version of the film, with a runtime of 64 minutes, was theatrically released on January 12, 2017.
