= Revenant (TV series) =

2023 South Korean television series

- Promotional poster
- Hangul: 악귀
- Hanja: 惡鬼
- Lit.: Evil Spirit
- RR: Akgwi
- MR: Akkwi
- Genre: Mystery; Thriller; Horror
- Developed by: Lee Ok-gyu (planning)
- Written by: Kim Eun-hee
- Directed by: Lee Jung-rim; Kim Jae-hong
- Starring: Kim Tae-ri; Oh Jung-se; Hong Kyung
- Music by: Movie Closer
- Country of origin: South Korea
- Original language: Korean
- No. of episodes: 12

Production
- Executive producer: Lee Ok-gyu
- Producers: Kim Eun-hye; Kwon Ryeong-ah; Ko Jin-hyeok
- Production companies: Studio S; B.A. Entertainment

Original release
- Network: SBS TV
- Release: June 23 – July 29, 2023

Revenant (Korean: 악귀) is a 2023 South Korean television series written by Kim Eun-hee and starring Kim Tae-ri, Oh Jung-se, and Hong Kyung. It aired from June 23 to July 29, 2023, on SBS TV's Fridays and Saturdays at 22:00 (KST). It is also available for streaming on Disney+ in selected regions.

== Synopsis ==
The series revolves around a young woman possessed by an entity and a professor of folklore who can see ghosts. Together they seek the truth behind mysterious suicides surrounding the city.

== Cast ==
=== Main ===
- Kim Tae-ri as Gu San-yeong

A public prosecutor who has been preparing for the 9th-grade civil service exam. She gets entangled in mysterious deaths, after receiving her late father's belongings.

- Oh Jung-se as Yeom Hae-sang
  - Ham Sung-min as young Yeom Hae-sang

A folklore professor from a wealthy family. He has the ability to see spirits and gods.

- Hong Kyung as Lee Hong-sae

A lieutenant in the Seoul Metropolitan Government's Violent Crime Investigation Unit.

=== Supporting ===
- Kim Hae-sook as Na Byung-hee

Yeom Hae-sang's grandmother and CEO of Joonghyun Capital.

- Park Ji-young as Yoon Gyeong-moon

Gu San-yeong's mother.

- Kim Won-hae as Seo Mun-chun

Lee Hong-sae's partner.

- Yang Hye-ji as Baek Se-mi

Gu San-yeong's high school classmate who is preparing for the civil service exam.

- Lee Kyu-hoe as Kim Chi-won

Na Byung-hee's closest aide and vice president of Joonghyun Capital.

- Jin Seon-kyu as Gu Kang-mo

Gu San-yeong's father and a former folklore professor.

=== Others ===
- Ye Soo-jung as Kim Seok-ran

Gu San-yeong's paternal grandmother.

- Kim Shin-bi as Kim Woo-jin

Yeom Hae-sang's housemate.

- Lee Ji-won as Yoon-jeong

San-yeong's high school classmate.

=== Special appearances ===
- Kim Sung-kyu as voice phishing criminal
- Park Hyo-joo as Yeom Hae-sang's mother
- Lee Jae-won as Yeom Jae-woo, Hae-sang's father
- Oh Yeon-ah as Choi Man-wol
- Pyo Ye-jin as an influencer
- Moon Sook as Funeral attendee
- Cho Hyun-chul as Shaman
- Choi Gwi-hwa as Chun Il-man
- Kang Gil-woo as Yeom Seung-ok
- Park So-yi as Lee Mok-dan
- Shim Dal-gi as Lee Hyang-yi, Mok-dan's older sister, a demon who possessed San-yeong.
- Lee Yoo-jun as Jung Han-ki

A forensic scientist and retired member of the Seoul Cold Case Squad. Assists in reconstructing documents and briefly discusses with Seo Mun-chun about his deceased colleague Gye-chul from the Cold Case Squad (who was also played by Kim Won-hae).

== Reception ==
=== Viewership ===
Revenant : South Korea viewers per episode (millions)

| Season | Episode number | | | | | | | | | | | | Average |
| Season | 1 | 2 | 3 | 4 | 5 | 6 | 7 | 8 | 9 | 10 | 11 | 12 | Average |
|---|---|---|---|---|---|---|---|---|---|---|---|---|---|
| 1 | 1.767 | 1.896 | 2.024 | 1.835 | 1.888 | 2.000 | 1.952 | 2.025 | 1.859 | 2.109 | 2.107 | 2.302 | 1.980 |

Source: Audience measurement performed nationwide by Nielsen Korea.

Average TV viewership ratings
| Ep. | Original broadcast date | Average audience share | | |
| Ep. | Original broadcast date | Nielsen Korea | | TNmS |
| Ep. | Original broadcast date | Nationwide | Seoul | Nationwide |
|---|---|---|---|---|
| 1 | June 23, 2023 | 9.9% (3rd) | 10.8% (1st) | 8.0% (4th) |
| 2 | June 24, 2023 | 10.0% (2nd) | 10.8% (2nd) | N/A |
| 3 | June 30, 2023 | 11.0% (2nd) | 11.9% (1st) | 8.7% (4th) |
| 4 | July 1, 2023 | 10.0% (2nd) | 10.8% (2nd) | 8.4% (2nd) |
| 5 | July 7, 2023 | 10.8% (3rd) | 12.2% (1st) | 8.0% (4th) |
| 6 | July 8, 2023 | 9.5% (2nd) | 10.2% (2nd) | 7.9% (2nd) |
| 7 | July 14, 2023 | 10.6% (3rd) | 11.0% (2nd) | 9.1% (4th) |
| 8 | July 15, 2023 | 10.4% (2nd) | 11.1% (2nd) | 7.9% (2nd) |
| 9 | July 21, 2023 | 10.3% (2nd) | 11.1% (2nd) | 7.4% (6th) |
| 10 | July 22, 2023 | 10.9% (2nd) | 12.0% (2nd) | 8.5% (2nd) |
| 11 | July 28, 2023 | 10.3% (2nd) | 10.8% (1st) | 7.8% (3rd) |
| 12 | July 29, 2023 | 11.2% (2nd) | 12.0% (2nd) | 8.0% (2nd) |
| Average | | 10.4% | 11.2% | — (Note: Due to some ratings not recorded, the exact average rating is unknown.) |
In the table above, the blue numbers represent the lowest ratings and the red numbers represent the highest ratings.; N/A denotes ratings that were not published.

=== Accolades ===
Name of the award ceremony, year presented, category, nominee of the award, and the result of the nomination
| Award ceremony | Year | Category | Nominee / Work | Result | Ref. |
|---|---|---|---|---|---|
| Baeksang Arts Awards | 2024 | Best Drama | Revenant | Nominated | |
| Baeksang Arts Awards | 2024 | Best Screenplay | Kim Eun-hee | Nominated | |
| Baeksang Arts Awards | 2024 | Technical Award | Yang Ho-sam, Park Ji-won (Art direction) | Nominated | |
| Korea Drama Awards | 2023 | Top Excellence Award, Actor | Oh Jung-se | Won | |
| New York Festival TV & Film Awards | 2024 | Scifi/Fantasy/Horror | Revenant | Won (Note: Bronze Award) | |
| SBS Drama Awards | 2023 | Grand Prize (Daesang) | Kim Tae-ri | Won | |
| SBS Drama Awards | 2023 | Excellence Award, Actor in a Miniseries Genre/Action Drama | Hong Kyung | Won | |
| SBS Drama Awards | 2023 | Best Supporting Performance in a Miniseries Genre/Action Drama | Kim Won-hae | Won | |
| SBS Drama Awards | 2023 | Best New Actress | Yang Hye-ji | Won | |
| SBS Drama Awards | 2023 | Best Young Actress | Park So-yi | Won | |
| SBS Drama Awards | 2023 | Best Performance | Jin Seon-kyu | Won | |
| SBS Drama Awards | 2023 | Top Excellence Award, Actor in a Miniseries Genre/Action Drama | Oh Jung-se | Nominated | |
| SBS Drama Awards | 2023 | Top Excellence Award, Actress in a Miniseries Genre/Action Drama | Kim Tae-ri | Nominated | |
| SBS Drama Awards | 2023 | Scene Stealer Award | Shim Dal-gi | Nominated | |
| SBS Drama Awards | 2023 | Best Supporting Performance in a Miniseries Genre/Action Drama | Kim Hae-sook | Nominated | |
| SBS Drama Awards | 2023 | Best Supporting Performance in a Miniseries Genre/Action Drama | Park Ji-young | Nominated | |
| Seoul International Drama Awards | 2024 | Outstanding Korean Actress | Kim Tae-ri | Nominated | |
| WorldFest-Houston International Film Festival | 2024 | Feature Made for Television/Cable | Revenant | Won (Note: Gold Remi Award) | |
