= Ryu Jun-yeol =

South Korean actor (born 1986)

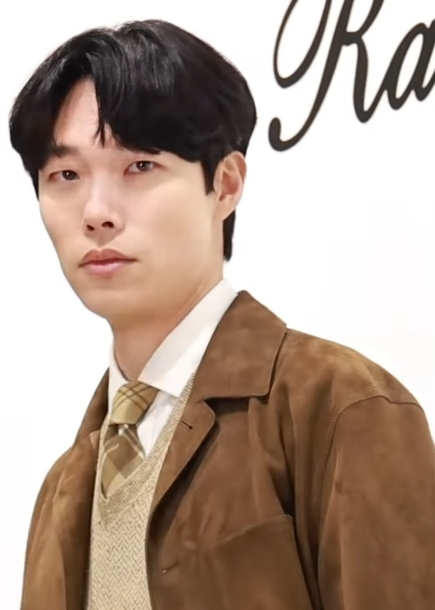
- Ryu in 2024
- Born: September 25, 1986 (age 40); Suwon, South Korea
- Education: University of Suwon (Film)
- Occupations: Actor; photographer
- Years active: 2012–present
- Agent: United Artists Agency

Korean name
- Hangul: 류준열
- Hanja: 柳俊烈
- RR: Ryu Junyeol
- MR: Ryu Chunyŏl

Ryu Jun-yeol (Korean: 류준열; born September 25, 1986) is a South Korean actor. Ryu began his acting career in independent films like Socialphobia (2015) prior to being known through the television series Reply 1988 (2015–2016) which won him the Baeksang Arts Award for Best New Actor. He then starred in the films The King (2017), A Taxi Driver (2017), Believer (2018), The Battle: Roar to Victory (2019), and The Night Owl (2022). He also gained attention for his work in the two-part action blockbuster films Alienoid (2022) and Alienoid: Return to the Future (2024), as well as the series The 8 Show (2022). Ryu has received numerous accolades and has been included in the Forbes Korea Power Celebrity list for three consecutive years: 14th in 2017, 36th in 2018, and 11th in 2019.

== Early life and education ==
Ryu was born on September 25, 1986, in Suwon, South Korea. He is the eldest and has a sister who is two years his junior. He graduated from University of Suwon majoring in film on a scholarship. While studying at the university, Ryu took many part-time jobs, working as an after-school teacher for elementary students, a pizza delivery person, a day labourer, and more. Ryu was conscripted before debuting as an actor. He registered as a public officer in 2007 and completed his duties in 2009.

== Career ==
=== 2012–2014: Beginnings ===
In 2012, Ryu started acting in short and independent films, before being cast in a bit part in the 2013 feature film INGtoogi: The Battle of Internet Trolls.

=== 2015–2017: Reply 1988 and breakthrough ===
Ryu first drew attention for his performance in his debut feature film, Socialphobia in 2015, which earned him a Rising Star Award at KAFA Film Festival and nominations from Chunsa Film Art Awards. Later that year, Ryu gained widespread public recognition through starring in the family drama Reply 1988, alongside Lee Hye-ri, Park Bo-gum, Go Kyung-pyo, and Lee Dong-hwi. His performance won him many accolades, including the Best New Actor in TV Award at the 52nd Baeksang Arts Awards in 2016.

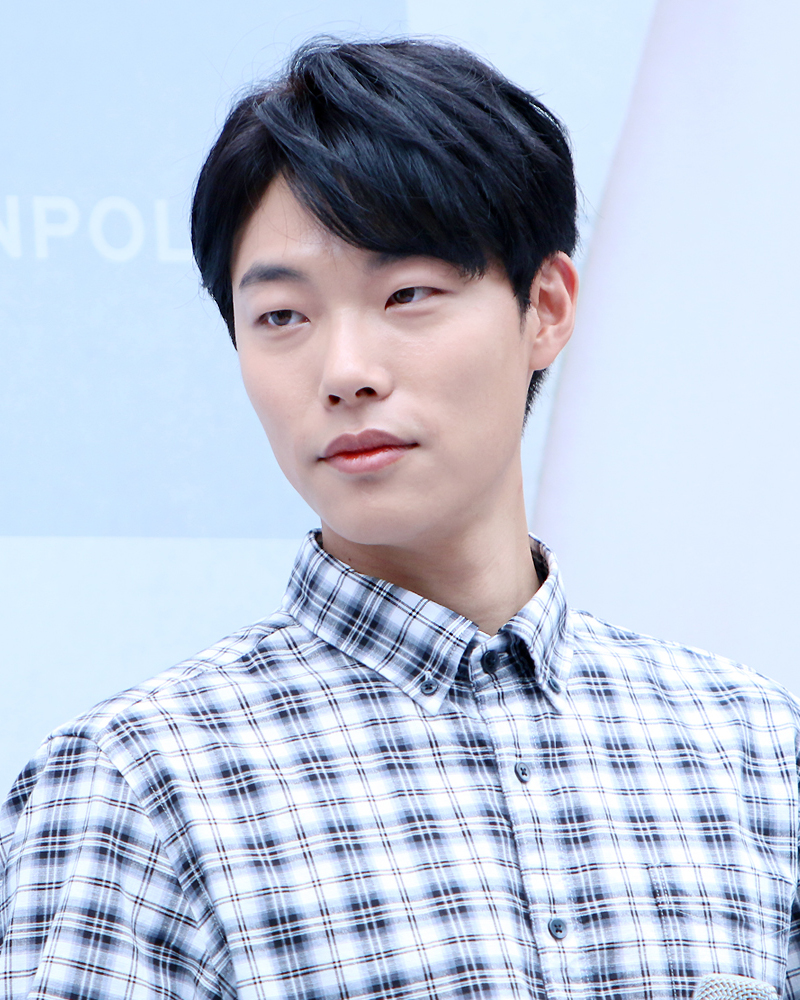
Ryu in 2016

In 2016, Ryu starred in the coming-of-age film One Way Trip and crime thriller No Tomorrow. The same year, he played his first leading role in romantic-comedy Lucky Romance alongside Hwang Jung-eum. In 2017, Ryu featured in political crime drama film The King alongside Zo In-sung and Jung Woo-sung, which became the 7th highest-grossing South Korean film of the year and for which he won the Best New Actor in Film award at the 53rd Baeksang Arts Awards. The same year, he featured in biopic film A Taxi Driver with actors Song Kang-ho and Yoo Hae-jin, which became the highest grossing Korean film of the year and the twelfth highest-grossing South Korean film in history. Ryu also appeared in legal thriller film Heart Blackened alongside Choi Min-sik and Park Shin-hye.

=== 2018–present: Work in film and streaming media ===
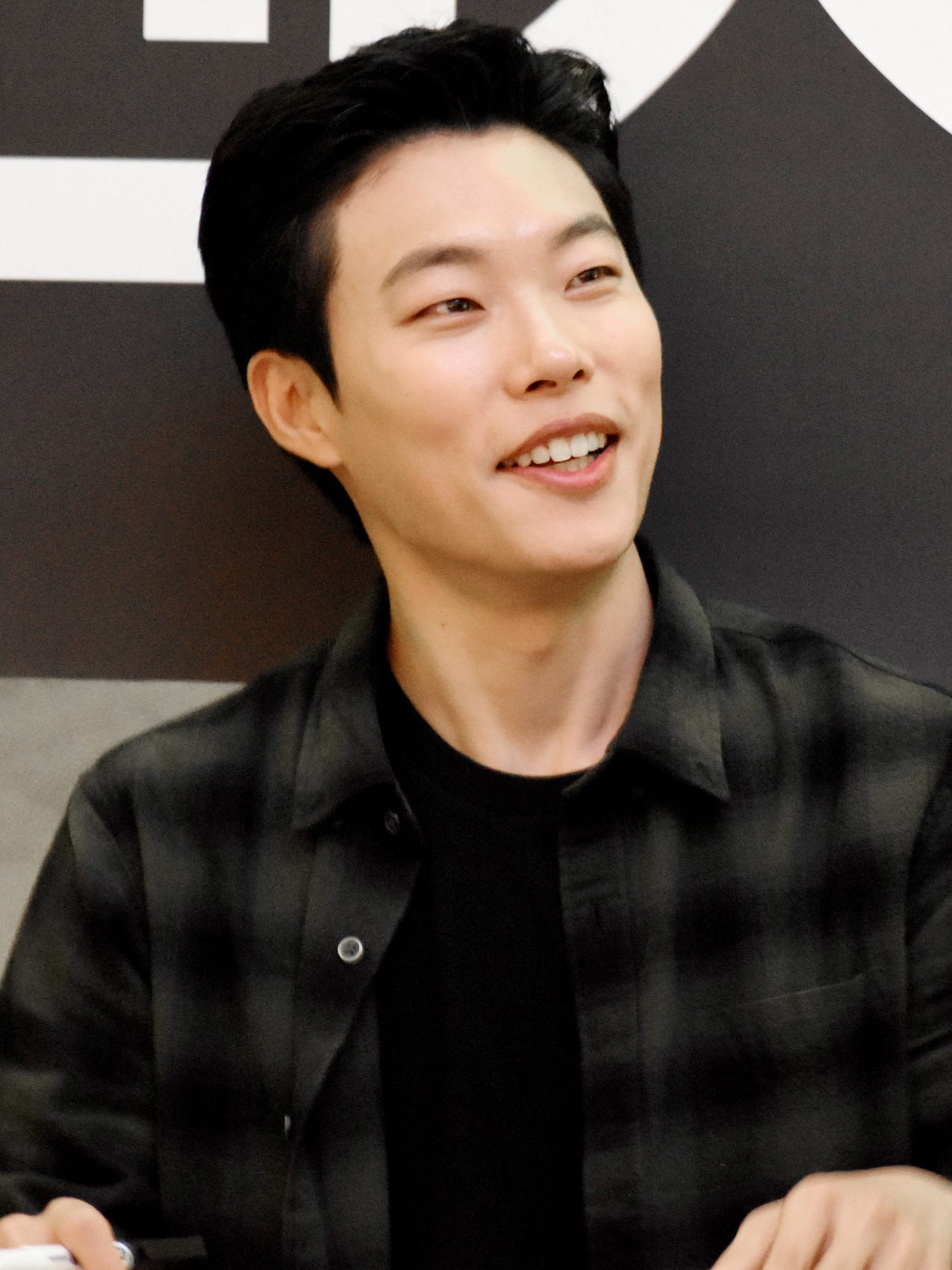
Ryu in 2018

In 2018, Ryu starred in the acclaimed drama film Little Forest with Kim Tae-ri, and headlined the crime action film Believer with Cho Jin-woong . Believer was a box-office hit, becoming the first Korean film to surpass five million admissions in 2018. It was the fourth highest-grossing film of the year in South Korea. In 2019, Ryu starred in the action thriller film Hit-and-Run Squad with Gong Hyo-jin directed by Han Jun-hee, led the crime film Money alongside Yoo Ji-tae and historical action film The Battle: Roar to Victory directed by Won Shin-yun. All three films performed well at the box-office, with The Battle: Roar to Victory and Money eventually becoming the 5th and 9th highest grossing Korean films of the year respectively. Ryu's film work earned him a spot in Forbes Korea Power Celebrity for two consecutive years, 36th in 2018 and 11th in 2019.

In 2021, Ryu starred in JTBC's "Tenth Anniversary Special Project", a Hur Jin-ho melodrama television series Lost with Jeon Do-yeon, marking his small screen comeback after five years. In 2022, Ryu headlined Choi Dong-hoon's sci-fi action fantasy film, Alienoid, reuniting with Kim Tae-ri. The film premiered in July 2022. Despite the film not being a commercial success, Ryu's performance was praised by critics. In November, Ryu starred in the historical-thriller film The Night Owl, reuniting with Yoo Hae-jin. In 2024, Ryu starred in psychological thriller Netflix series The 8 Show along with actress Chun Woo-hee and actor Park Jeong-min, reuniting second work with the director Han Jae-rim. Ryu starred in the mystery thriller film Revelations with actress Shin Hyun-been and directed by Yeon Sang-ho. In May 2025, Netflix announced that Ryu will be one of the main characters of the new drama Mousetrap, co-starring Sul Kyung-gu. In June, Ryu signed an exclusive contract with United Artists Agency (UAA).

== Other ventures ==
=== Philanthropy ===
While filming Youth Over Flowers: Africa in 2016, Ryu developed an interest in environmentalism and began to campaign for environmental protection. In December 2018, Ryu was reported to have donated ₩10 million to Greenpeace. He has been making regular donations since 2016 for various campaigns, such as Save the Arctic. In 2020, Ryu made another donation to Greenpeace in response to Australian wildfires, and campaigned for animal protection and urgent action to tackle climate change on his Instagram account. In 2021, Ryu participated in a video conference with South Korean President Moon Jae-in, speaking about environmental protection and bringing attention to the Greenpeace campaign to reduce plastic packaging. The two had previously visited the DMZ Peace Trail in 2019 to mark the first anniversary of the Panmunjom Declaration.

=== Photography ===
Ryu took a brief hiatus from acting and moved to the United States, living in Los Angeles for several months from mid-2019 to early 2020, going by his English name Anthony. He attended the University of California, Los Angeles for a study abroad programme. Additionally, he did photography work and learned vlogging in his spare time. He established a mini vlog-series on YouTube, titled Ryu Jun-yeol's: Reportage (Korean: '류준열의 르포르타쥬'), which covered his life in Los Angeles. In November 2020, Ryu held his first photo exhibition in Seoul, titled "Once Upon A Time... In Hollywood", which showcased the photos he took while living abroad.

== Personal life ==
Ryu was in a relationship with Reply 1988 co-star Lee Hye-ri from late 2016 to November 2023. He briefly dated actress Han So-hee in 2024.

An avid football fan, Ryu has participated in promotional activities for the 2017 FIFA U-20 World Cup, which was held in South Korea. Ahead of the tournament, Ryu played against Argentine football players Diego Maradona and Pablo Aimar in a five-a-side match held before the official U-20 World Cup draw in Suwon.

== Filmography ==
=== Film ===
Year	Title	Role	Notes	Ref.
2012	Nowhere	A boyfriend	Short film	
2013	INGtoogi: The Battle of Internet Trolls	Gym man	Bit part	
2014	Midnight Sun	Yong-hoon	Short film	
2014	One-minded	Club Dude	Short film	
2014	People in a Hurry	Jae-hyun	Short film	
2014	Economic Love	Ji-hoon	Short film	
2014	Son Na-rae Rescue Operation	Hyun-woo	Short film	
2015	Draw	Sang-hoon	Short film	
2015	Socialphobia	Yang-ge		
2016	Sori: Voice from the Heart	Seedless strawberry		
2016	No Tomorrow	Ji-hoon		
2016	One Way Trip	Ji-gong		
2016	Canola	Cheol-heon		
2016	The Boys Who Cried Wolf	Dong-chul		
2017	The King	Choi Doo-il		
2017	A Taxi Driver	Goo Jae-sik		
2017	Heart Blackened	Kim Dong-myeong		
2018	Little Forest	Jae-ha		
2018	Believer	Seo Young-rak		
2019	Hit-and-Run Squad	Seo Min-jae		
2019	Money	Jo Il-hyun		
2019	The Battle: Roar to Victory	Lee Jang-ha		
2022	Alienoid	Mureuk		
2022	The Night Owl	Kyung-soo		
2024	Alienoid: Return to the Future	Mureuk		
2025	Revelations	Seong Min-chan		

=== Television series ===
Year	Title	Role	Notes	Ref.
2015	The Producers	Joo Jong-hyun	Cameo (Ep. 1–2)	
2015–2016	Reply 1988	Kim Jung-hwan		
2016	Lucky Romance	Jae Su-ho		
2021	Lost	Lee Kang-jae		
2024	The 8 Show	Bae Jin-su / Third Floor		
2026	Mousetrap	Je Moon-jae		

=== Television shows ===
Year	Title	Role	Ref.
2016	Youth Over Flowers: Africa	Cast member	
2019	Traveler	Cast member	
2025–26	Reply 1988 10th Anniversary	Special appearance (Ep. 1)	

=== Hosting ===
Year	Title	Notes	Ref.
2022	27th Busan International Film Festival Opening Ceremony	with Jeon Yeo-been	
2024	9th Asia Artist Awards	with Sung Han-bin and Jang Won-young	

=== Music videos ===
Year	Title	Ref.
2025	"Hyehwa-dong (or Ssangmun-dong)"	

=== Music video appearances ===
Year	Song title	Artist	Ref.
2014	"Still I'm by Your Side"	Clazziquai Project	
2015	"A Little Girl" (소녀)	Oh Hyuk	

== Discography ==
=== Singles ===
Title	Year	Album	Ref.
"You" (어떻게)	2017	Mixxxture Project, Vol. 2	
"Hyehwa-dong (or Ssangmun-dong) (혜화동 (혹은 쌍문동))" (Ssangmun-dong Kids featuring Ryu Jun-yeol)	2025	Reply 1988 10th Anniversary OST	

== Accolades ==
=== Awards and nominations ===
Name of the award ceremony, year presented, category, nominee of the award, and the result of the nomination
Award ceremony	Year	Category	Nominee / Work	Result	Ref.
Asia Artist Awards	2016	Best Rookie Award, Actor	Reply 1988	Won	
Asia Artist Awards	2017	Best Star Award – Actor	A Taxi Driver	Won	
Asia Artist Awards	2018	Artist of the Year	Ryu Jun-yeol	Won	
Asia Artist Awards	2018	Popularity Award	Ryu Jun-yeol	Won	
Asia Artist Awards	2024	Best Artist Award – Television/Film	Ryu Jun-yeol	Won	
Baeksang Arts Awards	2016	Best New Actor – Television	Reply 1988	Won	
Baeksang Arts Awards	2017	Best New Actor – Film	The King	Won	
Baeksang Arts Awards	2023	Best Actor – Film	The Night Owl	Won	
Blue Dragon Film Awards	2017	Best New Actor	A Taxi Driver	Nominated	
Blue Dragon Film Awards	2023	Best Actor	The Night Owl	Nominated	
Blue Dragon Series Awards	2024	Best Actor	The 8 Show	Nominated	
Buil Film Awards	2017	Best Supporting Actor	The King	Nominated	
Buil Film Awards	2023	Best Actor	The Night Owl	Nominated	
Chunsa Film Art Awards	2016	Best New Actor	Socialphobia	Nominated	
Chunsa Film Art Awards	2018	Best Supporting Actor	A Taxi Driver	Nominated	
Director's Cut Awards	2023	Best Actor in film	The Night Owl	Nominated	
Fashionista Awards	2016	Best Fashionista – TV Division	Ryu Jun-yeol	Won	
Fashionista Awards	2017	Best Fashionista – SNS Division	Ryu Jun-yeol	Nominated	
Golden Cinema Film Festival	2019	Cinematographers' Choice Popularity Award	Believer	Won	
Golden Cinema Film Festival	2023	Best Actor	The Night Owl	Won	
Grand Bell Awards	2023	Best Actor	The Night Owl	Nominated	
InStyle Star Icon	2016	New Generation Actor Award	Socialphobia, Reply 1988	Nominated	
KAFA FILMS	2015	Rising Star	Socialphobia	Won	
Korean Cable TV Awards	2016	Rising Star	Reply 1988	Won	
Korea First Brand Awards	2016	Special Award for Figure	Ryu Jun-yeol	Won	
Korean Association of Film Critics Awards	2023	Best Actor	The Night Owl	Won	
Korea World Youth Film Festival	2018	Popular Actor Award	Little Forest	Won	
Korea Youth Film Festival	2019	Best Actor Award	Money, The Battle: Roar to Victory	Won	
London East Asia Film Festival	2019	Rising Star Award	Money	Won	
Max Movie Awards	2016	Best New Actor	Socialphobia	Won	
Max Movie Awards	2016	Rising Star	Socialphobia	Won	
MBC Drama Awards	2016	Top Excellence Award, Actor in a Miniseries	Lucky Romance	Nominated	
MBC Drama Awards	2016	Best New Actor	Lucky Romance	Won	
New York Asian Film Festival	2019	Star Asia Rising Star Award	Money	Won	
The Seoul Awards	2017	Best New Actor (Film)	The King	Won	
tvN10 Awards	2016	Made in tvN, Actor in Drama	Reply 1988	Nominated	
tvN10 Awards	2016	Rising Star Award, Actor	Reply 1988	Won	
Wildflower Film Awards	2016	Best New Actor / Actress	Socialphobia	Nominated	

=== State honors ===
Name of country and organization, year given, and name of honor
Country	Organization	Year	Honor / Award	Ref.
South Korea	Korea Minister of Health and Welfare	2017	Suicide Prevention Contribution Award	
South Korea	Korean Popular Culture and Arts Awards (Note: Honors are given at the Korean Popular Culture and Arts Awards, arranged by the Korea Creative Content Agency and hosted by the Ministry of Culture, Sports and Tourism. They are awarded to those who have contributed to the arts and South Korea's pop culture.)	2019	Minister of Culture, Sports, and Tourism's Commendation	

=== Listicles ===
Name of publisher, year listed, name of listicle, and placement
Publisher	Year	Listicle	Placement	Ref.
Forbes	2017	Korea Power Celebrity 40	14th	
Forbes	2018	Korea Power Celebrity 40	36th	
Forbes	2019	Korea Power Celebrity 40	11th	
Korean Film Council	2021	Korean Actors 200 (Note: Introduces 200 actors that best represent the present and future of Korean cinema to the people in the film industry all over the world.)	Included	
