= Money (2019 film) =

- Theatrical release poster
- Hangul: 돈
- RR: Don
- MR: Ton
- Directed by: Park Noo-ri
- Screenplay by: Park Noo-ri
- Based on: a novel by Jang Hyun-do
- Produced by: Han Jae-duk; Yoon Jong-bin
- Starring: Ryu Jun-yeol; Yoo Ji-tae; Jo Woo-jin
- Cinematography: Hong Jae-sik
- Edited by: Kim Sang-bum
- Music by: Hwang Sang-jun
- Production companies: Sanai Pictures; Moonlight Film
- Distributed by: Showbox
- Release date: March 20, 2019
- Running time: 115 minutes
- Country: South Korea
- Language: Korean
- Box office: US$25.1 million

Money (Korean: 돈; RR: Don) is a 2019 South Korean action crime film directed and written by Park Noo-ri. The film stars Ryu Jun-yeol, Yoo Ji-tae and Jo Woo-jin.

== Plot ==
About a man who dreams of becoming rich. He becomes a stockbroker but soon he finds himself caught up in stock market scams.

== Cast ==
- Ryu Jun-yeol as Jo Il-hyun
- Yoo Ji-tae as Beon Ho-pyo / The Ticket
- Jo Woo-jin as Han Ji-chul
- Kim Jae-young as Jun Woo-sung
- Won Jin-ah as Park Si-eun
- Im Se-mi as Ye-ji
- Jin Seon-kyu as Park Chang-goo
- Oh Hee-joon as Stock company unemployed man
- Daniel Henney (cameo)

== Production ==
Principal photography began on May 12, 2017, and ended on August 29, 2017.
