= Yum Jung-ah =

South Korean actress (born 1972)

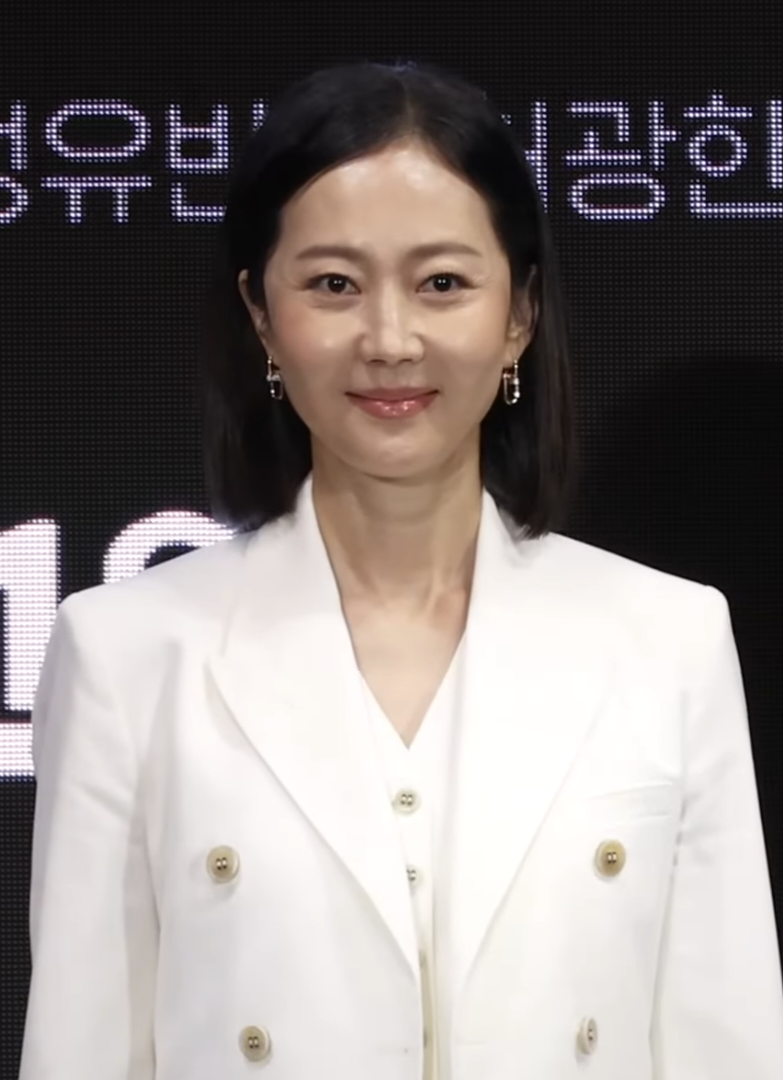
- Yum in July 2024
- Born: July 28, 1972 (age 54); Seoul, South Korea
- Education: ChungAng University
- Years active: 1991–present
- Agents: Fantagio; Artist Company
- Spouse: Heo Il (m. 2006)
- Children: 2
- Beauty pageant titleholder
- Major competitions: Miss Korea 1991 (1st Runner-Up); Miss International 1992 (2nd Runner-Up)

Korean name
- Hangul: 염정아
- Hanja: 廉晶雅
- RR: Yeom Jeonga
- MR: Yŏm Chŏnga

Yum Jung-ah (Korean: 염정아; born July 28, 1972) is a South Korean actress and beauty pageant titleholder. Her notable films include A Tale of Two Sisters (2003), The Big Swindle (2004), The Old Garden (2006), and Cart (2014), as well as the television series Royal Family (2011), and Sky Castle (2018). She was the first runner-up at Miss Korea 1991 and represented South Korea in Miss International 1992 and finished as the second runner-up.

== Career ==
=== Early career and Miss Korea ===
After graduating from Chung-Ang University's Department of Theater and Film, Yum Jung-ah entered the entertainment industry through beauty pageants. She was the first runner-up at the Miss Korea 1991 pageant. That same year, she made her acting debut in the MBC drama Our Heaven. In 1992, she represented South Korea in the Miss International pageant, where she also finished as the second runner-up.

Early in her career, public recognition was not immediate. Yum Jung-ah recalled that even in her twenties, she was persistently known by the modifier "actress who was a Miss Korea," stating, "There were times when I complained, 'Why do I only get flashy roles?'"

=== Breakthrough roles ===
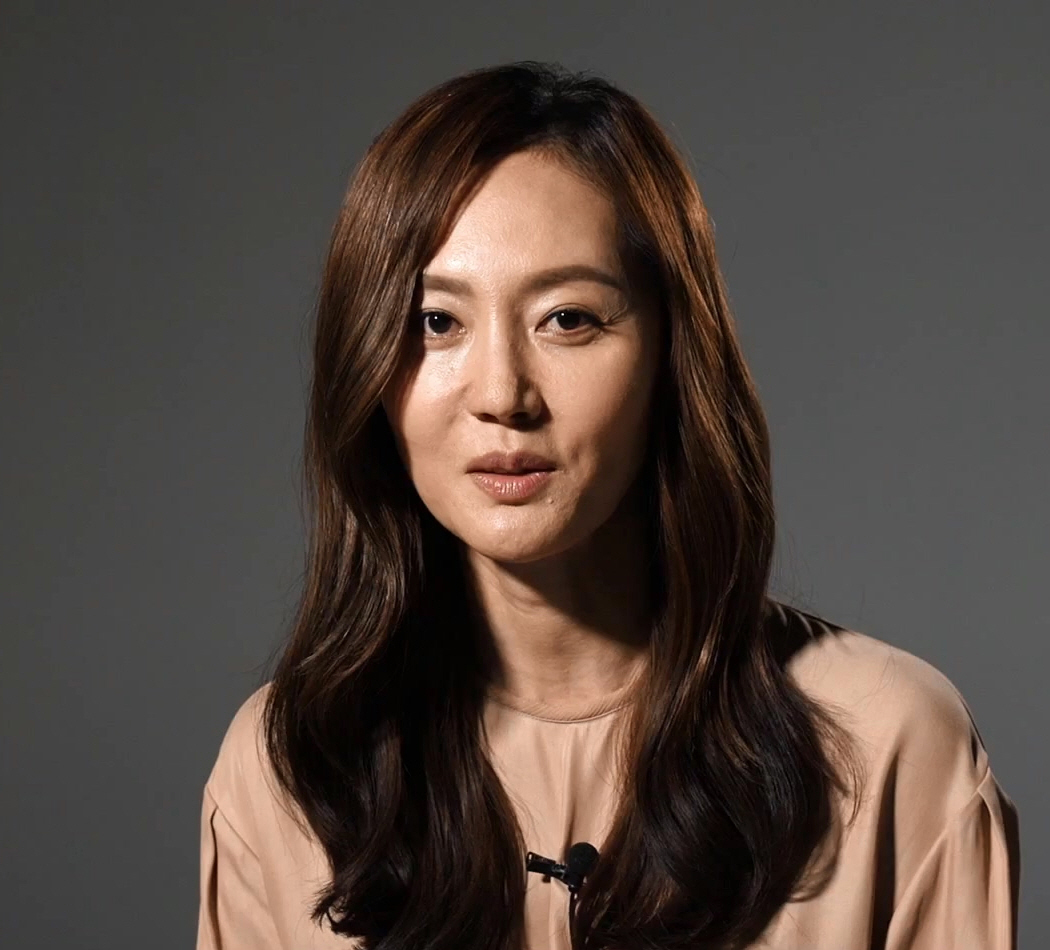
Yum in 2017

In 1998, she appeared in the KBS 2TV dramas When Azaleas Bloom and Legend of Ambition, earning the KBS Drama Awards Excellence Award for Actress.

It was with director Kim Jee-woon's 2003 film A Tale of Two Sisters that Yeom Jeong-ah truly left her mark. This film established her reputation as a formidable actress. In the film, she portrayed a hysterical and grotesque young stepmother who mistreats her children, delivering a chilling performance that solidified her presence in the Korean film industry.

In 2004, she further established herself as a prominent actress with her portrayal of a mature femme fatale in director Choi Dong-hoon's debut film, The Big Crime. This role earned her the Best Actress award at the Blue House Film Critics Association Awards, marking the beginning of her golden era. That same year, in Teacher vs. Student, she showcased her versatility as an "acting chameleon" by taking on a comedic role that was a stark contrast to her typical characters. Beyond her acting talent, she made a name for herself with this film, leading it to box office success.

== Personal life ==
=== Marriage and family ===
Yum married Heo Il on December 30, 2006. They have 2 children.

Her younger sister Yeom Jeong-yeon participated in the 1st KBS Super Talent Contest in 1995 along with Song Yoon-ah and Cha Tae-hyun and won a prize.

== Filmography ==
=== Film ===
Year	Title	Role	Notes	Ref.
1992	Jazz Bar Hiroshima	Sayuri		
1995	Terrorist	Hwang Chae-eun		
1999	Tell Me Something	Oh Seung-min		
2002	H	Detective Kim Mi-yeon		
2003	A Tale of Two Sisters	Heo Eun-joo		
2004	The Big Swindle	Seo In-kyeong		
2004	Lovely Rivals	Yeo Mi-ok		
2004	Three... Extremes	Actress playing a vampire	Segment: "Cut" (cameo)	
2005	Twentidentity		Segment: "20mm Thick"	
2005	Sad Movie	Yeom Ju-young		
2005	Boy Goes to Heaven	Bu-ja		
2006	The Old Garden	Han Yun-hee		
2007	The Worst Guy Ever	Oh Joo-yeon		
2007	Small Town Rivals	Tearoom madam	Cameo	
2009	Jeon Woo-chi: The Taoist Wizard	Actress	Cameo	
2012	The Spies	Assistant manager Kang		
2012	Love Potion	Wife	Short film	
2014	Cart	Sun-hee		
2017	The Mimic	Hee-yeon		
2018	Intimate Strangers	Soo-hyun		
2019	Hit-and-Run Squad	Yoo Ji-Hyun		
2019	Trade Your Love	Mrs. Cheon		
2019	Another Child	Young-joo		
2019	Start-Up	Yoon Jung-hye		
2020	Steel Rain 2: Summit	First lady	Cameo	
2022	Alienoid	Heug-seol		
2022	Life Is Beautiful	Oh Se-yeon		
2023	Smugglers	Um Jin-sook		
2024	Alienoid: Return to the Future	Heug-seol		
2024	Mission: Cross	Mi-seon		
TBA	Starlight Falls		Cameo	
TBA	Land	Hwa-sook		

=== Television series ===
Year	Title	Role	Notes	Ref.
1991	Our Paradise			
1993	January			
1993	Good Morning, Yeongdong!	Hye-jin		
1993	Iljimae	Seol-hwa		
1994	Ambition			
1994	MBC Best Theater: "Man and Woman"			
1994	A Human Land	Kim Geum-dan		
1995	The Blue Sky	Park Yoon-jung		
1995	Good Man, Good Woman	Kang Yeon-joo		
1995	Korea Gate	Shin Jae-soon		
1996	Colors: "Opening the Violet Blinds"			
1996	Lee Hong-ryeol's Eat Drink Man Woman			
1996	The Scent of Apple Blossoms	Park Shin-hee		
1996	The Brothers' River	Kim So-hee		
1997	Model	Park Soo-ah		
1997	Fences on Fire			
1998	Until the Azalea Blooms			
1998	Seven Brides			
1998	Legendary Ambition	Park Jae-hee		
1998	MBC Best Theater: "Fanny and Alexander"	Soo-mi		
1998	You Are My Song	Lee Jae-sook		
1999	School	Korean language teacher Cha Hyun-joo		
1999	Crystal	Jo Soo-ah		
1999	Rising Sun, Rising Moon	Kim Yoon-ji		
2000	Emperor Wang Gun	Queen Janghwa		
2001	Drama City: "Yoon Sa-wol"	Jae-kyung		
2001	Purity	Jang Ho-sook		
2003	Lovers	Jo Jin-seo		
2004	Say You Love Me	Jo Yi-na		
2008	Working Mom	Choi Ga-young		
2011	Royal Family	Kim In-sook		
2012	Flower Band	Kwon Ji-hyuk's mother	Cameo (episode 15)	
2012	My Lover, Madame Butterfly	Nam Na-bi		
2013	After School: Lucky or Not		Cameo (episode 2)	
2013	Your Neighbor's Wife	Chae Song-ha		
2016	Secret Healer	Shaman Hong-joo		
2018	Sky Castle	Han Seo-jin / Kwak Mi-hyang		
2021	Snowdrop	Song Hye-joo	Cameo	
2022	Cleaning Up	Eo Yong-mi		
2024	No Way Out: The Roulette	Ahn Myung-ja		
2025	The Defects	Kim Se-hee		
2025	Love, Take Two	Lee ji-an		

=== Variety shows ===
Year	Title	Notes/Ref.
1991	Entertainment Weekly	
1992	전원집합 토요대행진	
1992	초 마술의 세계 미스터 마릭	
1992	밤으로 가는 쇼	
1993	Concert of Dreams	
1996	Female MC Showdown	
1996	Scoop Entertainment City	
1997	TV Loaded with Love	
1997	Field Experience of Life	
1998	Tuesday Special with Seo Se-won	
2013	Human Documentary: Your Story	Narration
2013	Thank You	
2014	True Live Show	Host
2019	Three Meals a Day: Mountain Village	Main cast
2024–present	Fresh off the Sea	Main cast

=== Music video appearance ===
Year	Song title	Artist
2005	"I'm Not Laughing"	Leessang feat. Ali

== Musical theatre ==
Year	Title	Role
1993	Beauty and the Beast	

== Accolades ==
=== Awards and nominations ===
Sortable table of awards and nominations received by Yeom Jung-ah
Year	Award ceremony	Category	Nominee / Work	Result	Ref.
1991	Miss Korea Pageant	First Runner-up	—N/a	Won	
1991	Miss Korea Pageant	Miss Photogenic	—N/a	Won	
1992	Miss International Pageant	Second Runner-up	—N/a	Won	
1998	KBS Drama Awards	Excellence Award, Actress		Won	
2003	6th Director's Cut Awards	Best Actress	A Tale of Two Sisters	Won	
2003	24th Blue Dragon Film Awards	Best Supporting Actress	A Tale of Two Sisters	Nominated	
2004	22nd Brussels International Fantastic Film Festival	Best Supporting Actress	A Tale of Two Sisters	Won	
2004	41st Grand Bell Awards	Best Actress	A Tale of Two Sisters	Nominated	
2004	24th Korean Association of Film Critics Awards	Best Actress	The Big Swindle	Won	
2004	25th Blue Dragon Film Awards	Best Supporting Actress	The Big Swindle	Won	
2004	6th Asian Film Critics Association Awards	Best Supporting Actress	The Big Swindle	Won	
2006	12th Chlotrudis Awards	Best Supporting Actress	A Tale of Two Sisters	Nominated	
2007	43rd Baeksang Arts Awards	Best Actress – Film	The Old Garden	Won	
2008	SBS Drama Awards	Excellence Award, Actress in a Drama Special	Working Mom	Nominated	
2011	4th Korea Drama Awards	Best Actress	Royal Family	Won	
2011	MBC Drama Awards	Top Excellence Award, Actress in a Miniseries	Royal Family	Nominated	
2012	SBS Drama Awards	Excellence Award, Actress in a Weekend/Daily Drama	My Lover, Madame Butterfly	Nominated	
2013	SBS Drama Awards	Top Excellence Award, Actress in a Weekend/Daily Drama	My Lover, Madame Butterfly	Nominated	
2014	15th Women in Film Korea Awards	Woman in Film of the Year	Cart	Won	
2015	51st Baeksang Arts Awards	Best Actress – Film	Cart	Won	
2015	20th Chunsa Film Art Awards	Best Actress	Cart	Nominated	
2015	24th Buil Film Awards	Best Actress	Cart	Nominated	
2017	54th Grand Bell Awards	Best Actress	The Mimic	Nominated	
2017	38th Blue Dragon Film Awards	Best Leading Actress	The Mimic	Nominated	
2018	27th Buil Film Awards	Best Actress	The Mimic	Nominated	
2019	55th Baeksang Arts Awards	Grand Prize (Daesang) for Television	Sky Castle	Nominated	
2019	55th Baeksang Arts Awards	Best Actress – Television	Sky Castle	Won	
2019	12th Korea Drama Awards	Grand Prize (Daesang)	Sky Castle	Nominated	
2022	31st Buil Film Awards	Best Supporting Actress	Alienoid	Nominated	
2022	58th Grand Bell Awards	Best Actress	Life Is Beautiful	Won	
2022	43rd Blue Dragon Film Awards	Best Leading Actress	Life Is Beautiful	Nominated	
2023	Director's Cut Awards	Best Actress	Life Is Beautiful	Nominated	
2023	59th Baeksang Arts Awards	Best Actress – Film	Life Is Beautiful	Nominated	
2023	59th Baeksang Arts Awards	Best Supporting Actress – Film	Alienoid	Nominated	
2023	32nd Buil Film Awards	Best Actress	Smugglers	Nominated	
2023	59th Grand Bell Awards	Best Actress	Smugglers	Nominated	
2023	44th Blue Dragon Film Awards	Best Leading Actress	Smugglers	Nominated	
2024	60th Baeksang Arts Awards	Best Actress – Film	Smugglers	Nominated	
2024	60th Baeksang Arts Awards	Best Supporting Actress – Film	Alienoid: Return to the Future	Nominated	

=== Listicles ===
Name of publisher, year listed, name of listicle, and placement
Publisher	Year	Listicle	Placement	Ref.
Cine21	2021	Actress to watch out for in 2022	4th (Note: Tied with Park Eun-bin and IU)	
Korean Film Council	2021	Korean Actors 200 (Note: The list introduces the 200 actors that best represent the present and future of Korean cinema to the people in the film industry all over the world.)	Placed	
