= Kim Tae-ri =

South Korean actress (born 1990)

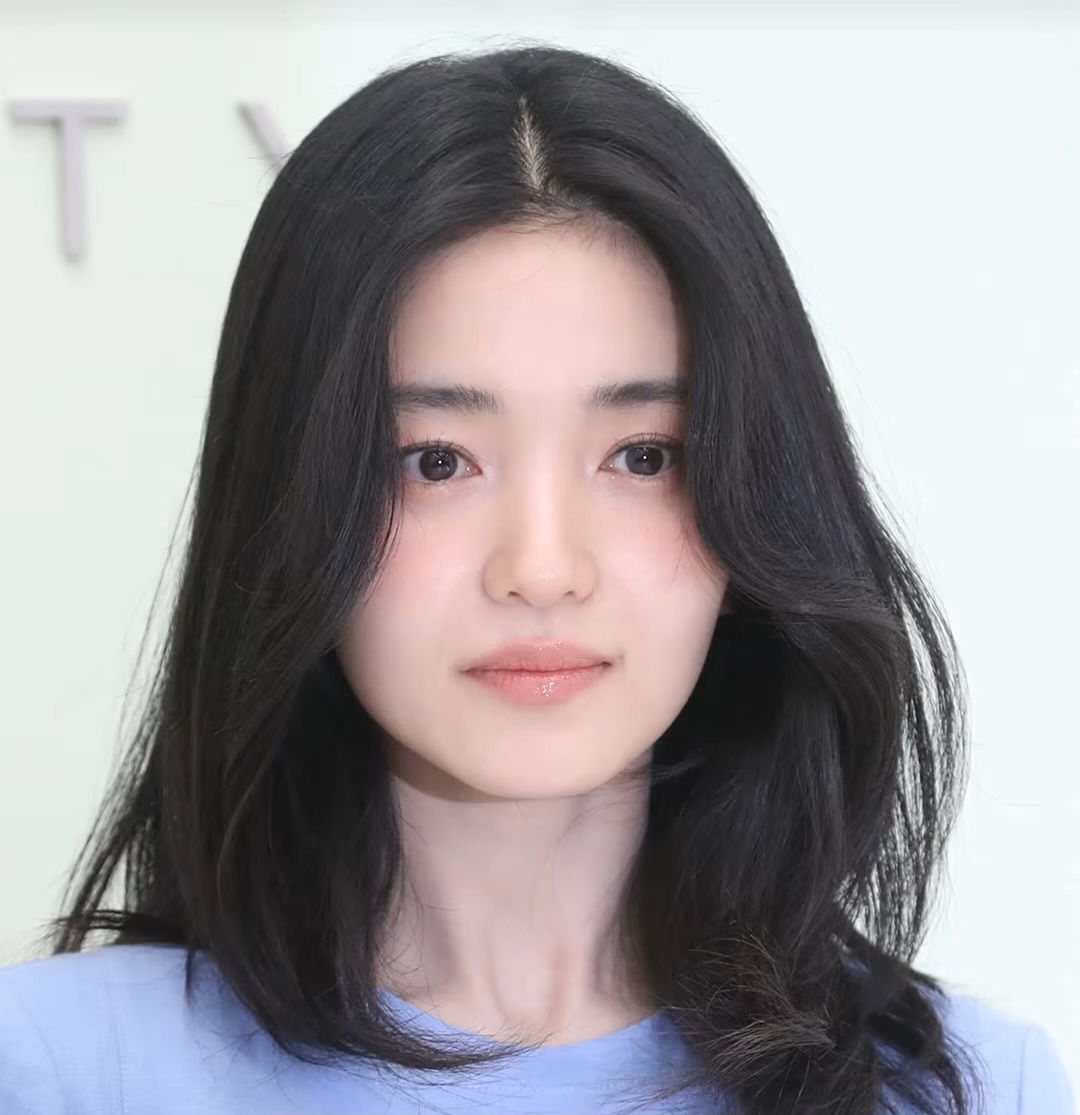
- Kim in April 2026
- Born: April 24, 1990 (age 36); Seoul, South Korea
- Education: Kyung Hee University (BA in Journalism and Communication)
- Occupation: Actress
- Years active: 2016–present
- Agent: Management MMM
- Height: 166 cm (5 ft 5 in)

Korean name
- Hangul: 김태리
- RR: Gim Taeri
- MR: Kim T'aeri
- Website: management-mmm.com

Signature
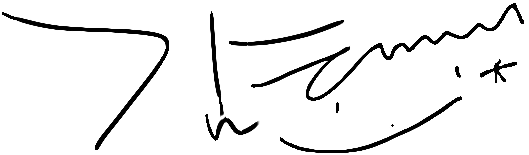

Kim Tae-ri (Korean: 김태리; born April 24, 1990) is a South Korean actress. Known for her work in both television and film, she has received various accolades, including three Baeksang Arts Awards, one Blue Dragon Film Award and one Buil Film Award, in addition to nominations at the Grand Bell Awards and Chunsa Film Art Awards.

Kim gained widespread recognition for her breakthrough role as Sook-hee in Park Chan-wook's critically acclaimed film The Handmaiden (2016), which premiered at the Cannes Film Festival and earned her the Blue Dragon Film Award for Best New Actress. She subsequently appeared in the political thriller 1987: When the Day Comes (2017) and the drama film Little Forest (2018), which earned her Best Actress nominations at the Baeksang Arts Awards and the Blue Dragon Film Awards.

On television, Kim received the Baeksang Arts Award for Best Actress for her performances in Twenty-Five Twenty-One (2022) and Jeongnyeon: The Star Is Born (2024), and earned additional critical praise for Mr. Sunshine (2018) and Revenant (2023). In 2019, Kim was featured by Forbes in their 30 Under 30 list in the Entertainment & Sports category, and in 2024, Gallup Korea ranked her as Korea's Television Actor of the Year.

== Early life ==
Kim was born on April 24, 1990, in Sangbong-dong, Jungnang District, Seoul, South Korea. After graduating from Youngshin Nursing Business High School, she studied Journalism and Communication at Kyung Hee University from 2008 to 2012. She was inspired to become an actress in her second year of university after joining a theater club.

== Career ==
=== Early work and breakthrough (2012–2017) ===
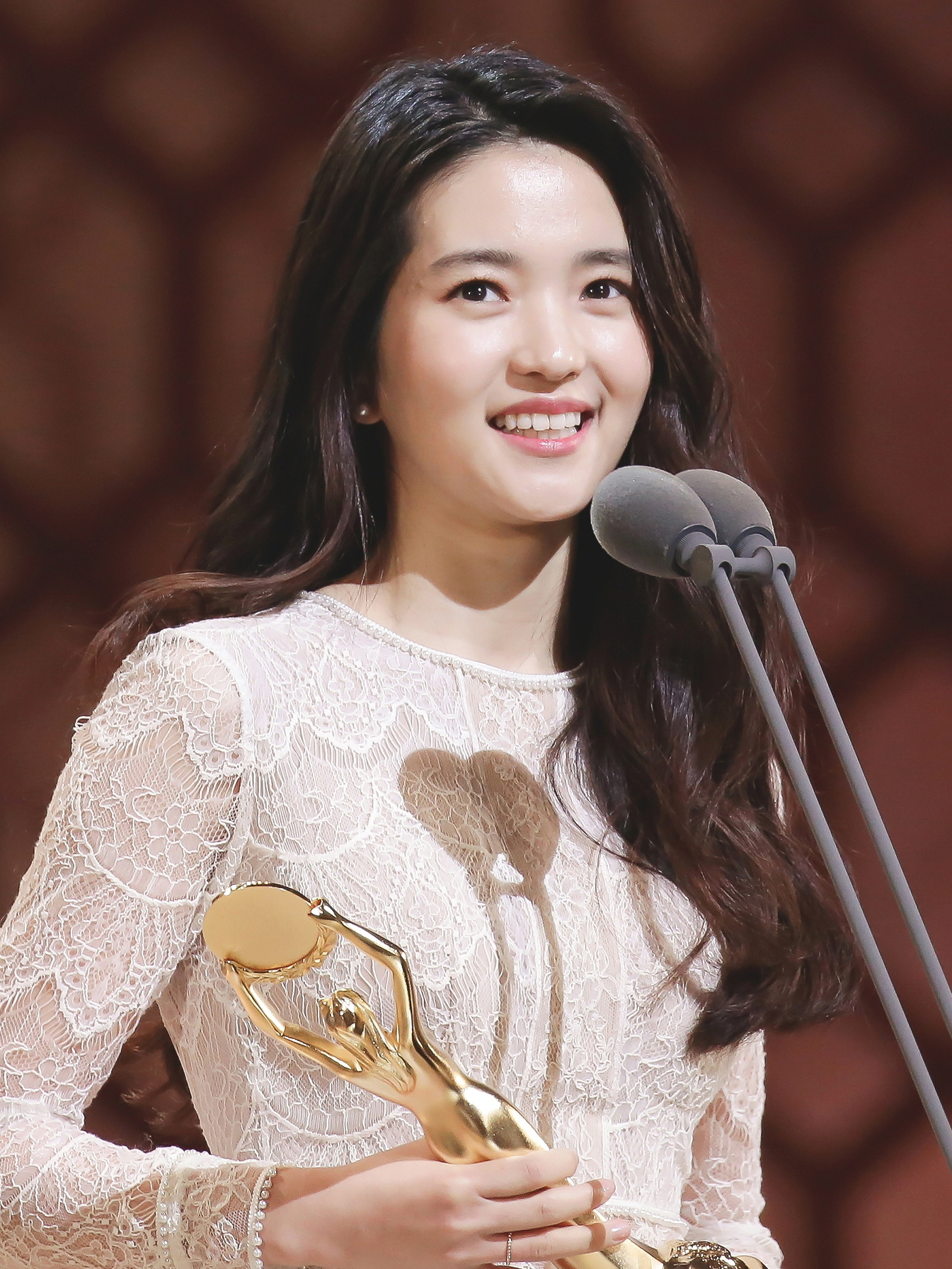
Kim winning the Blue Dragon Film Award for Best New Actress

After graduating from university, Kim spent a year working as part of the technical crew for the Iru theatre troupe in Daehangno. She was later cast as the understudy for Kang Ae-shim in the 2012 production of Spoonface Steinberg, although she did not perform on stage. She went on to appear in the plays Pansy and Ask for Love, and was double-cast in the 2013 rerun of Spoonface Steinberg. That same year, she filmed Moon Young, a short film that premiered at the Seoul Independent Film Festival in 2015, with a theatrical version released in 2017. In 2014, Kim signed with J-Wide Company and began appearing in various television commercials. During this period, she continued acting in short films and auditioned extensively for feature film roles, but faced numerous rejections.

In 2016, Kim made her feature film debut in Park Chan-wook's The Handmaiden, having been selected from among 1,500 actresses who auditioned for the role. Her performance earned her multiple Best New Actress awards, including at the Blue Dragon Film Awards, Director's Cut Awards, Buil Film Awards, and Busan Film Critics Awards. Park Chan-wook later remarked that his first impression of Kim strongly reminded him of his initial meeting with actress Kang Hye-jung, who achieved her breakthrough in his film Oldboy (2003).

The following year, Kim appeared in the ensemble political thriller 1987: When the Day Comes, which earned her Best Actress nominations at the Grand Bell Awards and Chunsa Film Art Awards.

=== Established actress (2018–present) ===
In 2018, Kim headlined the Korean film adaptation of the manga series Little Forest, alongside Ryu Jun-yeol and Jin Ki-joo. Her performance won her a Director's Cut Award and garnered Best Actress nominations at the Blue Dragon Film Awards, Baeksang Arts Awards and Buil Film Awards. The same year, she made her television debut in the period melodrama Mr. Sunshine, written by Kim Eun-sook, earning her a third nomination at the Baeksang Arts Awards, this time for Best Actress in Television. Upon its final broadcast, Mr. Sunshine became the third highest-rated series in Korean cable television history.

In 2019, Kim was named to Forbes 30 Under 30 list in the Entertainment & Sports category.

In 2021, Kim starred as Captain Jang in Jo Sung-hee's Space Sweepers, regarded as the first Korean space blockbuster. Kim was drawn to the film due to its genre and her character's role, as she said: "I don't think there has ever been a [Korean] film in which a woman was a captain." After its release on Netflix, the film received generally positive reviews, complimenting the characters and the special effects. In a review for Decider, Johnny Loftus described Kim's performance as the "picture of laconic cool" and likened her interpretation of the character's selfishness and greediness to Tessa Thompson's Valkyrie in Thor: Ragnarok (2017).

In July 2021, Kim moved to Management MMM after her contract with J-Wide expired.

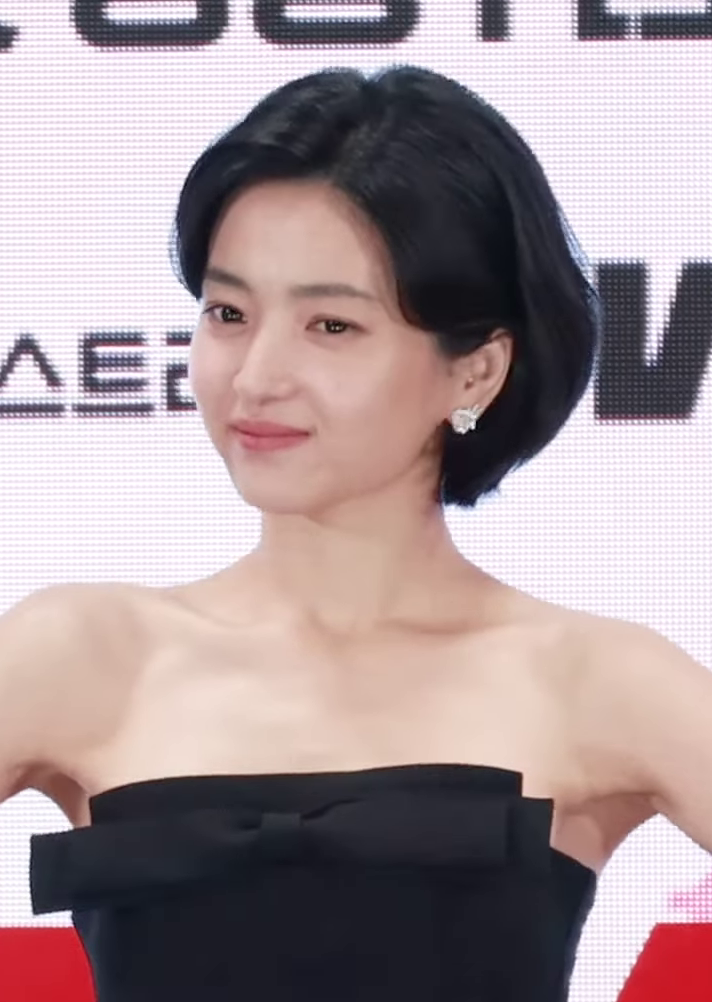
Kim at the press conference for Jeongnyeon: The Star Is Born in 2024

She returned to television in 2022, starring in the coming-of-age romance series Twenty-Five Twenty-One, which marked her second collaboration with one of the directors of Mr. Sunshine, Jung Ji-hyun. Upon reading the script, Kim was drawn to the "bright, energetic nature" of her character Na Hee-do, a high school fencer overcoming difficulties during the IMF crisis. In preparation for the role, she learned fencing for six months, watched numerous YouTube videos and requested an expert on set during fencing scenes. At the time, Twenty-Five Twenty-One was the 18th highest-rated series in Korean cable television history and achieved success on Netflix, leading to Kim's rise in popularity among international audiences. Cine21's Song Kyung-won deemed Kim vital to the success of the series. For her portrayal of Na Hee-do, she was named both Best Actress in Television and Most Popular Actress at the Baeksang Arts Awards.

Later that year, Kim starred as Lee Ahn in the first part of Choi Dong-hoon's two-part science fiction action film Alienoid, alongside Little Forest co-star Ryu Jun-yeol and Kim Woo-bin. Kim attended action school and learned gymnastics, various types of martial arts and shooting to prepare for the role. Alienoid was shot simultaneously with its follow-up film for 13 months. The film was a box-office failure, earning $12 million worldwide against a budget of over ₩30 billion ($22.9 million). It received mixed reviews in South Korea, with Kim Boram of Yonhap News Agency criticizing the story but appreciating Kim and Ryu's chemistry and action sequences. International critics wrote more positive reviews, often praising the film's ensemble cast.

In 2023, Kim starred in Revenant, alongside Oh Jung-se and Hong Kyung. She was praised for her dual portrayal of Gu San-yeong and the malicious spirit within her, and received the Grand Prize at the SBS Drama Awards. The following year, Kim starred as the titular character in the television adaptation of the webtoon Jeong-nyeon, written by Seo Yi-re and illustrated by Na Mon. The artist said that she had initially used Kim's character in The Handmaiden as reference while drawing Jeong-nyeon. Kim's performance was widely praised for its emotional depth and vocal versatility, earning her a second Baeksang Arts Award for Best Actress in Television. Gallup Korea later ranked her as Korea's Television Actor of the Year. She also reprised her role as Lee Ahn in Alienoid: Return to the Future. Despite mixed reviews, it opened at first place on Korean box office with 103,467 admissions and a gross of US$746,073.

Kim made her voice acting debut in the 2025 South Korean animated science fiction romance film Lost in Starlight, which was the first South Korean feature-length animated film to be released on Netflix.

In 2026, Kim appeared as a regular cast member in Curtain Up, Class!, a new variety show produced by tvN.

== Endorsements ==
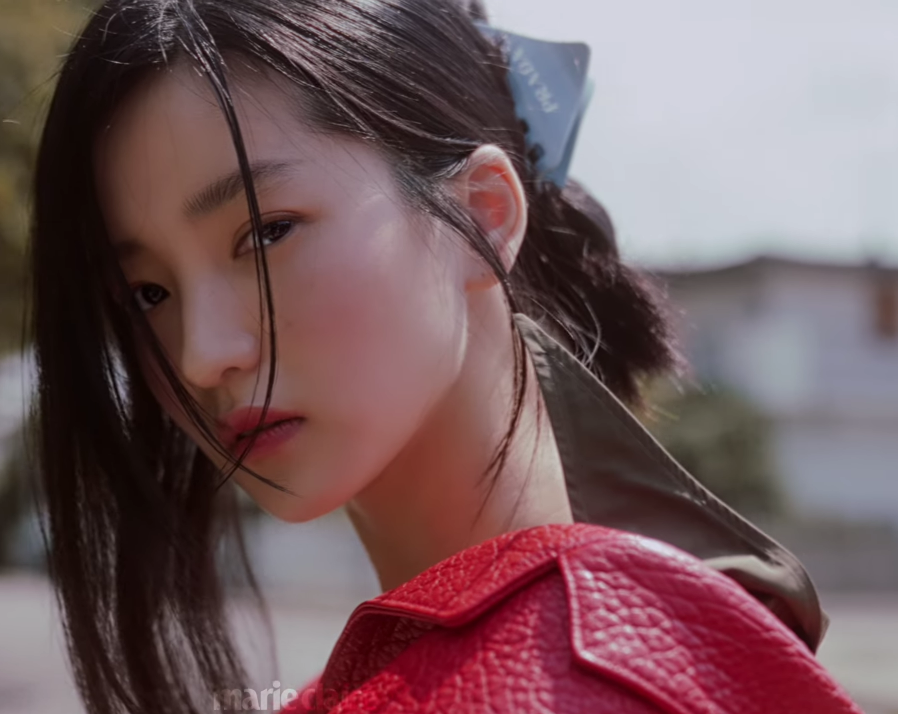
Kim in a promotional video for Prada in 2023

Since 2017, Kim has served as a brand ambassador for the South Korean high-end cosmetics brand O Hui. In 2018, she was chosen as face of Kenzo's signature fragrance, Flower by Kenzo, and was also appointed the Korean ambassador for the American luxury jewelry house Tiffany & Co., a role she held until 2021. In 2021, she became a brand ambassador for Italian luxury fashion house Prada. In January 2022, the South Korean women's fashion brand Itmichaa announced her as its new muse.

== Filmography ==
=== Film ===
Year	Title	Role	Note	Ref.
2015	Moon Young	Kim Moon-young	Independent film	
2016	The Handmaiden	Nam Sook-hee		
2017	1987: When the Day Comes	Lee Yeon-hee		
2018	Little Forest	Song Hye-won		
2021	Space Sweepers	Captain Jang / Jang Hyun-sook		
2022	Alienoid	Lee Ahn		
2024	Alienoid: Return to the Future	Lee Ahn		
2025	Lost in Starlight	Joo Nan-young	Voice	

=== Television series ===
Year	Title	Role	Note	Ref.
2016	Entourage	Herself	Cameo (Ep. 1)	
2018	Mr. Sunshine	Go Ae-shin		
2022	Twenty-Five Twenty-One	Na Hee-do		
2023	Revenant	Gu San-young		
2024	Jeongnyeon: The Star Is Born	Yoon Jeong-nyeon		
TBA	Sister, I'm The Queen in This Life	Shim A-ri		

=== Television shows ===
Year	Title	Role	Notes	Ref.
2026	Curtain Up, Class!	Cast member		

=== Hosting ===
Year	Title	Notes	Ref.
2024	2024 MAMA Awards	November 23 ceremony	

== Theater ==
Theater play performances
Year	Title	Role	Ref.
2012	Spoonface Steinberg (넙쭉이)	Flounder (understudy)	
2013	Ask for Love (사랑을 묻다)	Tae-ri	
2013	Spoonface Steinberg (넙쭉이)	Flounder	
2013	I'm Disappointed in You (너한테 실망이야)	Yuna	
2013	Pansy (팬지)	Min-hee	

== Discography ==
=== Singles ===
Title	Year	Peak chart positions		Album	Ref.
Title	Year	KOR Gaon	KOR Hot	Album	Ref.
"Segimalui Norae"	2016	—	—	The Handmaiden OST	
"Hidden Road by Lee Hanyeol" (with Gang Dong-won)	2018	—	—	1987: When the Day Comes OST	
"Hidden Road by Yeonheui" (with Gang Dong-won)	2018	—	—	1987: When the Day Comes OST	
"With" (with Nam Joo-hyuk, Kim Ji-yeon, Choi Hyun-wook and Lee Joo-myung)	2022	40	54	Twenty-Five Twenty-One OST	
"—" denotes a recording that did not chart

== Accolades ==
=== Awards and nominations ===
Name of the award ceremony, year presented, award category, nominee(s) of the award and the result of the nomination
Award	Year	Category	Nominee(s) / Work(s)	Result	Ref.
APAN Star Awards	2018	Best New Actress	Mr. Sunshine	Won	
APAN Star Awards	2022	Top Excellence Award, Actress in a Miniseries	Twenty-Five Twenty-One	Nominated	
APAN Star Awards	2022	Popularity Star Award, Actress	Twenty-Five Twenty-One	Nominated	
APAN Star Awards	2023	Top Excellence Actress in Medium-Length Series	Revenant	Nominated	
APAN Star Awards	2024	Top Excellence Actress in Medium-Length Series	Jeongnyeon: The Star Is Born	Nominated	
APAN Star Awards	2024	Grand Prize (Daesang) (Note: A Daesang (Korean: 대상), which translates to "Grand Prize", is the highest honor given out at South Korean award ceremonies.)	Jeongnyeon: The Star Is Born	Won	
Asia Artist Awards	2017	Best Entertainer	Kim Tae-ri	Won	
Asian Film Awards	2017	Best Newcomer	The Handmaiden	Won	
Baeksang Arts Awards	2017	Best New Actress – Film	The Handmaiden	Nominated	
Baeksang Arts Awards	2018	Best Actress – Film	Little Forest	Nominated	
Baeksang Arts Awards	2019	Best Actress – Television	Mr. Sunshine	Nominated	
Baeksang Arts Awards	2022	Best Actress – Television	Twenty-Five Twenty-One	Won	
Baeksang Arts Awards	2022	Most Popular Actress	Twenty-Five Twenty-One	Won	
Baeksang Arts Awards	2025	Best Actress – Television	Jeongnyeon: The Star Is Born	Won	
Blue Dragon Film Awards	2016	Best New Actress	The Handmaiden	Won	
Blue Dragon Film Awards	2018	Best Actress	Little Forest	Nominated	
Brand of the Year Awards	2022	Best Actress	Kim Tae-ri	Won	
Buil Film Awards	2016	Best New Actress	The Handmaiden	Won	
Buil Film Awards	2018	Best Actress	Little Forest	Nominated	
Buil Film Awards	2022	Popular Star Award – Female	Alienoid	Nominated	
Busan Film Critics Awards	2016	Best New Actress	The Handmaiden	Won	
Chunsa Film Art Awards	2017	Best New Actress	The Handmaiden	Nominated	
Chunsa Film Art Awards	2018	Best Actress	1987: When the Day Comes	Nominated	
Chunsa Film Art Awards	2019	Best Actress	Little Forest	Nominated	
Cine21 Film Awards	2016	Best New Actress	The Handmaiden	Won	
Director's Cut Awards	2016	Best New Actress	The Handmaiden	Won	
Director's Cut Awards	2018	Best Actress	Little Forest	Won	
Grand Bell Awards	2018	Best Actress	1987: When the Day Comes	Nominated	
Fundex Awards	2024	TV Drama Female Lead	Jeongnyeon: The Star Is Born	Nominated	
Huading Awards	2023	Best Global Teleplay Leading Actress	Twenty-Five Twenty-One	Nominated	
Kinolights Awards	2022	Actress of the Year (Domestic)	Twenty-Five Twenty-One	3rd place	
K-Culture Trend Forum	2024	MVP of the Year (Drama category)	Jeongnyeon: The Star Is Born	Won	
KOFRA Film Awards	2017	Best New Actress	The Handmaiden	Won	
Korea Advertisers Contest Advertisers Night-KAA Awards	2022	Advertiser's Model Award	Kim Tae-ri	Won	
Korea Broadcasting Awards	2024	Best Actress	Revenant	Won	
Korea Drama Awards	2018	Best New Actress	Mr. Sunshine	Nominated	
Korea Drama Awards	2022	Grand Prize (Daesang)	Twenty-Five Twenty-One	Nominated	
Korea First Brand Awards	2025	Best Actress (Drama)	Jeongnyeon: The Star Is Born	Won	
Korea World Youth Film Festival	2017	Favorite New Actress	The Handmaiden	Won	
Korea World Youth Film Festival	2018	Popular Actress Award	Little Forest	Won	
Marie Claire Film Festival	2017	Best Newcomer	The Handmaiden	Won	
SBS Drama Awards	2023	Grand Prize (Daesang) (Note: Co-won with Lee Je-hoon)	Revenant	Won	
SBS Drama Awards	2023	Top Excellence Award, Actress in a Miniseries Genre/Action Drama	Revenant	Nominated	
The Seoul Awards	2018	Best Supporting Actress	1987: When the Day Comes	Nominated	
The Seoul Awards	2018	Best New Actress	Mr. Sunshine	Nominated	
Shinfilm Art Film Festival	2018	Choi Eun-hee Actor Award	Little Forest	Won	
University Film Festival of Korea	2018	Best Actress	Little Forest	Won	
Women in Film Korea Festival	2016	Best New Actress	The Handmaiden	Won	
Yang Hye-sook Korean Theater Award	2024	Special Award	Jeongnyeon: The Star Is Born	Won	

=== State honors ===
Name of country, year given, and name of honor
Country	Award ceremony	Year	Honor or Award	Ref.
South Korea	Korean Popular Culture and Arts Awards (Note: Honors are given at the Korean Popular Culture and Arts Awards, arranged by the Korea Creative Content Agency and hosted by the Ministry of Culture, Sports and Tourism. They are awarded to those who have contributed to the arts and South Korea's pop culture.)	2018	Minister of Culture, Sports and Tourism Commendation	
South Korea	Korean Popular Culture and Arts Awards	2025	Prime Minister's Commendation	

=== Listicles ===
Name of publisher, year listed, name of listicle, and placement
Publisher	Year	Listicle	Placement	Ref.
Cine21	2020	Actress to watch out for in 2021	1st	
Cine21	2022	Actress to watch out for in 2023	2nd	
Elle Japan	2022	Top 16 Hallyu Best Actress	4th	
Forbes	2018	30 Under 30 – Asia	Included	
Forbes	2019	Korea Power Celebrity 40	23rd	
Forbes	2023	Korea Power Celebrity 40	28th	
Gallup Korea	2018	Television Actor of the Year	2nd	
Gallup Korea	2023	Television Actor of the Year	18th (Note: Kim Tae-ri tied with Han So-hee and Lim Ji-yeon (above 1.3%).)	
Gallup Korea	2024	Television Actor of the Year	1st	
