= Shin Cheol-jin =

South Korean actor (born 1956)

- Born: Shin Cheol-jin; 29 May 1956 (age 70); South Korea
- Other names: Sin Cheol-jin; Shin Chul-jin
- Occupation: Actor
- Years active: 1976–present
- Known for: Pied Piper; Hi Bye, Mama! Sky Castle

Shin Cheol-jin (Korean: 신철진; born 29 May 1956) is a South Korean actor. He made his debut in the 1976 play Naughty in the West.

== Filmography ==
=== Television series ===
| Year | Title | Role | Ref. |
|---|---|---|---|
| 2014 | Land of Gold | President Lee | |
| 2014 | Reset | Mr.Oh | |
| 2015 | D-Day | Lee Hae Sung's patient | |
| 2016 | Pied Piper | Shin Won Chang | |
| 2016 | Blow Breeze | Mr.Yoo | |
| 2017 | Saimdang, Memoir of Colors | Min-woo | |
| 2017 | Andante | Han-young | |
| 2018 | The Ghost Detective | Grandpa's Ghost | |
| 2018 | Sky Castle | Elder at Soo-chang's Cabin | |
| 2019 | Special Labor Inspector | Testified of injuries to Industrial Accident Compensation Comm | |
| 2019 | Diary of a Prosecutor | Ryu-jin | |
| 2020 | Hi Bye, Mama! | Mr.Choe | |
| 2021 | Racket Boys | Ki Jeom Duk's husband | |
| 2021 | Revolutionary Sisters | Grandfather | |
| 2021 | School 2021 | Oh Jang-seok | |
| 2022 | From Now On, Showtime! | Mr. Bae | |
| 2022 | If You Wish Upon Me | Zookeeper | |
| 2022 | Stock Struck | Monk | |
| 2023 | Poong, the Joseon Psychiatrist Season 2 | Second state councilor's uncle | |
| 2023 | The Secret Romantic Guesthouse | Muk-soe | |
| 2024 | Seoul Busters | Victim | |
| 2025 | The Queen Who Crowns | Mu-hak | |

=== Film ===
| Year | Title | Role | Notes | Ref. |
|---|---|---|---|---|
| 1992 | Kim's War | Innkeeper | | |
| 1992 | Our Twisted Hero | Kim Young-pal | | |
| 1995 | The Eternal Empire | Hyun Seung-heon | | |
| 1995 | Mom, The Star and The Sea Anemone | Detective | | |
| 1995 | A Hot Roof | SWAT deputy | | |
| 1996 | Do You Believe in Jazz | Mr. Jang | | |
| 1998 | Girls' Night Out | Real estate mister | | |
| 1998 | First Kiss | Elevator man | | |
| 1999 | Calla | Mr. Yeong | | |
| 1999 | A Great Chinese Restaurant | Chunjang farm manager | | |
| 2000 | Ditto | Security Guard | | |
| 2003 | Show Show Show | Headman | | |
| 2004 | A Moment to Remember | Executive director Park | | |
| 2007 | My Tutor Friend 2 | Professor | | |
| 2008 | Life is Beautiful | Police Officer Jo | | |
| 2008 | Summer Whispers | Market Owner | | |
| 2008 | Heartbreak Library | Old Guard | | |
| 2009 | The Sword with No Name | Go Jong's eunuch | | |
| 2009 | Jeon Woo-chi: The Taoist Wizard | Homeless person | | |
| 2010 | A Barefoot Dream | Shin Young-hoon | | |
| 2011 | Always | Elder in rehab | | |
| 2011 | Sunday Punch | Governor | | |
| 2011 | Sea Without Water | Grandfather | | |
| 2013 | Door to the Night | Principal Kim | | |
| 2014 | Breath | Mr. Hyun | | |
| 2014 | Innocent Thing | Guard | | |
| 2014 | My Dictator | Village foreman | | |
| 2015 | The Sound of a Flower | Government Official | | |
| 2017 | Another Way | Buddhist monk | | |
| 2018 | The Soup | Barber | | |
| 2019 | Race to Freedom: Um Bok Dong | Oil Shop Owner | | |
| 2020 | Innocence | Ji Young-deok | | |

== Awards and nominations ==
- 2005 Korean Theater Actors Association Actor of the Year
- 2008 The 12th Hector Theater Awards Theatrical Award of the Year
- 2009 Yomiuri Theatrical Awards Male Actor Award

Name of the award ceremony, year presented, category, nominee of the award, and the result of the nomination
| Award ceremony | Year | Category | Nominee / Work | Result | Ref. |
|---|---|---|---|---|---|
| SBS Drama Awards | 2021 | Best Supporting Team (Note: with Kim Min-ki, Lee Ji-won, Jung Min-seong, Kim Kang-hoon, Cha Mi-kyung and Shin Cheol-jin) | Racket Boys | Won | |
