= Racket Boys =

2021 South Korean sports drama

- Promotional poster
- Hangul: 라켓소년단
- Hanja: 라켓少年團
- RR: Raket sonyeondan
- MR: Rak'et sonyŏndan
- Genre: Drama; Sports
- Created by: StudioS (SBS)
- Written by: Jung Bo-hun
- Directed by: Jo Young-kwang; Ahn Jong-yeon
- Starring: Kim Sang-kyung; Oh Na-ra; Tang Jun-sang; Son Sang-yeon; Choi Hyun-wook; Kim Kang-hoon; Lee Jae-in; Lee Ji-won; Kim Min-gi
- Composer: Park Se-joon (MD)
- Country of origin: South Korea
- Original language: Korean
- No. of episodes: 16

Production
- Executive producers: Park Young-soo (SBS); Lee Joo-hoo
- Producers: Kim Hee-yeol; Park Sang-hyeon; Jeong Sang-yang
- Running time: 60–86 minutes
- Production companies: Studio S (SBS); Pan Entertainment
- Budget: ₩6.4 billion

Original release
- Network: SBS TV
- Release: May 31 – August 9, 2021

Racket Boys (Korean: 라켓소년단) is a 2021 South Korean television drama. The series, directed by Cho Young-kwang and written by Jung Bo-hun, stars Kim Sang-kyung, Oh Na-ra, Tang Jun-sang, Son Sang-yeon, Choi Hyun-wook, Kim Kang-hoon, Lee Jae-in, Lee Ji-won, and Kim Min-gi. The series follows the growth of sixteen-year-old boys and girls, and the challenges faced by the badminton club at their school. It premiered on SBS TV on May 31, 2021 and aired every Monday and Tuesday at 22:00 (KST). The series is available worldwide on Netflix for streaming.

== Synopsis ==
A city kid is brought to the countryside by his father's new coaching gig — reviving a ragtag middle school badminton team on the brink of extinction. A story of a boys' badminton team at a middle school in Haenam as they grow, both as people and as players.

Yoon Hyun Jong was once a good badminton player, but now he struggles to make ends meet for his family. Therefore, he jumps at a chance to coach a middle school team, only to find it on the verge of disbandment with only three players: Bang Yoon Dam, Na Woo Chan, and Lee Yong Tae. The three boys struggle along, improving as Yoon Hae Kang, Yoon Hyun Jong's son, joins the team along with Jung In Sol. Now having enough players to enter competitions, they try to soar to new heights.

Meanwhile, Ra Young Ja, former top badminton player and Yoon Hyun Jong's wife, is the coach of the girls' badminton team at a girl's middle school in Haenam. On her team are Han Se Yoon, the #1 ranked junior female player in Korea and Lee Han Sol, Se Yoon's best friend, allowing them to be one of the best teams among their peers.

== Cast ==
=== Main ===
- Kim Sang-kyung as Yoon Hyun Jong: Father of Hae-kang, and a badminton coach who moves to the countryside to earn more money.
- Oh Na-ra as Ra Yeong-ja: Mother of Yoon Hae-kang and Yoon Hae-in, a living legend in the badminton world, and a junior high school coach. She is also known as "Ranos" for her go-by-the-book attitude.
- Tang Jun-sang as Yoon Hae-kang: An ex-badminton prodigy and baseball enthusiast, who starts playing badminton again after moving to the countryside.
- Son Sang-yeon as Bang Yoon-dam: The captain of the badminton club and their ace player. He wants to have 100,000 followers on Instagram. He is quite handsome.
- Choi Hyun-wook as Na Woo-chan: A mediator who mediates conflicts between congregations with a mediating personality and excellent empathy.
- Kim Kang-hoon as Lee Yong-tae: The youngest member of the badminton club, and a big fan of badminton player Lee Yong-dae.
- Lee Jae-in as Han Se-yoon: A badminton player who dreams of becoming the youngest member of the national team.
- Lee Ji-won as Lee Han-sol: A student and a talented badminton player. She has a crush on Bang Yoon-Dam.
- Kim Min-gi as Jeong In-sol: Classmate of Hae-kang, Yoon-dam and Woo-chan. He is the class president and gets excellent grades, but yearns to play badminton with his new friends.

=== Supporting ===
- Ahn Se-bin as Yoon Hae-in: Yoon Hae-kang's little sister, who is cute and feisty like her mother. She is also independent and outgoing, and, in addition, has asthma
- Jung Min-seong as Kim Tae-ho: Husband of a city couple, timid and caring.
- Park Hyo-joo as Shin Phil-ja: Wife of a city couple. Kim Tae-ho and Shin Phil-ja are a typical urban couple who have been married for 10 years. They move to Haenam so they could leave the busy city life.
- Shin Jung-geun as Coach Bae: A PET at Haenam Seo Middle School, and a badminton coach also known as "White Wolf".
- Woo Hyun as Hong Yi-jang: The head of the village and the youth president.
- Baek Ji-won as Shin Song-hee: A lady who claims to be a guardian of the territorial village.
- Shin Cheol-jin as Grandfather
- Cha Mi-kyung as Grandma Oh-mae
- Kim Ki-cheon as principal of Haenam Seo Middle School
- Song Seung-hwan as Lee Seung-heon: A player in the National Spring Badminton League.
- Ahn Sang-woo as Mr. No: A badminton store owner.
- Ahn Nae-sang as Fang: A national team coach.
- Yoon Hyun-soo as Park Chan: A badminton player that has a crush on Se-yoon.
- Hong Seo-joon as Chairman Jung: In-sol's father.
- Song Seung-hwan as Lee Seung-heon: A middle school badminton player.

=== Special appearances ===
- Kim Min-seok as Hun-hoon

Takes Grandma Oh-mae from the subway station to Father's Table restaurant in spite of his busy schedule (ep.2).

- Park Ho-san as Park Sun-bae

Yoon Hyeon-jong's friend (ep.1).

- Jonathan Thona as Jonathan

An exchange student and GFriend's fan (ep.1).

- Jo Jae-ryong as a restaurant owner (ep. 2)
- Park Ok-hool as Bang Yoon-dam's mother
- Kim Tae-hyang as Bang Yong-shik

Bang Yoon-dam's father, who is very supportive of his son. It is evident that Yoon-dam is his favorite child as he makes his children eat Yoon-Dam's favorite food every single day.

- Choi Dae-hoon as a reporter for a badminton magazine
- Yoon Bong-gil as a baseball coach
- Im Chul-hyung as Woo-chan's father

A military man and a father with an iron fist. Initially, he disapproves of his son's passion for badminton.

- Jo Ryeon as Woo-chan's mother
- Kim Sung-cheol as General Secretary Park
- Ko Soo-bin as Ivana Putri

An Indonesia's badminton player (ep. 5).

- Park Hae-soo as Lee Jae-joon

He has been exercising with Yoon Hyeon-jong since childhood (ep. 6).

- Lee Jun-hyeok as Banjang Yu (ep. 6)
- Kwon Dong-ho as college coach for Hyeon-jong and Jae-joon (ep. 6)
- Ki Eun-se as Lee Yu-ri

A former badminton national team player, and coach of Seoul Jeil Girls' Middle School badminton team, in rivalry with Haenam Jeil Girls' Middle School coach Ra Young-ja (Ep.7, 8).

- Jo Deok-hoe as a disciple of director Bae
- Jo Jae-yoon as a comic performer in 'The End of the Earth Avengers' (Ep.7, 8, 14)
- Seo Do-jin as a comic performer in 'The End of the Earth Avengers' (Ep.7, 8)
- Lee Si-eon as a Busan citizen (Ep.9)
- Heo Sung-tae as Coach Cheon (Ep.10)
- Jung Hee-tae as Hong Jeong-hyeon

The younger brother of Hong Yi-jang.

- Lee Yong-dae as himself (Ep.15)
- Kang Seung-yoon as Kang Tae-seon

A former badminton youth national team player. He used to be a badminton player at Haenam Seo Middle School (Ep.12-16).

- Kim Jung-young as Seon-yeong

Coach Bae's wife.

- Lee Seok-hyung as Lee Kyung-min

A former national badminton player and a senior of Kang Tae-seon.

- Seo Dong-won as Dong-hwi (Ep.15)
- Kwon Yu-ri as Im Seo-hyun (Ep.16)

A national badminton player, the person Han Se-yoon considered as a role model.

- Lee Kyu-hyung as Park Jung-hwan (Ep.16)
- Kim Seul-gi as Jang PD (Ep.16)
- Jo Jung-shik as an SBC news anchor (Ep.16)
- Kim Ji-young as Ah-young (Ep.16)

== Production ==
=== Casting ===
Tang Jun-sang was invited to star in the sports drama on November 30, 2020. The cast of the series, Tang Jun-sang, Kim Kang-hoon, Oh Na-ra and Kim Sang-kyung, was confirmed on January 26, 2021. Lee Jae-in joined the cast on February 25, 2021, while Park Hyo-joo joined in March 2021. On March 25, the production company Pan Entertainment announced that with six boys and girls; Jun-sang Tang, Sang-yeon Sang, Choi Hyun-wook, Kang-hoon Kim, Jae-in Lee, and Ji-won Lee, the lineup of players was completed. Kim Sang-kyung and Baek Ji-won appeared together in the 2019 office themed drama, Miss Lee.

=== Preparation ===
Tang Jun-sang mentioned in an interview that all the cast members who play badminton all trained extensively for months prior to filming in order to get the right forms and techniques. Kang Seung-yoon (Kang Tae-seon) also admitted in a behind-the-scenes video uploaded on the SBS Catch Youtube channel that he also took badminton lessons as he plays a top player in the drama. However, there was never a scene where he was seen playing the sport.

=== Filming ===
Principal photography began on January 30, 2021. On April 21, 2021 SBS released images of script reading. The filming locations of the series are Gangneung, Gangwon Province, Miryang and South Gyeongsang Province.

== Episodes ==
| No. | Title | Directed by | Written by | Original release date | South Korea viewers (millions) |
|---|---|---|---|---|---|
| 1 | "Episode 1" | Cho Young-kwang | Jung Bo-hun | May 31, 2021 | 1.161 |
Yoon Hyeon-jong (Kim Sang-kyung), a badminton coach and a devoted father is struggling to meet his family expenses. Yoon Hae-kang (Tang Jun-sang), his son a baseball enthusiast fails to go to baseball camp as they could not pay the fees. Hae-In, his daughter has asthma and allergic to dust. So in February 2021, when he gets an offer for coaching, the family relocates, from Seoul to Ttangkkeut village in Haenam. Hyeon-jong finds that the school team is in shambles, there are only three members; Bang Yoon-dam, Yong-Tae and Na Woo-chan. To enter into competitions they need a fourth player. Hae-kang, who was a badminton prodigy and juniors champion, but now plays baseball, reluctantly joins the team. They lose Sweet Potato competition, but decide to focus on the next Spring competition to win it. In Sweet Potato competition they meet Ra Yeong-ja (Oh Na-ra), world and junior high school coach, called as "Ranos", and national athlete Se-Yoon who was competing in the female badminton team. In the evening the home gets crowded, when Yeong-ja and the two girls from the badminton team arrive as Yeong-ja happens to be Hae-In's mother. As the episode ends, Racket Boys learn line up for next competition, prompting them to prepare harder to meet the competition.
| 2 | "Episode 2" | Cho Young-kwang | Jung Bo-hun | June 1, 2021 | 1.007 |
The episode opens with boys starting new term in the school. The boys practice their badminton skills and when Hae-kang mentions the name of Jae-Seok, who used to be part of their foursome others leave. Jae-Seok has left them for Seoul without even saying bye. In Haenam, Tollgate bullies beat up Lee Yong-tae (Kim Kang-hoon). Hae-kang dashes back to the internet cafe to confront them. In an alley Hae-kang first tells them what they've done wrong and then lashes out at them. In village, a city couple arrives. Hyeon-jong gets wind of a legendary coach named the "white wolf", curious he sets out to explore. He soon finds out that head coach Bae (Shin Jung-geun), in fact, is "white wolf". Coach Bae scolds Yoon-dam, the only one who didn't go with the boys to face bullies. He reminds them that they're a team and they must act together. In Spring competition the Racket Boys face their old teammate Jae-seok. In draws Jae-seok and Hae-kang wind up facing each other on the court. The episode ends with the game coming up to a single point between them, Hae-kang ready to face a serve that could be decider of this game, certainly a cliffhanger.
| 3 | "Episode 3" | Cho Young-kwang | Jung Bo-hun | June 7, 2021 | 1.206 |
Jae-Seok defeated by Hae-kang, explains that his mom made him transfer to Seoul. As an apology he buys noodles for all of them. Hae-kang's old baseball coach meets him and encourages him to play again. Se-Yoon is struggling with the expectation of all, before her International competition at New Zealand. The estranged relationship between mother and son is cleared, when Hyeon-jong explains to Hae-kang that at the peak of her career she gave up the Olympics and retired as she got pregnant and choose to have baby. She admitted that it was the best decision she made, even better than winning the Olympics. In New Zealand Se-yoon watches pep videos including Hae-kang's, his message feels heartfelt as he apologizes for past misunderstandings. He reminds her of their childhood conversation and tells her it's okay to lose. Se-yoon wins in New Zealand and on return to Korea have a heart to heart talk with Hae-kang. On her advice he fakes illness to patch up with his mother. Jung In-sol comes over to boarding house to help raise average score of players. Soon, they all head out and start taking pictures, Hae-kang is beaming as he is enjoying with his extended family.
| 4 | "Episode 4" | Cho Young-kwang | Jung Bo-hun | June 8, 2021 | 1.035 |
The episode opens with Hae-kang's junior training program of 2016. The scene then merges to Hae-kang's present situation. It's tournament time, but team has no budget for it. Coach Bae arranges an advance amount against funding. On the night before the match, coach Yoon Hyeon-jong gets drunk and misses the time for the match in the morning. In-sol wants to play badminton, but his father, who is a councilor, asks Yoon Hyeon-jong to make his son quit the game and in return he will arrange for finding. Jeong In-sol joins the team. While watching TV, Hae-In gets acute seizure, as Hae-kang has gone to market, the other boys carry her to the hospital on their back and save her life. Yoon Hyeon-jong learns that Coach Bae arranged the advance amount from his salary. Hae-kang takes the other boys to Grandma Oh-mae's playroom to play games and enjoy the WiFi. Finally he has accepted them as his friends.
| 5 | "Episode 5" | Cho Young-kwang | Jung Bo-hun | June 14, 2021 | 1.218 |
The boys begin training for doubles with boys from Hwasun Oseong and neighbouring universities. Yoon-dam and Hae-kang teamed up together but don't gel on the court. Se-Yoon continues to get training rigorously for an upcoming match in Jakarta, Indonesia. Mr Hong informs that he has a long-standing rivalry in annual sports meet with Mr Bang and wants a runner for relay race with 4 racers from 4 different age groups. In doubles match Hwasun wins the match, making Yoon-dam and Hae-kang upset over their loss. In the doubles match against university boys Yoon-dam and Hae-kang get the rhythm and gel together and finally get over their differences. In Jakarta, Se-yoon wins her match against Indonesia's Ivana Putri in spite of partisan crowd. In the relay race Se-yoon takes over the final baton and runs to victory. When Se-yoon thanks Yong-tae for giving her herbal medicine for headaches, he informs her that it was Hae-kang who is responsible for helping her out with the medicine. Mutual liking for each other is apparent as they volunteer to pick potatoes together. They continue to walk without expressing it in words.
| 6 | "Episode 6" | Cho Young-kwang | Jung Bo-hun | June 15, 2021 | .960 |
To escape the intense training boys decide to run away, so pooling their resources, except Yoon-dam, other 4 boys take the bus to Gwangju. On return they find that they don't have enough money for return journey, as Yong-Tae couldn't find the money envelope. Realising that they need to get jobs to pay their way, they take jobs at a construction site. Jun-yeong advises them not to listen to adults, and helmet wearing is not desirable. Hae-kang is saved at the last second from a falling wrench, and they learn the importance of safety helmet. At the end of the day the boys realised that they have been scammed by site foreman. Hyeon-jong meets his old buddy Jae-joon as they reminisced their training days as they watched young talent exerting themselves. Se-yoon and Hae-kang keep avoiding their true feelings. The kids put on a beautiful party for Hae-in as per her wish list, as a seven years old, but she longed for same age friend. Eventually she spends quality time with young Chae-yeon, who is vacationing in the village. The draw for the 64th National Competition is released and the boys realised that they have to train hard to advance in competition.
| 7 | "Episode 7" | Cho Young-kwang | Jung Bo-hun | June 21, 2021 | 1.173 |
A day before the competition, Hae-kang takes up a set of grueling exercises for endurance. Han-sol is harassed during her doubles match by linesman, who incidentally was her ex-crush. This infuriates her doubles partner Yoon-dam and he knocks the man down, resulting in his disqualification from the single matches. Yong-tae wins his match despite being nervous. Hae-kang wins his match against his arch-rival Sun-gyun (the blond guy). Hae-kang loses against Park Chan and Se-yoon loses to Na-Ra. Although outwardly Hae-kang, Se-yoon and coach Ra Yeong-ja pretend that they are okay but inwardly they are disturbed. As coach Ra and Se-yoon discuss her future plans, coach Ra tells her that it is okay to lose sometime. The racket boys discuss Hae-kang's future and earlier visit of baseball coach. Whether he's going to take the offer and return to play baseball or not. Hae-kang heads up to the roof where he finds Se-Yoon holding out, but seeing Hae-kang, she start sobbing and leans on him for comfort. Finally the pent up emotions burst out.
| 8 | "Episode 8" | Cho Young-kwang | Jung Bo-hun | June 22, 2021 | 1.088 |
In the village the wall mural is vandalised with writing "Mind your own business" over it. A fire blazes in the woods nearby as the hiker from city flicks the cigarette over pine leaves. The residents put out the fire. Coach Hyeon-jong meets coach Fang (Ahn Nae-sang) and recommends Yoon-Dam for the National Badminton Team. Hae-kang twists his ankle in practice match, much to the delight of Seung-heon. Yoon-dam wins his match while, Yong-tae loses. Na Woo-chan surrenders his doubles match due to shoulder injury. Woo-chan's father, who was first time watching his match leaves his prejudices and encourages him to keep fighting. Se-yoon destroys Na-Ra avenging her defeat of the last match. Hae-kang wins his game against Seung-Heon hands down, destroying the arrogant. Coach Fang confirms that he is going to pick Yoon-dam and Hae-kang for the National team. At hospital coach Hyeon-jong learns that Hae-kang has badly sprained his ankle and he needs plaster for three weeks. Hae-kang gets jealous when Se-yoon gets a message from Park Chan to go out with him. When Lee Han-sol asks her if she is going out with him, she casts a glance at Hae-kang, and the episode ends.
| 9 | "Episode 9" | Cho Young-kwang | Jung Bo-hun | June 28, 2021 | 1.149 |
Racket Boys go under rigorous training in the National Juniors Athletes Camp, getting ready for playing the Japanese competitors the following day. They go for mountain training where coming down, Hae-kang retrieves Se-yoon's shoe going down the stream. Village Chief calls for a brainstorming meeting for ideas to revitalize their village. The city couple give the suggestions to cultivate regional food and use technology to market it. They can give empty houses to townfolk for staying. Back at the training camp, the boys sneak out to karaoke bar. When they are caught sneaking in they are told that they're going to be disqualified if they don't win in the morning. The Korean boys win against the Japanese. Afterwards, the girls go on date with boys. Hae-kang and Se-yoon go to the shore, where Hae-kang requests a Busan guy to take their picture. In evening, all of them gather to play a game of liar together. The coach Fang taking round, catches them and punishes them to run laps. Hae-kang and Se-yoon hiding in the closet escape being caught. Hae-kang asks her about Park Chan. He didn't ask Se-yoon out but will do when he wins the junior championship. Hae-kang tells her he's going to win, so it won't happen. She asks him to keep that promise, as the episode closes.
| 10 | "Episode 10" | Cho Young-kwang | Jung Bo-hun | June 29, 2021 | 1.036 |
Coach Fang finds Hae-kang in the closet. Hae-kang is diagnosed with hyphema because of hit with the shuttlecock at the tournament. Hyeon-jong informs the boys in private, that Hae-kang won't be competing in the preliminaries. Hyeon-jong meets his old friend Yang-Su in the hope of getting his money back. Hae-kang chooses National badminton player as his career. Racket boys and family celebrate Hyeon-jong's 47th birthday. The villagers gather for dinner and the movie Train to Busan with Big Grandma to celebrate her 90th birthday. It is shown that White Wolf, 10 years back used violence on a promising player, Kang Tae-seon, who dropped out due to trauma.
| 11 | "Episode 11" | Cho Young-kwang | Jung Bo-hun | July 5, 2021 | 1.007 |
The Racket Boys are trying to find the truth about the rumours concerning the White Wolf. The past of city couple and what brought them to the countryside is shown in flashbacks. They find themselves helping the villagers including senior citizens. The couple found their purpose in the village and the secret of good life, 'helping others brings happiness rather than getting help. Friendships and romance is building among Han-sol and Yoon-dam and Se-yoon and Hae-kang. Park Chan shows up to see Se-yoon, which makes Hae-kang jealous. A hilarious homework for Hae-in, where she has to express what love is, finds everyone putting hand gestures to make heart shape. Hyeon-jong is inquiring more about the White Wolf. He receives a call telling him to speak to coach Noh (Badminton goods shop owner). He's the one who was there back then. The draft matches take place and the final outcome depends on last match. Hwasung kids are grilled hard by coach Chan, and they are over exerted. Yong-tae offers Eun-ho encouraging words and ends up telling him about Hae-kang's eye. Eun-Ho gives this information to his coach, who uses this against Hae-kang in the match. As the game continues, Yong-tae gets upset by his friend's betrayal, and tears start rolling down his cheeks.
| 12 | "Episode 12" | Cho Young-kwang | Jung Bo-hun | July 6, 2021 | 1.151 |
After the draft match, there is tensions between Yong-tae and Hae-kang. Hyeong-jong finds a cigarette outside the gym. Hae-kang tells his concerns to Big Gran and Se-yoon. Ms Shin tells him a story of her mother, which clears the confusion and Hae-kang speaks to Yong-tae under the willow truth tree and forgives him. In-sol and Hae-kang play-off match goes all the way to match point with Hae-kang winning. It turns out that coach Bae was not the one who beat the boys 10 years ago, but it actually was coach Chun. Coach Bae was forced to take the blame for Chun. Big Gran gets her power of speech back at her last moment and apologizes to Ms Shin before breathing her last. At the funeral everyone celebrates Big Gran's life. Just then, Shin's family shows up. The funeral brings back memories for Yeong-ja too, who won a gold medal for her mother, but she died before seeing her triumph. As Yeong-Ja lets her emotions out, she hugs the entire Racket boys family. Shin Phil-Ja shows up with food and admits that she helped Big Gran write out her will, which bequeath all her assets to Miss Shin. Sharing their thoughts, the pair grow closer. In the middle of night Yong-tae sneaks out, the other boys believing that he's smoking but it turns out that a goddess girl from Heanem Middle School is calling him every night and wants to go to movies with him.
| 13 | "Episode 13" | Cho Young-kwang | Jung Bo-hun | July 12, 2021 | 1.091 |
It is vacation time for the boys and girls. But, they are not thrilled as they know there will be intense training. Coach Ra is not pleased because World Championship and NJSF are on the same day, making it difficult for Se-yoon to play in both competitions. While playing different games, Hae-kang and Park-chan compete. In evening when Se-yoon loses and is asked to go to bring fruits, Park-chan wishes to accompany her. Their evening stroll is disturbed by Hae-kang, where he tells Se-yoon his feelings for her. Se-yoon and Hae-kang both tell the scout that they will not go to Seoul. Coach Bae goes on vacation but Yoon-dam is not happy with it. The Racket Boys cheer Han-sol, as she plays her singles match. She misses Se-yoon but doesn't show it. In Bangkok, playing World Championship match against New Zealand girl, Se-yoon plays hard and wins her games in record time as she wants to rush home in time to play in the NJSF. She has invited her mother to watch her play for the first time. But, bad weather delays her flight and she is stuck at airport.
| 14 | "Episode 14" | Cho Young-kwang | Jung Bo-hun | July 19, 2021 | 1.059 |
Se-Yoon and coach Fang are trying to reach stadium driving through heavy traffic. In the absence of Se-yoon, it falls on Han-sol to lead the team. Her game in final match with Korea number 2, Lee Na-ra is 1-1, her coach advises her to remember the person she cares most and play, the miracle happens as Han-sol wins the match! The Racket Boys have an altercation with baseball team, which ends in Hae-kang handing his new flip phone to them. The next day, in the semi-finals the stadium is half empty but the villagers show up with drums and signs, ready to cheer the boys on. Hae-kang and Yoon-dam win their doubles match, while Hae-kang wins against Seung-heon. When the villagers reach home, they learn about a big development project of a golf course on the village land. The episode ends with the coach Hyeon-jong getting the news from the hospital that the knee ligament damage of key players is worsening. And then, Hae-kang comes to tell that he is not able to see with his right eye.
| 15 | "Episode 15" | Cho Young-kwang | Jung Bo-hun | July 26, 2021 | 1.188 |
Kang Tae-seon (Kang Seung-yoon) is nervous for his comeback. Coach Hyeon-jong is worried as his key players are in the injured list. On the day of the finals of Jeonnam Vs Seoul, coach Hyeon-jong gives his boys a pep talk. In first match Yong-tae is pitied against Jae-seok. Jae-Seok wins the first game, which makes Yong-tae nervous. Taking a short break he goes out. In the hallway he runs into Yong-dae, their talk puts confidence into him. Changing his game plan he wins the match. Next match Yoon-dam wins after giving a little scare mid-match, when he faints. In the village, the shady developers continue to convince the villagers to put their seal on deed to grab their land. Which ended in fiasco for them. At the tournament, the coaches discuss the game plan of coach Hyeon-jong, which has put Jeonnam in driving seat. Eun-ho is matched up against Park-chan while Hae-kang is part of the doubles match. Already ahead by 2-0 it gives Jeonnam outright chance to win tournament.
| 16 | "Episode 16" | Cho Young-kwang | Jung Bo-hun | August 9, 2021 | 1.009 |
The finale episode opens with doubles match. Hae-kang and Woo-chan of Jeonnam Vs Park Chan and friend of Seoul. 3rd game of the match goes all the way to 29-29 with Racket Boys winning last point and thereby the competition. After winning, Hae-kang admits his feelings to Se-yoon. The boys reflecting on the athletes of the country remember Im Seo-hyeon, whom Se-yeon looks up as her idol. Next comes Hae-kang's draft match against Tae-seon of Jeonnam Sports Council, which Hae-kang loses. Time passes as the series takes a leap into 2022. Yong-tae grows from student to 'junior coach' helping a group of youngsters to learn discipline. In the village, demand for sweet potatoes is growing. A newman Park Jeong-Hwan, arrives from the city to stay there with his loved one. In the interview Hyeon-Jong gets emotional and thanks the boys for making him feel really good about himself. The episode and series closes with the badminton games continuing as it cuts forward to a summer competition in Seoul. In-sol's father is cheering his son as he plays a doubles match. On another court, Se-yoon and Hae-kang, with coach Hyeon-jong on their side, is beginning their doubles match against Yoon-dam and Han-sol, with coach Ra Yeong-ja siding with them.

== Original soundtrack ==
Racket Boys

Soundtrack album by Various
- Released: 2021
- Genre: Soundtrack
- Languages: Korean; English
- Labels: Music & New Co., Ltd.; Pan Entertainment

=== Part 1 ===
Released on June 1, 2021
| No. | Title | Lyrics | Music | Artist | Length |
|---|---|---|---|---|---|
| 1. | "Will Be" (지금처럼; Like Now) | HONEY NOISE | HONEY NOISE | The Boyz | 3:03 |
| 2. | "Will Be" (Inst.) | | HONEY NOISE | | 3:03 |

=== Part 2 ===
Released on June 15, 2021
| No. | Title | Lyrics | Music | Artist | Length |
|---|---|---|---|---|---|
| 1. | "Focus on Me" (커피소년) | Coffee Boy | Coffee Boy | Coffee Boy | 3:40 |
| 2. | "Focus on Me" (Inst.) | | Coffee Boy | | 3:40 |

=== Part 3 ===
Released on June 29, 2021
| No. | Title | Lyrics | Music | Artist | Length |
|---|---|---|---|---|---|
| 1. | "I Love You Teacher" (선생님 사랑해요) | Lee Do-yeon | Choi Joon-young | Oh My Girl (Hyojung, Mimi, Binnie) | 3:49 |
| 2. | "I Love You Teacher" (Inst.) | | Choi Joon-young | | 3:49 |

=== Part 4 ===
Released on July 6, 2021
| No. | Title | Lyrics | Music | Artist | Length |
|---|---|---|---|---|---|
| 1. | "Find Me" (나를 찾아서) | Park Se-jun; Woo Ji-hoon | Park Se-jun; Woo Ji-hoon | Lim Dan-woo | 3:51 |
| 2. | "Find Me" (Inst.) | | Park Se-jun; Woo Ji-hoon | | 3:51 |

=== Part 5 ===
Released on July 13, 2021
| No. | Title | Lyrics | Music | Artist | Length |
|---|---|---|---|---|---|
| 1. | "Cloud" | 0308 | 0308 | Park Ji-won (fromis 9) | 3:51 |
| 2. | "Cloud" (Inst.) | | | | 3:51 |

== Reception ==
Kim Hee-kyung writing for Hankyung opined that the drama is fresh in respect that it is 'bringing liveliness and tension at the same time'. Praising the directing technique, Hee-kyung wrote, "He [the director] uses his cartoon imagination to draw white wolves and bears with computer graphics." She felt that the game scenes were portrayed realistically, and to stress on the players and present a dramatic atmosphere, voices and lights were removed.

=== Controversy ===
Episode 5 drew outrage from Indonesian netizens due to its negative portrayal of the country and its people as being cheaters and lacking in sportsmanship. Some of the dialogue between the main characters about the country and the wide gap in score between Han Se-yoon from Korea and Ivana Putri from Indonesia (21-7, 21-9) were also considered insulting given that, at the time of broadcast, a number of Indonesian badminton players were leading in world rankings while South Korean players were several places behind, leading to many accusing SBS of racism. In response to the backlash, SBS released an apology on their official Instagram account over the way the country had been portrayed.

== Viewership ==
Racket Boys : South Korea viewers per episode (thousands)

| Season | Episode number | | | | | | | | | | | | | | | | Average |
| Season | 1 | 2 | 3 | 4 | 5 | 6 | 7 | 8 | 9 | 10 | 11 | 12 | 13 | 14 | 15 | 16 | Average |
|---|---|---|---|---|---|---|---|---|---|---|---|---|---|---|---|---|---|
| 1 | 1161 | 1007 | 1206 | 1035 | 1218 | 960 | 1173 | 1088 | 1149 | 1036 | 1007 | 1151 | 1091 | 1059 | 1188 | 1009 | 1096 |

Source: Audience measurement performed nationwide by Nielsen Korea.

Average TV viewership ratings
| Ep. | Part | Original broadcast date | Average audience share | | |
| Ep. | Part | Original broadcast date | Nielsen Korea | | TNmS |
| Ep. | Part | Original broadcast date | Nationwide | Seoul | Nationwide |
|---|---|---|---|---|---|
| 1 | 1 | May 31, 2021 | 3.6% | —N/a | —N/a |
| 1 | 2 | May 31, 2021 | 5.7% | 5.9% | 6.0% |
| 1 | 3 | May 31, 2021 | 5.2% | 5.2% | 5.4% |
| 2 | 1 | June 1, 2021 | 4.0% | —N/a | —N/a |
| 2 | 2 | June 1, 2021 | 5.4% | 5.5% | 6.0% |
| 2 | 3 | June 1, 2021 | 4.7% | 4.8% | 4.9% |
| 3 | 1 | June 7, 2021 | 3.6% | —N/a | —N/a |
| 3 | 2 | June 7, 2021 | 5.8% | 6.1% | 6.0% |
| 4 | 1 | June 8, 2021 | 4.6% | —N/a | —N/a |
| 4 | 2 | June 8, 2021 | 5.2% | 5.3% | 5.4% |
| 4 | 3 | June 8, 2021 | 4.9% | 5.2% | 5.0% |
| 5 | 1 | June 14, 2021 | 4.3% | —N/a | 4.6% |
| 5 | 2 | June 14, 2021 | 6.2% | 6.2% | 6.0% |
| 6 | 1 | June 15, 2021 | 4.3% | —N/a | 4.5% |
| 6 | 2 | June 15, 2021 | 5.0% | 5.3% | 5.0% |
| 6 | 3 | June 15, 2021 | 4.7% | —N/a | 4.9% |
| 7 | 1 | June 21, 2021 | 4.5% | 4.8% | —N/a |
| 7 | 2 | June 21, 2021 | 5.9% | 6.5% | 6.1% |
| 8 | 1 | June 22, 2021 | 5.1% | 6.0% | 4.8% |
| 8 | 2 | June 22, 2021 | 5.5% | 6.1% | 5.4% |
| 9 | 1 | June 28, 2021 | 3.6% | —N/a | —N/a |
| 9 | 2 | June 28, 2021 | 5.4% | 5.8% | 5.6% |
| 10 | 1 | June 29, 2021 | 4.4% | 4.7% | 4.5% |
| 10 | 2 | June 29, 2021 | 5.1% | 5.5% | —N/a |
| 11 | Full (Note: The episode was aired in full as advertisements in middle were not allowed at that point of time.) | July 5, 2021 | 4.8% | 4.7% | 4.9% |
| 12 | Full | July 6, 2021 | 5.2% | 5.4% | 6.1% |
| 13 | Full | July 12, 2021 | 4.9% | 5.1% | 5.1% |
| 14 | Full | July 19, 2021 (Note: 'Racquet Boys' announced, "Due to the schedule change due to Corona 19 and issues with the Olympic program, we have decided to schedule it once a week." Therefore the 14th episode will be aired on July 19 instead of July 13.) | 5.1% | 5.4% | 5.1% |
| 15 | Full | July 26, 2021 | 5.6% | 5.7% | 5.0% |
| 16 | Full | August 9, 2021 (Note: It was announced that due to issues with the Olympic program, the broadcast of 16th episode on August 2 is cancelled. The finale episode will be aired on August 9.) | 4.6% | 4.3% | —N/a |
| Average | | | 4.9% | 5.2% | 5.0% |
In the table above, the blue numbers represent the lowest ratings and the red numbers represent the highest ratings.; N/A denotes that the rating is not known.

== Awards and nominations ==
Name of the award ceremony, year presented, category, nominee of the award, and the result of the nomination
| Award ceremony | Year | Category | Nominee | Result | Ref. |
|---|---|---|---|---|---|
| APAN Star Awards | 2022 | Best New Actor | Tang Jun-sang | Won | |
| APAN Star Awards | 2022 | Best New Actor | Choi Hyun-wook | Nominated | |
| Asia Contents Awards | 2022 | Best Writer | Jung Bo-hun | Nominated | |
| Baeksang Arts Awards | 2022 | Best New Actor | Tang Jun-sang | Nominated | |
| SBS Drama Awards | 2021 | Best Supporting Team | Kim Min-ki ,Lee Ji-won, Jung Min-seong; Kim Kang-hoon, Cha Mi-kyung and Shin Cheol-jin | Won | |
| SBS Drama Awards | 2021 | Best Young Actress | Lee Jae-in | Won | |
| SBS Drama Awards | 2021 | Best Young Actor | Tang Jun-sang | Won | |
| SBS Drama Awards | 2021 | Best New Actor | Choi Hyun-wook | Won | |
| SBS Drama Awards | 2021 | Best New Actor | Son Sang-yeon | Won | |
| SBS Drama Awards | 2021 | Best Character Award (Female) | Oh Na-ra | Won | |
| SBS Drama Awards | 2021 | Top Excellence Award, Actor in a Miniseries Genre/Fantasy Drama | Kim Sang-kyung | Nominated | |
| SBS Drama Awards | 2021 | Excellence Award for an Actress in a Mini-Series Genre/Fantasy Drama | Oh Na-ra | Nominated | |
| SBS Drama Awards | 2021 | Excellence Award for an Actress in a Mini-Series Genre/Fantasy Drama | Cha Mi-kyung | Nominated | |
| SBS Drama Awards | 2021 | Excellence Award for an Actor in a Mini-Series Genre/Fantasy Drama | Shin Jung-geun | Nominated | |
| SBS Drama Awards | 2021 | Scene Stealer Award | Heo Sung-tae | Nominated | |
