= The Soup (film) =

- Directed by: Lim Young-hoon
- Screenplay by: Lim Young-hoon
- Produced by: Choi Chang-gyu
- Starring: Shin Jung-geun; Yoon Park; Jang So-yeon; Go Na-hee
- Cinematography: Lee Hyun-soo
- Release dates: April 2017 (AIFF); 12 July 2018 (South Korea)
- Running time: 103 minutes
- Country: South Korea
- Language: Korean

The Soup (Korean: 식구; RR: Sikgu) is a 2017 South Korean family drama film starring Shin Jung-geun, Yoon Park, Jang So-yeon and Go Na-hee. Written and directed by Lim Young-hoon, it was based on the true story of an ex-convict who entered the home of a mentally disabled couple with a 7-year-old daughter, and ends up living with them. It premiered and was named Best Foreign Feature at the 26th Arizona International Film Festival 2017.

== Plot ==
Abandoned by his family due to his wrongdoings, ex-convict Jae-goo (Yoon Park) makes a living working as a construction worker. One day, he meets and approaches mentally disabled Soon-sik (Shin Jung-geun) at a funeral hall who let him spends the night at his house. The next morning Jae-goo leaves, but when Soon-sik comes home from work, he is startled to find Jae-goo at his home again.

== Cast ==
- Shin Jung-geun as Soon-sik
- Yoon Park as Jae-goo
- Jang So-yeon as Ae-shim
- Go Na-hee as Soon-young
- Kim Hyun as Landlady
- Gi Ju-bong as president
- Shin Cheol-jin as Barber
- Jung Kyu-soo as Head Seo
