= Lee Tae-hwan =

South Korean actor and singer

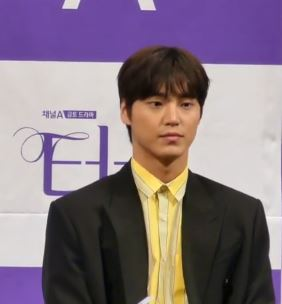
- Lee in January 2020
- Born: February 21, 1995 (age 31); Seoul, South Korea
- Education: Sungkyunkwan University - Acting Arts
- Occupations: Actor; singer; model
- Years active: 2013–present
- Agent: Man of Creation (M.O.C)

Korean name
- Hangul: 이태환
- Hanja: 李泰煥
- RR: I Taehwan
- MR: I T'aehwan

Lee Tae-hwan (Korean: 이태환; born February 21, 1995) is a South Korean actor, model and singer. Since his acting debut in 2013, he has starred in television dramas and web series, notably Pride and Prejudice (2014) and W. He is a member of 5urprise, being its only member to lack a stage name.

== Career ==
In 2013, at the age of eighteen, Lee Tae-hwan made his official acting debut in the short TV series titled After School: Lucky or Not together with the members of 5urprise. He next starred in High School King of Savvy, portraying an ice hockey player， and also played the younger version of Lee Deok-wa in the 2-episode SBS drama Wonderful Day in October.

In 2014, Lee starred in MBC drama Pride and Prejudice, where he played an investigator and former taekwondo athlete. Lee's then starred in his first period drama, Splendid Politics in which he played young Prince Gwanghae.

In 2016, Lee became known for his role in Come Back Mister, where he played a former gangster and bodyguard. He next starred in MBC fantasy thriller W, playing a martial arts instructor. The same year, he was cast in the Korean-Chinese web-drama Thumping Spike, where he played a volleyball captain. Lee also made his big screen debut in the Su Saek, a film depicting about the friendship among young men.

From 2016 to 2017, Lee was cast in MBC's weekend drama Father, I'll Take Care of You, a 50-episode family drama in which he portrayed one of the unmarried sons. He then starred in another weekend drama My Golden Life from 2017 to 2018, playing an industrial design student. The drama was a hit with over 40% ratings, and led to a rise in popularity for Lee.

In 2018, Lee was cast in tvN's romantic comedy drama What's Wrong with Secretary Kim, playing a famous author.

In 2019, Lee starred in SBS youth drama Farmers' Academy, playing a first year student at the Department of Food crops.

== Personal life ==
=== Military service ===
On June 21, 2022, Lee's agency announced that he will enlist for the mandatory military service on June 27 without disclosing the location and time.

== Filmography ==
=== Film ===
Year	Title	Role	Ref.
2016	Su Saek	Won-sun	
2023	Mount CHIAK	Jeong Isaac	

=== Television series ===
Year	Title	Role	Notes	Ref.
2014	Wonderful Day in October	young Lee Shin-jae		
2014	High School King of Savvy	Oh Tae-seok		
2014	Pride and Prejudice	Kang Soo		
2015	Splendid Politics	young Prince Gwanghae		
2016	Come Back Mister	Choi Seung-jae		
2016	W	Seo Do-yoon		
2016–2017	Father, I'll Take Care of You	Han Sung-joon		
2017–2018	My Golden Life	Sunwoo Hyuk		
2018	What's Wrong with Secretary Kim	Lee Sung-yeon		
2019	Farming Academy	Ha Joo-seok		
2020	Touch	Kang Do-jin		
2020	Graceful Friends	Joo Kang-san	Cameo (episode 1–4)	
2020–2021	Royal Secret Agent	Sung Yi-beom		
2022	Thirty-Nine	Park Hyun-joon		
2024	DNA Lover	Seo Kang-hoon		

=== Web series ===
Year	Title	Role	Ref.
2013	After School: Lucky or Not	Han Jae-hee	
2014	After School: Lucky or Not - Season 2	Han Jae-hee	
2016	Thumping Spike	Baek Woo Jin	
2026	Teach You a Lesson	Jang Kwon-Hyuk	

=== Television shows ===
Year	Title	Role	Notes	Ref.
2017	Living Together in Empty Room	Cast member	With Han Eun-jung and Block B's P. O (Episodes 8–11)	
2017	Law Of the Jungle in Komodo	Cast member	Episodes 278–282	
2019	Urban Cops	Cast member		
2019	Urban Cops: KCSI	Cast member		
2020	Sea Police 2	Cast member		
2022	All Table Tennis!	Cast member		

=== Web shows ===
Year	Title	Role	Ref.
2018	Photo People in Tokyo	Cast member	

== Awards and nominations ==
Name of the award ceremony, year presented, category, nominee of the award, and the result of the nomination
Award ceremony	Year	Category	Nominee / Work	Result	Ref.
Asia Model Awards	2011	Best New Model	—N/a	Won	
KBS Drama Awards	2017	Best New Actor	My Golden Life	Nominated	
MBC Drama Awards	2016	Best New Actor	W	Nominated	
