= Sea Police =

2018–2020 South Korean television program

- Promotional poster for Season 2
- Hangul: 바다경찰
- RR: Badagyeongchal
- MR: Padagyŏngch'al
- Genre: Reality show, Police
- Starring: Jo Jae-yoon; Kim Soo-ro (Season 1); Kwak Si-yang (Season 1); Yura (Season 1); Lee Beom-soo (Season 2); On Joo-wan (Season 2); Lee Tae-hwan (Season 2)
- Country of origin: South Korea
- Original language: Korean
- No. of seasons: 2
- No. of episodes: 11

Production
- Production location: South Korea
- Running time: 90 minutes

Original release
- Network: MBC every1
- Release: August 13, 2018 – December 30, 2020

Related
- Rural Police; Urban Cops

Sea Police (Korean: 바다경찰; RR: Badagyeongchal) is a South Korean reality show broadcast on MBC every1, where celebrities join the Korean Coast Guard to experience their work protecting coastal waters and communities. The show is the first spin-off of Rural Police, which features a similar premise focused on police centres in the countryside. Like the original series, the cast act in the capacity of an entry-level police officer (Korean: 순경; RR: sungyeong) alongside mentor police officers in their assigned Coast Guard substation.

Season 1 aired on Mondays at 20:30 (KST) from August 13 to September 10, 2018. It was filmed in Seo-gu, Busan, South Gyeongsang-do with an all-new cast separate from Rural Police.

Season 2 aired on Wednesdays at 22:20 (KST) from November 25 to December 30, 2020, with Jo Jae-yoon returning to the cast alongside Lee Tae-hwan from the second spin-off Urban Cops and two new members. It was filmed at Nohwa Island (Nohwado) in Wando County, South Jeolla-do.

== Cast ==
=== Main cast ===
Season 1	Season 2
Kim Soo-ro	Lee Beom-soo
Jo Jae-yoon
Kwak Si-yang	On Joo-wan
Yura	Lee Tae-hwan

=== Coast Guard officers ===
Season	Location	Officers
1	Namhang Substation (Busan Coast Guard Station)	Chief Lee Ju-hwi; Leader Kim Yang-seok; Inspector Cheon Sang-yong; Senior Officer Lee Mi-hyeon
2	Nohwa Substation (Wando Coast Guard Station)	Chief Kim Hyeok-tae; Leader Jeong Bok-gi; Station Team: Inspector Choi Seok-min, Senior Officer Jo Yong-gwan & Officers Kim Du-bong, Kim Min-sik; Rescue Team: Senior Officer Jeong Min-guk & Officers Lee Su-bin, Jeong Yu-seok

== List of episodes ==
Promotional poster for Season 1

=== Season 1 ===
Episode	Broadcast Date
1	August 13, 2018
2	August 20, 2018
3	August 27, 2018
4	September 3, 2018
5	September 10, 2018

=== Season 2 ===
Episode	Broadcast Date
1	November 25, 2020
2	December 2, 2020
3	December 9, 2020
4	December 16, 2020
5	December 23, 2020
6	December 30, 2020
