= Rural Police (TV series) =

Korean television program

- Promotional poster for Season 4
- Hangul: 시골경찰
- RR: Sigolgyeongchal
- MR: Sigolgyŏngch'al
- Genre: Reality show, Police
- Starring: Original series: Shin Hyun-joon (S1-4); Oh Dae-hwan (S1-4); Choi Min-yong (S1); Lee Joo-seung (S1); Lee Jung-jin (S2-3); Lee Jae-joon (S2); Lee Chung-ah (S3-4); Kang Kyung-joon (S4) Reboot series: Kim Yong-man; Kim Sung-joo; Ahn Jung-hwan; Jung Hyung-don
- Country of origin: South Korea
- Original language: Korean
- No. of seasons: 6
- No. of episodes: 62

Production
- Production location: South Korea
- Running time: 90 minutes

Original release
- Network: MBC every1
- Release: July 17, 2017 – present

Related
- Sea Police; Urban Cops

Rural Police (Korean: 시골경찰; RR: Sigolgyeongchal) is a South Korean reality show broadcast on MBC every1, where celebrities join small police centres in the countryside to experience their work as an amateur police officer. Assigned the rank of entry-level police officer (Korean: 순경; RR: sungyeong), the cast attend to emergency calls and community tasks under the mentorship of their experienced colleagues.

Four seasons of the show aired from July 2017 to December 2018, with each season filmed in a different locale in South Korea. In April 2023, the show was rebooted with the title Rural Police Returns, featuring an all-new cast. A second season of the reboot began airing in December 2023.

Two spin-offs were also produced: Sea Police, which features the Korea Coast Guard, and Urban Cops, which follows police departments based in the city.

== Cast ==
=== Original series ===
Name	Season			
Shin Hyun-joon	1	2	3	4
Oh Dae-hwan	1	2	3	4
Choi Min-yong	1			
Lee Joo-seung	1			
Lee Jung-jin		2	3	
Lee Jae-joon		2		
Lee Chung-ah			3	4
Kang Kyung-joon				4

=== Reboot series ===
- Kim Yong-man
- Kim Sung-joo
- Ahn Jung-hwan
- Jung Hyung-don
- Shin Hyun-joon (guest) (Note: Shin Hyun-joon returned in the reboot's Season 2 episodes 5 to 7, with a promotion to senior police officer (Korean: 경장; RR: gyeongjang).)

== Locations ==
The first two seasons were filmed in small "Security Centres" (Korean: 치안센터; RR: chiansenteo) serving townships (Korean: 면; RR: myeon) that encompass several villages, while the later two seasons were filmed in larger police substations (Korean: 파출소; RR: pachulso) serving relatively more populated geographical areas such as towns (Korean: 읍; RR: eup).

Season	Police Centre	Locale	Officers
1	Yongdam Security Centre	Jinan County, North Jeolla Province	Centre Chiefs Lee Wan-jae, Cha Gyu-cheol (Note: In episode 4, Lee Wan-jae steps down from the role of Centre Chief, having reached retirement age. His successor Cha Gyu-cheol appears from episode 5.); Assistant Inspector Jeon Dong-wan
2	Munsu Security Centre	Yeongju, North Gyeongsang Province	Centre Chief Kim Shin-taek; Assistant Inspector Go Dong-woo
3	Heunghae Police Substation (Note: This location was a last-minute replacement for episodes 1 to 4 as the cast were unable to board the ferry to Ulleungdo, as originally planned, due to inclement weather.)	Buk District, Pohang, North Gyeongsang Province	Station Chief Park Byeong-dae; Team Leader Gwon Sun-won; Assistant Inspectors Seo Jeong-hyeob, Lee Jeong-min
3	Ulleungdo North Police Substation (Note: This location was filmed on a second visit, appearing from episode 5 onward.)	Ulleungdo	Station Chief Kim Gi-ho; Assistant Inspectors Lee Seon-woo, Ryu Yeong-cheol
4	Sindong Police Substation	Jeongseon County, Gangwon Province	Station Chief Kim Sang-hyeon; Inspector Park Sang-ho & Police Officer Shin Dong-jin
Rural Police Returns
1	Imdong Police Substation	Andong, North Gyeongsang Province	Station Chief Lee Dong-sik; Inspector Kim Dong-hwi & Senior Police Officer Kwon Hyo-seon
1	Yeonghae Police Substation	Yeongdeok County, North Gyeongsang Province	Station Chief Son Gwang-deuk; Senior Inspector Lee Sang-hyun & Assistant Inspector Lee Hwa-mok
1	Mitan Security Centre	Pyeongchang County, Gangwon Province	Station Chief Lee Gab-ki; Senior Police Officer Park Hyung-jun & Police Officer Park Geun-min
2	Jupo Police Substation	Boryeong, South Chungcheong Province	Station Chief Oh Min-ho; Assistant Inspector Nam Seong-hyun & Police Officer Kim Dae-sung
2	Ocheon Police Substation		

== List of episodes ==
=== Season 1 ===
Episode	Broadcast Date
1	July 17, 2017
2	July 24, 2017
3	July 31, 2017
4	August 7, 2017
5	August 14, 2017
6	August 21, 2017
7	August 28, 2017
8	September 4, 2017
9	September 11, 2017
10	September 18, 2017
11	September 25, 2017
12	October 2, 2017

=== Season 2 ===
Episode	Broadcast Date
1	November 20, 2017
2	November 27, 2017
3	December 4, 2017
4	December 11, 2017
5	December 18, 2017
6	December 25, 2017
7	January 1, 2018
8	January 8, 2018
9	January 15, 2018

=== Season 3 ===
Episode	Broadcast Date
1	April 16, 2018
2	April 23, 2018
3	April 30, 2018
4	May 7, 2018
5	May 14, 2018
6	May 21, 2018
7	May 28, 2018
8	June 4, 2018
9	June 11, 2018
10	June 25, 2018

=== Season 4 ===
Episode	Broadcast Date
1	October 8, 2018
2	October 15, 2018
3	October 22, 2018
4	October 29, 2018
5	November 5, 2018
6	November 12, 2018
7	November 19, 2018
8	November 26, 2018
9	December 3, 2018
10	December 10, 2018
