= Urban Cops =

Korean television program

- Promotional poster for season 1
- Hangul: 도시경찰
- Lit.: City Police
- RR: Dosigyeongchal
- MR: Tosigyŏngch'al
- Genre: Reality show, Police
- Starring: Jang Hyuk (Season 1); Jo Jae-yoon; Kim Min-jae; Lee Tae-hwan; Chun Jung-myung (Season 2)
- Country of origin: South Korea
- Original language: Korean
- No. of seasons: 2
- No. of episodes: 20

Production
- Production location: South Korea
- Running time: 90 minutes

Original release
- Network: MBC every1
- Release: January 14 – September 30, 2019

Related
- Rural Police; Sea Police

Urban Cops (Korean: 도시경찰; RR: Dosigyeongchal) is a South Korean reality show broadcast on MBC every1, where celebrities team up with real life police to experience their work and solve crimes within the city. The show is the second spin-off of Rural Police after Sea Police, which feature the same premise but in the countryside and coastal region respectively. Like the first two series, the cast are appointed as entry-level police officers (순경; sungyeong) and work alongside a team of mentor officers.

Season 1 aired on Mondays at 20:30 (KST) from January 14 to March 18, 2019. Jo Jae-yoon from Sea Police joined the cast alongside three new faces. They were appointed entry-level police officers in the Intellectual Crime Investigation Team at Yongsan Police Station in Seoul, shadowing them on their open cases.

Season 2, Urban Cops: KCSI, aired on Mondays at 20:30 (KST) from July 29 to September 30, 2019, with the same cast returning except Jang Hyuk, who was replaced by Chun Jung-myung. In this season, the cast joined the Korean Crime Scene Investigation's (KCSI) Forensic Investigation Unit at Seoul Metropolitan Police Agency.

Promotional poster for season 2, Urban Cops: KCSI

Following the popularity of Seasons 1 and 2, the production crew stated in September 2019 that they were discussing the possibility of Season 3.

== Cast ==
=== Main cast ===
Name	Season 1	Season 2
Jang Hyuk	Episodes 1-10	
Jo Jae-yoon	Episodes 1-10	Episodes 1-10
Lee Tae-hwan	Episodes 1-10	Episodes 1-10
Kim Min-jae	Episodes 4-10	Episodes 1-10
Chun Jung-myung		Episodes 1-10

=== Police officers ===
Season 1 — Intellectual Crime Investigation Team (Yongsan Police Station, Seoul)

- Leader: Lee Dae-woo
- Investigators: Lee Yoo-shin, Lee Woo-ho, Jo Kyeong-jun, Yoo Seung-ryeol and Choi Woo-cheol

Season 2 — Forensic Investigation Unit (KCSI, Seoul Metropolitan Police Agency)

- Chief: Lee Sang-bae
- Captain: Kim Jeong-yong
- Team 1: Park Seong-woo (Leader), Jo Yeong-hun
- Team 2: Choi Pyeong-yeop (Leader), Jang Dae-yeong
- Team 3: Na Je-seong (Leader), Hwang Seong-yeong

== List of episodes ==
=== Season 1 ===
Episode	Title	Airdate
1	Our First Time Being Detectives	January 14, 2019
2	You Are Surrounded	January 21, 2019
3	Let's Go Till the End	January 28, 2019
4	The Time of Dogs and Wolves	February 4, 2019
5	A Better Tomorrow	February 11, 2019
6	An Unfair Bargain	February 18, 2019
7	Hide and Seek	February 25, 2019
8	An Ordinary Person	March 4, 2019
9	Veteran	March 11, 2019
10	Extreme Job	March 18, 2019

=== Season 2 ===
Synopsis of episodes in Urban Cops: KCSI

No.	Title	Original release date
1	"The Beginning"	July 29, 2019
Chun Jung-myung, Jo Jae-yoon, Kim Min-jae and Lee Tae-hwan start their first day with the Forensic Investigation Unit (FIU) at Seoul Metropolitan Police Agency (SMPA) by meeting their mentors, who brief them on the FIU's tasks. After lunch, they inspect the forensic investigation vehicles. Jung-myung and Min-jae are sent with Team 3 to investigate the theft of cash from an apartment, which turns out to be a mistaken report. While packing up, they're dispatched again to a voice phishing victim's report. Meanwhile, Jae-yoon, Tae-hwan and Team 2 arrive on the scene of a roadside death.
2	"The World They Live In" (Korean: 그들이 사는 세상)	August 5, 2019
Nervous about their first case, Jae-yoon and Tae-hwan do their best to help Team 2 look for potential signs of murder. Eventual autopsy results indicate death from natural causes. Meanwhile, Team 3 is at a public locker where voice phishing criminals retrieved their victim's money just hours prior. Min-jae successfully collects DNA, while Jung-myung painstakingly looks for fingerprints. Later during night duty, Tae-hwan is dispatched with Team 2 to a truck theft minutes before the end of shift. He tries out photographing the scene and dusting for fingerprints for the first time. The next morning, the four arrive over an hour later than their mentors and scramble to prepare for the morning presentation to Unit Chief Lee.
3	"A Cool Mind, A Warm Heart" (Korean: 머리는 차갑게, 가슴은 뜨겁게)	August 12, 2019
Jung-myung submits a half-complete report that's heavily corrected by Unit Chief Lee, unlike Jae-yoon's report which passes. After a peaceful lunch, Tae-hwan and Min-jae follow Team 1 to the SMPA Forensic Analysis Team and the National Forensic Service to request inspection of the previous day's evidence. Meanwhile, Jung-myung and Jae-yoon are dispatched with Team 3 to a pub theft involving alcohol worth $10,000, followed by a worksite accident involving a fatal fall. While inspecting the body at the hospital, Jae-yoon becomes deeply affected. After returning to the office, Team 3 process the wine bottles from the pub theft, while Team 1 return much later at night from an undisclosed case.
4	"Locard's Principle" (Korean: 로카르의 법칙)	August 19, 2019
In the daily morning briefing, Jae-yoon is embarrassed when his report turns out to be full of errors. He is then dispatched with Min-jae to a cash register theft at a restaurant, while Jung-myung works on a case report at the office with Tae-hwan's help. Right as the field team return, a missing person case alert sends them back out again. Jae-yoon and Min-jae struggle with working in protective gear in the summer heat as their scan of the apartment turns up nothing unusual. The work day ends just past 9pm for everyone except Jung-myung, who spends night duty uneventfully working on reports.
5	"Even If the World Deceives You" (Korean: 세상이 그대를 속일지라도)	August 26, 2019
Tae-hwan begins the next day practicing fingerprint analysis through AFIS. The office soon turns tense at news of a discovery of human organs, but it turns out to be a false alarm. Tae-hwan and Min-jae then work on obtaining clearer fingerprints off wine bottles from an earlier case. A phone call about a building collapse in Jamwon-dong, Seoul leads to the first activation of the forensic investigation bus, which Jung-myung and Jae-yoon board. Amidst the rescue operation, they assist with photographing the scene for the accident inquiry, but eventually return to the office while their mentors continue late into the night. The next morning begins cheerfully with practice on lifting footprints, which is interrupted by a preparatory arson alert. Tae-hwan and Jae-yoon move out with the Fire Investigation Team to investigate an apartment sprayed down with petrol, where Tae-hwan struggles with the pungent gas fumes.
6	"Don't You Worry" (Korean: 걱정 말아요 그대)	September 2, 2019
During practical training, Jung-myung and Min-jae are dispatched to a car burglary, where they collect fingerprints and DNA evidence. Meanwhile, Tae-hwan gets to leave work on time, while Jae-yoon spends night duty writing reports. A new day opens with a foreboding downpour, which leads to the disruption of a relaxing teatime by a full personnel activation to a flooded rainwater pump facility, with 1 dead and 2 missing. While rescuers race against time, the team collect evidence for the accident inquiry. Tae-hwan and Min-jae work to identify the body, but struggle with the fingerprints for hours in the forensic bus. With Jung-myung and Jae-yoon also dispatched to another case of unnatural death, everyone ends the day with heavy troubled hearts.
7	"An Unfinished Story" (Korean: 아직 못다 한 이야기)	September 9, 2019
The next morning, Min-jae requests for time off, still troubled by the flooding accident death. Jae-yoon and Tae-hwan are also affected by a case where a man set himself on fire. Later, Unit Chief Lee checks in on them, concerned about the impact of the recent extreme cases they've done. At the office, Jung-myung makes his own sanitiser spray in the laboratory, while Tae-hwan proves his mettle as the "fingerprint king." After a weekend's rest, the four report for duty again on the hottest day of the summer. Min-jae learns how to do a digitally-aged composite sketch for a request by the Long-Term Missing Persons Team. Meanwhile, Tae-hwan and Jae-yoon try out CCTV footage analysis. Lunch plans are disrupted for the duo by a store theft, where they struggle with working in a heatwave.
8	"I Thought There Was Only Darkness in the Night" (Korean: 밤에는 어둠만 있는 줄 알았다)	September 16, 2019
Right as the store theft team return, two alerts come in, minutes apart. Jung-myung, Min-jae and Team 2 respond to an attempted break-in, meticulously collecting evidence. Meanwhile, Jae-yoon and Tae-hwan prepare to move out to an unnatural death at Suraksan, but soon stand down when the victim is resuscitated. Minutes before the day shift ends, they're dispatched to an unnatural death, where the body has decomposed beyond recognition in a crammed one-room apartment. The duo struggle with both the stench and the sad reality of the victim dying alone. At 3am in the office, a false alarm of murder nearly causes full personnel activation. Reporting early the next day, the four enjoy a hearty breakfast but are soon alerted to yet another unnatural death.
9	"When Life Speaks to Me" (Korean: 삶이 내게 말을 걸어올 때)	September 23, 2019
Jung-myung, Jae-yoon and Team 3 are at Hangang, investigating a body recovered from the river. Despite the stench, Jae-yoon volunteers to enter the scene. An autopsy is conducted in a police tent and fingerprints collected at the hospital. Tae-hwan and investigator Jang swiftly process the prints at the office, identifying the deceased. In the afternoon, Jae-yoon inadvertently gets swept up in Jang's endless scientific talk at the office while the others are dispatched individually with only one mentor each for the first time. Tae-hwan and Jang's case wraps up quickly as they discover on arrival that the offender has been arrested, while Jung-myung proves his thoroughness at the scene of a restaurant break-in with Team Leader Na. Night duty for Jung-myung proves uneventful until the final 15 minutes, when an unnatural death alert sounds.
10	"And? End"	September 30, 2019
Having left work on time, Jae-yoon, Min-jae and Tae-hwan enjoy a barbecue feast. Meanwhile, Jung-myung gets to end night duty promptly when the cause of death is discovered as chronic illness. On their last day of work, the four arrive early and have a smooth morning briefing. Jung-myung tests his memory against Team Leader Choi, and later visits SMPA with investigator Jo for a fingerprint analysis request. Min-jae also wraps up the composite sketch he worked on through the week. To pass a quiet afternoon, Jae-yoon suggests playing the ladder game with ice cream for the department and filming crew on the line, which investigator Jo unknowingly loses alongside Min-jae. The team share last words with each other at their final meeting, before the formal farewell ceremony.

== Ratings ==
- Ratings listed below are the individual corner ratings of Urban Cops. (Note: Individual corner ratings do not include commercial time, which regular ratings include.)
- In the ratings below, the highest rating for the show will be in red and the lowest rating for the show will be in blue each season.

=== Season 1 ===
Ep. #	Original Airdate	AGB Nielsen Ratings Nationwide
1	January 14, 2019	1.698%
2	January 21, 2019	1.310%
3	January 28, 2019	1.765%
4	February 4, 2019	1.270%
5	February 11, 2019	1.343%
6	February 18, 2019	1.493%
7	February 25, 2019	1.447%
8	March 4, 2019	1.406%
9	March 11, 2019	1.283%
10	March 18, 2019	1.095%

=== Season 2 ===
Ep. #	Original Airdate	AGB Nielsen Ratings Nationwide
1	July 29, 2019	0.6%
2	August 5, 2019	0.5%
3	August 12, 2019	0.5%
4	August 19, 2019	0.5%
5	August 26, 2019	0.4%
6	September 2, 2019	0.5%
7	September 9, 2019	0.4%
8	September 16, 2019	0.584%
9	September 24, 2019	0.4%
10	September 30, 2019	0.4%
