= Homemade Love Story =

2020-21 South Korean television series

- Promotional poster
- Hangul: 오! 삼광빌라!
- Lit.: Oh! Samgwang Villa!
- RR: O! Samgwangbilla!
- MR: O! Samgwangbilla!
- Genre: Drama; Melodrama
- Created by: KBS Drama Production
- Written by: Yoon Kyung-ah
- Directed by: Hong Seok-ku
- Starring: Jin Ki-joo; Lee Jang-woo
- Composer: Choi Cheolho
- Country of origin: South Korea
- Original language: Korean
- No. of episodes: 100 (Note: Wanting to circumvent Korean laws that prevent commercial breaks in the middle of an episode, what would previously have been aired as single 70-minute episodes are now being repackaged as two 35-minute episodes, with two episodes being shown each night with a commercial break between the two.)

Production
- Executive producer: Yoon Jae-hyuk
- Camera setup: Single-camera
- Running time: 35 minutes
- Production companies: Monster Union; Production H

Original release
- Network: KBS2
- Release: September 19, 2020 – March 7, 2021

Homemade Love Story (Korean: 오! 삼광빌라!) is a South Korean family drama television series starring Jin Ki-joo and Lee Jang-woo. The drama aired on KBS2 from September 19, 2020 to March 7, 2021, every Saturday and Sunday from 19:55 to 21:15 (KST).

== Synopsis ==
Woo Jae-hee, an architect whose father manages a big company, has not been on good terms with him over the years. After entering a university, Jae-hee lived independently and did not receive support from his father. Now a professional architect, he meets interior designer Lee Bitchaewoon for the first time while visiting a house remodelling site. The duo, who live together as residents of Samgwang Villa, get into an argument at the house remodelling site due to different views.

== Cast ==
=== Starring ===
- Jin Ki-joo as Lee Bit Chae-woon
  - Park Seo-kyung as Young Bit Chae-woon

Lee Bitchaewoon is an interior designer who aims to visit customers by helping them select curtains, lighting, as well as other design choices. She supports her family, including her mother, Soon-jung, and two younger siblings. Lee Bitchaewoon feels burdened by having to always support them. She dreams of becoming a textile designer someday, which is impossible for her, as well as living in Samgwang Villa and the responsibility of being the head of the household.

- Lee Jang-woo as Woo Jae-hee

=== Recurring ===
==== Lee family ====
- Jeon In-hwa as Lee Soon-jung
- Bona as Lee Hae-deun
- Ryeoun as Lee Ra-hoon

==== Woo family ====
- Jeong Bo-seok as Woo Jung-hoo
- Jin Kyung as Jung Min-jae

==== Kim family ====
- Hwang Shin-hye as Kim Jung-won
- Han Bo-reum as Jang Seo-ah
- Dong Ha as Jang Joon-ah

==== Tenants of Samkwang Villa ====
- Kim Sun-young as Lee Man-jung
- In Gyo-jin as Kim Hwak-se
- Jeon Sung-woo as Hwang Na-ro
- Kim Si-eun as Cha Ba-reun

=== Others ===
- Moon Ji-hoo as Lee Jung-woo
- Um Hyo-sup as Park Pil-hong
- Jung Jae-soon as Lee Choon-seok
- Lee Seung-hyung as Jung Min-seok
- Lee Dong-toung as Yoo-hyeon
- Shim Young-eun
- Park Jeong-eon
- Park Jeong-won
- Park Jung-min
- Park So-yoon
- Kang Eun-ah
- Jeon Eun-mi

=== Special appearances ===
- DIA
- Shin Seung-ho
- Im Ye-jin

== Viewership ==
Homemade Love Story : South Korea viewers per episode (millions)

Episodes	Episode number																			
Episodes	1	2	3	4	5	6	7	8	9	10	11	12	13	14	15	16	17	18	19	20
Ep.1-20	3.286	3.935	3.899	4.305	3.317	3.844	4.026	4.504	3.301	3.984	4.026	4.635	3.797	4.413	4.239	4.756	3.599	4.339	4.212	4.841
Ep.21-40	3.608	4.328	4.056	4.651	3.822	4.569	4.527	5.033	3.699	4.451	4.592	5.089	3.711	4.485	4.628	5.038	4.038	4.780	4.968	5.564
Ep.41-60	4.141	4.940	5.016	5.368	4.377	5.163	5.203	5.557	4.257	5.280	5.204	5.704	4.074	5.186	5.140	5.616	4.190	5.141	5.063	5.529
Ep.61-80	4.831	5.608	5.378	5.895	4.316	5.354	5.074	5.718	3.938	5.165	5.029	5.747	4.049	5.152	5.105	5.642	4.347	5.411	5.436	6.145
Ep.81-100	4.228	5.306	5.483	5.724	4.387	5.002	5.475	5.838	4.282	5.259	5.289	5.673	3.794	4.619	4.907	5.350	4.478	5.484	5.446	5.676

Source: Audience measurement performed nationwide by Nielsen Korea.

Average TV viewership ratings
Ep.	Original broadcast date	Average audience share		
Ep.	Original broadcast date	Nielsen Korea		TNmS
Ep.	Original broadcast date	Nationwide	Seoul	Nationwide
1	September 19, 2020	19.9% (2nd)	19.0% (2nd)	18.7%
2	September 19, 2020	23.3% (1st)	22.7% (1st)	21.7%
3	September 20, 2020	22.2% (2nd)	21.7% (2nd)	20.7%
4	September 20, 2020	24.6% (1st)	24.1% (1st)	22.7%
5	September 26, 2020	19.7% (2nd)	19.7% (2nd)	17.1%
6	September 26, 2020	23.0% (1st)	22.9% (1st)	20.2%
7	September 27, 2020	23.9% (2nd)	23.3% (2nd)	21.2%
8	September 27, 2020	26.4% (1st)	25.4% (1st)	23.5%
9	October 3, 2020	19.2% (2nd)	18.4% (3rd)	17.5%
10	October 3, 2020	22.8% (1st)	21.9% (1st)	20.4%
11	October 4, 2020	22.9% (2nd)	21.3% (2nd)	20.6%
12	October 4, 2020	26.5% (1st)	25.9% (1st)	23.6%
13	October 10, 2020	21.5% (2nd)	21.0% (2nd)	17.4%
14	October 10, 2020	25.2% (1st)	24.6% (1st)	20.4%
15	October 11, 2020	25.1% (2nd)	23.7% (2nd)	20.4%
16	October 11, 2020	28.5% (1st)	26.9% (1st)	23.5%
17	October 17, 2020	20.7% (2nd)	20.1% (2nd)	17.6%
18	October 17, 2020	25.2% (1st)	24.3% (1st)	20.4%
19	October 18, 2020	24.5% (2nd)	23.3% (2nd)	21.4%
20	October 18, 2020	27.6% (1st)	26.3% (1st)	23.9%
21	October 24, 2020	21.2% (2nd)	20.8% (2nd)	17.4%
22	October 24, 2020	25.1% (1st)	24.8% (1st)	21.1%
23	October 25, 2020	23.9% (2nd)	22.8% (2nd)	20.9%
24	October 25, 2020	27.4% (1st)	26.3% (1st)	23.9%
25	October 31, 2020	22.5% (2nd)	21.0% (2nd)	18.4%
26	October 31, 2020	26.7% (1st)	24.8% (1st)	21.1%
27	November 1, 2020	26.2% (2nd)	25.1% (2nd)	22.7%
28	November 1, 2020	28.9% (1st)	28.1% (1st)	24.7%
29	November 7, 2020	22.3% (2nd)	21.9% (2nd)	18.9%
30	November 7, 2020	26.4% (1st)	25.3% (1st)	22.4%
31	November 8, 2020	26.4% (2nd)	24.5% (2nd)	21.1%
32	November 8, 2020	29.3% (1st)	27.6% (1st)	23.1%
33	November 14, 2020	22.9% (2nd)	21.7% (2nd)	18.8%
34	November 14, 2020	27.3% (1st)	25.9% (1st)	22.5%
35	November 15, 2020	27.7% (2nd)	26.6% (2nd)	23.4%
36	November 15, 2020	29.6% (1st)	28.4% (1st)	25.1%
37	November 21, 2020	25.3% (2nd)	24.3% (2nd)	21.6%
38	November 21, 2020	29.5% (1st)	28.7% (1st)	25.0%
39	November 22, 2020	28.7% (2nd)	27.3% (2nd)	24.9%
40	November 22, 2020	31.9% (1st)	30.5% (1st)	27.3%
41	November 28, 2020	25.5% (2nd)	24.6% (2nd)	21.1%
42	November 28, 2020	29.4% (1st)	28.3% (1st)	24.7%
43	November 29, 2020	29.4% (2nd)	27.7% (2nd)	24.5%
44	November 29, 2020	31.8% (1st)	30.1% (1st)	27.0%
45	December 5, 2020	25.5% (2nd)	24.7% (2nd)	21.3%
46	December 5, 2020	29.4% (1st)	28.3% (1st)	24.9%
47	December 6, 2020	29.7% (2nd)	28.2% (2nd)	24.1%
48	December 6, 2020	31.6% (1st)	30.4% (1st)	25.5%
49	December 12, 2020	25.6% (2nd)	25.1% (2nd)	21.5%
50	December 12, 2020	30.8% (1st)	30.0% (1st)	25.2%
51	December 13, 2020	30.3% (2nd)	28.9% (2nd)	25.1%
52	December 13, 2020	32.9% (1st)	31.7% (1st)	26.7%
53	December 19, 2020	24.1% (2nd)	22.8% (2nd)	19.4%
54	December 19, 2020	30.3% (1st)	29.4% (1st)	22.8%
55	December 20, 2020	29.8% (2nd)	27.9% (2nd)	24.7%
56	December 20, 2020	32.6% (1st)	30.6% (1st)	26.7%
57	December 26, 2020	25.4% (2nd)	24.1% (2nd)	21.4%
58	December 26, 2020	30.8% (1st)	29.5% (1st)	24.9%
59	December 27, 2020	31.2% (2nd)	29.9% (2nd)	25.3%
60	December 27, 2020	33.2% (1st)	32.2% (1st)	26.7%
61	January 2, 2021	27.7% (2nd)	26.5% (2nd)	24.1%
62	January 2, 2021	31.8% (1st)	30.5% (1st)	27.1%
63	January 3, 2021	30.7% (2nd)	29.4% (2nd)	23.6%
64	January 3, 2021	33.3% (1st)	32.3% (1st)	25.5%
65	January 9, 2021	25.1% (2nd)	24.0% (2nd)	22.5%
66	January 9, 2021	30.9% (1st)	29.4% (1st)	27.7%
67	January 10, 2021	29.9% (2nd)	28.2% (2nd)	24.7%
68	January 10, 2021	33.6% (1st)	32.3% (1st)	27.8%
69	January 16, 2021	23.2% (2nd)	21.8% (2nd)	21.3%
70	January 16, 2021	29.7% (1st)	28.1% (1st)	26.3%
71	January 17, 2021	29.8% (2nd)	28.9% (2nd)	26.0%
72	January 17, 2021	33.1% (1st)	32.3% (1st)	29.0%
73	January 23, 2021	24.7% (2nd)	23.6% (2nd)	21.1%
74	January 23, 2021	30.7% (1st)	29.2% (1st)	25.6%
75	January 24, 2021	29.9% (2nd)	28.7% (2nd)	25.4%
76	January 24, 2021	32.5% (1st)	30.8% (1st)	27.8%
77	January 30, 2021	26.3% (2nd)	25.1% (2nd)	21.9%
78	January 30, 2021	31.8% (1st)	30.3% (1st)	27.0%
79	January 31, 2021	30.3% (2nd)	28.1% (2nd)	26.7%
80	January 31, 2021	33.7% (1st)	31.9% (1st)	29.2%
81	February 6, 2021	25.1% (2nd)	23.3% (2nd)	—N/a
82	February 6, 2021	30.7% (1st)	29.2% (1st)	—N/a
83	February 7, 2021	31.4% (2nd)	29.9% (2nd)	27.2%
84	February 7, 2021	32.8% (1st)	31.4% (1st)	28.6%
85	February 13, 2021	26.3% (2nd)	25.3% (2nd)	25.1%
86	February 13, 2021	29.7% (1st)	28.4% (1st)	26.7%
87	February 14, 2021	31.0% (2nd)	29.0% (2nd)	27.0%
88	February 14, 2021	32.8% (1st)	30.9% (1st)	28.5%
89	February 20, 2021	26.0% (2nd)	25.1% (2nd)	22.0% (2nd)
90	February 20, 2021	31.0% (1st)	29.9% (1st)	26.6% (1st)
91	February 21, 2021	30.2% (2nd)	28.2% (2nd)	25.4% (2nd)
92	February 21, 2021	32.4% (1st)	30.5% (1st)	27.3% (1st)
93	February 27, 2021	23.8% (3rd)	23.7% (3rd)	21.3% (3rd)
94	February 27, 2021	28.5% (1st)	27.9% (1st)	24.4% (1st)
95	February 28, 2021	29.0% (2nd)	27.8% (2nd)	24.1% (2nd)
96	February 28, 2021	31.2% (1st)	29.6% (1st)	26.3% (1st)
97	March 6, 2021	26.9% (2nd)	26.4% (3rd)	22.5% (3rd)
98	March 6, 2021	31.6% (1st)	30.5% (1st)	27.3% (1st)
99	March 7, 2021	31.2% (2nd)	30.1% (2nd)	26.5% (2nd)
100	March 7, 2021	32.9% (1st)	32.1% (1st)	29.4% (1st)
Average		%	%	%
The blue numbers represent the lowest ratings and the red numbers represent the highest ratings.

== Original soundtrack ==
Homemade Love Story

Soundtrack album by Various
- Released: 2020-21
- Genre: Soundtrack
- Languages: Korean; English
- Label: Danal Entertainment

=== Part 1 ===
Released on September 26, 2020
No.	Title	Lyrics	Music	Artist	Length
1.	"Love can't be stopped like the years"	Major Leaguer	Major Leaguer	Jin Min-ho	4:15
2.	"Love can't be stopped like the years" (Inst.)		Major Leaguer		4:15
Total length:					8:30

== Awards and nominations ==
Year	Award	Category	Nominee	Result	Ref.
2020	KBS Drama Awards	Top Excellence Award, Actor	Jeong Bo-seok	Won	
2020	KBS Drama Awards	Excellence Award, Actor in a Mid-length Drama	Lee Jang-woo	Won	
2020	KBS Drama Awards	Excellence Award, Actress in a Mid-length Drama	Jin Ki-joo	Won	
2020	KBS Drama Awards	Best New Actress	Bona	Won	
2020	KBS Drama Awards	Best Supporting Actress	Kim Sun-young	Won	
2020	KBS Drama Awards	Best Couple Award	Lee Jang-woo, Jin Ki-joo, and Jeong Bo-seok	Won	
2020	KBS Drama Awards	Top Excellence Award, Actress	Jeon In-hwa	Nominated	
2020	KBS Drama Awards	Excellence Award, Actress in a Mid-length Drama	Jeon In-hwa, Hwang Shin-hye	Nominated	
2020	KBS Drama Awards	Excellence Award, Actor in a Mid-length Drama	Jeong Bo-seok	Nominated	
2020	KBS Drama Awards	Best New Actor	Ryeo Woon	Nominated	
2020	KBS Drama Awards	Best Supporting Actor	In Gyo-jin	Nominated	
2020	7th APAN Star Awards	Best Supporting Actor	In Gyo-jin	Nominated	
2020	7th APAN Star Awards	Top Excellence Award, Actress in Serial Drama	Lee Jang-woo	Nominated	
2020	7th APAN Star Awards	Excellence Award, Actress in Serial Drama	Jin Ki-joo	Nominated	
