= Jin Ki-joo =

South Korean actress (born 1989)

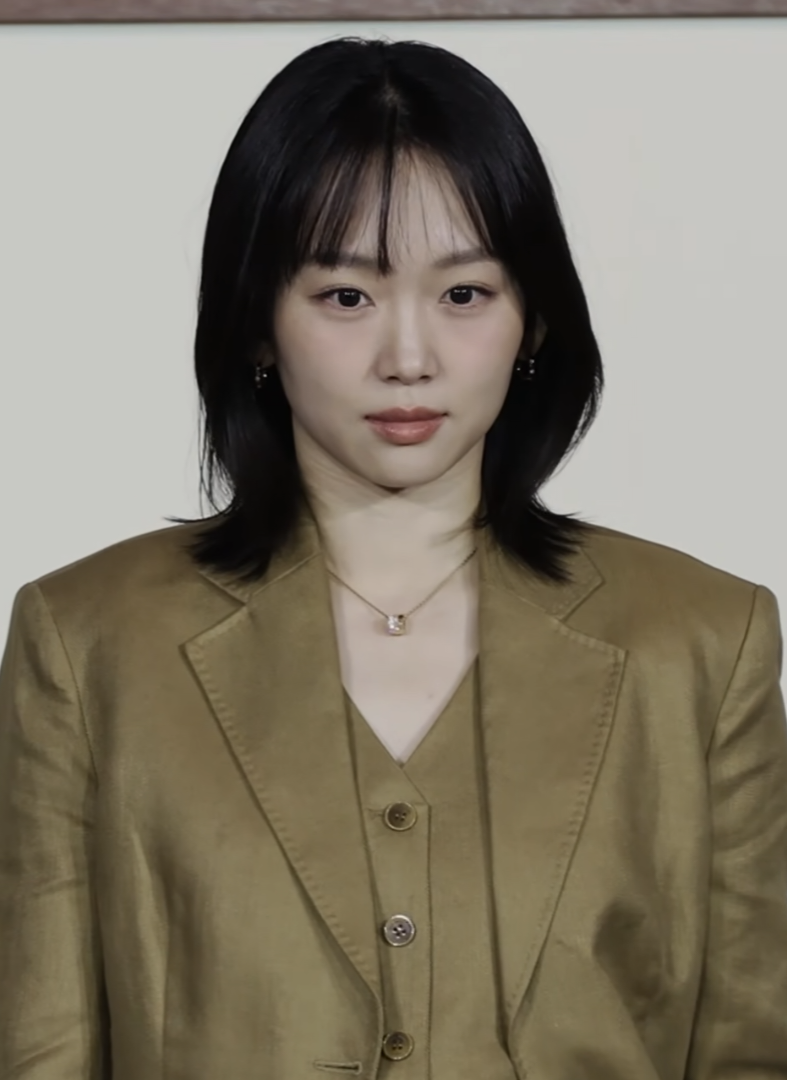
- Jin in June 2026
- Born: January 26, 1989 (age 37); Seoul, South Korea
- Education: Chung-Ang University
- Occupation: Actress
- Years active: 2014–present
- Agent: Basecamp Company

Korean name
- Hangul: 진기주
- RR: Jin Giju
- MR: Chin Kiju

Jin Ki-joo (Korean: 진기주; born January 26, 1989) is a South Korean actress. She made a breakthrough in 2018, landing her first lead role in a television series with Come and Hug Me after she acted in that year's acclaimed series Misty and film Little Forest.

== Career ==
Jin Ki-joo graduated from the Department of Computer Engineering at Chung-Ang University and later worked at Samsung SDS for three years, before working as journalist for Seoul Broadcasting System regional affiliate Gangwon No.1 Broadcasting, before starting her acting career. After Jin won a prize in the 23rd Supermodel Contest, the organizer introduced her to some management companies for actors. Her acting debut was in tvN's 2015 romantic comedy television series Second 20s.

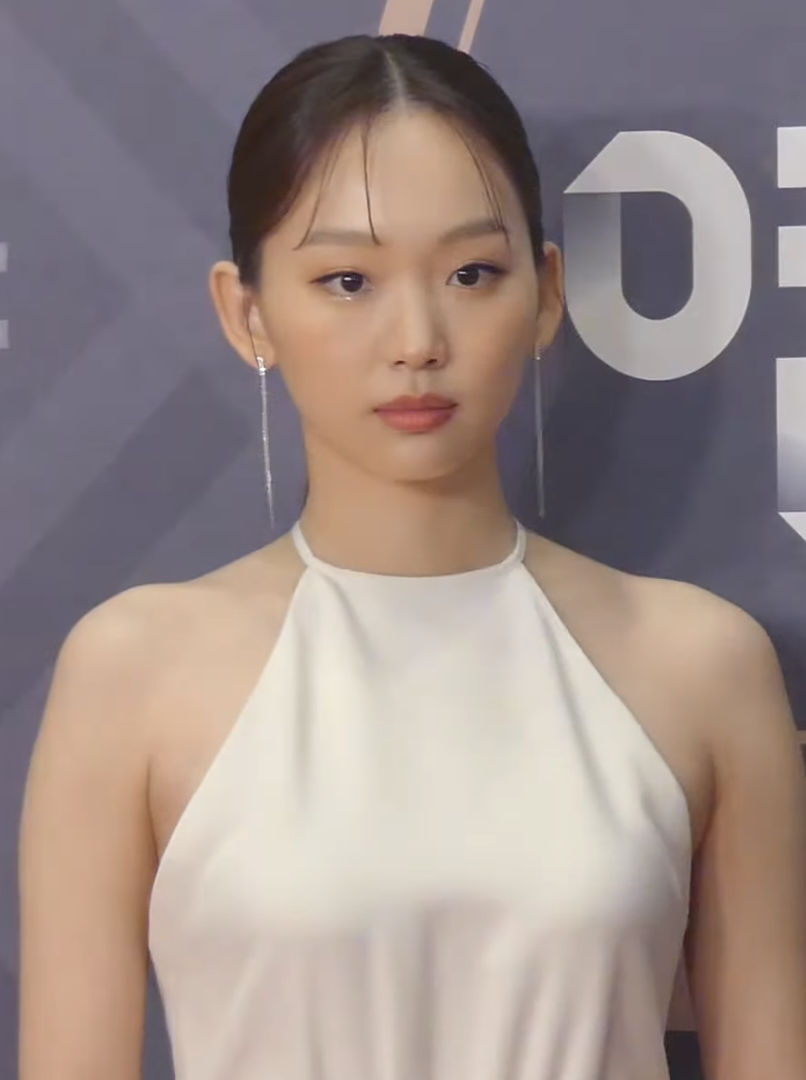
Jin at the 2018 MBC Drama Awards

In 2018, Jin's breakthrough year. She got nominated and won several major film awards with her role as a snarky and playful country girl who yearns for the big city in Little Forest. Her standout role as the protagonist's rival in JTBC's melodrama mystery Misty paved the way for Jin to be cast in a leading role for the first time in MBC's melodrama thriller Come and Hug Me.

In 2019, Jin starred in the SBS romantic comedy series The Secret Life of My Secretary.

Jin played the protagonist role in KBS2's 2020 family weekend drama Homemade Love Story.

In 2022, Jin accepted two series offers, MBC's supernatural fantasy From Now On, Showtime! and KBS2's time travel mystery My Perfect Stranger.

She acted as a journalist and daughter of assassinated presidential candidate in the 2024 period series Uncle Samsik starring acclaimed film actor Song Kang-ho.

Jin was cast in MBC's action comedy Undercover High School aired in early 2025.

In April 2025, Jin signed a new management contract with Basecamp Company, the agency founded by veteran actors Cha Tae-hyun and Zo In-sung a month ago. She became that agency's first actress.

== Filmography ==
Key
†	Denotes films that have not yet been released

=== Films ===
Year	Title	Role	Notes	Ref.
2018	Little Forest	Joo Eun-sook		
2018	Unknown Woman	Hae-kyung	Short film	
2021	Midnight	Kim Kyung-mi	TVING release	
2024	Land of Happiness	Jo Soon-jung		

=== Television series ===
Year	Title	Role	Notes	Ref.
2015	Second 20s	Park Seung-hyun		
2015	Splash Splash Love	Queen Soheon	2 Episodes	
2016	One More Happy Ending	An Soon-soo		
2016	The Good Wife	Song Hee-soo		
2016	Moon Lovers: Scarlet Heart Ryeo	Chae-ryung		
2017	Wednesday 3:30 PM	Sun Eun-woo		
2018	Misty	Han Ji-won		
2018	Come and Hug Me	Han Jae-yi / Gil Nak-won		
2019	The Secret Life of My Secretary	Jung Gal-hee		
2020–2021	Homemade Love Story	Lee Bit Chae Woon		
2022	From Now On, Showtime!	Go Seul-hae		
2022	Shooting Stars	Kim Jin-kyung	Cameo (episode 11)	
2023	My Perfect Stranger	Baek Yoon-young		
2024	Uncle Samsik	Joo Yeo-jin		
2025	Undercover High School	Oh Su-a / Oh Bong-ja		
2026	Teach You a Lesson	Im Han-rim		

=== Television shows ===
Year	Title	Role	Notes	Ref.
2014	Supermodel Contest	Contestant		
2015	Model House Room of Ten			
2018	Young Farmer (청년 농부)	Narrator	Documentary	

=== Music video appearances ===
Year	Song title	Artist	Ref.
2021	"It's Snowing"	Lee Mu-jin (ft.Heize)	

== Discography ==
=== Soundtrack appearances ===
Title	Year	Album
"Spring" (여기 봄)	2017	Wednesday 3.30 pm OST

== Awards and nominations ==
Name of the award ceremony, year presented, category, nominee of the award, and the result of the nomination
Award ceremony	Year	Category	Nominee / Work	Result	Ref.
APAN Star Awards	2018	Best New Actress	Misty	Nominated	
APAN Star Awards	2021	Excellence Award, Actress in Serial Drama	Homemade Love Story	Nominated	
Baeksang Arts Awards	2018	Best New Actress – Film	Little Forest	Nominated	
Buil Film Awards	2018	Best New Actress	Little Forest	Nominated	
Chunsa Film Art Awards	2019	Best New Actress	Little Forest	Won	
Grand Bell Awards	2018	Best New Actress	Little Forest	Nominated	
KBS Drama Awards	2020	Excellence Award, Actress in a Mid-length Drama	Homemade Love Story	Won	
KBS Drama Awards	2020	Best Couple Award	Jin Ki-joo (with Lee Jang-woo and Jeong Bo-seok); Homemade Love Story	Won	
MBC Drama Awards	2018	Excellence Award, Actor in a Wednesday-Thursday Miniseries	Come and Hug Me	Nominated	
MBC Drama Awards	2018	Best Couple Award	Jin Ki-joo (with Jang Ki-yong); Come and Hug Me	Won	
MBC Drama Awards	2022	Top Excellence Award, Actress in a Miniseries	From Now On, Showtime!	Nominated	
MBC Drama Awards	2022	Best Couple Award	Jin Ki-joo (with Park Hae-jin); From Now On, Showtime!	Nominated	
MBC Drama Awards	2025	Top Excellence Award, Actress in a Miniseries	Undercover High School	Won	
SBS Drama Awards	2019	Excellence Award, Actress in a Miniseries	The Secret Life of My Secretary	Nominated	
Supermodel Contest	2014	Olivia Lauren Prize	Jin Ki-joo	Won	
The Seoul Awards	2018	Best New Actress	Little Forest	Nominated	
