= Cha Mi-kyung =

South Korean actress (born 1965)

- Born: 25 July 1965 (age 61)
- Other name: Kim Mi-kyung
- Occupations: Actress; theater actor
- Years active: 2007–present
- Agent: Different Company

Korean name
- Hangul: 차미경
- RR: Cha Migyeong
- MR: Ch'a Migyŏng

Cha Mi-kyung (Korean: 차미경; born 25 July 1965) is a South Korean actress. She made her acting debut in 2007, since then, she has appeared in number of films and television series. She is known for her roles in Itaewon Class (2020), Racket Boys and The Red Sleeve (2021). She has acted in films as: Kim Ji-young, Born 1982 (2019) and Three Sisters (2020) among others. In 2021 she appeared in TV series Our Beloved Summer and in 2022 she is cast in TV series From Now On, Showtime! alongside Park Hae-jin.

== Career ==
Cha Mi-kyung is affiliated to artist management company Different Company. She is also a founding member of the Gamagol Theater Company.

In 2021, she appeared as Oh Mae grandma in SBS sports TV series Racket Boys, for which she was nominated for Best Supporting Actress Award for an Actress at 2021 SBS Drama Awards.

== Filmography ==
=== Films ===
Year	Title	Role	Notes	Ref.
2007	Secret Sunshine	Boutique owner		
2010	The Boy from Ipanema	Owner of B&B		
2011	My Heart Beats	Professor Yeo		
2012	The Neighbor	Sang-yeong's wife		
2013	Hope	Vice-principal		
2014	Thuy	Mother-in-law		
2015	Alice: Boy from Wonderland	Female professor		
2017	Ordinary People	Mother-in-law		
2018	Golden Slumber	Supermarket Owner		
2018	A Field Day	Jin-Ho's mother		
2018	Dark Figure of Crime	Kalguksu		
2019	Juror 8	Yang Choon-ok		
2019	Kim Ji-young: Born 1982	Dae-hyun's mother		
2019	Family Affair	Mom Kyeong-sook		
2020	Three Sisters	Mother		
2021	The Moon In The Daytime	Lee Seul-i	Short film	
2022	A Letter from Kyoto	Hwa-ja		
2023	Our Season	Chun-bun		
2024	Hidden Face	Seong-jin's mother		
2026	Still Shining	Jung-im	Releasing at BIFF	

=== Television series ===
Year	Title	Role	Notes	Ref.
2020	Itaewon Class	Kim Soon-rye		
2020	The Cursed	Jin Jong-hyeon's mother		
2020	Memorist	Mrs. Gong		
2020	Mothers	Choi Soon-ok		
2020	Mystic Pop-up Bar	Jeom-rye	Ep.4 Special appearance	
2021	Racket Boys	Oh Mae grandma		
2021	The Red Sleeve	Court Lady Park		
2021–2022	Our Beloved Summer	Kang Ja-kyung		
2022	From Now On, Showtime!	Na Geum-ok		
2022	The Forbidden Marriage	Grand Queen Dowager		

== Awards and nominations ==
Name of the award ceremony, year presented, category, nominee of the award, and the result of the nomination
Award ceremony	Year	Category	Nominee / Work	Result	Ref.
SBS Drama Awards	2021	Best Supporting Actress in a Mini-Series Genre/Fantasy Drama	Racket Boys	Nominated	
SBS Drama Awards	2021	Best Supporting Team (Note: with Kim Min-ki, Lee Ji-won, Jung Min-seong, Kim Kang-hoon, Cha Mi-kyung and Shin Cheol-jin)	Racket Boys	Won	
