= Kim Kang-hoon =

South Korean actor (born 2010)

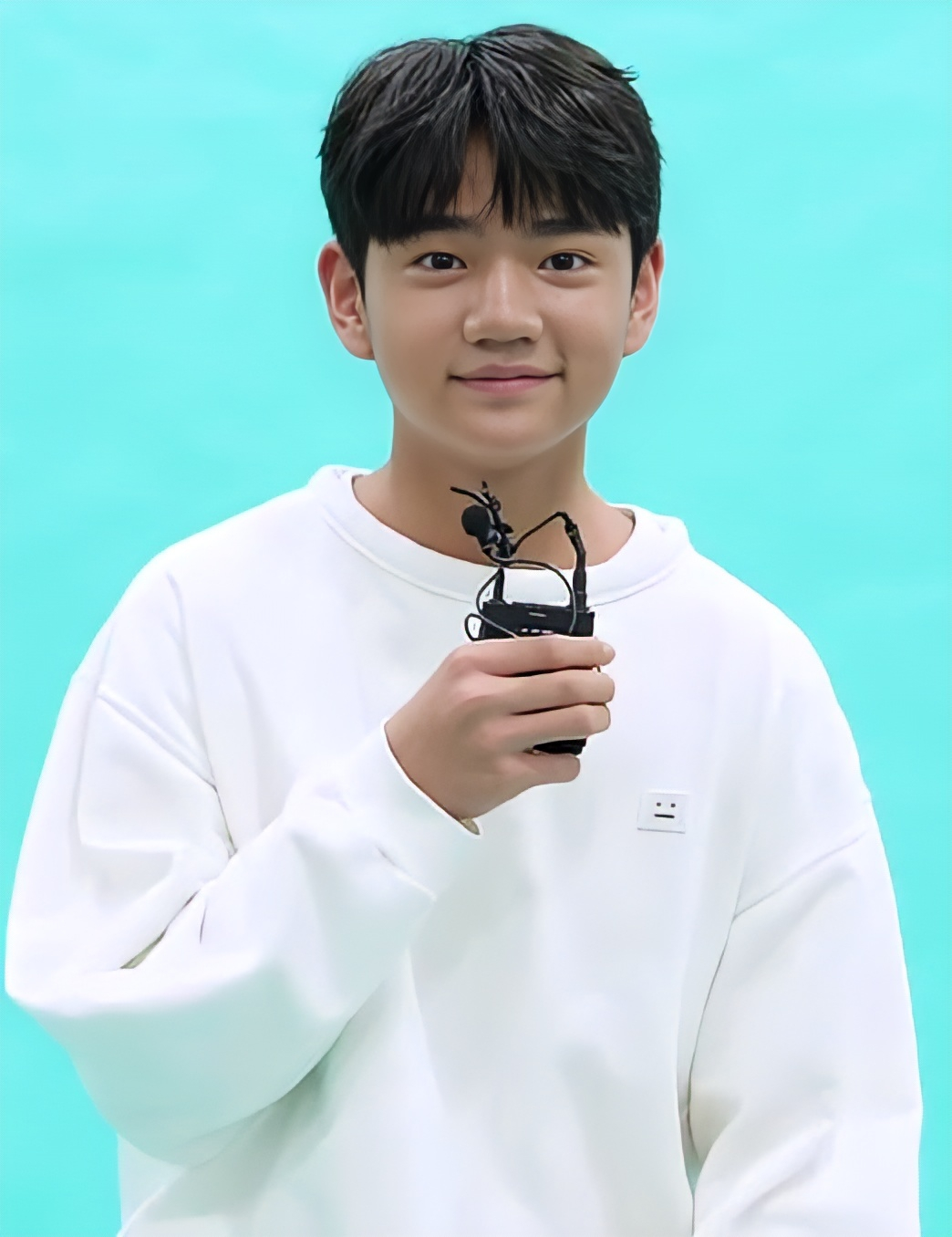
- Kim in September 2022
- Born: June 7, 2009 (age 17); Cheongju, South Korea
- Occupation: Actor
- Years active: 2013–present
- Agent: Awesome ENT

Korean name
- Hangul: 김강훈
- RR: Gim Ganghun
- MR: Kim Kanghun
- Website: Official website

Kim Kang-hoon (Korean: 김강훈; born June 7, 2009) is a South Korean actor. He is known for his roles in the television series Pride and Prejudice (2014), Criminal Minds (2017), Mr. Sunshine (2018), When the Camellia Blooms (2019), and Racket Boys (2021). Currently, he is under an exclusive contract with Awesome ENT.

== Career ==
Kim made his debut in 2013, appearing in MBC Every 1 entertainment show Mom and Dad from Today. He gained recognition for his roles in Pride and Prejudice (2014), Criminal Minds (2017), and Mr. Sunshine (2018).

In 2019, Kim played a notable role in KBS2 drama When the Camellia Blooms as Kang Pil-gu – son of a single mother played by Gong Hyo-jin. The drama became second highest rated mini-series aired in 2019. For his performance, Kim won Best Young Actor Award at 2019 KBS Drama Awards and was nominated for the Best New Actor – Television at 56th Baeksang Arts Awards being one of the category's youngest nominees.

In 2020, Kim won Rookie Award in Variety Category at 2020 MBC Entertainment Awards for his appearances in King of Mask Singer, Those Who Cross the Line, and Omniscient Interfering View becoming the youngest recipient of the award.

In 2021, Kim starred in SBS drama Racket Boys as Lee Yong-tae; youngest member of badminton club, marking his first major role.

In February 2022, Kim signed an exclusive contract with Awesome ENT as his first agency since his debut.

In 2022, he appears in TVING series Dr. Park's Clinic and JTBC drama Reborn Rich.

In 2024, he played Baek Noa in the Apple TV+ series Pachinko.

== Filmography ==
=== Film ===
Year	Title	Role	Notes	Ref.
2017	Because I Love You	Park Jung-min		
2017	Lucid Dream	Choi Min-woo		
2018	Cheese in the Trap	Yoo-jung (young)		
2019	Exit	Ji-ho		
2019	Metamorphosis	Woo-jong		
2019	Black Money	Bae Dong-ji's son	Cameo	
2021	Recalled			
2021	Miracle: Letters to the President	Jun-kyung (young)		
2022	Project Wolf Hunting	Lee Do-il's son	Cameo	
2025	The Match	Lee Chang-ho (young)		

=== Television series ===
Year	Title	Role	Notes	Ref.
2014–2015	Pride and Prejudice	Kim Chan		
2016	Come Back Mister	Young-chan		
2016	Listen to Love	Do Joon-soo		
2017	Good Manager	Kim Sung-ryong (young)		
2017	Bad Thief, Good Thief	Jang Dol-mok (young)		
2017	Criminal Minds	Kang Han-byul		
2017–2018	Oh, the Mysterious	Kim Jong-sam (child)		
2018	Mr. Sunshine	Choi Yoo-jin (child)		
2018	Children of Nobody	Han Si-wan		
2018	Ambergris	Son		
2019	Clean with Passion for Now	Ye-joon	Cameo (Episode 8, 15–16)	
2019	Romance Is a Bonus Book	Cha Eun-ho (young)	Cameo (Episode 2)	
2019	Hotel del Luna	Goo Chan-sung (young)	Cameo (Episode 1,16)	
2019	When the Camellia Blooms	Kang Pil-goo		
2019	My Country: The New Age	Nam Sun-ho (young)	Cameo (Episode 2,4,7)	
2020	The Game: Towards Zero	Goo Do-kyung / Jo Hyun-woo (young)	Cameo	
2020	18 Again	Seo Ji-ho (young)		
2020	Start-Up	Nam Do-san (young)		
2021	Mr. Queen	King Cheoljong (young)		
2021	Mouse	Jae-hoon		
2021	Racket Boys	Lee Yong-tae		
2022	Reborn Rich	Jin Do-joon (young)		
2023	Kokdu: Season of Deity	Goddess		

=== Web series ===
Year	Title	Role	Notes	Ref.
2020	Kingdom 2	Yi Yeom	Cameo (Episode 6)	
2022	Dr. Park's Clinic	Park Dong-goo		
2023–2024	Death's Game	Kwon Hyuk-soo	Cameo	
2024	Goodbye Earth			

=== Television shows ===
Year	Title	Role	Notes	Ref.
2013	Mom and Dad from Today	Cast member		
2020	King of Mask Singer	Contestant	as "Report Card A+" (ep. 253)	
2021–2022	We're Family	Cast member		

=== Hosting ===
Year	Title	Role	Notes	Ref.
2020	2020 KBS Drama Awards	Special MC (part 1)	with Do Kyung-wan and Jo Bo-ah	

== Ambassadorship ==
Year	Title	Ref.
2013	Chungbuk Safety Experience Center Public Relations Ambassador	
2020	Cultural Heritage Channel Video Contest Promotion Ambassador	
2021	Korea Centers for Disease Control and Prevention (KCDC) Vaccination Ambassador	

== Awards and nominations ==
Name of the award ceremony, year presented, category, nominee of the award, and the result of the nomination
Award ceremony	Year	Category	Nominee / Work	Result	Ref.
APAN Star Awards	2024	Best Young Actor	Death's Game, Goodbye Earth	Nominated	
Baeksang Arts Awards	2020	Best New Actor – Television	When the Camellia Blooms	Nominated	
Brand Customer Loyalty Award	2021	Best Young Actor	Kim Kang-hoon	Won	
KBS Drama Awards	2019	Best Young Actor	When the Camellia Blooms	Won	
KBS Drama Awards	2019	Best Couple Award	Kim Kang-hoon (with Kim Ji-seok); When the Camellia Blooms	Nominated	
MBC Entertainment Awards	2020	Rookie Award in Variety Category – Male	King of Mask Singer; Those Who Cross the Line; Omniscient Interfering View	Won	
SBS Drama Awards	2021	Best Supporting Team (Note: with Kim Min-ki, Lee Ji-won, Jung Min-seong, Kim Kang-hoon, Cha Mi-kyung and Shin Cheol-jin)	Racket Boys	Won	
