= Kim Min-gi =

South Korean actor (born 2002)

- Born: November 22, 2002 (age 23); Chuncheon, South Korea
- Occupation: Actor
- Years active: 2020–present
- Agent: SaSooJaRi Company

Korean name
- Hangul: 김민기
- RR: Gim Mingi
- MR: Kim Min'gi

Kim Min-gi (Korean: 김민기; born November 22, 2002), is a South Korean actor. He is best known for his roles in True Beauty (2020), Racket Boys (2021) and Under the Queen's Umbrella (2022).

== Filmography ==
=== Television series ===
Year	Title	Role	Notes	Ref.
2020	True Beauty	Lim Joo-young		
2021	Racket Boys	Jung In-sol		
2021	The King of Tears, Lee Bang-won	Prince Chungnyeong / King Sejong		
2022	Under the Queen's Umbrella	Prince Bogum		
2024	Lovely Runner	Park Do-jun	Cameo (Ep. 13)	
2024	O'PENing	Na Woo-ri	episode: "Our Beautiful Summer"	
2024	Face Me	Woo Min-jae	Cameo (Ep. 5–6)	

=== Web series ===
Year	Title	Role	Ref.
2020	The Temperature Of Language: Our Nineteen	Min Gyeong-hu	
2020	Pop Out Boy!	Han Yi-deun	
2021	Adult Trainee	Choi Kang-joon	
2025	Dear Hongrang	In-hoe	

=== Television shows ===
Year	Title	Role	Notes	Ref.
2021	The Racket Boys	Club members		

== Awards and nominations ==
Name of the award ceremony, year presented, category, nominee of the award, and the result of the nomination
Award ceremony	Year	Category	Nominee / Work	Result	Ref.
KBS Drama Awards	2022	Best New Actor	The King of Tears, Lee Bang-won	Nominated	
Korean Culture Entertainment Awards	2021	Rookie of the Year Award	Kim Min-gi	Won	
Korea Grand Prize Awards	2021	10 People Who Shined Korea – New Actor	Kim Min-gi	Won	
SBS Drama Awards	2021	Best Supporting Team (Note: with Lee Ji-won, Jung Min-seong, Kim Kang-hoon, Cha Mi-kyung and Shin Cheol-jin)	Racket Boys	Won	
