= Shin Jung-geun =

South Korean actor

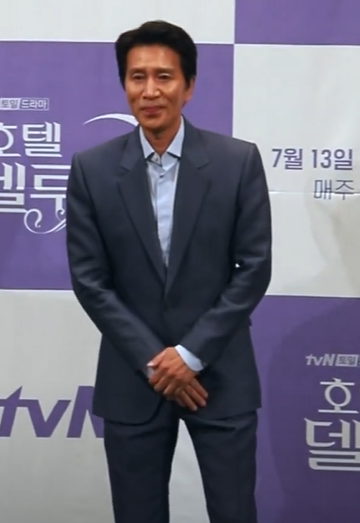
- Shin in 2019
- Born: September 26, 1966 (age 60); Yeonggwang County, South Jeolla Province, South Korea
- Education: Anyang Science University - Electronic Engineering
- Occupation: Actor
- Years active: 1997–present
- Agent: Artist Company

Korean name
- Hangul: 신정근
- RR: Sin Jeonggeun
- MR: Sin Chŏnggŭn

Shin Jung-geun (Korean: 신정근; born September 26, 1966) is a South Korean actor. He is most active as a supporting actor in films such as Running Turtle (2009), In Love and War (2011), The Grand Heist (2012), and The Five (2013), as well as the television drama Pinocchio (2014), Rough Cut (2008), and Encounter (2018–19).

== Filmography ==
=== Film ===
Year	Title	Role
1997	1818 (Profanity)	Policeman 1/Patrolman 2
2002	Sympathy for Mr. Vengeance	Laborer 3
2002	Champion	Kim Yun-gu
2003	Wild Card	Neob-chi
2003	Once Upon a Time in a Battlefield	Kim Heum-soon
2004	When I Turned Nine	Black Swallow's father
2004	Hi! Dharma 2: Showdown in Seoul	Man in hat (cameo)
2005	King and the Clown	Lee Geuk-kyun
2006	Oh! My God	Agari
2006	Bloody Tie	Section chief Go
2006	Mission Sex Control	Chok-sae
2006	Radio Star	Misari president Nam (cameo)
2007	My Tutor Friend 2	Film professor
2007	The Happy Life	Club owner (cameo)
2007	Bunt	Sang-chul
2008	The Devil's Game	Waterfowl
2008	Sunny	Battalion commander (cameo)
2008	The Divine Weapon	Pan-soo
2009	Running Turtle	Yong-bae
2009	Lifting King Kong	Oldest brother (cameo)
2009	Goodbye Mom	Joon-won
2010	Blades of Blood	Nobleman Yoo
2010	He's on Duty	Detective Choi (cameo)
2011	Battlefield Heroes	Kim Heum-soon
2011	In Love and War	Bong-ki
2012	Howling	Chief detective Seo
2012	Over My Dead Body	Team leader Jo
2012	Runway Cop	Squad chief Yoo
2012	The Grand Heist	Seok Dae-hyun
2012	Masquerade	Lee Jeong-rang
2012	Almost Che	So Kyung-jung (cameo)
2013	Secretly, Greatly	Mr. Park
2013	Tough as Iron	Yagami
2013	The Five	Nam-cheol
2014	A Hard Day	Chief of homicide
2014	The Pirates	Yong-gap
2015	Enemies In-Law	Han Dal-sik
2016	Duel: Final Round	Elder Hwang
2017	Man of Will	Jo Deok-pal
2018	The Soup	Soon-sik
2019	The Odd Family: Zombie On Sale	Chief Oh
2020	Steel Rain 2: Summit	Second in command
2022	Alienoid	Right King
2022	Birth	Im Chi-hwa

=== Television series ===
Year	Title	Role
2009	The Slingshot	Loan shark
2009	City Hall	Director Ji
2009	Style	So Byung-shik
2011	Scent of a Woman	Noh Sang-shik
2013	KBS Drama Special: "Sirius"	Lee Hyun-gu
2014	Pinocchio	Choi Dal-pyung
2015	Who Are You: School 2015	Dean of students
2015	The Time We Were Not in Love	Oh Jung-geun
2017	Untouchable	Yong Hak-soo
2018	Mr. Sunshine	servant
2018	Encounter	
2019	Hotel del Luna	Kim Seon-bi
2021	Racket Boys	PET at Haenam Seo Middle School
2023	The Killing Vote	Choi Jin-soo

== Awards and nominations ==
Year	Award	Category	Nominated work	Result	Ref.
2009	10th Busan Film Critics Awards	Best Supporting Actor	Running Turtle	Won	
2011	33rd Golden Cinematography Awards	Most Popular Actor	Battlefield Heroes	Won	
2020	29th Buil Film Awards	Best Supporting Actor	Steel Rain 2: Summit	Nominated	
2020	7th Korean Film Producers Association Award	Best Supporting Actor	Steel Rain 2: Summit	Won	
2021	41st Blue Dragon Film Awards	Best Supporting Actor	Steel Rain 2: Summit	Nominated	
2021	57th Baeksang Arts Awards	Best Supporting Actor (Film)	Steel Rain 2: Summit	Nominated	
2021	26th Chunsa Film Art Awards 2021	Best Supporting Actor	Steel Rain 2: Summit	Nominated	
2021	SBS Drama Awards	Best Supporting Actor in a Mini-Series Genre/Fantasy Drama	Racket Boys	Nominated	
2023	2023 SBS Drama Awards	Best Supporting Performance in a Miniseries Genre/Action Drama	The Killing Vote	Nominated	
