= Pride and Prejudice (2014 TV series) =

2014 South Korean television series

- Promotional poster
- Hangul: 오만과 편견
- Hanja: 傲慢과 偏見
- RR: Omangwa pyeongyeon
- MR: Oman'gwa p'yŏn'gyŏn
- Genre: Legal drama; Romance; Comedy
- Written by: Lee Hyun-joo
- Directed by: Kim Jin-min
- Starring: Choi Jin-hyuk; Baek Jin-hee; Choi Min-soo; Lee Tae-hwan; Son Chang-min
- Country of origin: South Korea
- Original language: Korean
- No. of episodes: 21

Production
- Executive producer: Lee Chang-sup
- Producers: Kim Ho-joon; Moon Seok-hwan; Oh Kwang-hee
- Production companies: Munhwa Broadcasting Corporation; Bon Factory Worldwide

Original release
- Network: Munhwa Broadcasting Corporation
- Release: October 27, 2014 – January 13, 2015

Pride and Prejudice (Korean: 오만과 편견; RR: Omangwa pyeongyeon) is a 2014 South Korean television series starring Choi Jin-hyuk, Baek Jin-hee, Choi Min-soo, Lee Tae-hwan and Son Chang-min. It aired on MBC from October 27, 2014, to January 13, 2015, on Mondays and Tuesdays at 22:00 for 21 episodes.

== Plot ==
Gu Dong-chi passed the bar exam right after high school (bypassing college altogether) and became a prosecutor at age 21. With his brilliant legal mind and over ten years of experience since, Dong-chi has sharpened his skills of figuring out what other people are really thinking, even as he keeps his own private thoughts inscrutable and enjoys the perks of the bureaucratic system.

Han Yeol-mu is a prosecutor-in-training who gets assigned under Dong-chi. Yeol-mu was once a detective, and she decided to become a public prosecutor because of her dogged pursuit of truth and justice.

Dong-chi finds himself working with Yeol-mu, and along with cool-headed veteran prosecutor Moon Hee-man, investigator and former taekwondo athlete Kang Soo, and loose-tongued unemployed gambler Jung Chang-gi, they form a team of "loser prosecutors" who fight for innocent, poor, and powerless citizens and battle against crime, prideful authorities, and a prejudiced system.

== Cast ==
=== Main characters ===
- Choi Jin-hyuk as Goo Dong-chi
  - Noh Tae-yeop as young Goo Dong-chi
- Baek Jin-hee as Han Yeol-moo
  - Park Si-eun as young Han Yeol-moo
- Choi Min-soo as Moon Hee-man
- Lee Tae-hwan as Kang Soo / Seo Tae-won
- Son Chang-min as Jung Chang-gi

=== Supporting characters ===
- Choi Woo-shik as Lee Jang-won
- Jang Hang-sun as Yoo Dae-gi
- Jung Hye-sung as Yoo Kwang-mi
- Roh Joo-hyun as Lee Jong-gon
- Kim Yeo-jin as Oh Do-jung
- Baek Soo-ryun as Baek Geum-ok
- Kim Na-woon as Kim Myung-sook
- Kim Kang-hoon as Kim Chan
- Jung Chan as Choi Gwang-gook
- Han Gap-soo as Goo Young-bae
- Song Sam-dong as Kwon Dae-yong
- Lee Hyun-gul as Baek Sang-dae
- Jung Ji-hoon as Han Byul
- Kim Hae-na as Cha Yoon-hee
- Kim Hye-yoon as Kang Han-na (Ep. 15)

=== Cameos ===
- Jung Sung-mo as Han Byul's mother
- Kwak Ji-min as Song Ah-reum
- Jung Chan as Choi Kwang-gook
- Im Seung-dae as Kang Moo-sung
- Choi Joon-yong as Oh Tae-gyun
- Maeng Sang-hoon as Park Soon-bae

== Ratings ==
As reported by Nielsen Korea, the evening drama premiered on October 27, 2014, with an 11.2% rating, recording the highest rating in its time slot, significantly ahead of its competition, Naeil's Cantabile (KBS2) and Secret Door (SBS).

Episode #	Original broadcast date	Average audience share			
Episode #	Original broadcast date	TNmS Ratings		AGB Nielsen	
Episode #	Original broadcast date	Nationwide	Seoul National Capital Area	Nationwide	Seoul National Capital Area
1	October 27, 2014	9.3%	11.5%	11.2%	13%
2	October 28, 2014	8.3%	11.0%	11.0%	12.4%
3	November 3, 2014	9.6%	13.4%	11.6%	13.5%
4	November 4, 2014	10.1%	13.0%	10.8%	12.6%
5	November 10, 2014	10.6%	14.6%	12.1%	13.9%
6	November 11, 2014	11.0%	13.7%	12.8%	15.1%
7	November 17, 2014	11.0%	14.6%	10.7%	12.0%
8	November 24, 2014	10.5%	13.4%	11.3%	13.2%
9	November 25, 2014	10.3%	13.7%	11.9%	13.5%
10	December 1, 2014	10.2%	13.7%	10.3%	11.5%
11	December 2, 2014	11.1%	14.4%	11.1%	12.3%
12	December 8, 2014	9.8%	12.6%	9.7%	11.1%
13	December 9, 2014	9.8%	12.9%	10.6%	11.7%
14	December 15, 2014	9.2%	12.0%	9.2%	10.4%
15	December 16, 2014	10.2%	13.7%	9.9%	11.1%
16	December 22, 2014	9.2%	13.1%	9.4%	10.6%
17	December 23, 2014	9.7%	13.0%	10.0%	11.3%
18	January 5, 2015	7.7%	10.4%	8.4%	9.7%
19	January 6, 2015	8.8%	11.6%	8.2%	8.6%
20	January 12, 2015	9.4%	12.5%	8.0%	8.6%
21	January 13, 2015	9.3%	12.5%	9.7%	10.8%
Average		9.8%	12.9%	10.4%	11.8%

== Awards and nominations ==
Year	Award	Category	Recipient	Result
2014	MBC Drama Awards	Drama of the Year	Pride and Prejudice	Nominated
2014	MBC Drama Awards	Excellence Award, Actor in a Special Project Drama	Choi Jin-hyuk	Won
2014	MBC Drama Awards	Excellence Award, Actress in a Special Project Drama	Baek Jin-hee	Won
2014	MBC Drama Awards	Golden Acting Award, Actor	Choi Min-soo	Won
2014	MBC Drama Awards	Best Couple Award	Choi Jin-hyuk and Baek Jin-hee	Nominated
2014	MBC Drama Awards	Popularity Award, Actor	Choi Jin-hyuk	Nominated
2014	MBC Drama Awards	Popularity Award, Actress	Baek Jin-hee	Nominated
