= Jo Jae-yoon =

South Korean actor

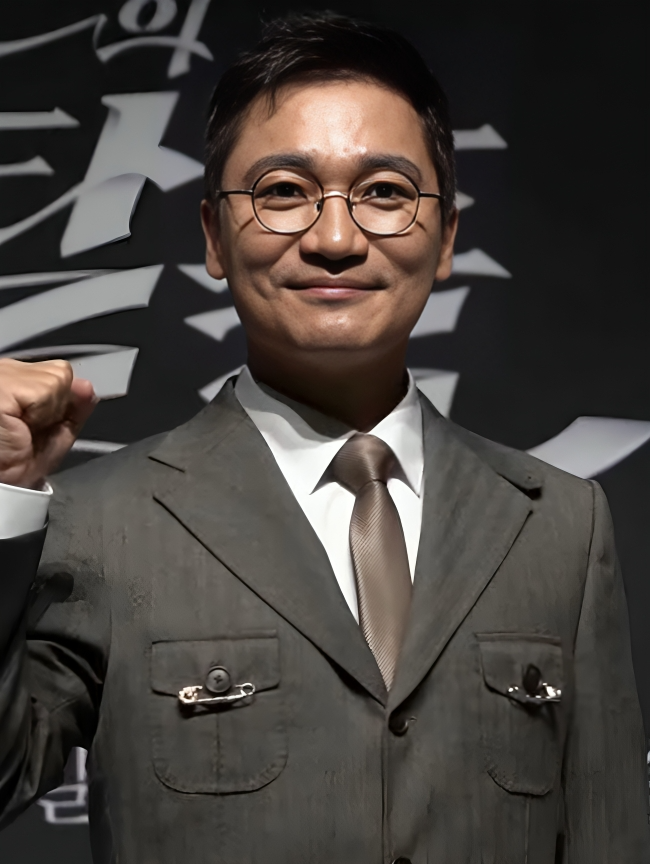
- Jo in October 2023
- Born: October 29, 1974 (age 52); Cheongju, South Korea
- Other name: Jo Jae-yun
- Education: Seoul Institute of the Arts – Theater
- Occupation: Actor
- Years active: 2003–present
- Agent: MK Entertainment
- Spouse: Cho Eun-ae (m. 2015)

Korean name
- Hangul: 조재윤
- Hanja: 趙在允
- RR: Jo Jaeyun
- MR: Cho Chaeyun
- Website: bbent.co.kr/jo.php

Jo Jae-yoon (Korean: 조재윤; born October 29, 1974) is a South Korean actor. He made his acting debut in 2003 and has since starred as a supporting actor in numerous films and television series, including The Man from Nowhere (2010), The Chaser (2012), Gu Family Book (2013), The Suspect (2013), Descendants of the Sun (2016), Mad Dog (2017), Sky Castle (2018–2019), and Alchemy of Souls season 1 and 2 (2022–2023). Jo also appeared in the variety-reality show Animals (2015).

== Filmography ==
=== Film ===
Year	Title	Role	Notes	Ref.
2003	Please Teach Me English	Manager Hong		
2004	Au Revoir, UFO	Employee at last stop		
2005	The President's Last Bang	Security guard		
2006	Love Me Not	Keun-son		
2006	The Restless	Person of low caste		
2008	Story of Wine			
2009	Marine Boy	Department head Im		
2009	The Scam	Deputy Lee		
2009	Take Off	Adoption agency employee 1		
2009	City of Fathers	Nal-chi		
2010	The Man from Nowhere	Jang Doo-sik		
2010	Mr. Zombie	Jo Yong-pal		
2010	Romantic Debtors	Tow truck driver		
2010	The Yellow Sea	Truck driver at Busan port		
2011	Late Blossom	Kun-bong's brother-in-law		
2011	Officer of the Year	Jo Tae-bok		
2011	S.I.U.	Informant		
2011	Poison Frog	Yeon-bok	Short film	
2012	Romance Joe	Food stall owner		
2013	Miracle in Cell No. 7	Prison guard Kim		
2013	Mr. Go	Orthopedic doctor		
2013	The Suspect	Captain Jo		
2014	Dad for Rent	Seung-il		
2015	Casa Amor: Exclusive for Ladies	Jo Ji-ho	Cameo	
2015	The Deal	Kim Ki-seok		
2015	Inside Men	Section Chief Bang		
2016	Mood of the Day	Senior Kang		
2016	Insane	Detective Park		
2017	I'm Doing Fine in Middle School	Doctor Jo		
2017	The Prison	Hong-pyo		
2017	Part-Time Spy	Deputy Department Head Park		
2017	House of the Disappeared	Chul-joong		
2017	Memoir of a Murderer	Doctor		
2017	The Outlaws	Boss Hwang Choon-sik		
2017	The Age of Blood	Do Man-chul		
2018	The Pension	Jae Deok		
2019	Forever	Lee Jin-soo		
2020	The Golden Holiday	Detective Ahn		
2020	P1H: The Beginning of a New World	Chaeyoon's father / Present		
2021	Sseol	Lee Chung-moo		
2021	Brother	Yong-sik		
2021	Voice	Deokpal	Special appearance	
2022	Hansan: Rising Dragon	Manabe		
2022	Take Off: Standing on the Waves	Yoon Jae	Independent film	
2022	Hero	Woo Deok-soon		
2023	Taste of Horror – The Beginning		Short Film	

=== Television series ===
Year	Title	Role	Notes	Ref.
2007	H.I.T			
2007	Kid Gang			
2007	Lee San, Wind of the Palace	Kkak Jung-yi		
2008	Crime 2			
2008	Fight			
2008	East of Eden	Gang action leader		
2009	Dream	Gal-chi		
2009	Joseon Mystery Detective Jeong Yak-yong			
2010	Jungle Fish 2	P.E. Teacher		
2010	Secret Garden	Photographer	Cameo (Episode 2)	
2011	Detectives in Trouble	Yang Do-soo	Cameo (Episode 1)	
2012	Hero	Young-joon		
2012	A Gentleman's Dignity	Police officer	Cameo (Episode 1)	
2012	The Chaser	Park Yong-sik		
2012	KBS Drama Special	Bong-sik	Episode "Butcher Barber"	
2012	KBS Drama Special	Hong Man-sik	Episode "The Great Dipper"	
2012	My Lover, Madame Butterfly	Kyung-chal	Cameo	
2012	Full House Take 2	Korean-Chinese taxi driver		
2012	Jeon Woo-chi	Cheol-gyeon		
2013	Gu Family Book	Ma Bong-chul		
2013	Monstar	Manager Hong		
2013	The Blade and Petal	Boo-chi		
2013	Master's Sun	Man with dead fiancée	Cameo (Episode 14)	
2013	Reply 1994	Kim Jae-young	Cameo (Episode 12)	
2013	Empress Ki	Kolta		
2014	KBS Drama Special	Han Jung-hoon	Episode "Illegal Parking"	
2014	Liar Game	Jo Dal-gu		
2015	Blood	Woo Il-nam		
2015	Let's Eat 2	Mi-ran's husband	Cameo (Episode 9)	
2015	Late Night Restaurant	Gwang-jo	Cameo (Episode 11)	
2015	Last	Baemnun		
2016	Descendants of the Sun	Jin Young-soo		
2016	Pied Piper	Han Ji-hoon		
2016	Click Your Heart	Neoz High history teacher		
2016	Fantastic	Oh Chang-seok		
2016	Woman with a Suitcase	Na Gil-tae	Cameo (Episode 1)	
2016	My Runway	Mr. Bong		
2017	Voice	Triad member	Cameo (Episode 1)	
2017	Innocent Defendant	Shin Cheol-sik		
2017	Save Me	Jo Wan-tae		
2017	Hip Hop Teacher	School commissioner		
2017	Mad Dog	Park Soon-jung		
2017	Black	Grim Reaper No.007		
2018	Wok of Love	Oh Maeng-dal		
2018	Sweet Revenge 2	Rok-hee's dad		
2018	Heart Surgeons	Hwang Jin-cheol		
2018	Player	Reporter Shin	Cameo (Episode 8)	
2018–2019	Sky Castle	Dr. Woo Yang-woo		
2019	Save Me 2	Sin Pil-goo		
2019	Catch the Ghost	Lee Man-jin		
2019	Rookie Historian Goo Hae-ryung	Kim Chuk-jeom	Cameo (Episode 3)	
2020	The King: Eternal Monarch	Arcade worker	Cameo (Episode 5 & 7)	
2020	The Good Detective	Lee Dae-chul		
2020	Love Is Annoying, but I Hate Being Lonely!	Editor-in-chief	Cameo (Episode 10)	
2021	Mouse	Daniel Lee		
2021	The Penthouse: War in Life 2	Hwang Geum-bong	Cameo (Episode 9–12)	
2021	Racket Boys	comic performer as 'The End of the Earth Avengers	Cameo (Episode 7,8,14)	
2022	Alchemy of Souls	Jin Mu		
2022	Unlock My Boss		Cameo	
2023–2024	The Escape of the Seven	Nam Cheol-woo		
2024	Love Your Enemy	Park Dong Jin	Cameo	
2024	Knight Flower	Kang Pil-jik		

=== Web series ===
Year	Title	Role	Ref.
2016	Matching! Boys Archery	Coach	
2022	Big Bet		

=== Television shows ===
Year	Title	Role	Notes	Ref.
2015	Animals	Cast member		
2018	Law of the Jungle in Patagonia	Cast member	Episode 305–310; Part of second-half cast member.	
2018	Sea Police	Main cast	Season 1	
2019	Urban Cops	Main cast	Season 1	
2019	Urban Cops: KCSI	Main cast	Season 2	
2019	Coffee Friends	Guest	Episodes 2–5, 8–10	
2020	Scent of the Sea / Can I Take Your Order	Main cast		
2020	Sea Police 2	Main cast	Season 2	
2020	The Devil Wears Jung Nam	Main cast		
2021	Ho Dong's Camping Zone: Let's Choose	Regular Member		
2021	Documentary 3 Days	Narrator	episode Chasers-Seoul's Scientific Investigation Unit 72 Hours	
2021	Genius Jigol	Cast Member		
2022	The Power of Superfoods	Storyteller		
2022	Brave Detectives	Special MC	Season 2	
2022–2023	Second House	Cast Member	Season 1–2	

== Theater ==
Year	Title	Role	Reprised
	The Magic Wings		
	The Stepping Stone		
	Subway Line 1		
	The Tempest		
2004	The Human Comedy	Grandfather/Detective/Dancer	2007–2008, 2008–2009, 2013
2007	The Bald Soprano	Fire chief	2011
2013	University of Laughs	Censor	2014
2015-2016	Le Passe-Muraille	Prosecutor	

== Awards and nominations ==
Year	Award	Category	Nominated work	Result
2012	SBS Drama Awards	Special Award, Actor in a Miniseries	The Chaser	Nominated
2016	2nd Scene Stealer Festival	Scene Stealer Award (Male)	Descendants of the Sun	Won
2016	9th Korea Drama Awards	Excellence Award, Actor	Descendants of the Sun	Won
2016	30th KBS Drama Awards	Best Supporting Actor	Descendants of the Sun	Nominated
2017	31st KBS Drama Awards	Best Supporting Actor	Mad Dog	Nominated
2017	SBS Drama Awards	Best Supporting Actor	Innocent Defendant	Nominated
2020	Korean Popular Culture and Arts Awards	Minister of Culture, Sports and Tourism Commendation	—N/a	Won
2021	Hallyu Culture Awards	New Stealer Award	Mouse	Won
2022	2022 KBS Entertainment Awards	Best Couple Award (with Joo Sang-wook)	2nd House	Won
