= From Now On, Showtime! =

2022 South korean fantasy television series

- Promotional poster
- Also known as: Showtime Begins!; It's Showtime!
- Hangul: 지금부터, 쇼타임!
- RR: Jigeumbuteo, syotaim!
- MR: Chigŭmbut'ŏ, syot'aim!
- Genre: Romantic comedy; Fantasy
- Created by: Hong Seok-woo (MBC); Viu (production investment)
- Written by: Ha Yoon-ah
- Directed by: Lee Hyeong-min; Jeong Sang-hee
- Starring: Park Hae-jin; Jin Ki-joo; Jung Joon-ho
- Country of origin: South Korea
- Original language: Korean
- No. of episodes: 16

Production
- Running time: 60 minutes
- Production company: Samhwa Networks
- Budget: ₩7.472 billion

Original release
- Network: MBC TV
- Release: April 23 – June 12, 2022

From Now On, Showtime! (Korean: 지금부터, 쇼타임!; RR: Jigeumbuteo, syotaim!) is a 2022 South Korean television series starring Park Hae-jin, Jin Ki-joo, and Jung Joon-ho. The series, directed by Lee Hyeong-min and Jeong Sang-hee for Samhwa Networks, is about a mysterious magician, Cha Cha-woong, and a hot-blooded policewoman working with ghosts to solve cases based on hidden clues. It premiered on MBC on April 23, 2022, and aired every Saturday and Sunday at 20:40 (KST) till June 12, 2022. It was also pre-sold to OTT media services in over 190 countries.

== Synopsis ==
The series is a romantic comedy between Cha Cha-woong (Park Hae-jin), a magician and employer of ghosts, and Go Seul-hae (Jin Ki-joo), a passionate but hot blooded female police officer with supernatural powers.

== Cast and characters ==
=== Main ===
- Park Hae-jin as Cha Cha-woong, a ghost employer and famous magician.
  - Seo Dong-hyun as young Cha Cha-woong
- Jin Ki-joo as Go Seul-hae, a hot blooded cop with supernatural powers.
  - Oh Ye-ju as young Go Seul-hae
- Jung Joon-ho as General Choi Gum, who protects Cha Cha-woong's family from generation to generation

=== Supporting ===
==== People around Cha Woong ====
- Jung Suk-yong as Deputy Nam Sang-geon

Father Teresa of 'Magic Factory'.

- Ko Kyu-pil as Ma Dong-cheol

In charge of power, a chief magician. He is a former gangster with a phoenix-patterned shirt and a gold necklace.

- Park Seo-yeon as Kang Ah-reum

In charge of mechanical and electronic equipment, a beautiful employee.

- Kim Won-hae as Park Soo-moodang / Cha Sa-geum

Cha Woong's shaman grandfather. He has served the general god Choi Gum all throughout his life.

- Cha Mi-kyung as Na Geum-ok

Cha Sa-geum's longtime colleague. She has the 'Immortal Grandma' as her body.

- Jang Ha-eun as Cheon Ye-ji, granddaughter of Na Geum-ok.

==== People around Go Seul-hae ====
- Kim Jong-tae as Ko Young-sik
- Kim Jong-hoon as Seo Hee-soo, Go Seul-hae's longtime unrequited love, and the police detective team leader.

==== Police ====
- Jeong Jae-sung as Seo Chang-ho, Hee-soo's father
- Choi Moo-in as Min Hong-sik, gag maniac police station chief.
- Ahn Jung-kwon as Kim Il-kyung, a sincere and reliable sergeant as Seul-hae's senior.
- Kim Hee-jae as Lee Yong-ryeol.

An adjunct gunner and patrol partner for Seul-hae

- Yang Joo-ho as Byeon Tae-sik, a detective at a powerful police station.
- Choi Young-woo as An Shi-hoon, the youngest detective
- Kim Jong-hoon as Hee-su

=== Others ===
- Ahn Chang-hwan as Tae-chun, it is that will instill intense tension.
- Seo Dong-hyun
- Ha Sung-kwang
- Lee Eun-gyeol
- Choi So-yul as Si-eun

=== Special appearances ===
- Shin Hyun-joon as Grim reaper
- Park Seul-gi as MC entertainment information program
- Choi Sung-won as Minho
- Han Cho-won as Aris
- Hong Soo-hyun as Virgin ghost
- Im Won-hee as God of heaven

== Production ==
Park Hae-jin was confirmed as the main lead in the series in May 2021. Jin Ki-joo was offered the main lead opposite Park Hae-jin in July 2021. Jung Joon-ho received an offer to appear in the series in August 2021.

Samhwa Networks signed a supply contract with PCCW, Vuclip in Singapore to sell the worldwide broadcasting rights licenses on September 27, 2021, for ten years.

The script reading for the series was held on October 6, 2021, at MBC in Sangam, Mapo District, Seoul, and filming began on October 14.

There will also be works of art by actor Park Ki-woong that have not yet aired in the drama.

On February 18, 2022, the script reading was released.

== Original soundtracks ==
From Now On, Showtime!

Soundtrack album by Various
- Released: 2022
- Genre: Soundtrack
- Languages: Korean; English
- Labels: 2%Entertainment; Music Ground; Abyss Company

=== Part 1 ===
Released on April 20, 2022
No.	Title	Lyrics	Music	Artist	Length
1.	"Freak Show"	Zozo (ELDORADO), Park Bo-jeong, Heo Jeong-eun, Yoon Kyung, Audi Mok, Tysha Tiar	Zaydro, Audi Mok, Tysha Tiar	Jeon So-yeon	3:34
2.	"Freak Show" (inst.)				3:34

=== Part 2 ===
Released on April 24, 2022
No.	Title	Lyrics	Music	Artist	Length
1.	"I'll Be There"	RGBY	RGBY	Ahn Da-eun	4:33
2.	"I'll Be There" (inst.)				4:33

=== Part 3 ===
Released on May 1, 2022
No.	Title	Lyrics	Music	Artist	Length
1.	"Time"	Kim Dae-won	Dohyeong Lee(AUG), Kim Daewon	Paulkyte	3:37
2.	"Time" (inst.)				3:37

=== Part 4 ===
Released on May 8, 2022
No.	Title	Lyrics	Music	Artist	Length
1.	"Eheradiya" (에헤라디야)	My Neighbor's Bachelor, Brandon Paik	Bachelor Next Door, Brandon Paik	Bae Ki-sung	3:11
2.	"Eheradiya" (inst.)				3:11

=== Part 5 ===
Released on May 15, 2022
No.	Title	Lyrics	Music	Artist	Length
1.	"FALLIN"	ONCLASSA	Kim Chang-rak, Kim Soo-bin, Jo Sae-hee (AIMING)	Kim Hee-jae	3:11
2.	"FALLIN" (inst.)				3:11

=== Part 6 ===
Released on May 22, 2022
No.	Title	Lyrics	Music	Artist	Length
1.	"YOU YOU YOU"	Bronco Division	Bronco Division	Floody	3:47
2.	"YOU YOU YOU" (inst.)				3:47

=== Part 7 ===
Released on May 29, 2022
No.	Title	Lyrics	Music	Artist	Length
1.	"Dandelion Seed" (민들레씨)	WARMIT	WARMIT	Thick	3:01
2.	"Dandelion Seed" (inst.)				3:01

== Viewership ==
From Now On, Showtime : South Korea viewers per episode (thousands)

Season	Episode number																Average
Season	1	2	3	4	5	6	7	8	9	10	11	12	13	14	15	16	Average
1	N/A	N/A	697	N/A	N/A	823	651	883	612	740	647	756	N/A	N/A	N/A	732	N/A

Source: Audience measurement performed nationwide by °Nielsen Korea.

Ep.	Original broadcast date	Average audience share		
Ep.	Original broadcast date	Nielsen Korea		TNmS
Ep.	Original broadcast date	Nationwide	Seoul	Nationwide
1	April 23, 2022	2.8% (29th)	—N/a	—N/a
2	April 24, 2022	3.6% (23rd)	—N/a	—N/a
3	April 30, 2022	2.3% (36th)	—N/a	—N/a
4	May 1, 2022	3.3% (25th)	—N/a	3.3% (19th)
5	May 7, 2022	2.8% (28th)	—N/a	—N/a
6	May 8, 2022	4.1% (12th)	4.3% (12th)	4.8% (9th)
7	May 14, 2022	3.3% (19th)	3.6% (18th)	—N/a
8	May 15, 2022	4.6% (8th)	4.8% (7th)	4.6% (12th)
9	May 21, 2022	2.6% (28th)	—N/a	—N/a
10	May 22, 2022	3.8% (15th)	3.9% (14th)	4.0% (17th)
11	May 28, 2022	3.2% (23rd)	—N/a	4.2% (15th)
12	May 29, 2022	4.2% (12th)	3.7% (17th)	4.4% (14th)
13	June 4, 2022	2.7% (28th)	—N/a	—N/a
14	June 5, 2022	3.1% (25th)	—N/a	3.8% (19th)
15	June 11, 2022	3.2% (26th)	—N/a	—N/a
16	June 12, 2022	4.2% (15th)	4.3% (11th)	4.7% (13th)
Average		3.4%	— (Note: Due to some ratings not recorded, the exact average rating is unknown.)	—
In this table, the blue numbers represent the lowest ratings and the red numbers represent the highest ratings.; N/A denotes that the rating is not known.

== Awards and nominations ==
Name of the award ceremony, year presented, category, nominee of the award, and the result of the nomination
Award ceremony	Year	Category	Nominee / Work	Result	Ref.
MBC Drama Awards	2022	Best Couple Award	Park Hae-jin with Jin Ki-joo	Nominated	
MBC Drama Awards	2022	Best New Actress	Park Seo-yeon	Nominated	
