= List of programs broadcast by tvN (South Korean TV channel) =

tvN logo

tvN (originally standing for Total Variety Network) is a nationwide pay television network in South Korea, owned by CJ ENM Entertainment Division. The following is a partial listing of programs broadcast by tvN, since it began its television operations on October 9, 2006.

Key

On-air

== Dramas ==
=== Monday and Tuesday ===
List of Monday and Tuesday dramas, showing the premiere date, finale date and timeslot
English title	Korean title	Premiere date	Finale date	Timeslot
I Need Romance	로맨스가 필요해	June 13, 2011	August 2, 2011	23:00
Birdie Buddy	버디버디	August 8, 2011	October 25, 2011	23:00
Flower Boy Ramen Shop	꽃미남 라면가게	October 31, 2011	December 20, 2011	23:00
Shut Up & Let's Go	닥치고 꽃미남밴드	January 30, 2012	March 20, 2012	23:00
The Wedding Scheme	결혼의 꼼수	April 2, 2012	May 22, 2012	23:00
I Love Lee Taly	아이러브 이태리	May 28, 2012	July 17, 2012	23:00
Flower Boys Next Door	이웃집 꽃미남	January 7, 2013	February 25, 2013	23:00
Nine	나인: 아홉 번의 시간여행	March 11, 2013	May 14, 2013	23:00
Dating Agency: Cyrano	연애조작단: 시라노	May 27, 2013	July 16, 2013	23:00
Who Are You?	후아유	July 29, 2013	September 17, 2013	23:00
Basketball	빠스껫 볼	October 21, 2013	December 31, 2013	22:00
I Need Romance 3	로맨스가 필요해 3	January 13, 2014	March 4, 2014	22:00
A Witch's Love	마녀의 연애	April 14, 2014	June 10, 2014	23:00
High School King of Savvy	고교처세왕	June 16, 2014	August 11, 2014	23:00
My Secret Hotel	마이 시크릿 호텔	August 18, 2014	October 14, 2014	23:00
Liar Game	라이어게임	October 20, 2014	November 18, 2014	23:00
Righteous Love	일리있는 사랑	December 1, 2014	February 3, 2015	23:00
Hogu's Love	호구의 사랑	February 9, 2015	March 31, 2015	23:00
Let's Eat 2	식샤를 합시다 2	April 6, 2015	June 2, 2015	23:00
Hidden Identity	신분을 숨겨라	June 16, 2015	August 4, 2015	23:00
Ugly Miss Young-ae 14	막돼먹은 영애씨 14	August 10, 2015	October 5, 2015	23:00
Bubble Gum	풍선껌	October 26, 2015	December 15, 2015	23:00
Cheese in the Trap	치즈인더트랩	January 4, 2016	March 1, 2016	23:00
Pied Piper	피리부는 사나이	March 7, 2016	April 26, 2016	23:00
Another Miss Oh	또 오해영	May 2, 2016	June 28, 2016	23:00
Bring It On, Ghost	싸우자귀신아	July 11, 2016	August 30, 2016	23:00
Drinking Solo	'혼술남녀	September 5, 2016	October 25, 2016	23:00
Ugly Miss Young-ae 15	막돼먹은 영애씨 15	October 31, 2016	January 3, 2017	23:00
Introverted Boss	내성적인 보스	January 16, 2017	March 14, 2017	23:00
The Liar and His Lover	그녀는 거짓말을 너무 사랑해	March 20, 2017	May 9, 2017	23:00
Circle	써클	May 22, 2017	June 27, 2017	23:00
The Bride of Habaek	하백의 신부	July 3, 2017	August 22, 2017	23:00
Argon	아르곤	September 4, 2017	September 26, 2017	23:00
Because This Is My First Life	이번 생은 처음이라	October 9, 2017	November 28, 2017	21:30
Cross	크로스	January 29, 2018	March 20, 2018	21:30
A Poem a Day	시를 잊은 그대에게	March 26, 2018	May 15, 2018	21:30
About Time	멈추고 싶은 순간: 어바웃타임	May 21, 2018	July 10, 2018	21:30
Let's Eat 3	식샤를 합시다 3	July 16, 2018	August 28, 2018	21:30
100 Days My Prince	백일의 낭군님	September 10, 2018	October 30, 2018	21:30
Mama Fairy and the Woodcutter	계룡선녀전	November 5, 2018	December 25, 2018	21:30
The Crowned Clown	왕이 된 남자	January 7, 2019	March 4, 2019	21:30
He Is Psychometric	사이코메트리 그녀석	March 11, 2019	April 30, 2019	21:30
Abyss	어비스	May 6, 2019	June 25, 2019	21:30
Designated Survivor: 60 Days	60일, 지정생존자	July 1, 2019	August 20, 2019	21:30
The Great Show	위대한 쇼	August 26, 2019	October 15, 2019	21:30
Catch the Ghost	유령을 잡아라	October 21, 2019	December 10, 2019	21:30
Black Dog: Being A Teacher	블랙독	December 16, 2019	February 4, 2020	21:30
The Cursed	방법	February 10, 2020	March 17, 2020	21:30
A Piece of Your Mind	반의 반	March 23, 2020	April 28, 2020	21:00
My Unfamiliar Family	(아는 건 별로 없지만) 가족입니다	June 1, 2020	July 21, 2020	21:00
Record of Youth	청춘기록	September 7, 2020	October 27, 2020	21:00
Birthcare Center	산후조리원	November 2, 2020	November 24, 2020	21:00
Awaken	낮과 밤	November 30, 2020	January 19, 2021	21:00
L.U.C.A.: The Beginning	루카: 더 비기닝	February 1, 2021	March 9, 2021	21:00
Navillera	나빌레라	March 22, 2021	April 27, 2021	21:00
Doom at Your Service	어느 날 우리 집 현관으로 멸망이 들어왔다	May 10, 2021	June 29, 2021	21:00
You Are My Spring	너는 나의 봄	July 5, 2021	August 24, 2021	21:00
High Class	하이클래스	September 6, 2021	November 1, 2021	22:30
Secret Royal Inspector & Joy	어사와 조이	November 8, 2021	December 28, 2021	22:30
Ghost Doctor	고스트 닥터	January 3, 2022	February 22, 2022	22:30
Military Prosecutor Doberman	군검사 도베르만	February 28, 2022	April 26, 2022	22:30
Link: Eat, Love, Kill	링크: 먹고 사랑하라, 죽이게	June 6, 2022	July 26, 2022	22:30
Poong, the Joseon Psychiatrist	조선 정신과 의사 유세풍	August 1, 2022	September 6, 2022	22:30
Mental Coach Jegal	멘탈코치 제갈길	September 12, 2022	November 1, 2022	22:30
Behind Every Star	연예인 매니저로 살아남기	November 7, 2022	December 13, 2022	22:30
Missing: The Other Side 2	미씽: 그들이 있었다 2	December 19, 2022	January 31, 2023	20:50
Our Blooming Youth	청춘월담	February 6, 2023	April 11, 2023	20:50
Family: The Unbreakable Bond	패밀리	April 17, 2023	May 23, 2023	20:50
Delightfully Deceitful	이로운 사기	May 29, 2023	July 18, 2023	20:50
My Lovely Liar	소용없어 거짓말	July 31, 2023	September 19, 2023	20:50
Twinkling Watermelon	반짝이는 워터멜론	September 25, 2023	November 14, 2023	20:50
Marry My Husband	내 남편과 결혼해줘	January 1, 2024	February 20, 2024	20:50
Wedding Impossible	웨딩 임파서블	February 26, 2024	April 2, 2024	20:50
Lovely Runner	선재 업고 튀어	April 8, 2024	May 28, 2024	20:50
The Player 2: Master of Swindlers	플레이어2: 꾼들의 전쟁	June 3, 2024	July 9, 2024	20:50
Serendipity's Embrace	우연일까?	July 22, 2024	August 13, 2024	20:50
No Gain No Love	손해 보기 싫어서	August 26, 2024	October 1, 2024	20:50
Parole Examiner Lee	가석방 심사관 이한신	November 18, 2024	December 24, 2024	20:50
The Queen Who Crowns	원경	January 6, 2025	February 11, 2025	20:50
My Dearest Nemesis	그놈은 흑염룡	February 17, 2025	March 25, 2025	20:50
The Divorce Insurance	이혼보험	March 31, 2025	May 6, 2025	20:50
Second Shot at Love	금주를 부탁해	May 12, 2025	June 17, 2025	20:50
Head over Heels	견우와 선녀	June 23, 2025	July 29, 2025	20:50
Love, Take Two	첫, 사랑을 위하여	August 4, 2025	September 9, 2025	20:50
Shin's Project	신사장 프로젝트	September 15, 2025	October 28, 2025	20:50
Nice to Not Meet You	얄미운 사랑	November 3, 2025	December 30, 2025	20:50
Spring Fever	스프링 피버	January 5, 2026	February 10, 2026	20:50
Siren's Kiss	세이렌	March 2, 2026	April 7, 2026	20:50
Yumi's Cells 3	유미의 세포들 3	April 13, 2026	May 5, 2026	20:50
The Legend of Kitchen Soldier	취사병 전설이 되다	May 11, 2026	June 16, 2026	20:50
See You at Work Tomorrow!	내일도 출근	June 22, 2026	July 28, 2026	20:50
My Bias, My Boss	최애의 사원	August 3, 2026	September 8, 2026	20:50
The Ordinary Jackpot	로또 1등도 출근합니다	September 14, 2026	October 13, 2026	21:00
Love in Disguise	나의 유죄인간	October 19, 2026		20:50

=== Monday to Thursday ===
List of Monday to Thursday dramas, showing the premiere date, finale date and timeslot
English title	Korean title	Premiere date	Finale date	Timeslot
Ice Adonis	노란 복수초	February 27, 2012	August 30, 2012	9:45
Glass Mask	유리가면	September 3, 2012	April 4, 2013	9:45
Crazy Love	미친사랑	April 8, 2013	July 19, 2013 (Note: Changed timeslot to Monday to Friday.)	9:45
Family Secret	가족의 비밀	October 27, 2014	April 30, 2015	9:45
A Bird That Doesn't Sing	울지않는 새	May 4, 2015	October 22, 2015	9:45

=== Monday to Friday ===
List of Monday to Friday dramas, showing the premiere date, finale date and timeslot
English title	Korean title	Premiere date	Finale date	Timeslot
Crazy Love	미친사랑	July 22, 2013	September 17, 2013	9:45

=== Tuesday ===
List of Tuesday dramas, showing the premiere date, finale date and timeslot
English title	Korean title	Premiere date	Finale date	Timeslot
Reply 1997	응답하라 1997	July 24, 2012	September 18, 2012	23:00

=== Wednesday ===
List of Wednesday dramas, showing the premiere date, finale date and timeslot
English title	Korean title	Premiere date	Finale date	Timeslot
The Blue Tower	푸른거탑	January 23, 2013	July 10, 2013	23:00
Fantasy Tower	환상거탑	July 17, 2013	September 4, 2013	23:00
The Blue Tower Zero	푸른거탑 제로	September 11, 2013	November 20, 2013	23:00
The Blue Tower Returns	푸른거탑 리턴즈	November 27, 2013	February 26, 2014	23:00
The Golden Tower	황금거탑	July 23, 2014	December 3, 2014	23:00

=== Wednesday and Thursday ===
List of Wednesday and Thursday dramas, showing the premiere date, finale date and timeslot
English title	Korean title	Premiere date	Finale date	Timeslot
Hyena	하이에나	October 11, 2006	November 30, 2006	23:00
Mermaid Story	인어 이야기	January 17, 2007	January 18, 2007	23:00
Romance Hunter	로맨스 헌터	February 7, 2007	May 23, 2007	23:00
The Great Catsby	위대한 캣츠비k	July 4, 2007	September 20, 2007	23:00
Manny	매니	April 13, 2011	June 2, 2011	21:00
12 Signs of Love	일년에 열두 남자	February 15, 2012	April 5, 2012	23:00
Queen and I	인현왕후의 남자	April 18, 2012	June 7, 2012	23:00
I Need Romance 2012	로맨스가 필요해 2012	June 20, 2012	August 9, 2012	23:00
The Third Hospital	제3병원	September 5, 2012	November 8, 2012	23:00
Criminal Minds	크리미널 마인드	July 26, 2017	September 28, 2017	23:00
Avengers Social Club	부암동 복수자들	October 11, 2017	November 16, 2017	21:30
Prison Playbook	슬기로운 감빵생활	November 22, 2017	January 18, 2018	21:10
Mother	마더	January 24, 2018	March 15, 2018	21:10
My Mister	나의 아저씨	March 21, 2018	May 17, 2018	21:10
What's Wrong with Secretary Kim	김비서가 왜 그럴까	June 6, 2018	July 26, 2018	21:30
Familiar Wife	아는 와이프	August 1, 2018	September 20, 2018	21:30
The Smile Has Left Your Eyes	하늘에서 내리는 일억개의 별	October 3, 2018	November 22, 2018	21:30
Encounter	남자친구	November 28, 2018	January 24, 2019	21:30
Touch Your Heart	진심이 닿다	February 6, 2019	March 28, 2019	21:30
Her Private Life	그녀의 사생활	April 10, 2019	May 30, 2019	21:30
Search: WWW	검색어를 입력하세요: WWW	June 5, 2019	July 25, 2019	21:30
When the Devil Calls Your Name	악마가 너의 이름을 부를 때	July 31, 2019	September 19, 2019	21:30
Miss Lee	청일전자 미쓰리	September 25, 2019	November 14, 2019	21:30
Psychopath Diary	싸이코패스 다이어	November 20, 2019	January 9, 2020	21:30
Money Game	머니게임	January 15, 2020	March 5, 2020	21:30
Memorist	'메모리스트	March 11, 2020	April 30, 2020	22:30
Oh My Baby	오 마이 베이비	May 13, 2020	July 2, 2020	22:30
Flower of Evil	악의꽃	July 29, 2020	September 23, 2020	22:30
Tale of the Nine Tailed	구미호뎐	October 7, 2020	December 3, 2020	22:30
True Beauty	여신강림	December 9, 2020	February 4, 2021	22:30
Mouse	마우스	March 3, 2021	May 20, 2021	22:30
My Roommate Is a Gumiho	간 떨어지는 동거	May 26, 2021	July 15, 2021	22:30
The Road: The Tragedy of One	더 로드: 1의 비극	August 4, 2021	September 9, 2021	22:30
Hometown	홈타운	September 22, 2021	October 28, 2021	22:30
Melancholia	멜랑꼴리아	November 10, 2021	December 30, 2021	22:30
The Witch's Diner	마녀식당으로 오세요	January 5, 2022	January 19, 2022	22:30
Work Later, Drink Now	술꾼도시여자들	February 3, 2022	February 18, 2022	22:30
Kill Heel	킬힐	March 9, 2022	April 21, 2022	22:30
The Killer's Shopping List	살인자의 쇼핑목록	April 27, 2022	May 19, 2022	22:30
Eve	이브	June 1, 2022	July 21, 2022	22:30
Adamas	아다마스	July 27, 2022	September 15, 2022	22:30
Love in Contract	월수금화목토	September 21, 2022	November 10, 2022	22:30
Poong, the Joseon Psychiatrist 2	조선 정신과 의사 유세풍 2	January 11, 2023	February 9, 2023	22:30
The Heavenly Idol	성스러운 아이돌	February 15, 2023	March 23, 2023	22:30
Stealer: The Treasure Keeper	스틸러: 일곱 개의 조선통보	April 12, 2023	May 18, 2023	22:30
Our Universe	우주를 줄게	February 4, 2026	March 12, 2026	22:40
Happy Anding	뜨거운 안녕	November 11, 2026		22:50

=== Thursday ===
List of Thursday dramas, showing the premiere date, finale date and timeslot
English title	Korean title	Premiere date	Finale date	Timeslot
She Is Wow	우와한 녀	April 18, 2013	July 4, 2013	23:00
Let's Eat	식샤를 합시다	November 28, 2013	March 13, 2014	23:00
The Idle Mermaid	잉여공주	August 7, 2014	October 9, 2014	23:00
Hospital Playlist	슬기로운 의사생활	March 12, 2020	May 28, 2020	21:00
Hospital Playlist 2	슬기로운 의사생활 2	June 17, 2021	September 16, 2021	21:00

=== Friday ===
List of Friday dramas, showing the premiere date, finale date and timeslot
English title	Korean title	Premiere date	Finale date	Timeslot
Fight	맞짱	October 24, 2008	December 12, 2008	23:00
Mrs. Town	미세스타운 남편이 죽었다	November 13, 2009	January 29, 2010	23:00
Golden House	위기일발 풍년빌라	March 5, 2010	May 7, 2010	23:00
Joseon X-Files	기찰비록	August 20, 2010	October 29, 2010	23:00
Once Upon a Time in Saengchori	원스 어폰 어 타임 인 생초리	November 5, 2010	March 18, 2011	23:00
Monstar	몬스타	May 17, 2013	August 2, 2013	23:00
Big Forest	빅 포레스트	September 7, 2018	November 9, 2018	23:00
Top Star U-back	톱스타 유백이	November 16, 2018	January 25, 2019	23:00
Ugly Miss Young-ae 17	막돼먹은 영애씨 17	February 8, 2019	April 26, 2019	23:00
Pegasus Market	쌉니다 천리마마트	September 20, 2019	December 6, 2019	23:00

=== Friday and Saturday ===
List of Friday and Saturday dramas, showing the premiere date, finale date and timeslot
English title	Korean title	Premiere date	Finale date	Timeslot
Reply 1994	응답하라 1994	October 18, 2013	December 28, 2013	20:30
Emergency Couple	응급남녀	January 24, 2014	April 5, 2014	20:30
Gap-dong	갑동이	April 11, 2014	June 21, 2014	20:30
Marriage, Not Dating	연애 말고 결혼	July 4, 2014	August 23, 2014	20:30
Plus Nine Boys	아홉수 소년	August 29, 2014	October 11, 2014	20:30
Misaeng: Incomplete Life	미생	October 17, 2014	December 20, 2014	20:30
Heart to Heart	하트 투 하트	January 9, 2015	March 7, 2015	20:30
Super Daddy Yeol	슈퍼대디 열	March 13, 2015	May 2, 2015	20:30
Ex-Girlfriends' Club	구여친 클럽	May 8, 2015	June 13, 2015	20:30
Oh My Ghost	오 나의 귀신님	July 3, 2015	August 22, 2015	20:30
Second 20s	두번째 스무살	August 28, 2015	October 17, 2015	20:30
Reply 1988	응답하라 1988	November 6, 2015	January 16, 2016	20:30
Signal	시그널	January 22, 2016	March 12, 2016	20:30
Memory	기억	March 18, 2016	May 7, 2016	20:30
Dear My Friends	디어 마이 프렌즈	May 13, 2016	July 2, 2016	20:30
The Good Wife	굿 와이프	July 8, 2016	August 27, 2016	20:30
Cinderella with Four Knights	신데렐라와 네 명의 기사	August 12, 2016	October 1, 2016	23:00
The K2	더 케이투	September 23, 2016	November 12, 2016	20:00
Entourage	안투라지	November 4, 2016	December 24, 2016	23:00
Guardian: The Lonely and Great God	도깨비	December 2, 2016	January 21, 2017	20:00
Tomorrow, with You	내일 그대와	February 3, 2017	March 25, 2017	20:00
Chicago Typewriter	시카고타자기	April 7, 2017	June 3, 2017	20:00
Dark Hole	다크홀	April 30, 2021	June 5, 2021	22:50
Voice 4	보이스 4	June 18, 2021	July 31, 2021	22:50
Yumi's Cells	유미의 세포들	September 17, 2021	October 30, 2021	22:50
Happiness	해피니스	November 5, 2021	December 11, 2021	22:40
Bad and Crazy	배드 앤 크레이지	December 17, 2021	January 28, 2022	22:40
Shooting Stars	별똥별	April 22, 2022	June 11, 2022	22:40
Blind	블라인드	September 16, 2022	November 5, 2022	22:40
Work Later, Drink Now 2	술꾼도시여자들 2	December 9, 2022	January 13, 2023	22:50

=== Saturday and Sunday ===
List of Saturday and Sunday dramas, showing the premiere date, finale date and timeslot
English title	Korean title	Premiere date	Finale date	Timeslot
Stranger	비밀의 숲	June 10, 2017	July 30, 2017	21:00
Live Up to Your Name	명불허전	August 12, 2017	October 1, 2017	21:00
Revolutionary Love	변혁의 사랑	October 14, 2017	December 3, 2017	21:00
The Most Beautiful Goodbye	세상에서 가장 아름다운 이별	December 9, 2017	December 17, 2017	21:00
A Korean Odyssey	화유기	December 23, 2017	March 4, 2018	21:00
Live	라이브	March 10, 2018	May 6, 2018	21:00
Lawless Lawyer	무법 변호사	May 12, 2018	July 1, 2018	21:00
Mr. Sunshine	미스터 션샤인	July 7, 2018	September 30, 2018	21:00
Room No. 9	나인룸	October 6, 2018	November 25, 2018	21:00
Memories of the Alhambra	알함브라 궁전의 추억	December 1, 2018	January 20, 2019	21:00
Romance Is a Bonus Book	로맨스는 별책부록	January 26, 2019	March 17, 2019	21:00
Confession	자백	March 23, 2019	May 12, 2019	21:00
Arthdal Chronicles Part 1–2	아스달 연대기	June 1, 2019	July 7, 2019	21:00
Hotel del Luna	호텔 델루나	July 13, 2019	September 1, 2019	21:00
Arthdal Chronicles Part 3	아스달 연대기	September 7, 2019	September 22, 2019	21:00
Melting Me Softly	날 녹여주오	September 28, 2019	November 17, 2019	21:00
Crash Landing on You	사랑의 불시착	December 14, 2019	February 16, 2020	21:00
Hi Bye, Mama!	하이바이, 마마!	February 22, 2020	April 19, 2020	21:00
When My Love Blooms	화양연화 – 삶이 꽃이 되는 순간	April 25, 2020	June 14, 2020	21:00
It's Okay to Not Be Okay	사이코지만 괜찮아	June 20, 2020	August 9, 2020	21:00
Stranger 2	비밀의 숲 2	August 15, 2020	October 4, 2020	21:00
Start-Up	스타트업	October 17, 2020	December 6, 2020	21:00
Mr. Queen	철인왕후	December 12, 2020	February 14, 2021	21:00
Vincenzo	빈센조	February 20, 2021	May 2, 2021	21:00
Mine	마인	May 8, 2021	June 27, 2021	21:00
The Devil Judge	악마판사	July 3, 2021	August 22, 2021	21:00
Hometown Cha-Cha-Cha	갯마을 차차차	August 28, 2021	October 17, 2021	21:00
Jirisan	지리산	October 23, 2021	December 12, 2021	21:00
Bulgasal: Immortal Souls	불가살	December 18, 2021	February 6, 2022	21:00
Twenty-Five Twenty-One	스물다섯 스물하나	February 12, 2022	April 3, 2022	21:10
Our Blues	우리들의 블루스	April 9, 2022	June 12, 2022	21:10
Alchemy of Souls Part 1	환혼	June 18, 2022	August 28, 2022	21:10
Little Women	작은 아씨들	September 3, 2022	October 9, 2022	21:10
Under the Queen's Umbrella	슈룹	October 15, 2022	December 4, 2022	21:10
Alchemy of Souls Part 2	환혼	December 10, 2022	January 8, 2023	21:10
Crash Course in Romance	일타 스캔들	January 14, 2023	March 5, 2023	21:10
Pandora: Beneath the Paradise	판도라: 조작된 낙원	March 11, 2023	April 30, 2023	21:10
Tale of the Nine Tailed 1938	구미호뎐 1938	May 6, 2023	June 11, 2023	21:20
See You in My 19th Life	이번 생도 잘 부탁해	June 17, 2023	July 23, 2023	21:20
The Uncanny Counter 2: Counter Punch	경이로운 소문2: 카운터 펀치	July 29, 2023	September 3, 2023	21:20
Arthdal Chronicles 2: The Sword of Aramoon	아라문의 검: 아스달 연대기	September 9, 2023	October 22, 2023	21:20
Castaway Diva	무인도의 디바	October 28, 2023	December 3, 2023	21:20
Maestra: Strings of Truth	마에스트라	December 9, 2023	January 14, 2024	21:20
Captivating the King	세작, 매혹된 자들	January 21, 2024	March 3, 2024	21:20
Queen of Tears	눈물의 여왕	March 9, 2024	April 28, 2024	21:20
The Midnight Romance in Hagwon	졸업	May 11, 2024	June 29, 2024	21:20
The Auditors	감사합니다	July 6, 2024	August 11, 2024	21:20
Love Next Door	엄마 친구 아들	August 17, 2024	October 6, 2024	21:20
Jeongnyeon: The Star Is Born	정년이	October 12, 2024	November 17, 2024	21:20
Love Your Enemy	사랑은 외나무다리에서	November 23, 2024	December 29, 2024	21:20
When the Stars Gossip	별들에게 물어봐	January 4, 2025	February 23, 2025	21:20
The Potato Lab	감자연구소	March 1, 2025	April 6, 2025	21:20
Resident Playbook	언젠가는 슬기로울 전공의생활	April 12, 2025	May 18, 2025	21:20
Our Unwritten Seoul	미지의 서울	May 24, 2025	June 29, 2025	21:20
Law and the City	서초동	July 5, 2025	August 10, 2025	21:20
Bon Appétit, Your Majesty	폭군의 셰프	August 23, 2025	September 28, 2025	21:20
Typhoon Family	태풍상사	October 11, 2025	November 30, 2025	21:20
Pro Bono	프로보노	December 6, 2025	January 11, 2026	21:20
Undercover Miss Hong	언더커버 미쓰홍	January 17, 2026	March 8, 2026	21:20
Mad Concrete Dreams	대한민국에서 건물주 되는 법	March 14, 2026	April 19, 2026	21:10
Filing for Love	은밀한 감사	April 25, 2026	May 31, 2026	21:10
Spooky in Love	오싹한 연애	July 18, 2026	August 23, 2026	21:10
Four Hands, Two Sonatas	포핸즈	August 29, 2026	October 4, 2026	21:10
100 Days of Deception	100일의 거짓말	October 10, 2026		21:10

=== Sunday ===
List of Sunday dramas, showing the premiere date, finale date and timeslot
English title	Korean title	Premiere date	Finale date	Timeslot
21st Century Family	21세기 가족	March 11, 2012	April 29, 2012	21:00
The Three Musketeers	삼총사	August 17, 2014	November 2, 2014	21:00
Great Stories	위대한 이야기	March 15, 2015	May 10, 2015	21:00

=== Upcoming ===
List of upcoming dramas, sorted alphabetically
English title	Korean title
Affair Hunter	불륜 헌터
Gift	기프트
My Ghostly Running Mate	의원님이 보우하사
The Second Signal	두 번째 시그널

== Sitcoms ==
=== Monday to Thursday ===
List of Monday to Thursday sitcoms, showing the premiere date, finale date and timeslot
English title	Korean title	Premiere date	Finale date	Timeslot
Potato Star 2013QR3	감자별 2013QR3	September 23, 2013	May 15, 2014	20:50

=== Thursday ===
List of Thursday sitcoms, showing the premiere date, finale date and timeslot
English title	Korean title	Premiere date	Finale date	Timeslot
Ugly Miss Young-ae season 11	막돼먹은 영애씨 11	November 29, 2012	March 28, 2013	23:00
Ugly Miss Young-ae season 12	막돼먹은 영애씨 12	July 18, 2013	November 14, 2013	23:00
Ugly Miss Young-ae season 13	막돼먹은 영애씨 13	March 27, 2014	July 10, 2014	23:00

=== Thursday and Friday ===
List of Thursday and Friday sitcoms, showing the premiere date, finale date and timeslot
English title	Korean title	Premiere date	Finale date	Timeslot
Ugly Miss Young-ae season 1	막돼먹은 영애씨	April 20, 2007	August 3, 2007	19:00

=== Friday ===
List of Friday sitcoms, showing the premiere date, finale date and timeslot
English title	Korean title	Premiere date	Finale date	Timeslot
Ugly Miss Young-ae season 2	막돼먹은 영애씨 2	September 7, 2007	December 21, 2007	22:00
Ugly Miss Young-ae season 3	막돼먹은 영애씨 3	March 7, 2008	June 20, 2008	22:00
Ugly Miss Young-ae season 4	막돼먹은 영애씨 4	September 5, 2008	December 19, 2008	22:00
Ugly Miss Young-ae season 5	막돼먹은 영애씨 5	March 6, 2009	July 17, 2009	22:00
Ugly Miss Young-ae season 6	막돼먹은 영애씨 6	October 16, 2009	February 26, 2010	22:00
Ugly Miss Young-ae season 7	막돼먹은 영애씨 7	May 14, 2010	September 24, 2010	22:00
Ugly Miss Young-ae season 8	막돼먹은 영애씨 8	December 12, 2010	April 29, 2011	22:00
Ugly Miss Young-ae season 9	막돼먹은 영애씨 9	September 9, 2011	January 20, 2012	22:00
Ugly Miss Young-ae season 10	막돼먹은 영애씨 10	April 13, 2012	August 31, 2012	22:00
Flower Grandpa Investigation Unit	꽃할배 수사대	May 9, 2014	July 25, 2014	22:00
The Superman Age	초인시대	2015	2015	23:30

=== Saturday ===
List of Saturday sitcoms, showing the premiere date, finale date and timeslot
English title	Korean title	Premiere date	Finale date	Timeslot
Play Guide	플레이가이드	2013	2013	1:20

=== Sunday ===
List of Sunday sitcoms, showing the premiere date, finale date and timeslot
English title	Korean title	Premiere date	Finale date	Timeslot
Roller Coaster Plus Date Big Bang	롤러코스터 플러스 연애빅뱅	2010	2010	24:00

== Variety shows ==
List of variety shows, showing the premiere date and finale date
English title	Korean title	Premiere date	Finale date
Roller Coaster	롤러코스터	2009	2013
Martian Virus	화성인 바이러스	2009	2013
Korea's Got Talent	코리아 갓 탤런트	June 4, 2011	July 27, 2012
Comedy Big League	코미디빅리그	September 17, 2011	—N/a
Saturday Night Live Korea	새터데이 나이트 라이브 코리아	December 3, 2011	November 18, 2017
The Romantic & Idol	더로맨틱&아이돌	2012	2013
Super Diva	슈퍼 디바	2012	2012
WIN: Who Is Next	—N/a	2013	2013
The Genius	더 지니어스	April 26, 2013	September 12, 2015
Grandpas Over Flowers	꽃보다 할배	July 5, 2013	August 24, 2018
Sisters Over Flowers	꽃보다 누나	November 29, 2013	January 17, 2013
Youth Over Flowers	꽃보다 청춘	August 1, 2014	January 9, 2018
First Day of Work	오늘부터 출근	2014	2014
Three Meals a Day	삼시세끼	October 17, 2014	July 10, 2020
WE KID	위키드	2016	2016
Boys24	소년24	2016	2016
New Journey to the West	신서유기	April 8, 2016	December 18, 2020
Babel 250	바벨 250	July 11, 2016	September 27, 2016
Hit the Stage	힛 더 스테이지	July 27, 2016	September 28, 2016
Society Game	소사이어티게임	October 16, 2016	January 1, 2017
Buzzer Beater	버저비터	2017	2017
Salty Tour	짠내투어	January 25, 2017	August 4, 2020
Youn's Kitchen	윤식당	March 24, 2017	March 23, 2018
Island Trio	섬총사	May 22, 2017	September 10, 2018
Where Is Mr. Kim	김무명을 찾아라	October 7, 2017	April 12, 2018
Seoul Mate	서울메이트	November 17, 2017	September 16, 2019
Kang's Kitchen	신서유기 외전 강식당	December 5, 2017	August 2, 2019
Little Cabin in the Woods	숲속의 작은 집	2018	2018
4 Wheeled Restaurant	현지에서 먹힐까	March 27, 2018	May 19, 2020
DoReMi Market	도레미 마켓	April 7, 2018	—N/a
Street Food Fighter	스트리트 푸드 파이터	April 23, 2018	November 24, 2019
Food Diary	식량일기	May 30, 2018	August 8, 2018
Great Escape	대탈출	July 1, 2018	October 3, 2021
Friendly Driver	친절한 기사단	August 24, 2018	April 18, 2018
You Quiz on the Block	유 퀴즈 온 더 블럭	August 29, 2018	—N/a
Sun Cafe	선다방	2018	2018
Galileo: The Space Awakens	갈릴레오: 깨어난 우주	2018	2018
Mother's Touch: Korean Side Dishes	수미네 반찬	2018	2020
Weekend Playlist	주말 사용 설명서	November 30, 2018	January 27, 2019
Coffee Friends	커피 프렌즈	January 4, 2019	March 8, 2019
Korean Hostel in Spain	스페인 하숙	March 15, 2019	May 24, 2019
Prison Life of Fools	호구들의 감빵생활	March 16, 2019	September 7, 2019
Show! Audio Jockey	쇼! 오디오자키	March 17, 2019	June 30, 2019
Super Hearer	슈퍼히어러	June 16, 2019	August 4, 2019
Player 7	플레이어	July 14, 2019	March 21, 2020
The Ranksters	뭐든지 프렌즈	July 17, 2019	September 4, 2019
Laborhood on Hire	일로 만난 사이	August 24, 2019	October 26, 2019
V-1	—N/a	September 13, 2019	September 15, 2019
Trans-Siberian Pathfinders	시베리아 선발대	September 26, 2019	November 21, 2019
Wednesday Music Playlist	—N/a	October 2, 2019	December 4, 2019
Kpop Cultural Center	케이팝 어학당-노랫말싸미	2020	2020
Decoding Meow	냐옹은 페이크다	2020	2020
Run	—N/a	January 2, 2020	January 23, 2020
On & Off	온앤오프	May 2, 2020	May 25, 2021
The House Detox	신박한 정리	June 29, 2020	July 5, 2021
Hometown Flex	서울촌놈	July 12, 2020	September 20, 2020
Sixth Sense	식스센스	September 3, 2020	June 17, 2022
Youn's Stay	윤스테이	January 8, 2021	April 2, 2021
Unexpected Business	어쩌다 사장	February 25, 2021	February 1, 2024
The Game Caterers	출장 십오야	March 21, 2021	March 4, 2022
Honeymoon Tavern	우도 주막	July 12, 2021	September 6, 2021
We Don't Bite: Villains in the Countryside	해치지 않아	September 28, 2021	December 7, 2021
All Table Tennis!	올 탁구나	2022	2022
City Girls on the Climb	산꾼도시여자들	2022	2022
Earth Arcade	뿅뿅 지구오락실	2022	2023
Europe Outside the Tent	텐트 밖은 유럽	2022	2022
The Backpacker Chef	백패커	May 26, 2022	October 6, 2022
Unexpected Yuh-jung	뜻밖의 여정	2022	2022
Once in a Lifetime, Climbing Kilimanjaro	인생에 한 번쯤, 킬리만자로	2022	2022
Jinny's Kitchen	서진이네	February 24, 2023	—N/a
Follow Hyung to Maya	형따라 마야로: 아홉 개의 열쇠	2023	2023
Jinny's Kitchen: Team Building	출장소통의신 - 서진이네편	2023	2023
GBRB: Reap What You Sow	콩 심은 데 콩 나고 팥 심은 데 팥 난다 (콩콩팥팥)	2023	2023
Genius Paik 2	장사천재 백사장	October 29, 2023	February 4, 2024
Apartment 404	아파트404	February 23, 2024	April 12, 2024
Watcha Up To	밥이나 한잔해	May 16, 2024	July 11, 2024
The Backpacker Chef 2	백패커	May 26, 2024	November 11, 2024
Iron Girls	무쇠소녀단	September 7, 2024	September 26, 2025
Muscle Farmers	헬스파머	December 21, 2025	February 15, 2026
The Village Barber	보검매직컬	January 30, 2026	—N/a
Curtain Up, Class!	방과후 태리쌤	February 22, 2026	April 26, 2026

== Talk shows ==
List of talk shows, showing the premiere date and finale date
English title	Korean title	Premiere date	Finale date
Live Talk Show Taxi	현장 토크쇼 택시	September 8, 2007	November 1, 2017
Baek Ji-yeon's People Inside	백지연의 끝장토론	2010	2013
Little Big Hero	리틀빅 히어로	2012	2012
Coolkkadang	쿨까당	2012	2012
Kim Mi-kyung Show	김미경 쇼	2013	2013
Problematic Men	문제적남자	February 26, 2015	February 13, 2020
Life Bar	인생술집	December 8, 2016	April 11, 2019
The Dictionary of Useless Knowledge	알아두면 쓸데없는 신비한 잡학사전	2017	2017
