= Lee Ju-myoung =

South Korean actress (born 1993)

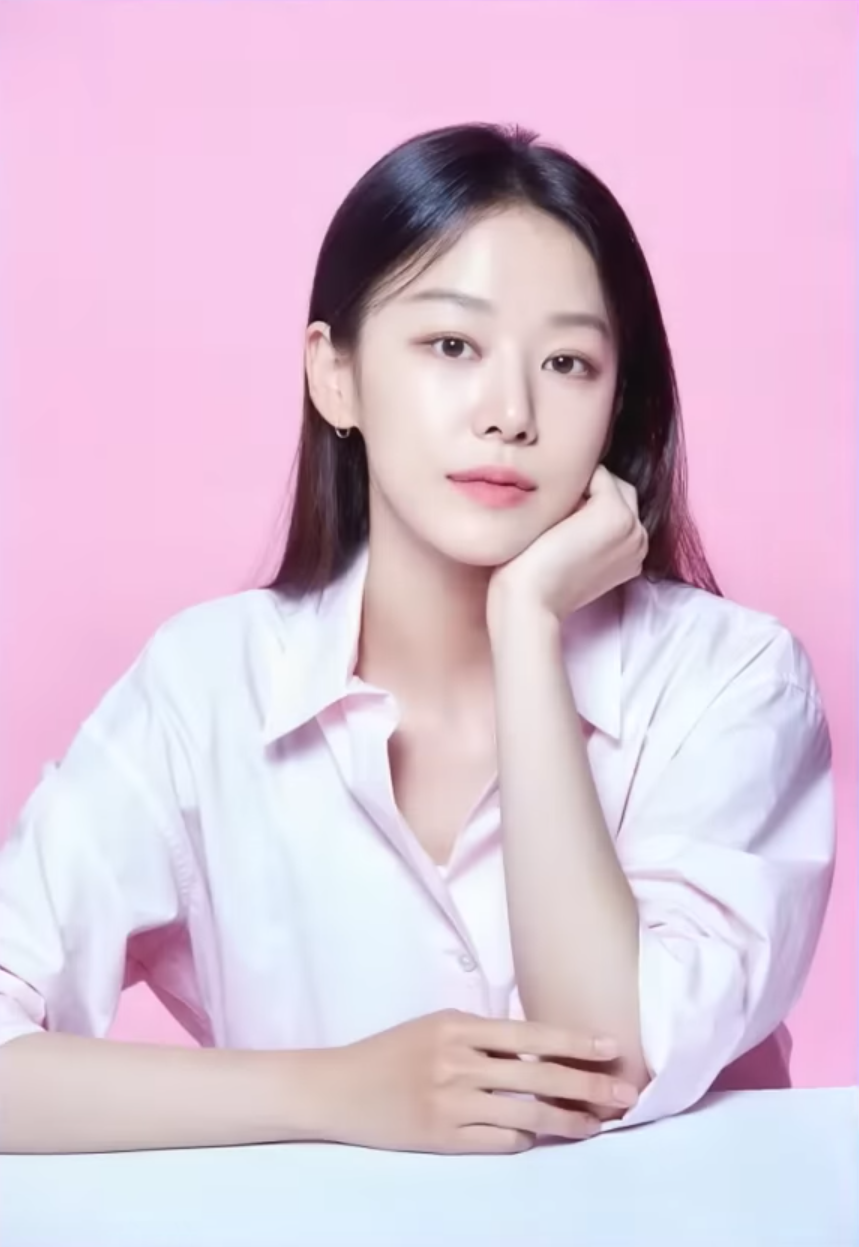
- Lee in August 2022
- Born: December 1, 1993 (age 32); Busan, South Korea
- Occupations: Actress; model
- Years active: 2016–present
- Agent: Alien Company

Korean name
- Hangul: 이주명
- Hanja: 李柱明
- RR: I Jumyeong
- MR: I Chumyŏng

Lee Ju-myoung (Korean: 이주명; born December 1, 1993) is a South Korean actress and model. She debuted in the television and film industry with My Fellow Citizens! (2019) and is best known for her roles in Kairos (2020), Twenty-Five Twenty-One (2022) and Like Flowers in Sand (2023–2024).

== Life and career ==
In 2016, Lee began her career as a model through the opportunity of shooting photos with her friend, who was a photographer, which opened a chance to appear in a lookbook. It led to her first acting role in the music video entitled "Don't Leave" (Korean: 떠나지마) by Yang Da-il. This prompted her desire to further act with dialogues, and so, debuted as an actress with the KBS2 television series My Fellow Citizens! (2019).

== Other ventures ==
=== Endorsements ===
In October 2020, Lee was selected as an endorsement model for South Korean make-up brand, Hince. A representative from the brand stated: "We believe the sensuous and sophisticated atmosphere of Lee Ju-myoung fits the image of the brand well. We look forward to the future activities."

In September 2022, the global fashion brand Mango Tail selected Lee as the first Korean model. A brand official said, "Actress Lee Ju-myoung unique and fashionable charm and dignified attitude matched the image pursued by the brand, so I was selected as the first Korean model. I look forward to it."

== Personal life ==
In August 2024, it was confirmed that Lee was in a relationship with actor Kim Ji-seok.

== Filmography ==
Key
†	Denotes films that have not yet been released

=== Film ===
Year	Title	Role	Ref.
2024	Pilot	Yoon Seul-gi	

=== Television series ===
Year	Title	Role	Notes	Ref.
2019	My Fellow Citizens!	Hwang Seung-yi		
2020	Hospital Playlist	Song PD	Cameo (Episode 1)	
2020	Missing: The Other Side	Jang-mi	Season 1	
2020	Kairos	Park Soo-jung		
2021	Check Out the Event	Jang Ru-ri		
2022	Twenty-Five Twenty-One	Ji Seung-wan		
2023	Family: The Unbreakable Bond	Shadow	Cameo (Episode 7)	
2023–2024	Like Flowers in Sand	Oh Yoo-kyung		
2025	My Youth	Mo Tae-rin		
2026	Reborn Rookie	Kang Bang-geul		

=== Radio shows ===
Year	Title	Role	Notes	Ref.
2022	Turn up the volume	Special DJ	August 16	

=== Music video appearances ===
Year	Title	Artist	Ref.
2016	"Don't Leave" (떠나지마)	Yang Da-il	
2016	"Who's Got You Singing Again"	PREP	
2017	"Second Date"	Sugarbowl	
2017	"Hold Me Down"	Dumbfoundead	
2017	"Summer Go Loco"	Loco (featuring Gray)	
2017	"Snow" (눈)	Zion.T (featuring Lee Moon-se)	
2018	"Don't Leave" (떠나지마요)	Block B	
2018	"Crazy" (미쳤나봐)	Martin Smith (featuring Jung Sun-ha)	
2021	"Tang!♡" (탕!♡)	Mino	

== Discography ==
=== Soundtrack appearances ===
List of soundtrack appearances with selected chart position, showing year released and album name
Title	Year	Peak chart positions		Album
Title	Year	KOR		Album
Title	Year	Gaon	Hot	Album
"With" (with Choi Hyun-wook, Bona, Kim Tae-ri, and Nam Joo-hyuk)	2022	40	54	Twenty-Five Twenty-One OST

== Awards and nominations ==
Name of the award ceremony, year presented, award category, nominee(s) of the award, and the result of the nomination
Award ceremony	Year	Category	Nominee(s) / work(s)	Result	Ref.
Blue Dragon Film Awards	2024	Best New Actress	Pilot	Nominated	
Korea Culture and Entertainment Awards	2024	Excellence Award, Actress in a Film	Pilot	Won	
Korea First Brand Awards	2025	Promising Actress (Film) to Lead in 2025	Lee Ju-myoung	Nominated	
MBC Drama Awards	2020	Best New Actress	Kairos	Nominated	
Seoul Global Movie Awards	2024	Best New Actress	Pilot	Won	
Women in Film Korea Festival	2024	Best New Actor	Pilot	Won	
