= Dead-End Job =

2026 South Korean television series

- Promotional poster
- Hangul: 꿀알바
- Lit.: Honey Part-Time Job
- RR: Kkuralba
- MR: Kkuralba
- Genre: Mystery; Horror; Fantasy
- Created by: Han Jun-hee
- Based on: Operating Principles of a Convenience Store by Kyung Min-sun
- Written by: Kyung Min-sun; Lee Shin-ji
- Directed by: Kim Da-min
- Starring: Lee Jae-wook; Go Min-si; Kim Min-ha; Lee Hee-joon
- Music by: Chae Min-joo
- Country of origin: South Korea
- Original language: Korean
- No. of episodes: 8

Production
- Executive producers: Kim Myung-jin; Yoon Hyun-ki
- Producer: Yeom Eun-ha
- Cinematography: Lee Jae-woo
- Editor: Park Min-sun
- Running time: 33–44 minutes
- Production company: Shotcake

Original release
- Network: Netflix
- Release: October 30, 2026

Dead-End Job (Korean: 꿀알바; lit. 'Honey Part-Time Job') is a 2026 South Korean mystery horror fantasy television series written by Kyeong Min-sun and Lee Shin-ji, directed by Kim Da-min, and starring Lee Jae-wook, Go Min-si, Kim Min-ha, and Lee Hee-joon. The first four episodes of the series premiered at the 31st Busan International Film Festival in the 'On Screen' section on October 7, 2026. It was released globally on Netflix on October 30.

== Synopsis ==
Hyuk‑jun, a man in his thirties, stumbles upon a mysterious job agency that promises "perfect" part-time work paying nearly 50 times the normal wage. Desperate to climb out of his growing debt, he signs up for this unbelievably high-paying but secretive job. What begins as a hopeful escape quickly turns into a nightmare, pulling him into a terrifying, hellish workplace with horrors he never imagined.

== Cast and characters ==
=== Main ===
- Lee Jae-wook as Byeon Hyuk-jun
  - Han Ji-an as young Hyuk-jun

A young man who takes on what appears to be the perfect part-time job, offering 50 times the usual hourly wage through a mysterious employment agency called the Spyder Human Resource Center.

- Go Min-si as Eum Yeon-joo

An investigator determined to uncover the truth behind the unsettling events at Spyder Human Resource Center.

- Kim Min-ha as Byeon Ji-yoon
  - Park Yu-ha as young Ji-yoon

Hyuk-jun's spirited younger sister.

- Lee Hee-joon as Mr. S

The boss of Spyder Human Resource Center.

=== Supporting ===
- Baek Hyun-Jin as Byeon Min-su

Hyuk-jun and Ji-yoon's father who went missing.

- Lee Suk-hyeong as Kwak Byeong-cheol

Hyuk-jun's friend.

=== Special appearances ===
- Choi Hyun-wook as Choi Hee-dong (Ep. 1)
- Yoon Kyung-ho as Cho Jun-seop (Ep. 2)
- Cho Hyun-chul as Cinephile (Ep. 4)
- Yoon Byung-hee as Midnight Fantasy Cinema Manager (Ep. 4)
- Ko Chang-seok as Construction Site Foreman (Ep. 6)
- Park Kyung-hye as Parade Manager at the amusement park Neo World (Ep. 7, 8)
- Kim Si-eun as Woman on Han River bridge (Ep. 8)

== Episodes ==
No.	Title	Original release date
1	"Convenience Store Rules"; Transliteration: "Pyeonuijeom unyeongwonchik" (Korean: 편의점 운영원칙)	October 30, 2026
After attempting suicide from a bridge, Byeon Hyuk-jun discovers an ad for Spider Staffing Agency and responds to it, meeting boss Mr. S. He is assigned to a night job at a convenience store, where he finds a set of rules for him. During the night, strange events happen, like butterflies covering all the windows and noises in the storage room. After meeting the other part-timer, Hyuk-jun enters the storage room, where he finds a human-like creature in a vat. He also re-reads the rules and realizes his co-worker is not human. He tries to fight his co-worker, who reveals he wrote the "rules" before transforming into a monstrous rat. The two fight until the sun rises, burning the creature. Hyuk-jun leaves, and a woman finds his wallet at a bus stop.
2	"A Journey with a Pierrot"; Transliteration: "Ppierowaui donghaeng" (Korean: 삐에로와의 동행)	October 30, 2026
Hyuk-jun accepts a job as a driver for an entertainer to an event at a hospital. The woman, Eum Yeon-joo, asks him about the job, but due to the agency's rules, Hyuk-jun declines to speak to her. At an office, Hyuk-jun meets Pierrot, the mime, and the event planner. During the journey, the mime unsettles the other two with his behavior, making objects disappear and turning a rabbit into confetti. After they stop at a rest stop, the event planner gets a phone call and learns the mime is not the actual performer hired for the event. He confronts Pierrot, who tricks the planner into entering his sack before shrinking it and strangling him to death. Pierrot spares Hyuk-jun after he draws a joker card, and Hyuk-jun drives him to the hospital. He introduces Pierrot, who turns into a monstrous clown and massacres the event attendees while letting Hyuk-jun leave.
3	"Milkman Vlog"; Transliteration: "Uyubaedal beuirog" (Korean: 우유배달 브이로그)	October 30, 2026
Following the hospital massacre, Hyuk-jun quits the agency and gets a job at a warehouse, meeting an old friend Kwak Byeong-cheol. Kwak is injured at work and the company denies his worker's comp claim, so Hyuk-jun returns to Spider Staffing Agency and accepts a milkman job. The building's doorman tells him he must complete the job in an hour, confiscates the weapons he brought, and tells him not to make mistakes. Hyuk-jun tries to film himself, but his footage is corrupted. On the fourth floor, he mistakenly puts the bottles in front of the wrong room, causing his time to quickly decrease. The elevator door starts slamming open and shut, forcing Hyuk-jun to flee to a stairwell, where he is pursued by a black fog. This takes him to the fifth floor, which rotates, forcing him to climb, but he drops the last bottle, breaking it and reducing his time to zero. He enters the last room to escape the fog, finding a white void with many doors. After looking through a peephole, an unseen force drags Hyuk-jun away as Mr. S crosses his name off on a list.
4	"Midnight Fantasy Cinema"; Transliteration: "Simya hwansanggeukjang" (Korean: 심야 환상극장)	October 30, 2026
In 2014, Hyuk-jun's sister Ji-yoon runs in the wrong direction at a track meet and breaks her ankle trying to turn around. In the present day, she gets a text from Hyuk-jun about Spider and meets Mr. S, who claims to know nothing of his disappearance. Yeon-jo meets Ji-yoon and tells her she believes her brother is in "the other world". Ji-yoon dismisses her claims, but later contacts Spider and accepts a night job at a movie theater. While cleaning a theater, Ji-yoon encounters a silent man who collapses into a pile of clothes and a customer who quizzes her on movies; her boss mentions supernatural rumors about both. Using Yeon-jo's advice, Ji-yoon determines the door to the other world is in Theater 7, which has one customer despite no movie being played. When Ji-yoon confronts her, the customer disappears and the projector plays footage of the track meet. Ji-yoon heads to the projection room and accidentally shoves her boss against a light switch, exposing bloodstains around the room. The silent man appears again, revealing himself as a many-eyed creature before Ji-yoon sets him on fire. Ji-yoon finds an entrance under the screen and is pulled into it just as Hyuk-jun wakes up in a ditch.
5	"Clinical Trial"; Transliteration: "Imsangsiheom" (Korean: 임상시험)	October 30, 2026
Hyuk-jun returns to Seoul, but Ji-yoon does not respond to his texts and Mr. S is not in office, though he says Ji-yoon is safe. With Yeon-joo's help, Hyuk-jun replaces another part-timer at a bio clinic. Meanwhile, Ji-yoon wakes up in the white void and breaks through a door into the same clinic. Hyuk-jun and 15 other participants, including Byeong-cheol, are told to take a stress-relief pill and wait an hour. Ji-yoon knocks out a researcher and takes his hazmat suit, but other researchers catch her. Byeong-cheol fakes a stomachache so Hyuk-jun can sneak out, but the doctors catch him and put both siblings in a lab. Upon waking up, a worm-like creature appears from Hyuk-jun's nose; it quickly grows and kills several scientists as Hyuk-jun realizes it was in the water they drank. Hyuk-jun finds Byeong-cheol while Ji-yoon sees the worms forming a pillar. In the lobby, the clinic director says the creatures suck life force from humans and she lets the trio leave, but Byeong-cheol returns anyway. In a flashback, Hyuk-jun's father Min-su tells him they will move into a nice house once he finishes a job, which Hyuk-jun remembers was right before he disappeared.
6	"The Walls Don't Talk"; Transliteration: "Malhaji anneun geonmul" (Korean: 말하지 않는 건물)	October 30, 2026
Mr. S suggests someone has been helping Hyuk-jun and claims not to know Min-su before offering Hyuk-jun a job at a construction site. The siblings visit their mother and Hyuk-jun finds a journal suggesting his father was a part-timer. As the crew removes support pipes, another crew arrives and says they installed those pipes yesterday, sparking a brawl. As they leave, one of the second crew's workers warns Hyuk-jun not to trust the foreman. The crew is removing a banner when another worker falls to the ground, but the gate manager turns an ambulance away. The rest of the crew, sans Hyuk-jun and the foreman, leave to get him care. At night, the foreman mentions a previous employee matching Min-su's description. The foreman takes Hyuk-jun to the basement, where he finds a pillar of dead and dying workers, which the foreman says are sacrifices to the building. After a fight, the foreman tells Hyuk-jun that Min-su went through a door and never returned.
7	"Neo World After Dark"; Transliteration: "Neowoldeu yagangaejang" (Korean: 네오월드 야간개장)	October 30, 2026
At Spider, Hyuk-jun gets his payment as Ji-yoon tells him not to accept any more jobs. Yeon-jo tells Hyuk-jun that 40 years ago, she hid in a locker during a protest at the Kyungil textile factory. When she emerged, 40 years had passed and the site was now an amusement park. At Hyuk-jun's request, Mr. S gives him a job at the amusement park and says he may find answers if he becomes a full-time employee. At the park, a woman has Hyuk-jun don a Big Bad Wolf costume with other mascots in a parade. When the music changes, the other mascots start killing each other. Ji-yoon confronts Mr. S, who tells her that Yeon-jo is actually a monster from the other side before entering the void with Ji-yoon. Hyuk-jun finds that the mascot suits meld with their wearers, but he successfully removes his wolf costume. When the parade marshal notices Hyuk-jun, she orders the remaining mascots to kill him. He flees into a haunted house and stumbles onto the set of the game show his father failed at when Hyuk-jun was a child.
8	"Last Carnival"; Transliteration: "Majimak kanibal" (Korean: 마지막 카니발)	October 30, 2026
On the game show, Hyuk-jun sees hallucinations of his father and all the people who died during his jobs. After escaping, he is chased by a shapeshifting creature out of the haunted house, finding all the mascots dead and the storage closet Yeon-jo said she hid in. Yeon-jo appears just as Mr. S and Ji-yoon arrive through the void door; Mr. S kills three mascots and knocks Ji-yoon out while Yeon-jo kills the attacking parade marshal. Mr. S warns that opening the door will release all the creatures inside and shoots Yeon-jo several times with his shotgun, telling Hyuk-jun they need sacrifices to save the world, but Hyuk-jun opens the door anyways. Yeon-jo, still alive, grabs Mr. S and lets the shadows in the door take him. She apologizes for deceiving Hyuk-jun and says the world needs to see how rotten it is, before the shadows envelop both of them. Hyuk-jun wakes up in a room with Min-su, who gives him money to bring back home and tells him to leave. Ji-yoon drags Hyuk-jun from the door before they shove it closed and flee, the park catching fire. Some time later, Hyuk-jun saves a suicidal woman and get a text from an unknown number. He sees a news story about similar fires to the amusement park and heads to one site, where he is told that Mr. S recommended him to be the new manager of Spider Staffing Agency. Ji-yoon gets a text offering a position at Kyungil Group.

== Production ==
In April 2025, Netflix announced the development of the mystery horror fantasy series under the working title Perfect Job directed by Kim Da-min, and written by Kyeong Min-sun and Lee Shin-ji.

With the announcement of the project, the principal cast was revealed, with Lee Jae-wook, Go Min-si, Kim Min-ha, and Lee Hee-joon set to portray the main roles. On August 30, 2025, it was reported that Choi Hyun-wook and Yoon Kyung-ho have joined the cast of the series. In November 2025, it was revealed that Ko Chang-seok would make special appearance in the series.

== Release ==
Dead-End Job was invited as one of three drama series in the 'On Screen' section of the 31st Busan International Film Festival, where four of eight episodes were screened on October 7, 2026. The series was released globally on Netflix on October 30, 2026.
