= Bona (singer) =

South Korean singer and actress (born 1995)

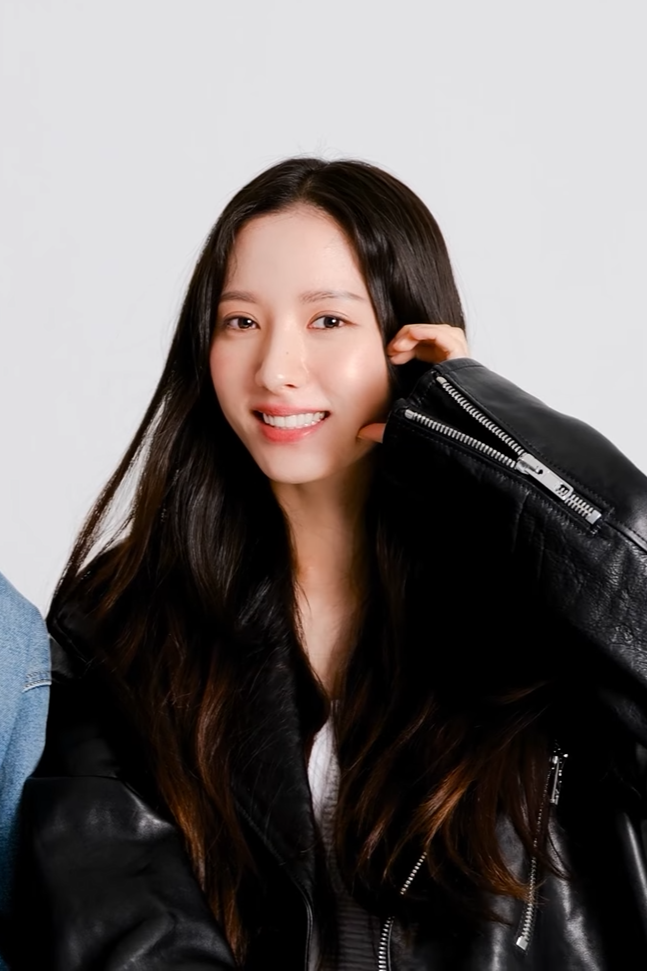
- Bona in March 2023
- Born: Kim Ji-yeon; August 19, 1995 (age 31); Daegu, South Korea
- Occupations: Singer; actress
- Years active: 2016–present
- Awards: Full list
- Musical career
- Genre: K-pop
- Instrument: Vocals
- Label: Starship
- Member of: WJSN; Starship Planet

Korean name
- Hangul: 김지연
- Hanja: 金知姸
- RR: Gim Jiyeon
- MR: Kim Chiyŏn

Stage name
- Hangul: 보나
- RR: Bona
- MR: Pona
- Website: starship-ent.com

Kim Ji-yeon (Korean: 김지연; born August 19, 1995), known professionally as Bona (Korean: 보나), is a South Korean singer and actress. She is a member of the South Korean girl group WJSN, and also its sub-unit WJSN The Black. She made her acting debut in the KBS2 drama Hit the Top (2017), and was cast as the female lead in the teen drama Girls' Generation 1979 (2018).

Bona gained recognition for her portrayal as world champion and gold medalist fencer Ko Yu-rim in the tvN television series Twenty-Five Twenty-One (2022). Credited under her full name, she later starred in the television series Joseon Attorney (2023) and Pyramid Game (2024).

== Early life and education ==
Bona was born on August 19, 1995, in Dalseo District, Daegu, South Korea and attended high school in the same city. Bona was a trainee under Cube Entertainment before joining Starship Entertainment in 2013.

== Career ==
=== 2015–2020: Music career debut with WJSN as Bona and acting debut ===
She was revealed to be a member of WJSN and its Wonder Unit on December 15, 2015, and proceeded to debut with them on February 25, 2016, with their debut mini-album Would You Like? and the single "MoMoMo".

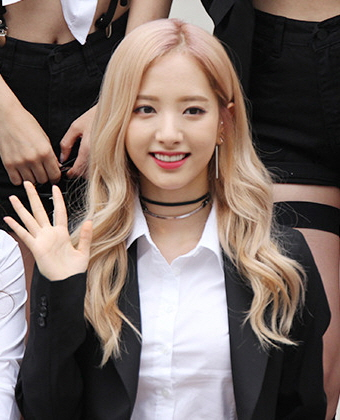
Bona in August 2016

In 2017, she made her acting debut in the KBS2 drama Hit the Top, and was cast as the female lead in the teen drama Girls' Generation 1979. She made a cameo in Radio Romance in 2018, before her second lead role in Your House Helper. Bona was revealed to have joined the cast of Law of the Jungle in Northern Mariana Islands.

In 2020, Bona joined the KBS2 drama Homemade Love Story, playing as Lee Hae-deun. She earned the Best New Actress at the 2020 KBS Drama Awards for her acting in the series.

=== 2022–present: Rise in popularity and credited in full name ===
In 2022, Bona rose to prominence for her role as a world champion and gold medalist fencer alongside Kim Tae-ri and Nam Joo-hyuk in the tvN drama Twenty-Five Twenty-One. The drama became one of the highest-rated Korean dramas in cable television history.

After scheduling conflicts with the filming of Twenty-Five Twenty-One, Bona joined WJSN in the third round of Mnet's competition show Queendom, which the group ultimately won in June 2022.

==== Credited as Kim Ji-yeon ====
In March 2023, Kim starred in the historical legal revenge drama Joseon Attorney (2023) as a princess during the Joseon period.

In February 2024, Kim under her full name starred in the series Pyramid Game (2024) as Sung Soo-ji of Class 5 at Baekyeon Girls' High School, who was bullied in the school under the pretext of a game.

== Discography ==
=== Soundtrack appearances ===
List of soundtrack appearances with selected chart position, showing year released and album name
Title	Year	Peak chart position		Album
Title	Year	KOR		Album
Title	Year	Gaon	Hot	Album
"With" (with Choi Hyun-wook, Kim Tae-ri, Lee Joo-myung, and Nam Joo-hyuk)	2022	40	54	Twenty-Five Twenty-One OST

== Filmography ==
=== Television series ===
Year	Title	Role	Notes	Ref.
2017	Hit the Top	Do Hye-ri		
2017	Girls' Generation 1979	Lee Jung-hee		
2018	Radio Romance	DJ Jay	Cameo (Episode 3)	
2018	Your House Helper	Im Da-young		
2020–2021	Homemade Love Story	Lee Hae-deun		
2022	Twenty-Five Twenty-One	Ko Yu-rim		
2023	Joseon Attorney	Lee Yeon-joo		
2024	Pyramid Game	Sung Su-ji		
2025	The Haunted Palace	Yeo-ri		
2026	Dive into You	Yoon Ha-na		

=== Television shows ===
Year	Title	Role	Ref.
2018	Law of the Jungle in Northern Mariana Islands	Cast member	

== Accolades ==
=== Awards and nominations ===
Name of the award ceremony, year presented, category, nominee of the award, and the result of the nomination
Award ceremony	Year	Category	Nominee / Work	Result	Ref.
Asia Artist Awards	2022	Popularity Award – Actor	Bona	Nominated	
Asia Artist Awards	2022	Best Acting Performance	Twenty-Five Twenty-One	Won	
Brand of the Year Awards	2021	Acting Idol of the Year (Female)	Bona	Won	
KBS Drama Awards	2017	Best New Actress	Hit the Top, Girls' Generation 1979	Nominated	
KBS Drama Awards	2017	Best Actress in a One-Act/Special/Short Drama	Girls' Generation 1979	Nominated	
KBS Drama Awards	2018	Best Couple Award	Bona (with Ha Seok-jin); Your House Helper	Nominated	
KBS Drama Awards	2020	Best New Actress	Homemade Love Story	Won	
Korea Culture and Entertainment Awards	2022	Excellence Award, Actress	Twenty-Five Twenty-One	Won	
Korea Drama Awards	2022	Best New Actress	Twenty-Five Twenty-One	Won	
Korea First Brand Awards	2019	Female Idol-Actor Award	Bona	Won	
Korea First Brand Awards	2020	Best Idol Actress	Homemade Love Story	Won	
MBC Drama Awards	2023	Excellence Award, Actress in a Miniseries	Joseon Attorney	Nominated	
MBC Drama Awards	2023	Best Couple Award	Bona (with Woo Do-hwan); Joseon Attorney	Nominated	
SBS Drama Awards	2025	Top Excellence Award, Actress in a Miniseries Humanity/Fantasy Drama	The Haunted Palace	Won	

=== Honors ===
Name of country or organization, year given, and name of honor or award
Country or Organization	Year	Honor or Award	Ref.
Newsis K-Expo Cultural Awards (Note: Established in 2019 and co-sponsored by Korea's Ministry of Culture, Sports and Tourism, Ministry of Foreign Affairs, Korea Creative Content Agency, Seoul Metropolitan Council and the Seoul Tourism Organization, it awards cultural icons, businesses, and individuals who have contributed greatly to Hallyu, the Korean wave.)	2024	Seoul Tourism Foundation Award	
