= Notes from the Last Row =

2026 South Korean television series

- Promotional poster
- Hangul: 맨 끝줄 소년
- Lit.: The Boy in the Last Row
- RR: Maen kkeutjul sonyeon
- MR: Maen kkŭtchul sonyŏn
- Genre: Suspense; Psychological drama
- Based on: El chico de la última fila by Juan Mayorga
- Written by: Jang Myung-woo
- Directed by: Kim Kyu-tae
- Starring: Choi Min-sik; Choi Hyun-wook; Huh Joon-ho; Yunjin Kim; Jin Kyung
- Music by: Choi Sung-kwon; Kim Ji-soo
- Country of origin: South Korea
- Original language: Korean
- No. of episodes: 6

Production
- Executive producers: Jang Se-jung; Choi Kyung-sook; Lee Dong-kyu; Kim Min-ji
- Producer: Bae Sun-hye
- Cinematography: Park Jang-hyuk; Jung Sang-bum
- Editor: Kim Hyang-sook
- Running time: 55–70 minutes
- Production companies: Kakao Entertainment; GTist

Original release
- Network: Netflix
- Release: June 26, 2026

Notes from the Last Row (Korean: 맨 끝줄 소년) is a 2026 South Korean psychological drama television series written by Jang Myung-woo, directed by Kim Gyu-tae, and starring Choi Min-sik, Choi Hyun-wook, Huh Joon-ho, Yunjin Kim, and Jin Kyung. Based on the Spanish play El chico de la última fila by Juan Mayorga, the series follows a disillusioned literature professor and failed novelist who becomes increasingly obsessed with the literary talent of a quiet student sitting in the back row of his classroom. It was released on Netflix on June 26, 2026.

== Synopsis ==
Heo Mun-oh is a university professor of Korean Literature and a failed novelist who has abandoned writing after struggling with feelings of defeat, powerlessness, and lingering insecurity caused by harsh criticism from a peer during his youth. Living an unfulfilled life, Mun-oh harbors a hidden disdain for his students, who struggle to compose proper sentences. His routine changes when he notices Lee Kang, an engineering student who consistently sits in the very back row of the lecture hall. Upon reading Kang's work, Mun-oh becomes deeply captivated by the young man's mysterious persona and innate literary talent. Driven by a desire to nurture a gifted student, Mun-oh offers Kang private writing tutorials. As the lessons progress, Kang's brilliance reignites Mun-oh's long-dormant creative ambitions and personal desires. However, Mun-oh's growing obsession with the student's writing begins to cloud his judgment. Entrapped by the narratives Kang weaves, Mun-oh undergoes behavioral shifts and ultimately becomes entangled in an unexpected series of events that blur the line between reality and fiction.

== Cast and characters ==
=== Main ===
- Choi Min-sik as Heo Mun-oh
  - Koo Ja-keon as young Mun-oh
- Choi Hyun-wook as Lee Kang
- Huh Joon-ho as Kim Su-hun
  - Jang Yeon-woo as young Su-hun
- Yunjin Kim as Ahn Eun-joo
  - Song Chae-rin as young Eun-joo
- Jin Kyung as Jo Hyeon-suk

=== Supporting ===
- Kim Jong-tae as Se-yun's father
- Moon Jeong-hee as Se-yun's mother
- Lee Jin-woo as Kim Se-yun
- Baek Joo-hee as Park Seong-hui
- Han Si-a as Eun-seo

=== Special appearances ===
- Jo Han-chul as Park Hyeong-jong
- Han Ji-eun as Seon Min-hui
- Jung Yi-seo as Kim Jeong-hu
- Im Jae-hyuk as Oh Jae-sik

== Production ==
=== Development ===
The series is a television adaptation of the Spanish play El chico de la última fila by Juan Mayorga, which had previously been staged as a theatrical production in South Korea in late 2024. Written by Jang Myung-woo, who previously adapted the film My Mother, the Mermaid, and directed by Kim Kyu-tae, known for his notable works such as Moon Lovers: Scarlet Heart Ryeo (2016), Our Blues (2022), The Trunk (2024). The project is jointly produced by Kakao Entertainment and GTist. Later, Netflix picked up the six-part series for global distribution.

=== Casting ===
In February 2025, OSEN reported that Choi Min-sik was positively reviewing to star as Heo Mun-oh. The next month, My Daily reported Choi Hyun-wook would join opposite Choi as Lee Kang. The role of Mun-oh's wife, Jo Hyeon-suk, was initially reported to be under consideration by Moon So-ri in mid-March, but replaced by Jin Kyung the following month. Concurrently, Huh Joon-ho reportedly joined the cast as Kim Su-hun. Additional casting reports included Lee Jin-woo, Moon Jeong-hee, Jo Han-chul, and Han Ji-eun in unconfirmed roles. By May 2025, Netflix finalized its primary casting lineup, with the inclusion of Yunjin Kim as Ahn Eun-joo.

=== Filming ===
In an interview with Marie Claire Korea, Choi Hyun-wook stated that principal photography concluded in October 2025.

== Release ==
Netflix confirmed Notes from the Last Row is scheduled to be released in the second quarter of 2026 as part of its annual Korean contents lineup. By May 2026, the series was confirmed to premiere globally on June 26, 2026.
