= Like Flowers in Sand =

2023–2024 South Korean television series

- Promotional poster
- Also known as: Sand Flower
- Hangul: 모래에도 꽃이 핀다
- Lit.: Flowers Bloom Even in the Sand
- RR: Moraeedo kkochi pinda
- MR: Moraeedo kkoch'i p'inda
- Genre: Coming-of-age; Romantic comedy; Sports drama
- Written by: Won Yoo-jung
- Directed by: Kim Jin-woo
- Starring: Jang Dong-yoon; Lee Ju-myoung; Yoon Jong-seok; Kim Bo-ra; Lee Jae-joon; Lee Joo-seung
- Music by: Choi Cheol-ho
- Country of origin: South Korea
- Original language: Korean
- No. of episodes: 12

Production
- Executive producer: Kwak Hyun-jeong
- Producers: Lee Sang-baek; Kwon Hyo-min; Jeong Da-sol
- Running time: 60 minutes
- Production company: AStory

Original release
- Network: ENA
- Release: December 20, 2023 – January 31, 2024

Like Flowers in Sand (Korean: 모래에도 꽃이 핀다) is a 2023–2024 South Korean television series starring Jang Dong-yoon, Lee Ju-myoung, Yoon Jong-seok, Kim Bo-ra, Lee Jae-joon, and Lee Joo-seung. It follows the story of young people who are struggling to bloom in their lives against the backdrop of ssireum city of Geosan. It aired on ENA from December 20, 2023 to January 31, 2024, every Wednesday and Thursday at 21:00 (KST). It is also available for streaming on Netflix in selected regions.

== Synopsis ==
Kim Baek-doo (Jang Dong-yoon) is a ssireum player considering to retire from the sport. However, his life takes a turn when he reunites with his childhood friend Oh Yoo-kyung (Lee Ju-myoung), who becomes the management team leader for his ssireum team. The team is on the verge of disbanding, but with the help of people like Min Hyun-wook (Yoon Jong-seok) and Joo Mi-ran (Kim Bo-ra), as well as the new coach Kwak Jin-soo (Lee Jae-joon) and Baek-doo's best friend Jo Seok-hee (Lee Joo-seung), they work together to save the team.

== Cast ==
=== Main ===
- Jang Dong-yoon as Kim Baek-doo: a Taebaek-class player of the Geosan County Office Ssireum Team, which is on the verge of disbandment, who was called a prodigy because of his outstanding skills.
- Lee Ju-myoung as Oh Yoo-kyung / Oh Doo-sik : Baek-doo's first love who becomes the management team leader of the Geosan County Office Ssireum Team.
- Yoon Jong-seok as Min Hyun-wook: a young man who has lived his whole life with plenty of everything.
- Kim Bo-ra as Joo Mi-ran: a mysterious café owner.
- Lee Jae-joon as Kwak Jin-soo: Baek-doo's long-time rival and a former ssireum wrestler.
- Lee Joo-seung as Jo Seok-hee: Baek-doo's best friend and a police officer working at the Geosan Police Station.

=== Supporting ===
- Choi Moo-sung as Kim Tae-baek: Baek-doo's father who is a legendary ssireum star.
- Jang Young-nam as Ma Jin-sook: Tae-baek's wife and Baek-doo's mother.
- Woo Hyun as Park Pil-doo: an elder in the world of ssireum who runs a local sarangbang.
- Hwang Seok-jeong as Lim Hyun-ja: Jin-soo's mother.
- Jang Hee-jung as Ahn Hyun-jin: Kyung-moon's wife who runs a mill with him in Geosan Market.
- Ahn Chang-hwan as Lee Kyung-moon: one of the few non-ssireum people in Geosan who is a quiet person.
- Seo Jeong-yeon as Chu Mi-sook: Yoo-kyung's role model who is a detective.
- Yang Ki-won as Kim Geum-gang: Baek-doo's eldest brother.
- Lee Yu-joon as Kim Han-ra: Baek-doo's second brother and a YouTuber who runs a personal channel for ssireum contents.
- Park Bo-kyung as Seo Sook-hee: a flower shop owner.
- Lee Ho-chul as Jung Gil-soo: Sook-hee's husband.
- Jo Sin-nae as Kang Jong-mi: a snack bar owner.
- Hyun Jong-woo as Song Young-wook: Jong-mi's husband who is a fitness trainer.
- Hwang Jae-yeol as Park Dong-chan: coach of the Geosan County Office Ssireum Team.
- Kim Min-seok as Kim Beom-soo: the youngest member of the Geosan County Office Ssireum Team.
- Park Kyung-seo as the youngest police officer at Geosan Police Station.
- Yoon Don-seon as the team leader at Geosan Police Station.
- Seo Jin-won as Ahn Ji-yong: a senior policeman at metropolitan investigation unit of the Seoul Metropolitan Police Agency.
- Kim Beop-rae as Hong Man-sik: the governor of Geosan County.

== Production and release ==
Filming began soon after the script reading of the cast, which was held in May 2023.

In June 2023, production company AStory announced that it had signed a license supply contract with Netflix for the overseas broadcasting rights of the series.

== Viewership ==
Like Flowers in Sand : South Korea viewers per episode (thousands)

Season	Episode number											
Season	1	2	3	4	5	6	7	8	9	10	11	12
1	N/A	N/A	N/A	N/A	449	484	488	584	521	559	611	625

Source: Audience measurement performed nationwide by Nielsen Korea.

Average TV viewership ratings
Ep.	Original broadcast date	Average audience share (Nielsen Korea)	
Ep.	Original broadcast date	Nationwide	Seoul
1	December 20, 2023	1.483% (5th)	N/A
2	December 21, 2023	1.413% (9th)	N/A
3	December 27, 2023	1.473% (7th)	N/A
4	December 28, 2023	1.428% (5th)	N/A
5	January 3, 2024	1.855% (3rd)	1.673% (4th)
6	January 4, 2024	2.148% (2nd)	1.752% (2nd)
7	January 10, 2024	2.023% (3rd)	1.824% (3rd)
8	January 11, 2024	2.396% (2nd)	2.356% (2nd)
9	January 17, 2024	2.358% (3rd)	2.242% (3rd)
10	January 18, 2024	2.778% (2nd)	2.690% (2nd)
11	January 24, 2024	2.758% (2nd)	2.804% (2nd)
12	January 31, 2024l	2.835% (4th)	2.728% (6th)
Average		2.079%	— (Note: Due to multiple unpublished ratings, the exact average rating is unknown.)
In the table above, the blue numbers represent the lowest ratings and the red numbers represent the highest ratings.; N/A denotes ratings that were not published.; This series aired on a cable channel/pay TV which normally has a relatively smaller audience compared to free-to-air TV/public broadcasters (KBS, SBS, MBC, and EBS).
