= High Cookie =

2023 South Korean TV series

- Promotional poster
- Also known as: Hi Cookie
- Hangul: 하이쿠키
- RR: Haikuki
- MR: Haik'uk'i
- Genre: Mystery; Thriller; Crime
- Written by: Kang Han
- Directed by: Song Min-yeop
- Starring: Nam Ji-hyun; Choi Hyun-wook; Kim Mu-yeol; Jung Da-bin
- Country of origin: South Korea
- Original language: Korean
- No. of episodes: 20

Production
- Running time: 30 minutes
- Production companies: Arc Media; Monster Union; Studio X+U

Original release
- Network: U+ Mobile TV
- Release: October 23 – November 23, 2023

High Cookie (Korean: 하이쿠키) is a South Korean streaming television series written by Kang Han, directed by Song Min-yeop, and starring Nam Ji-hyun, Choi Hyun-wook, Kim Mu-yeol and Jung Da-bin. It aired on U+ Mobile TV from October 23 to November 23, 2023, every Monday to Thursday. It is also available for streaming on Netflix Korea.

== Synopsis ==
The series is about an elite high school being engulfed by a mysterious homemade cookie that makes desires come true with just one bite. However, having more than one cookie can cost one their life. After Choi Soo-young (Nam Ji-hyun)'s sister falls prey to the cookie and goes into a coma, she pretends to be a student at Jeonghan High School to find the antidote as well as the Chef, the maker of the cookies.

== Cast ==
=== Main ===
- Nam Ji-hyun as Choi Soo-young / Lee Eun-seo

A non-regular factory worker and the older sister of Min-young. Soo-young became the head of the family at the age of only 18, and dropped out of school to take care of her younger sister. After Min-young gets into an accident, she is forced to enter Jeonghan High School under the new identity of Lee Eun-seo to find her sister's assailant.

- Choi Hyun-wook as Seo Ho-su

A genius student who maintains top grades at Jeonghan High School, the best private high school in Korea. He perseveres in his studies despite difficult circumstances, and he is known as an easy-to-use 'good guy' among his wealthy classmates.

- Kim Mu-yeol as Yoo Seong-pil

The best college entrance exam consultant in the shadows. Seong-pil is famous for making students' dreams come true by providing the best results regardless of whether it is legal, expedient, or illegal, but he is a person who is completely shrouded in mystery. He comes to Jeonghan High School on his own initiative and offers to serve as a consultant for all 3rd grade students.

- Jung Da-bin as Choi Min-young

Soo-young's younger sister who is a student at Jeonghan High School. She acts cold, but loves her sister a lot. Due to having a scar on her face, she always wears a mask to hide it. She was the distributor of the cookies.

=== Supporting ===
- Seo Bum-june as Song Jin-woo

The most popular student who gets the best grades. He is the school's chairman's grandson, and uses his privilege to do as he pleases.

- Chae Seo-eun as Park Hee-jin

An honor student in Class S. She has a crush on Jin-woo and becomes jealous when he becomes friendly with Min-young.

== Production ==
High Cookie was co-produced by Arc Media and Monster Union, and was released on U+ Mobile TV and Netflix. (Note: It is only available on Netflix Korea.) Since it is about youth and drugs and thus not easy to cover on terrestrial broadcasters, it was broadcast on OTT to increase efficiency. After its first release on October 23, 2023, it ranked high on Netflix Korea, and is known to have had a positive impact on the increase in U+ mobile TV subscribers.

== Reception ==
Immediately after its release, High Cookie ranked first in U+ Mobile TV content ranking including movies and dramas. Kino Rights ranked it first for two consecutive weeks and three weeks in total including the first day of its release. It also ranked first among non-original series and second in the top 10 on Netflix in Korea. The actors were also praised for their performance in the show.

== Awards and nominations ==
Name of the award ceremony, year presented, category, nominee(s) of the award, and the result of the nomination
Award ceremony	Year	Category	Nominee / Work	Result	Ref.
Blue Dragon Series Awards	2024	Best New Actor	Choi Hyun-wook	Nominated	
