= Choi Hyun-wook =

South Korean actor (born 2002)

- Choi in 2026
- Born: January 30, 2002 (age 24); South Korea
- Education: Hanlim Multi Art School
- Occupation: Actor
- Years active: 2019–present
- Agent: Gold Medalist

Korean name
- Hangul: 최현욱
- RR: Choe Hyeonuk
- MR: Ch'oe Hyŏnuk

Choi Hyun-wook (Korean: 최현욱; born January 30, 2002) is a South Korean actor. He began his acting career with a leading role in the web drama Real:Time:Love in 2019 and gained more recognition with roles in 2021 SBS television series Taxi Driver and Racket Boys. He has since become known for starring in Twenty-Five Twenty-One (2022), Weak Hero Class 1 (2022), D.P. 2 (2021–2023), Twinkling Watermelon (2023), My Dearest Nemesis (2025), Mantis (2025), and Dead-End Job (2026).

== Early life ==
Choi Hyun-wook was born on January 30, 2002. During his childhood, he played baseball for ten years. In his first year of high school, he sustained an elbow injury and underwent surgery and rehabilitation, but it did not improve his condition. Due to the situation, he changed his career path and pursued acting. Eventually, Choi left Gangneung High School as well as his position at the school's baseball team and transferred to Hanlim Multi Art School at Broadcasting & Entertainment Department until he graduated.

== Career ==
On March 23, 2020, Choi's agency Goldmedalist confirmed that he has been cast for the web drama Pop Out Boy!, based on the popular webtoon of the same name. The series began filming the following month. It started to air on June 25. In April 2021, Choi appeared in a SBS drama Taxi Driver as Park Seung-tae, a school bully. He was the antagonist on the series' episode 3 and 4. A month earlier, he was selected to star in another SBS drama, Racket Boys. Choi briefly appeared on Jirisan as Lim Cheol-kyeong in a flashback with Seo Yi-kang, one of the main characters.

In 2022, Choi rose in popularity after he starred in the coming-of-age television series Twenty-Five Twenty-One alongside Kim Tae-ri, Nam Joo-hyuk, Kim Ji-yeon and Lee Joo-myung. The same year, he starred in the television series Weak Hero Class 1 alongside Hong Kyung and Park Ji-hoon. In 2023, he starred in Twinkling Watermelon alongside Ryeoun, Seol In-ah, and Shin Eun-soo. In May 2025, it was revealed that Choi reprised his role of An Soo-ho, from series Weak Hero Class 1 in second season but as special appearance. He has earned the sobriquet "Nation's Boyfriend" by several media outlets.

In 2026, Choi starred in the tvN reality show Curtain Up, Class! alongside Twenty-Five Twenty-One co-star Kim Tae-ri. In June, he led in Netflix original series, Notes from the Last Row alongside Choi Min-sik. In November, he briefly appeared in the first episode of a Netflix original series, Dead-End Job.

== Filmography ==
=== Film ===
| Year | Title | Role | Notes | Ref. |
|---|---|---|---|---|
| 2025 | Mantis | Benjamin Jo | | |
| 2025 | Good News | Haneda Airport couple passenger | Cameo | |

=== Television series ===
| Year | Title | Role | Notes | Ref. |
|---|---|---|---|---|
| 2021 | Taxi Driver | Park Seung-tae | Cameo (episode 3–4) | |
| 2021 | Racket Boys | Na Woo-chan | | |
| 2021 | Jirisan | teenager Lim Cheol-kyeong | Cameo (episode 6) | |
| 2022 | Twenty-Five Twenty-One | Moon Ji-woong | | |
| 2022–2025 | Weak Hero | An Soo-ho | | |
| 2023 | D.P. | Shin Ah-hui | Season 2 | |
| 2023 | Twinkling Watermelon | Ha Yi-chan | | |
| 2023 | High Cookie | Seo Ho-soo | | |
| 2025 | My Dearest Nemesis | Ban Joo-yeon | | |
| 2026 | Notes from the Last Row | Lee Kang | | |
| 2026 | Dead-End Job | Choi Hee-dong | Cameo (episode 1) | |
| 2027 | Portraits of Delusion † | | | |

=== Web series ===
| Year | Title | Role | Notes | Ref. |
|---|---|---|---|---|
| 2019–2020 | Real: Time: Love | Moon Ye-chan | Season 1–4 | |
| 2020 | Pop Out Boy! | Noh Ye-joon | | |

=== Television shows ===
| Year | Title | Role | Notes | Ref. |
|---|---|---|---|---|
| 2026 | Curtain Up, Class! | Cast member | | |

=== Music video appearances ===
| Year | Song title | Artist | Ref. |
|---|---|---|---|
| 2022 | "Ditto" | NewJeans | |
| 2023 | "Alley" (골목길) | Lee Hi (feat. Sung Si-kyung) | |
| 2024 | "My Beloved" (그대가 해준 말) | Lee Hi | |

== Discography ==
=== Soundtrack appearances ===
List of soundtrack appearances with selected chart position, showing year released and album name
| Title | Year | Peak chart positions | | Album |
| Title | Year | KOR | KOR Hot | Album |
|---|---|---|---|---|
| "With" (with Kim Ji-yeon, Kim Tae-ri, Lee Joo-myung, and Nam Joo-hyuk) | 2022 | 40 | 54 | Twenty-Five Twenty-One OST |

== Awards and nominations ==
Name of the award ceremony, year presented, category, nominee of the award, and the result of the nomination
| Award ceremony | Year | Category | Nominee / Work | Result | Ref. |
|---|---|---|---|---|---|
| APAN Star Awards | 2022 | Best New Actor | Racket Boys; Twenty-Five Twenty-One | Nominated | |
| Asia Contents Awards | 2022 | New Comer – Actor | Twenty-Five Twenty-One | Nominated | |
| Baeksang Arts Awards | 2022 | Best New Actor – Television | Twenty-Five Twenty-One | Nominated | |
| Blue Dragon Series Awards | 2023 | Whynot Award | Weak Hero Class 1 | Won | |
| Blue Dragon Series Awards | 2024 | Best New Actor | High Cookie | Nominated | |
| Brand Customer Loyalty Award | 2022 | Best New Actor | Choi Hyun-wook | Won | |
| Fundex Awards | 2023 | Best of TV Drama Actor | Twinkling Watermelon | Nominated | |
| Korea Drama Awards | 2026 | Excellence Award, Actor | Notes from the Last Row | Nominated | |
| Newsis K-Expo Cultural Awards | 2026 | National Assembly Culture, Sports and Tourism Committee Chairperson's Award | Choi Hyun-wook | Won | |
| SBS Drama Awards | 2021 | Best New Actor | Racket Boys; Taxi Driver | Won | |
