= My Dearest Nemesis =

2025 South Korean television series

- Promotional poster
- Hangul: 그놈은 흑염룡
- Lit.: He's the Black Dragon
- RR: Geunomeun heugyeomnyong
- MR: Kŭnomŭn hŭgyŏmnyong
- Genre: Romantic comedy
- Based on: He's a Black Dragon by Hye Jin-yang
- Written by: Kim Soo-yeon
- Directed by: Lee So-hyun
- Starring: Moon Ga-young; Choi Hyun-wook; Im Se-mi; Kwak Si-yang
- Music by: Kim Joon-seok: Jeong Se-rin
- Country of origin: South Korea
- Original language: Korean
- No. of episodes: 12

Production
- Running time: 60 minutes
- Production company: Studio N

Original release
- Network: tvN
- Release: February 17 – March 24, 2025

My Dearest Nemesis (Korean: 그놈은 흑염룡) is a 2025 South Korean television series written by Kim Soo-yeon, directed by Lee So-hyun, and starring Moon Ga-young, Choi Hyun-wook, Im Se-mi and Kwak Si-yang. Based on the webtoon of the same name by Hye Jin-yang, it revolves around a boss and an employee who shared a past relationship. It aired on tvN every Monday and Tuesday at 20:50 (KST) from February 17 to March 24, 2025. It is also available for streaming on TVING in South Korea, U-Next in Japan, Vidio in Indonesia, and Viki in selected regions.

== Synopsis ==
It tells the story of Ban Ju-yeon (played by Choi) and Baek Su-jeong (played by Moon) who first meet via their online game characters during their school days, then meet again in real life as boss and employee 16 years later.

== Cast ==
=== Main ===
- Moon Ga-young as Baek Soo-jung

The planning team leader at Yongseong Department Store.

- Choi Hyun-wook as Ban Joo-yeon
  - Moon Woo-jin as young Joo-yeon

The head of the strategic planning division of Yongseong Department Store.

- Im Se-mi as Seo Ha-jin

A bar owner of Sulo's.

- Kwak Si-yang as Kim Shin-won

The head of the design department at Yongseong Department Store.

=== Supporting ===
- Ban Hyo-jung as Jeong Hyo-sun
- Ko Chang-seok as Baek Won-seop

Baek Soo-jung's father.

- Kim Young-ah as Kwon In-kyung

Joo-yeon's secretary.

- Son Sang-yeon as Baek Soo-bin
- Kim Woo-gyeom as Yang Jun-su
- Lim Young-joo as Choi Na-na

=== Others ===
- Oh Eui-shik as TVXQ-tip

== Production and release ==
=== Development ===
My Dearest Nemesis was developed under the working title Black Salt Dragon. The series is based on a webtoon by Hye Jin-yang. It was directed by Lee Soo-hyun, who directed Delightfully Deceitful, and the screenplay is written by writer Kim Soo-yeon. It was produced by Studio N and planned by Studio Dragon.

=== Casting ===
On April 2, 2024, it was reported that Moon Ga-young and Choi Hyun-wook were in talks to be cast. On July 12, tvN announced that Moon and Choi had been cast. On July 15, Im Se-mi and Kwak Si-yang reportedly confirmed their appearances.

=== Release ===
The series premiered on tvN on February 17, 2025, and aired every Monday and Tuesday at 20:50 (KST). It is also available for streaming on TVING in South Korea, U-Next in Japan, Vidio in Indonesia, and Viki in selected regions. The series topped in Viki in 136 countries, including in the U.S., the U.K., France, Brazil, Mexico, India and the United Arab Emirates.

== Viewership ==
My Dearest Nemesis : South Korea viewers per episode (thousands)

Season	Episode number												Average
Season	1	2	3	4	5	6	7	8	9	10	11	12	Average
1	846	919	1079	966	1171	1258	1043	934	912	1038	993	968	1011

Source: Audience measurement performed nationwide by Nielsen Korea.

Average TV viewership ratings
Ep.	Original broadcast date	Average audience share (Nielsen Korea)	
Ep.	Original broadcast date	Nationwide	Seoul
1	February 17, 2025	3.534% (1st)	3.663% (1st)
2	February 18, 2025	3.459% (1st)	3.352% (1st)
3	February 24, 2025	4.533% (1st)	4.560% (1st)
4	February 25, 2025	4.079% (1st)	4.150% (1st)
5	March 3, 2025	4.927% (1st)	4.905% (1st)
6	March 4, 2025	5.078% (1st)	4.871% (1st)
7	March 10, 2025	4.456% (1st)	4.620% (1st)
8	March 11, 2025	4.011% (1st)	4.112% (1st)
9	March 17, 2025	3.727% (1st)	3.801% (1st)
10	March 18, 2025	4.169% (1st)	4.388% (1st)
11	March 24, 2025	4.347% (2nd)	3.940% (2nd)
12	March 24, 2025	4.132% (1st)	3.407% (1st)
Average		4.204%	4.147%
In the table above, the blue numbers represent the lowest ratings and the red numbers represent the highest ratings.; This drama airs on a cable channel/pay TV which normally has a relatively smaller audience compared to free-to-air TV/public broadcasters (KBS, SBS, MBC, and EBS).
