= Twenty-Five Twenty-One =

2022 South Korean television series

- Promotional poster
- Hangul: 스물다섯 스물하나
- RR: Seumuldaseot seumulhana
- MR: Sŭmuldasŏt sŭmurhana
- Genre: Romance; Coming-of-age
- Developed by: Hong Ki-sung (tvN); Kim Young-kyu (Studio Dragon)
- Written by: Kwon Do-eun
- Directed by: Jung Ji-hyun
- Starring: Kim Tae-ri; Nam Joo-hyuk; Bona; Choi Hyun-wook; Lee Ju-myoung
- Music by: Lim Ha-young
- Country of origin: South Korea
- Original language: Korean
- No. of episodes: 16

Production
- Executive producer: Kim Seon-tae
- Producers: Yoon Ha-rim; Heo Seok-won; Park Hun-joo
- Camera setup: Single-camera
- Running time: 80 minutes
- Production company: Hwa&Dam Pictures

Original release
- Network: tvN
- Release: February 12 – April 3, 2022

Twenty-Five Twenty-One (Korean: 스물다섯 스물하나) is a 2022 South Korean television series directed by Jung Ji-hyun and starring Kim Tae-ri, Nam Joo-hyuk, Kim Ji-yeon, Choi Hyun-wook and Lee Joo-myung. The series depicts the romantic lives of five characters spanning from 1998 to 2021. It premiered on tvN on February 12, 2022, and aired every Saturday and Sunday at 21:10 (KST) for 16 episodes. It is available for streaming on Netflix.

The series was a commercial hit and became one of the highest-rated dramas in Korean cable television history.

== Plot ==
In 1998, Na Hee-do (Kim Tae-ri) is a member of the school fencing team at Seonjung Girls' High School, but due to the IMF crisis, the team is disbanded. To continue pursuing her passion, she transfers to Taeyang High School and later manages to become a member of the National Fencing Team. Baek Yi-jin's (Nam Joo-hyuk) family had gone from "riches to rags" and is separated due to the financial crisis. He is forced to take up several part-time jobs and later becomes a sports reporter.

In present day, Kim Min-chae (Choi Myung-bin), Na Hee-do's daughter, quits ballet and "runs away" to her grandma's house. During her stay, she comes across her mother's diary, through which the story is then told.

== Cast ==
=== Main ===
- Kim Tae-ri as Na Hee-do (나희도)
  - Kim So-hyun as adult Na Hee-do
  - Ok Ye-rin as young Na Hee-do

A fencing prodigy, who has yet to reach her fullest potential. She idolizes Ko Yu-rim and transfers to her high school specifically to train with her.

- Nam Joo-hyuk as Baek Yi-jin (백이진)

A hardworking young man whose chaebol family went bankrupt during the IMF crisis. As such, he moves out on his own in an attempt to rebuild his life despite debt collectors knocking on his door all the time.

- Bona as Ko Yu-rim/Julia Ko (고유림)
  - Kyung Da-eun as young Ko Yu-rim

A high school fencing gold medalist who, at the start of the series, Hee-do idolizes, and who later becomes her rival. Despite their rivalry, she and Hee-do must work together.

- Choi Hyun-wook as Moon Ji-woong (문지웅)

Na Hee-do's classmate and the most popular boy in school.

- Lee Ju-myoung as Ji Seung-wan (지승완)

The class president and Moon Ji-woong's childhood best friend. She has an anonymous radio talk show in which she raises awareness on the problems of the youth while also giving guidance to fellow students.

=== Supporting ===
==== People around Na Hee-do ====
- Seo Jae-hee as Shin Jae-kyung (신재경)

Na Hee-do's mother, and the main anchor of the UBS Nine O'Clock News.

- Baek Seok-gwang as Na Seong-jin (나성진)

Na Hee-do's father. Primarily appearing in flashbacks, he is shown to be the key player in Na Hee-do's interest in fencing.

- Choi Myung-bin as Kim Min-chae (김민채)
  - Lee So-yeon as young Kim Min-chae

Na Hee-do's daughter. She is a ballet dancer who quit and ran away to her grandmother's home, later finding her mother's diary which chronicles her teenage years. The identity of her father is left unknown throughout the show.

==== People around Baek Yi-jin ====
- Park Yoon-hee as Baek Seong-hak (백성학)

Baek Yi-jin's father, who is in debt due to the IMF crisis.

- Kim Young-sun as Baek Yi-jin's mother
- Park Jun-pyo as Baek Yi-jin's maternal uncle

He is the one who accepted Yi-jin's family when they had no place to go after bankruptcy.

- Kim Nam-i as Baek Yi-jin's paternal aunt
- Choi Min-young as Baek Yi-hyun (백이현)
  - Kang Hoon as adult Baek Yi-hyun

Baek Yi-jin's younger brother.

==== Family of the other main characters ====
- So Hee-jung as Ji Seung-wan's mother

She is also Baek Yi-jin's landlady.

- Heo Jin-na as Ko Yu-rim's mother

The owner of a small restaurant.

- Kim Dong-gyun as Ko Yu-rim's father

A professional delivery driver.

==== Taeyang High School's fencing club ====
- Kim Hye-eun as Yang Chan-mi (양찬미)

The coach of the fencing team who enjoyed many honors as a gold medalist in fencing. She once accepted bribes and still feels betrayed by her friend Shin Jae-kyung who covered the story as a field reporter.

- Jo Bo-young as Lee Ye-ji (이예지)

1st year high school student.

- Lee Ye-jin as Park Han-sol (박한솔)

1st year high school student.

- Moon Woo-bin as Kang Ji-soo (강지수)

3rd year high school student.

- Bang Eun-jung as Lee Da-seul (이다슬)

3rd year high school student.

=== Others ===
- Lee Chan-jong as Seo Jung-hyeok (서정혁)

UBS reporter and Baek Yi-jin's senior.

=== Special appearance ===
- Lee Joong-ok as Na Hee-do's coach at the fencing club of her old high school
- Jung Yoo-min as Hwang Bo-mi (황보미), a student at Seonjung Girls' High School
- Jang Jun-hyun as Director of Han River C&T, an old acquaintance of Baek Yi-jin
- Choi Tae-joon as Jeong Ho-jin (정호진), a national fencing representative
- Yoon Joo-man as Park PD, UBS producer
- Kim Jun-ho as Kim Jun-ho (김준호), Na Hee-do's senior in the national fencing team
- Kim Nam-hee as a mobile store salesperson
- Jeon Soo-hwan as Han River C&T interviewer
- Song Jae-jae as Han River C&T interview host
- Hong Eun-jung as Han River C&T job applicant
- Goo Ja-geon as Han River C&T job applicant
- Choi Gyo-sik as local resident
- Son Young-soon as old woman on the bus
- Ok Joo-ri as owner of a local shop
- Jeon Se-yong as man who resembles Baek Yi-jin's father

== Episodes ==
No.	Title	Directed by	Written by	Original release date
1	"Episode 1"; Transliteration: "Je-il-hwe" (Korean: 제1회)	Jung Ji-hyun	Kwon Do-eun	February 12, 2022
The episode begins during the COVID-19 pandemic in 2021 when retired fencing athlete Na Hee-do's 15-year-old daughter Kim Min-chae gives up ballet and returns to her grandmother's house, where she chances upon her mother's diary written back in 1998. As Min-chae begins to read one of the diary entries, the time flashes back to 1998, when South Korea is grappling with the impact of the IMF financial crisis. At that point in time, high-school fencer Na Hee-do, then 18 years old, receives the shocking news that her school will permanently dissolve the fencing club due to financial difficulties caused by the IMF incident. As a result, Hee-do resolves to get herself transferred to Taeyang High, where her idol athlete and national gold medalist Ko Yu-rim is studying and training. During one of her attempts to execute her plan, Hee-do meets 22-year-old news vendor Baek Yi-jin.
2	"Episode 2"; Transliteration: "Je-i-hwe" (Korean: 제2회)	Jung Ji-hyun	Kwon Do-eun	February 13, 2022
On her first day at Taeyang High, Hee-do befriends two of her classmates—Ji Seung-wan and Moon Ji-woong—shortly before she finally gets to meet Yu-rim at the fencing club. On their first meeting however, Yu-rim displays a cold attitude which greatly offends and surprises Hee-do. Not only that, she accidentally eavesdrops on Yi-jin's confrontation with his father's debtors, who came to demand their pay and the whereabouts of Yi-jin's father after their chaebol family went bankrupt. Seeing this, Hee-do finds a way to cheer Yi-jin up, which helps forge a deeper bond between them.
3	"Episode 3"; Transliteration: "Je-sam-hwe" (Korean: 제3회)	Jung Ji-hyun	Kwon Do-eun	February 19, 2022
Hee-do receives news during her training session that she is unexpectedly qualified to participate in the national team selection tournament, which motivates her to approach her coach Yang Chan-mi to give her extra training lessons. One night, when Yu-rim and Hee-do are staying late at school for training, they are unreasonably chided and taunted by an envious senior, who forces them to apologise; while Yu-rim does so, Hee-do refuses to apologise. Disappointed with Yu-rim's actions and her prior behaviour towards her, Hee-do puts away her mementos of Yu-rim's tournament feats and under the username "Ryder37", Hee-do chats with her online friend "Injeolmi" to let out her depressed feelings, and Injeolmi consoles her. Meanwhile, Yi-jin unexpectedly is visited by his father, who misses him and thus came back to visit him.
4	"Episode 4"; Transliteration: "Je-sa-hwe" (Korean: 제4회)	Jung Ji-hyun	Kwon Do-eun	February 20, 2022
In exchange for dancing lessons (required for her extra training), Hee-do agrees to Ji-woong's request to give a drink to Yu-rim, on whom Ji-woong has a crush; the errand does not give Yu-rim a better opinion of Hee-do. On the way home, Hee-do happens to come across a drunk Yi-jin sleeping outside the house of his landlord (who is also Seung-wan's mother). Earlier, Yi-jin went for a job interview but did not pass it, given that he has only a high school diploma and did not complete his university degree. Out of disappointment, he went out to drink. Seeing this, Hee-do covers Yi-jin with a blanket and puts up a sign for passers-by to not disturb his sleep. The later part of the episode focuses on the growing relationship between Yi-jin, Hee-do, Seung-wan, Yu-rim and Ji-woong (save for the bad blood between Yu-rim and Hee-do) at Seung-wan's house.
5	"Episode 5"; Transliteration: "Je-o-hwe" (Korean: 제5회)	Jung Ji-hyun	Kwon Do-eun	February 26, 2022
On the day of her qualifying tournament, Hee-do puts up a tremendous and exciting performance, beating a higher-rated fencer to win the final bout and qualify for a place on the Korean national team, which brings joy to her coach but chagrin to Yu-rim. Just when she is about to share the good news with Yi-jin, Hee-do discovers that he has gone missing, and her efforts to find him fail. It turns out that Yi-jin, in an attempt to hide from his father's creditors, fled, along with his brother, to the seaside town where his uncle lives, where he takes a job selling fish. This hiding lasts for a year. During his time away, Hee-do and Yi-jin find comfort in each other's payphone voice messages.
6	"Episode 6"; Transliteration: "Je-yuk-hwe" (Korean: 제6회)	Jung Ji-hyun	Kwon Do-eun	February 27, 2022
The days at the national team's training center does not help improve the bad relationship between Hee-do and Yu-rim, who begin to view each other as arch-rivals. Hee-do unexpectedly reunites with Yi-jin, who became a sports reporter after a successful interview. The day of the Gyeongju Asian Games' fencing finals arrives, but a few hours before the start of the tournament, Hee-do discovers that her fencing equipment (which Yi-jin gifted her) was mistakenly taken by a Japanese participant, and she has to rush to the train station, where she manages to retrieve her fencing bag right before the Japanese athlete's train departure. Even though she does not have enough time to go back to the stadium, Yi-jin manages to help avert the crisis and allows her to reach back on time.
7	"Episode 7"; Transliteration: "Je-chil-hwe" (Korean: 제7회)	Jung Ji-hyun	Kwon Do-eun	March 5, 2022
After a tense battle at the Asian Games, Hee-do is awarded the final point on a call by the referee, defeating Yu-rim with a score of 15–14, and winning the gold medal. In the press conference following, Yu-rim complains that the referee made a bad call, and the media picks up the story, suggesting that the results were manipulated. This causes Hee-do to suffer backlash from the public. Her depression is further aggravated when her mother, the famous news anchor Shin Jae-kyung, labels her gold medal as "stolen" in her broadcast. Yi-jin is desperate to prove that Hee-do won the medal fairly and manages to convince the tournament's referee to give an interview just before he is about to leave for Australia. As Hee-do quietly runs away and eats at a restaurant, she chances upon Yi-jin's exclusive report and she releases her emotions and cries as a group of grandpas kindly console her and congratulate her on her victory. Rather than going home, Hee-do decides to spend the night in the makeshift clubhouse on the school's roof, but the janitor, unaware that she was there, locks the door from the outside, locking her inside.
8	"Episode 8"; Transliteration: "Je-pal-hwe" (Korean: 제8회)	Jung Ji-hyun	Kwon Do-eun	March 6, 2022
Yi-jin, Seung-wan, and Ji-woong manage to rescue Hee-do after she is locked by mistake in the school's rooftop storeroom, but she is left confused and jealous over Yi-jin's recorded confession towards his ex-girlfriend. Yi-jin meets Yu-rim the next day at her mother's restaurant, where Yu-rim expresses her regret over the unexpected backlash on Hee-do, but it does not help amend the cracks in their relationship, as the two of them reluctantly help Ji-woong and Seung-wan to clean Yi-jin's rented room and move his belongings. Hee-do then begins noticing her growing feelings for Yi-jin as she starts getting flustered over everything he does for her. Meanwhile, back at Yu-rim's home, her mother is scammed of her money, which causes the poor financial situation of the family to get even worse. After receiving a three-month suspension from future tournaments and rejection of her pension application, Yu-rim secretly cries at the swimming pool and dives from the platform. Hee-do (who got the same penalty) can not help but pity her as she accidentally witnesses the sorry sight of Yu-rim. After exchanging words with her online friend "Injeolmi" about what she saw earlier and receiving Injeolmi's advice, Hee-do, without knowing that Injeolmi is actually Ko Yu-rim herself, agrees to Yu-rim's request to meet her at a park, each carrying a yellow rose to recognise each other.
9	"Episode 9"; Transliteration: "Je-ku-hwe" (Korean: 제9회)	Jung Ji-hyun	Kwon Do-eun	March 12, 2022
Yu-rim goes into hiding after she sees Hee-do, whom she realises was her online friend "Ryder37", and gives Yi-jin her yellow rose, which makes Hee-do mistake him as "Injeolmi" and gives her confidence to boldly confess her feelings for him. Yi-jin quickly clarifies to Hee-do that he is not Injeolmi and states it was a mistaken identity, and immediately, Hee-do becomes embarrassed and quickly leaves the park as Yu-rim watches while in hiding; Yu-rim is equally feeling ashamed and confused over her past treatment of Hee-do in the face of truth. The next day, Yu-rim begins to behave unusually towards Hee-do, who is confused over the sudden change of behaviour. When the school fencing team gathers for a meal at Yu-rim's mother's restaurant, Yu-rim's mother kindly consoles Hee-do for what she went through and praises her for her victory. Yi-jin arrives at Hee-do's school the next day with an assignment to film a sports documentary about Hee-do and Yu-rim; Hee-do's objections at this project causes Yu-rim to be more guilty towards Hee-do. Yi-jin confronts Hee-do who seems to have been avoiding him after the "Injeolmi" incident and she then confesses to him again that she likes him and these feelings she has for him have been consuming her for a while. Meanwhile, after enduring it for another day, Yu-rim finally comes clean to Hee-do about Injeolmi and apologises to her. Hee-do forgives her and the two start to become friends. Yi-jin spends the following days filming their training sessions and his relationship with Hee-do becomes closer.
10	"Episode 10"; Transliteration: "Je-sip-hwe" (Korean: 제10회)	Jung Ji-hyun	Kwon Do-eun	March 13, 2022
Yi-jin struggles with his colleagues' disapproval of his academic background, and during a heart-to-heart conversation with his senior Seo Jung-hyuk, Yi-jin expresses his hope to prove that high school graduates can also succeed in their careers as reporters. His depressed feelings are later reassured by a phone call from his father. On that same night, Yu-rim and Ji-woong begin to grow closer as she confides to him her family's massive poverty, and both of them help Seung-wan move her belongings in the school. The next day, Yi-jin gets an approval from Chan-mi to bring both Yu-rim and Hee-do to the seaside under the pretext of filming. The trio are joined by Ji-woong and Seung-wan, and the five of them have a good time on the beach.
11	"Episode 11"; Transliteration: "Je-sip-il-hwe" (Korean: 제11회)	Jung Ji-hyun	Kwon Do-eun	March 19, 2022
The day after the five friends return from their beach trip together, Hee-do finally asks Yu-rim why she disliked her from the start. Yu-rim reveals that she actually met Hee-do before in a children's fencing match and lost greatly to her, which made her feel resolved to become better than Hee-do, whom she considered her greatest rival from that day onwards (Hee-do has no memory of the event), so she felt disappointed at Hee-do for not achieving much by the time she met her again on Hee-do's first day at school. Hee-do and Yi-jin later go out together for dinner, and they grow closer and closer to each other. The following day starts with Hee-do promising to go with her mother to fix her late father's chairs, but Jae-kyung fails to keep the promise due to her workload. Hee-do seeks solace from Yi-jin over this incident and he comforts her, as she feels disappointed towards her mother, in addition to her resentment towards Jae-kyung because of her absence from her father's deathbed and her not talking about her father again after his passing, which led Hee-do to assume that her mother does not miss him at all. Meanwhile, Ji-woong feels disappointed that Yu-rim cannot be present at the school music festival to watch his performance, which gives Yi-jin an idea to bring Yu-rim and Hee-do away from their training center with an excuse. The episode ends with Jae-kyung finally bringing her daughter to her husband's grave, where she finally admits that she missed her husband all along and reconciles with Hee-do.
12	"Episode 12"; Transliteration: "Je-sip-i-hwe" (Korean: 제12회)	Jung Ji-hyun	Kwon Do-eun	March 20, 2022
Seung-wan reports to the police after she witnesses an abusive teacher unreasonably subjecting Ji-woong to corporal punishment, which was legally banned in schools, but the police officers are nonchalant towards the teacher's acts, and Seung-wan exposes it to the public on her radio show. After the teacher demands Seung-wan to apologise or risk transferring to another school with a tainted record, Seung-wan decides to drop out of school and her mother unconditionally supports her, even going as far as to publicly condemning the teacher for his mistreatment of Ji-woong and Seung-wan. Hee-do's teammate Lee Ye-ji expresses her intention to quit fencing, but Chan-mi reprimands her and asks her to stay until she reaches the quarter-finals; Hee-do and Yu-rim help her to train in the following days and Ye-ji reaches the quarter-finals as Chan-mi hoped. Despite having reached the quarter-finals, Ye-ji bravely tells Chan-mi that she wants to quit to pursue a new passion, and it finally convinces Chan-mi to support her decision. Both Hee-do and Yu-rim help both Seung-wan and Ye-ji to celebrate the new beginnings of their lives. All the while, aside from his remarkable advancement in his career, Yi-jin and Hee-do are getting more and more drawn to each other as their relationship begins to take a new turn.
13	"Episode 13"; Transliteration: "Je-sip-sam-hwe" (Korean: 제13회)	Jung Ji-hyun	Kwon Do-eun	March 26, 2022
As Yi-jin's career takes a turn for the better, his relationship with Hee-do poses a greater risk to him because as a reporter, he is not allowed to have a personal relationship with the subject of his news reports, which may potentially bring harm to both Hee-do and himself in the future. This possibility makes him even more stressed and forces him to keep a distance from Hee-do. Hee-do herself is also not faring well emotionally, since on the first day of the new millennium she kissed Yi-jin and kept going to him to confess her feelings, but he kept pushing her away. Yi-jin later admits his own feelings and agrees to try the romantic love with Hee-do as he decides to forgo his determination to keep a distance from her.
14	"Episode 14"; Transliteration: "Je-sip-sa-hwe" (Korean: 제14회)	Jung Ji-hyun	Kwon Do-eun	March 27, 2022
Hee-do and Yi-jin announce that they are dating to their friends. Yu-rim later becomes a Russian citizen to resolve her family's difficult financial situation, which was caused by her father's need to compensate the family of a pedestrian he accidentally hit with his truck, as well as the previous unpaid debts of her family. This is reported exclusively by Yi-jin, sparking nationwide outrage and condemnation much to Yi-jin's guilt. Misery lingers on the final days Yu-rim spends with her family and friends in South Korea. On the day of Yu-rim's flight, Ji-woong finally confesses to Yu-rim and tells her about his resolve to wait for her no matter how long they will be separated, which touches Yu-rim and they both embrace before Yu-rim's departure.
15	"Episode 15"; Transliteration: "Je-sip-o-hwe" (Korean: 제15회)	Jung Ji-hyun	Kwon Do-eun	April 2, 2022
Hee-do and Yi-jin celebrate the new year together as they enter the ages of 21 and 25 years old respectively. They make time to go on dates as they both enjoy their romantic relationship and keep loving each other despite their busy schedules. Meanwhile, Hee-do and Yu-rim continue to contact each other, but they gradually stop doing so as the result of rumours and fake news that falsely painted the two friends as bitter rivals who clashed over Yu-rim's "traitorous" betrayal of her own country and people. The girls reunite in the finals of an intense international tournament, and despite Hee-do's victory, their sincere friendship attracts media attention and deeply touches the audiences. Yi-jin and Hee-do gradually drift apart from each other as a result of Yi-jin's increased workload and his task of reporting the September 11 attacks which slowly affects their relationship as he is no longer able to communicate with Hee-do. After initially traveling to New York City to temporarily cover the attacks, Yi-jin applies for a permanent reporter position in the city.
16	"Episode 16"; Transliteration: "Je-sip-yuk-hwe" (Korean: 제16회)	Jung Ji-hyun	Kwon Do-eun	April 3, 2022
Hee-do and Yi-jin painfully break up, as a result of Yi-jin's absences. They both make hateful comments while breaking up. They both immediately regret what they had said. While in the hospital after collapsing, Hee-do writes in her diary what she should have said to Yi-jin that day of their break-up. She loses the diary on the bus. The diary is sent to Yi-jin. The group eventually finds success in their respective pathways of life; Yi-jin is promoted to a news anchor, while Hee-do goes on to win two more gold medals before retiring in 2009. Yu-rim retires in 2007 and returns to South Korea and opens a fencing club. Seung-wan becomes a variety show producer after completing her university degree. At her father's funeral, Seung-wan meets Yi-hyun again and asks him for his phone number. Ji-woong becomes a fashion designer and marries Yu-rim. The timeline returns to 2021 where Min-chae is inspired by her mother's passion from her teenage years and tells Hee-do she decided to take up ballet again, and Hee-do, feeling impressed with her daughter's re-determination, begins to reminisce about her teenage years. Hee-do receives her lost diary twenty years late. The used bookstore owner had forgotten he had it. In the diary, Yi-jin had also written what he had wished he would have said during the break-up. In an epilogue scene shows someone unconfirmed answering a recovery account password question about "who was your first love"; the answer was "Na Hee-do".

== Production ==
=== Casting ===
On September 7, 2021, the main cast of the series was confirmed as Kim Tae-ri, Nam Joo-hyuk, Kim Ji-yeon, Choi Hyun-wook, and Lee Joo-myung. It is Kim Tae-ri's first appearance on the small screen after a hiatus of three years. She last starred in Mr. Sunshine in 2018.

=== Filming ===
Filming of the series began on September 7, 2021. The series is set in Ahyeon-dong, Mapo District, Seoul and is filmed in Jeonju, Seohak-dong, Jeonju Hanok Village, Jeonju National University of Education's dormitory alley, and the National Intangible Heritage Center.

==== COVID-19 infections ====
On March 2, 2022, it was confirmed that actress Kim Tae-ri had been infected with COVID-19 since February 26, 2022, causing filming to be halted, with filming expected to resume after she recovers. The broadcast continued as usual. On March 3, 2022, it was confirmed that actor Choi Hyun-wook had tested positive for COVID-19. Both Kim and Choi went into isolation in accordance with the guidelines of the Quarantine Authority.

=== Release ===
The series premiered on February 12, 2022, and aired every Saturday and Sunday at 21:10 (KST) on the South Korean television network tvN.

== Original soundtrack ==
Twenty-Five Twenty-One OST Special

Soundtrack album by Various Artist
- Released: 2022
- Genre: Soundtrack
- Languages: Korean; English
- Labels: YG Plus; Studio Maum C; Hwa&Dam Pictures

The album peaked on number 7 on weekly Gaon Album Chart and as of April 2022, 35,426 copies have been sold.

=== Part 1 ===
Released on February 13, 2022
No.	Title	Lyrics	Music	Artist	Length
1.	"Starlight" (스타라이트)	Oh Dong-jun	Oh Dong-jun	Taeil (NCT)	3:45
2.	"Starlight" (Inst.)		Oh Dong-jun		3:45
Total length:					7:30

=== Part 2 ===
Released on February 19, 2022
No.	Title	Lyrics	Music	Artist	Length
1.	"I'll Shine on You to Dazzle" (눈이 부시도록 너를 비춰줄게)	Black Frequency	Black Frequency	Bae Ki-sung	3:15
2.	"I'll Shine on You to Dazzle" (Inst.)		Black Frequency		3:15
Total length:					6:30

=== Part 3 ===
Released on February 20, 2022
No.	Title	Lyrics	Music	Artist	Length
1.	"Very, Slowly" (아주, 천천히)	Jayci yucca	PATEKO, Jayci yucca	BIBI	4:21
2.	"Very, Slowly" (Inst.)		PATEKO, Jayci yucca		4:21
Total length:					8:42

=== Part 4 ===
Released on February 26, 2022
No.	Title	Lyrics	Music	Artist	Length
1.	"Your Existence" (존재만으로)	MaO, Wonstein	Naiv	Wonstein	4:11
2.	"Your Existence" (Inst.)		Naiv		4:11
Total length:					8:22

=== Part 5 ===
Released on February 27, 2022
No.	Title	Lyrics	Music	Artist	Length
1.	"Go!"	Oh Dong-jun	Oh Dong-jun	DK (Seventeen)	3:30
2.	"Go!" (Inst.)		Oh Dong-jun		3:30
Total length:					7:00

=== Part 6 ===
Released on March 6, 2022
No.	Title	Lyrics	Music	Artist	Length
1.	"Stardust Love Song"	Yoon Young-jun	Yoon Young-jun	Jihyo (Twice)	4:11
2.	"Stardust Love Song" (Inst.)		Yoon Young-jun		4:11
Total length:					8:22

=== Part 7 ===
Released on March 13, 2022
No.	Title	Lyrics	Music	Artist	Length
1.	"With"	Noh Kyung-bo	Noh Kyung-bo	Kim Tae-ri, Nam Joo-hyuk, Bona (Kim Ji-yeon), Choi Hyun-wook, Lee Joo-myung	4:30
2.	"With" (Inst.)		Noh Kyung-bo		4:30
Total length:					9:00

=== Part 8 ===
Released on March 20, 2022
No.	Title	Lyrics	Music	Artist	Length
1.	"Free" (가보자)	Jung Gu-hyun, Aseul	Jung Gu-hyun	Xydo	3:46
2.	"Free" (Inst.)		Jung Gu-hyun		3:46
Total length:					7:32

=== Part 9 ===
Released on March 27, 2022
No.	Title	Lyrics	Music	Artist	Length
1.	"Your World" (너의 세상)	Lee In-young	Kang Hyu-nmin, WYOONG	Seol Ho-seung (SURL)	3:27
2.	"Your World" (Inst.)		Kang Hyun-min, WYOONG		3:27
Total length:					6:54

=== Chart performance ===
Title	Year	Peak chart position		Remarks
Title	Year	KOR		Remarks
Title	Year	Gaon	Hot	Remarks
"Starlight" (Taeil)	2022	30	28	Part 1
"Very, Slowly" (아주, 천천히) (BIBI)	2022	48	43	Part 3
"Your Existence" (존재만으로) (Wonstein)	2022	16	19	Part 4
"Go!" (DK)	2022	117	88	Part 5
"Stardust Love Song" (Jihyo)	2022	103	71	Part 6
"With" (Main cast)	2022	40	54	Part 7
"Free" (Xydo)	2022	101	93	Part 8

== Reception ==
=== Rankings and reviews ===
During the eight weeks of broadcast, Twenty-Five Twenty-One, Kim Tae-ri and Nam Joo-hyuk maintained the top spots in drama and actors popularity rankings conducted by Good Data Corporation. The series also placed first in viewership ratings for all its 16 episodes, in both the Metropolitan Area and nationwide. Additionally, it featured on Netflix's "Global Top 10" (non-English TV category), a weekly list of the most-watched international Netflix shows, for 10 consecutive weeks (as of the week ending May 1, 2022). The drama's success was attributed to its "retro-sentimental" vibe that was presented through the use of props, fashion, and locations that were able to invoke nostalgia to the generation that experienced the 1990s. It was also stated that it had succeeded in gaining the empathy and sympathy of viewers as it depicts the struggles of the IMF period in Korea, which viewers connected with the ongoing COVID-19 pandemic.

Pierce Conran, in his review for the South China Morning Post, stated that the show had "an appealing theme, a story that is well told, great acting and clever staging and editing". Rhian Daly of NME described the show as "a nostalgic dive into the memories of youth and the value of dreams." NME ranked it first on the list of best Korean drama of 2022. Time and Teen Vogue included it in their list of the best Korean dramas of 2022.

=== Cultural impact ===
The popularity of the series led to the elevated recognition for actress Kim Tae-ri, who was stated to have emerged as the new "Nation's First Love." BTS' Jungkook shared that he watched it and recommended it to his fans. Actor Gong Yoo also revealed that he watched the series Twenty-Five Twenty-One when he recommended his fans to watch My Liberation Notes.

Following the drama's conclusion, the Ministry of Culture, Sports and Tourism launched a travel product (itineraries alongside various accommodation and rental vouchers) touring the filming locations of the series, which includes the Jeonju Hanok Village, locations surrounding the Seohakdong Art Village, and the Hanbyeokgul Tunnel where the drama was shot. Retail company 7-Eleven reported that sales of its bakery brand Breadum had increased three-fold following the appearance of its pastry products on the show. The company then announced on April 7 that Breadum has launched two additional products in collaboration with the drama.

Investment company Daehan Securities has credited the success and high topicality of Twenty-Five Twenty-One alongside the recovery of television commercials for the 12% sales growth of CJ ENM, the parent company of broadcast channel tvN, during the first quarter of 2022. With 2022 marking the renewed popularity of retro style in South Korea, Twenty-Five Twenty-One was stated to have greatly contributed to the "retro craze".

Following the appearance of the popular manhwa Full House in the show, its comic book set saw a sales growth of 1,044% in February 2022 (when the series started airing) which was followed by a 24.3% sales increase in March 2022 compared to the previous month. In the Philippines, it was reported that the drama, with part of its plotline focused on fencing, led to an increased interest in the sport. The show has also been credited for contributing to an increase in the number of female protagonists in Korean dramas.

=== Criticism ===
Despite its popularity and commercial success, Twenty-Five Twenty-One became subject to a few controversies. Netizens debated about the series' main plot line which involves romance between a legal adult and a character that is initially introduced as a minor, although a poll conducted on website Nate came out with 77% of over 3,000 respondents stating that there is no problem with the drama's love line. The drama also faced criticism for a scene in its 15th episode portraying a news coverage of the September 11 attacks, depicting the female lead smiling at her boyfriend giving live coverage of the incident, which some viewers deemed "inappropriate".

=== Philanthropy ===
On August 19, 2022, lead actors Kim Tae-ri, Nam Joo-hyuk, Kim Ji-yeon, Choi Hyun-wook and Lee Joo-myung donated all proceeds made from the OST (₩50 million) to the Hope Bridge Korea Disaster Relief Association to help those affected by the 2022 South Korean floods.

== Viewership ==
Twenty-Five Twenty-One : South Korea viewers per episode (millions)

Season	Episode number																Average
Season	1	2	3	4	5	6	7	8	9	10	11	12	13	14	15	16	Average
1	1.537	2.065	1.999	2.165	1.988	2.509	2.620	2.857	2.870	2.887	2.919	2.828	2.796	2.905	2.639	3.047	2.539

Source: Audience measurement performed nationwide by Nielsen Korea

Average TV viewership ratings
Ep.	Original broadcast date	Average audience share (Nielsen Korea)	
Ep.	Original broadcast date	Nationwide	Seoul
1	February 12, 2022	6.370% (1st)	7.799% (1st)
2	February 13, 2022	8.010% (1st)	8.867% (1st)
3	February 19, 2022	8.182% (1st)	8.981% (1st)
4	February 20, 2022	8.787% (1st)	9.972% (1st)
5	February 26, 2022	7.956% (1st)	8.960% (1st)
6	February 27, 2022	9.817% (1st)	11.065% (1st)
7	March 5, 2022	9.718% (1st)	10.380% (1st)
8	March 6, 2022	10.900% (1st)	11.734% (1st)
9	March 12, 2022	10.662% (1st)	12.043% (1st)
10	March 13, 2022	10.879% (1st)	12.660% (1st)
11	March 19, 2022	10.887% (1st)	12.410% (1st)
12	March 20, 2022	10.675% (1st)	12.528% (1st)
13	March 26, 2022	9.927% (1st)	11.001% (1st)
14	March 27, 2022	10.308% (1st)	11.451% (1st)
15	April 2, 2022	9.592% (1st)	10.302% (1st)
16	April 3, 2022	11.513% (1st)	12.636% (1st)
Average		9.636%	10.799%
In the table above, the blue numbers represent the lowest ratings and the red numbers represent the highest ratings.; This drama aired on a cable channel/pay TV which normally has a relatively smaller audience compared to free-to-air TV/public broadcasters (KBS, SBS, MBC and EBS).

== Accolades ==
=== Awards and nominations ===
Award ceremony	Year	Category	Nominee	Result	Ref.
APAN Star Awards	2022	Top Excellence Award, Actress in a Miniseries	Kim Tae-ri	Nominated	
APAN Star Awards	2022	Best New Actor	Choi Hyun-wook	Nominated	
APAN Star Awards	2022	Best Original Soundtrack	DK (Seventeen) — "Go!"	Nominated	
APAN Star Awards	2022	Best Original Soundtrack	Jihyo (Twice) — "Stardust Love Song"	Nominated	
APAN Star Awards	2022	Best Original Soundtrack	Taeil (NCT) — "Starlight"	Nominated	
APAN Star Awards	2022	Popularity Star Award, actress	Kim Tae-ri	Nominated	
Asian Academy Creative Awards	2022	Best Drama Series	Twenty-Five Twenty-One	Won	
Asia Contents Awards	2022	New Comer – Actor	Choi Hyun-wook	Nominated	
Baeksang Arts Awards	2022	Best Drama	Twenty-Five Twenty-One	Nominated	
Baeksang Arts Awards	2022	Best Actress	Kim Tae-ri	Won	
Baeksang Arts Awards	2022	Most Popular Actress	Kim Tae-ri	Won	
Baeksang Arts Awards	2022	Best New Actor	Choi Hyun-wook	Nominated	
Kinolights Awards	2022	Korean Drama of the Year	Twenty-Five Twenty-One	3rd	
Kinolights Awards	2022	Korean Actress of the Year	Kim Tae-ri	3rd	
Korea Drama Awards	2022	Grand Prize (Daesang)	Kim Tae-ri	Nominated	
Korea Drama Awards	2022	Best Drama	Twenty-Five Twenty-One	Nominated	
Korea Drama Awards	2022	Best Director	Jung Ji-hyun	Nominated	
Korea Drama Awards	2022	Best New Actress	Kim Ji-yeon	Won	
Korea Culture and Entertainment Awards	2022	Excellence Award, actress	Kim Ji-yeon	Won	

=== Listicles ===
Name of publisher, year listed, name of listicle, and placement
Publisher	Year	Listicle	Placement	Ref.
Entertainment Weekly	2025	The 21 best Korean shows on Netflix to watch now	Top 1	
