= Curtain Up, Class! =

South Korean television show

- Promotional poster
- Hangul: 방과후 태리쌤
- RR: Banggwahu Taeri ssaem
- MR: Panggwahu T'aeri ssaem
- Genre: Youth; Reality show
- Written by: Jang Yoon-hee
- Directed by: Park Ji-ye; Hwang Seul-woo
- Starring: Kim Tae-ri; Choi Hyun-wook; Kangnam; Code Kunst
- Country of origin: South Korea
- Original language: Korean
- No. of seasons: 1
- No. of episodes: 10

Production
- Executive producer: Guk Min-jeong
- Production location: South Korea
- Running time: 90 minutes
- Production companies: CJ ENM Studios; Studio Slam; Management MMM

Original release
- Network: tvN
- Release: February 22 – April 26, 2026

Curtain Up, Class! (Korean: 방과후 태리쌤) is a South Korean television program starring Kim Tae-ri and Choi Hyun-wook, who take on the role of acting teachers for a children's theater class for the first time, alongside singers Kangnam and Code Kunst.

The show aired every Sunday at 17:50 (KST) from February 22 to April 26, 2026 on tvN Channel. It is available for streaming outside South Korea on Viu.

== Overview ==
The program follows actors Kim Tae-ri and Choi Hyun-wook and singers Kangnam and Code Kunst as they become first-time acting teachers at a school facing closure. Tasked with leading a theater class, they guide students with no prior acting experience in preparing a stage play for the school festival while overcoming the challenges of learning and teaching together.

== Cast ==
=== Main ===
- Kim Tae-ri

In charge of directing, adapting, and instructing! She’s the leader of the drama club and an all-around rookie teacher who devotes herself to the play.

- Choi Hyun-wook

At school, he leads the chants and dance routines, and at home, he’s in charge of meals and assistance. He is the youngest and the friendliest teacher in the drama club.

- Kangnam

He’s the eldest brother and their biggest supporter, handling everything from costumes and props to promotions, and even providing emotional support to both the kids and the teachers.

- Code Kunst

The sound director with a very sophisticated sensibility. He’s in charge of composing the music for the play and even recording the sound effects, so he never misses even the smallest sound.

=== Guest ===
- Ahn Sung-jae

== Production ==
=== Development ===
The show is produced by CJ ENM Studios and Studio Slam, in partnership with Kim Tae-ri's agency Management MMM.

=== Filming ===
Filming took place at Yongheung Elementary School, in Mungyeong, North Gyeongsang Province.

According to Choi Hyun-wook's interview, the show's filming took two weeks.

== Discography ==
The soundtrack for the show was released in five parts between March 1 and March 22, 2026. The first part, released on March 1, features "apple scent" Produced by Code Kunst and performed by Kim Tae-ri. Part 2, released on March 8, titled "Let's Just Go!", performed by Kim Tae-ri alongside Seok Matthew, and Park Gun-wook from Zerobaseone. Part 3 followed on March 9 with "Young & Naive", sung by Mingginyu. Part 4 was released on March 15, titled "Happened" by Isaac Hong. The fifth and final part was released on March 22, titled "Best Dance", performed by DK. Each soundtrack release also included an instrumental version of its title track.

=== Part 1 ===
Released on March 1, 2026
No.	Title	Lyrics	Music	Artist	Length
1.	"apple scent (Prod. Code Kunst)"	g0nny; Code Kunst	g0nny; Code Kunst; Pick!	Kim Tae-ri	3:03
2.	"apple scent (Prod. Code Kunst)" (Inst.)		g0nny; Code Kunst; Pick!		3:03
Total length:					6:06

=== Part 2 ===
Released on March 8, 2026
No.	Title	Lyrics	Music	Artist	Length
1.	"Let's Just Go!" (오늘은 그냥 GO!)	Lee Si-woo; Lee Eun-seok	Lee Si-woo; Lee Eun-seok	Seok Matthew; Kim Tae-ri; Park Gun-wook	3:06
2.	"Let's Just Go!" (오늘은 그냥 GO! (Inst.))		Lee Si-woo; Lee Eun-seok		3:06
Total length:					6:12

=== Part 3 ===
Released on March 9, 2026
No.	Title	Lyrics	Music	Artist	Length
1.	"Young & Naive"	Jayins	Jayins; SiBi	Mingginyu	3:20
2.	"Young & Naive" (Inst.)		Jayins; SiBi		3:20
Total length:					6:40

=== Part 4 ===
Released on March 15, 2026
No.	Title	Lyrics	Music	Artist	Length
1.	"Happened"	PERCENT	PERCENT	Isaac Hong	3:28
2.	"Happened" (Inst.)		PERCENT		3:28
Total length:					6:56

=== Part 5 ===
Released on March 22, 2026
No.	Title	Lyrics	Music	Artist	Length
1.	"Best Dance" (명장면)	Lee Ki-hwan; KIPLE	Lee Ki-hwan; KIPLE; CONA	DK	3:50
2.	"Best Dance" (명장면 (Inst.))		Lee Ki-hwan; CONA		3:50
Total length:					7:40

== Ratings ==
Ep.	Original broadcast date	Average audience share (Nielsen Korea)	
Ep.	Original broadcast date	Nationwide	Seoul
1	February 22, 2026	1.464%	1.350%
2	March 1, 2026	1.000%	—
3	March 8, 2026	1.300%	1.832%
4	March 15, 2026	0.900%	—
5	March 22, 2026	1.000%	—
6	March 29, 2026	0.700%	—
7	April 5, 2026	0.600%	—
8	April 12, 2026	0.700%	—
9	April 19, 2026	0.700%	—
10	April 26, 2026	0.700%	—
Average		0.906%	1.591%
In the table above, the blue numbers represent the lowest ratings and the red numbers represent the highest ratings.; This show airs on a cable channel/pay TV which normally has a relatively smaller audience compared to free-to-air TV/public broadcasters (KBS, SBS, MBC & EBS).
