= Delightfully Deceitful =

2023 South Korean television series

- Promotional poster
- Hangul: 이로운 사기
- Lit.: Beneficial Fraud
- RR: Iroun sagi
- MR: Iroun sagi
- Genre: Revenge; Crime; Comedy
- Developed by: Studio Dragon (planning)
- Written by: Han Woo-joo
- Directed by: Lee Soo-hyun
- Starring: Chun Woo-hee; Kim Dong-wook
- Music by: Kim Joon-seok; Jeong Se-rin
- Country of origin: South Korea
- Original language: Korean
- No. of episodes: 16

Production
- Executive producers: Soo Jae-hyeon; Park Eun-kyung
- Producers: Kim gyeo-re; Lee Min-ae
- Running time: 70 minutes
- Production company: Next Scene

Original release
- Network: tvN
- Release: May 29 – July 18, 2023

Delightfully Deceitful (Korean: 이로운 사기) is a 2023 South Korean television series directed by Lee Soo-hyun, and starring Chun Woo-hee and Kim Dong-wook. It aired on tvN from May 29 to July 18, 2023, every Monday and Tuesday at 20:50 (KST) for 16 episodes. It is also available for streaming on TVING in South Korea, on U-Next in Japan and on Viu in selected regions.

== Synopsis ==
Delightfully Deceitful tells the story of a man and a woman with completely different temperaments meeting and taking revenge together toward one goal.

== Cast ==
=== Main ===
- Chun Woo-hee as Lee Ro-woom: a compassionate con artist who cannot empathize who served 10 years in prison wrongfully convicted of her parents' murder.
- Kim Dong-wook as Han Moo-young: a passionate and excessively-empathetic lawyer who is also Lee Ro-woom's attorney.
  - Kim Yoon-woo as young Han Moo-young
- Yoon Park as Go Yo-han: a misguided problematic probation officer who protects and observes Ro-woom.
- Park So-jin as Mo Jae-in: a stern psychiatrist who has been treating Moo-young.

=== Supporting ===
==== Kids ====
- Lee Yeon as Jung Da-jeong: a hacker with 20 years of experience, who runs a comic book store.
- Yoo Hee-je as Na-sa / Na Su-ho: an all-around engineer who runs the Nasaka Center.
- Hong Seung-beom as Ring-go / Park Hae-dong: a call center who is the owner of To-Do Call Center.
- Lee Gyeong-min as Yoo-il: To-Do Call Center's staff.
- Kim Myung-chan as Yoo-neung: To-Do Call Center's staff.

==== People around Han Moo-young ====
- Choi Young-joon as Ryu Jae-hyeok: a prosecutor and Moo-young's senior.
- Yoon Byung-hee as Woo Young-gi: a reporter for Moran Ilbo.
- Lee Hae-young as Kang Kyung-ho: Moo-young's mentor and role model.
- Kim Hak-sun as Han Jae-suk: Moo-young's father.
- Kim Jung-young as Park Ja-young: Moo-young's mother.

==== Law Firm ====
- Lee Chang-hoon as Park Gyu: a lawyer and CEO of Park & Q Law Firm.
- Cha Yong-hak as Cho Jae-hun: a lawyer of Park & Q Law Firm.
- Yun Seol as Park In-young: a manager of Park & Q Law Firm.

==== Red Eye ====
- Kim Tae-hoon as Jay / Chairman
1. Jay: head of the bodyguard at Navis Wellbeing.
2. Chairman: a monster who turned Ro-woom and Kid's lives into hell for his own purposes.
- Lee Tae-ran as Jang Kyung-ja: CEO of Navis Wellbeing.
- Park Wan-kyu as Ye Chung-sik: a former loan shark and now homeless.
- Park Ji-il as Shin Gi-ho: an old Red Eye executive who used to be a university professor.
- Park Jung-hak as Ahn Chae-hong: Red Eye's last chairman and Kyung-ja's husband.
- Son In-yong as Messenger: the closest aide who delivers the president's message and recruits ghosts to deal with the crimes ordered by the president.
- TBA as Banker: a bank teller who moves the chairman's money.
- Kim Jong-tae as Ma Kang-su: a rare breed of con artist, dressed in head-to-toe luxury, but with raw violence and a raw lust for money running through his veins.

==== People we call friends ====
- Jang Young-nam as Seo Gye-suk: Myung-hoon's biological mother. Due to debt, she asked her friend to adopt her son.
- Nam Do-yoon as Yoo Myung-hoon: Gye-suk's biological son. He died in a mysterious accident while on vacation with his adoptive parents.
- Ahn Nae-sang as Yeon Tae-hun: a Navis Wellbeing sniper who wants to expose the true face of Navis Wellbeing.
- Kwon Han-sol as Yeon Ho-jeong: a newcomer to the workforce who turned to pyramid schemes to pay for her mother's medical bills.

=== Others ===
- Jo Hyun-woo as Hong Chang-ki: a prisoner in prison for fraud.
- Seo Dong-gap as Tazza: a defendant defended by Moo-yeong.

=== Special appearances ===
- Kim Woo-seok as client
- Park Ji-ah as Prisoner
- Lee Joo-won as Myung-hoon's adoptive parents.
- Yoo Ji-yeon as an adoptive mother.
- Moon Ga-young as Min Kang-yoon

== Production ==
Delightfully Deceitful was written by Han Woo-joo, who won the "Honorable Mention Award" in the 2nd Studio Dragon Drama Script Contest in 2020. Lee Soo-hyun, who previously helmed My Dearest Nemesis, Shooting Stars and The Witch's Diner for Studio Dragon, was attached to direct. The series was planned and created by Studio Dragon and produced by its subsidiary Next Scene.

=== Casting ===
Actor Song Duk-ho was initially confirmed to appear in the series, but he stepped down following a corruption issue related to his military service. On February 21, 2023, it was reported that actor Yoo Hee-je was being considered to take over Song Duk-ho's role.

== Viewership ==
Delightfully Deceitful : South Korea viewers per episode (thousands)

Season	Episode number																Average
Season	1	2	3	4	5	6	7	8	9	10	11	12	13	14	15	16	Average
1	1033	715	786	1007	947	863	728	689	806	796	609	744	553	684	737	987	772

Source: Audience measurement performed nationwide by Nielsen Korea.

Average TV viewership ratings
Ep.	Original broadcast date	Average audience share (Nielsen Korea)	
Ep.	Original broadcast date	Nationwide	Seoul
1	May 29, 2023	4.551% (1st)	5.028% (1st)
2	May 30, 2023	3.464% (1st)	3.679% (2nd)
3	June 5, 2023	3.507% (1st)	3.977% (1st)
4	June 6, 2023	4.316% (1st)	5.063% (1st)
5	June 12, 2023	4.458% (1st)	5.221% (1st)
6	June 13, 2023	4.033% (1st)	4.514% (1st)
7	June 19, 2023	3.518% (1st)	3.942% (1st)
8	June 20, 2023	3.291% (2nd)	3.162% (2nd)
9	June 26, 2023	4.112% (1st)	4.933% (1st)
10	June 27, 2023	3.667% (1st)	3.401% (2nd)
11	July 3, 2023	3.022% (1st)	3.248% (1st)
12	July 4, 2023	3.421% (2nd)	3.479% (2nd)
13	July 10, 2023	2.979% (1st)	3.601% (1st)
14	July 11, 2023	3.676% (1st)	3.890% (1st)
15	July 17, 2023	3.469% (1st)	4.076% (1st)
16	July 18, 2023	4.514% (1st)	4.733% (1st)
Average		3.750%	4.122%
In the table above, the blue numbers represent the lowest ratings and the red numbers represent the highest ratings.; This series aired on a cable channel/pay TV which normally has a relatively smaller audience compared to free-to-air TV/public broadcasters (KBS, SBS, MBC and EBS).

== Awards and nominations ==
Name of the award ceremony, year presented, category, nominee of the award, and the result of the nomination
Award ceremony	Year	Category	Nominee / Work	Result	Ref.
Korea Drama Awards	2023	Best New Actress	Lee Yeon	Won	
