= Design (disambiguation) =

Design is the creation of a plan or specification for the construction of an object or a system.

Design or The Design may also refer to:

== Science and mathematics ==
- Block design
- Combinatorial design
- Design of experiments
- Engineering design process
- Randomized block design, in statistics

== Entertainment ==
- Design (band), a 1970s British vocal group
- Design, a record label founded by Marco Carola
- The Design (album)
- The Design (professional wrestling)

== Other uses ==
- Communication design
- Fashion design
- Game design
- Graphic design
- Interior design
- Scenic design

== See also ==
- Designs (manga), a Japanese manga series by Daisuke Igarashi
- Designer (disambiguation)
- By Design (disambiguation)
- Interior Design (disambiguation)
- Design methods
