= Children of the Sea =

Children of the Sea may refer to:

- "Children of the Sea" (song), a 1980 song by Black Sabbath
- Children of the Sea (manga), a manga series by Daisuke Igarashi
  - Children of the Sea (film), a film based on the manga
- The Nigger of the 'Narcissus', a 1897 novella by Joseph Conrad also known as The Children of the Sea
- Children of the Sea (painting), an 1872 oil-on-canvas painting by Dutch artist Jozef Israëls.
