= The Family Game (TV series) =

- Also known as: Kazoku Game
- 家族ゲーム
- Genre: Mystery; Psychological; Life; School; Family
- Directed by: Yuichi Sato; Kazuyuki Iwata
- Starring: Sho Sakurai; Ryunosuke Kamiki; Honami Suzuki; Seishuu Uragami; Itsuji Itao; Shiori Kutsuna
- Ending theme: Endless Game by Arashi
- Country of origin: Japan
- Original language: Japanese
- No. of episodes: 10

Production
- Producers: Inada Hideki; Kobayashi Hiroshi
- Running time: 46 Min
- Production company: Kyodo Television

Original release
- Network: FNS (Fuji TV)
- Release: April 17 – June 19, 2013

The Family Game (家族ゲーム, Kazoku Gēmu), also known as Kazoku Game, is a Japanese television drama based on the award-winning novel of the same name by Yohei Honma, as well as an adaptation of its filmed version. The drama is directed by Yuichi Sato and Kazuyuki Iwata and was broadcast on Fuji TV. It aired from April 17 until June 19, 2013.

The drama was a critical and commercial success and received several awards.

== Synopsis ==
Kazushige Numata (Itsuji Itao) and his wife Kayoko (Honami Suzuki) have two sons. The elder son, Shinichi (Ryunosuke Kamiki), is considered an honor student, but the second son, Shigeyuki (Seishuu Uragami), is an underachiever, who might even fail to enter high school. To make matters worse, Shigeyuki has stopped going to school. His parents, worried about Shigeyuki, find an advertisement for a private tutor on the internet. They contact and then meet Koya Yoshimoto (Sho Sakurai), who becomes Shigeyuki's tutor. During their meeting, both parties lay out one condition to work with each other. The father stipulates that Shigeyuki must go back to school within a week or Yoshimoto will be fired. Meanwhile, Yoshimoto stipulates that the parents must not interfere with his work. Yoshimoto's extraordinary teaching methods then influence not only Shigeyuki, but also his entire family.

== Cast ==
- Sho Sakurai as Koya Yoshimoto / Yuudai Tago
- Ryunosuke Kamiki as Shinichi Numata
- Honami Suzuki as Kayoko Numata
- Seishuu Uragami as Shigeyuki Numata
- Itsuji Itao as Kazushige Numata
- Shioli Kutsuna as Maika Asami / Maki Tachibana

== Ratings ==
In the table below, the blue number represents the lowest ratings and the red number represents the highest ratings.

Episode	Original broadcast date	Average audience share
Episode	Original broadcast date	Kanto Region
1	April 17, 2013	12.0%
2	April 24, 2013	13.7%
3	May 1, 2013	11.1%
4	May 8, 2013	12.2%
5	May 15, 2013	12.4%
6	May 22, 2013	12.9%
7	May 29, 2013	13.6%
8	June 5, 2013	12.6%
9	June 12, 2013	12.4%
10	June 19, 2013	16.7%
Average		13.0%

== Reception ==
The drama received positive reviews from critics. Philip Brasor from Japan Times compared the drama to the film adaptation. He said that "it exaggerates the elements that made the movie (The Family Game 2013) shocking. The characters aren’t just deluded, they’re twisted." Brasor particularly praised Sho Sakurai's portrayal of Yoshimoto, in which he said that "[Yūsaku] Matsuda’s tutor was an antisocial loser with a streak of cruelty. Sakurai’s is a full-blown sociopath. Matsuda struck Shigeyuki just to get a rise out of him. Sakurai not only strikes Shigeyuki (Seishuu Uragami), he practically destroys the Numata home on a weekly basis, cackling all the while like the Wicked Witch of the West. Matsuda’s power over the Numata household came from the force of his personality. Sakurai’s power is of the purely calculating kind, as is the writing in general....Like Matsuda’s tutor, Sakurai uses gamesmanship instead of pedagogy to get results, but his methodology is more sadistic."

Sho Sakurai's acting reportedly made fans find it "too disturbing to watch". It was dubbed as 2013's Biggest Drama Surprise by critics, and Sakurai was given a number of awards.

== Awards and nominations ==
Year	Award	Category	Nominated work	Result
2013	17th Nikkan Sports Drama Grand Prix (Spring)	Best Drama	The Family Game	Won
2013	17th Nikkan Sports Drama Grand Prix (Spring)	Best Actor	Sho Sakurai	Won
2013	17th Nikkan Sports Drama Grand Prix (Spring)	Best Supporting Actor	Ryunosuke Kamiki	Won
2013	17th Nikkan Sports Drama Grand Prix (Spring)	Best Supporting Actress	Honami Suzuki	Won
2013	77th Television Drama Academy Awards	Best Drama	The Family Game	Won
2013	77th Television Drama Academy Awards	Best Actor	Sho Sakurai	Won
2013	77th Television Drama Academy Awards	Best Supporting Actor	Ryunosuke Kamiki	Won
2013	77th Television Drama Academy Awards	Best Supporting Actor	Seishuu Uragami	Nominated
2013	77th Television Drama Academy Awards	Best Supporting Actress	Honami Suzuki	Nominated
2013	77th Television Drama Academy Awards	Best Screenwriter	Muto Shogo	Won
2013	77th Television Drama Academy Awards	Best Director	Yuichi Sato	Won
2013	77th Television Drama Academy Awards	Best Theme song	Endless Game by Arashi	Won
2014	23rd TV Life Annual Drama Awards	Best Drama	The Family Game	Won
2014	23rd TV Life Annual Drama Awards	Best Lead Actor	Sakurai Sho	Won
2014	23rd TV Life Annual Drama Awards	Best Supporting Actor	Ryunosuke Kamiki	Won
2014	23rd TV Life Annual Drama Awards	Best Supporting Actress	Honami Suzuki	Won
2014	23rd TV Life Annual Drama Awards	Best Theme Song	Endless Game by Arashi	Won
