= Character design =

Character design may refer to:

- Character creation, the process of defining a player character in a role-playing game
- Characterization, the representation of characters in narrative and dramatic works
- Model sheet, a document used to help standardize the appearance, poses, and gestures of a character in arts

== See also ==
- Character (disambiguation)
- Design (disambiguation)
