= Children of the Sea (manga) =

Japanese manga series

- First tankōbon volume cover

海獣の子供 (Kaijū no Kodomo)
- Genre: Drama; Mystery; Supernatural
- Manga
- Written by: Daisuke Igarashi
- Published by: Shogakukan
- English publisher: NA: Viz Media
- Imprint: Ikki Comix
- Magazine: Monthly Ikki
- English magazine: NA: SigIkki.com
- Original run: December 24, 2005 – September 24, 2011
- Volumes: 5
- Anime film
- Children of the Sea (2019)
- icon

Children of the Sea (Japanese: 海獣の子供, Hepburn: Kaijū no Kodomo; lit. 'Marine Mammal Children') is a Japanese manga series written and illustrated by Daisuke Igarashi. It was serialized in Shōgakukan's seinen manga magazine Monthly Ikki from December 2005 to September 2011. Shōgakukan has collected the series into five tankōbon volumes published between July 2007 and July 2012. The manga is licensed in North America by Viz Media, who serialized it online at SigIkki.com and released the five tankōbon volumes from July 2009 to June 2013.

An anime film adaptation by Studio 4 °C premiered in May 2019 in Japan.

In 2009, Children of the Sea was awarded an Excellence Prize at the 13th Japan Media Arts Festival.

== Plot ==
On the first day of summer vacation, Ruka Azumi deliberately injures a playmate who had tripped her up. Excluded from the club for all the holidays, she decides to leave for Tokyo for a day. As night falls, she meets Umi, a strange boy raised by dugongs who dives and disappears into the murky waters of Tokyo Port. She finds him a few days later, requisitioned by his oceanographer father, to work in the aquarium he takes care of. But Umi is no longer alone. He is accompanied by Sora, who also has supernatural aquatic gifts.

== Characters ==
Ruka Azumi (安海琉花, Azumi Ruka)
Voiced by: Mana Ashida (Japanese); Anjali Gauld (English)
Umi (海)
Voiced by: Hiiro Ishibashi (Japanese); Lynden Prosser (English)
Sora (空)
Voiced by: Seishū Uragami (Japanese); Benjamin Niewoodr (English)
Anglade (アングラード, Angurādo)
Voiced by: Win Morisaki (Japanese); Beau Bridgland (English)
Masaaki Azumi (安海正明, Azumi Masaaki)
Voiced by: Goro Inagaki (Japanese); Marc Thompson (English)
Kanako Azumi (安海加奈子, Kanako Azumi)
Voiced by: Yu Aoi (Japanese); Karen Strassman (English)
Sensei (先生)
Voiced by: Tohru Watanabe (Japanese); Wally Wingert (English)
Jim (ジム, Jimu)
Voiced by: Min Tanaka (Japanese); Michael Sorich (English)
Dede (デデ)
Voiced by: Sumiko Fuji (Japanese); Denise Lee (English)

== Development ==
The concept originated from artist Daisuke Igarashi's interest in marine life and his habit of collecting field guides on marine animals. Initially titled Fish Girl, the story was inspired by mermaid mythology and the natural behavior of dugongs, which led Igarashi to imagine children raised by marine creatures. Igarashi sought to balance imaginative storytelling with scientific accuracy, consulting marine mammal researcher Yūko Tajima for factual details, such as the anatomy of sperm whales. Despite being published in a seinen manga magazine, the series was created with a female readership in mind.

== Media ==
=== Manga ===
Children of the Sea, written and illustrated by Daisuke Igarashi, was serialized in Shōgakukan's seinen magazine Monthly Ikki from December 24, 2005, to September 24, 2011. Shōgakukan compiled its chapters into five tankōbon volumes, released from July 30, 2007, to July 30, 2012.

The manga is licensed in North America by Viz Media, who serialized it online at SigIkki.com and released the five tankōbon volumes from July 21, 2009, to June 18, 2013.

==== Volumes ====
No.	Original release date	Original ISBN	English release date	English ISBN
1	July 30, 2007	978-4-091-88368-1	July 21, 2009	978-1-4215-2914-1
01. "Ruka" (琉花); 02. "The Day of Thunder" (神鳴りの日); 03. "Hitodama" (人魂); 04. "Marine Mammals"; 05. "Patterns" (図様); 06. "Ghost of the Sea" (海の幽霊); 07. "Chair" (椅子); 08. "The Realm of the Sea" (水界)
2	July 30, 2007	978-4-091-88369-8	December 15, 2009	978-1-4215-2919-6
09. "Isana"; 10. "A Strong Wind at Sea"; 11. "Beyond the Tide"; 12. "Falling Rain Collecting in Pools"; 13. "Soaked Children"; 14. "Rakshasa"; 15. "The Last Day of the Month"; 16. "Takeoff"
3	July 30, 2008	978-4-091-88422-0	June 15, 2010	978-1-4215-2920-2
17. "Kuroshio Current"; 18. "Far Out at Sea"; 19. "Mirage"; 20. "Dugong"; 21. "Gondwana"; 22. "Ripples in the Wave"; 23. "Trap"; 24. "Internal Organs"; 25. "Sea Border"
4	July 30, 2009	978-4-091-88470-1	December 21, 2010	978-1-4215-3541-8
26. "Marine Animals"; 27. "Pierced Body"; 28. "Muddied Waters"; 29. "Sea of the Universe"; 30. "Pregnancy"; 31. "Crucible"; 32. "Interception"; 33. "Preparation"; 34. "Venus"; 35. "Water Demon"
5	July 30, 2012	978-4-091-88590-6	June 18, 2013	978-1-4215-3848-8
36. "Eyelids"; 37. "Birth Rite I"; 38. "Birth Rite II"; 39. "Birth Rite III"; 40. "Birth Rite IV"; 41. "Birth Rite V"; 42. "Iruka"

=== Film ===
A Japanese animated film adaptation of the manga was announced by Studio 4 °C on July 16, 2018. The film is directed by Ayumu Watanabe, with Kenichi Konishi as character designer, chief supervising animator and unit director and music by Joe Hisaishi. It is produced by Eiko Tanaka. The theme song, "Umi no Yūrei" (海の幽霊; lit. 'Ghost(s) of the Sea'), is written and performed by Kenshi Yonezu.

The film had its world premiere on May 19, 2019 and was released in Japan on June 7, 2019.

== Reception ==
Children of the Sea was nominated for the 12th and 13th Osamu Tezuka Cultural Prize in 2008 and 2009, respectively. Daisuke Igarashi was awarded a Japan Cartoonists Association Awards excellence award for drawing Children of the Sea in 2009. Children of the Sea was the recipient of an Excellence Prize in the Manga Division at the 13th Japan Media Arts Festival in 2009.

About.com's Deb Aoki commends the manga for its "vibrant, detailed artwork that takes its inspiration from nature, real people and real places" but criticizes the manga for its slow plot which "picks up the pace after a few chapters". PopCultureShock's Sam Kusek comments on the interactions between the main characters, saying, "[Umi, Sora and Ruka] all share something in common, the fact that they are outsiders from the norm. Ruka is not your normal girl. As athletic as she is, her attitude and aggression towards her teammates leave her high and dry for the summer. Consistently throughout the book, people are badmouthing her as she passes them on the street. Umi and Sora are obviously outsiders due to their extreme circumstances, wearing large robes to cover a majority of their skin and having to constantly bathe in water. Sora especially has a frail constitution, spending most of the book in and out of a hospital. All three are young children, and that is shown throughout the book, but they also have a unique sense of maturity that sets them apart not only from other children but most adults."

Anime News Network's Carlo Santos commends the manga for its "subtle, seamless storytelling and first-class artistry combine to form a fascinating tale of the sea" but criticizes it for "mundane events and superfluous scenes sometimes slow down the plot". ICv2's Steve Bennett commends the manga for "the art is rich with photorealistic details which help to give the fantasy a solid grounding in reality, and has strong, emotionally honest characters which should make this young adult fantasy appeal to both fans of epic fantasy and contemporary teen dramas." Coolstreak Comics' Leroy Douresseaux comments that he is reminded of the "1980s ecological sci-fi comic book, The Puma Blues" when reading the manga. He also commends on Igarashi's "earthy art, with its busy line work and crosshatching and unsophisticated figure drawing, grounds this series in reality, which makes the moments of enchantment all the more breathtaking." He also recommends the manga to those who liked Inio Asano's Solanin.
