= Akira Tachibana =

Akira Tachibana may refer to:

- Akira Tachibana, a character in the manga series After the Rain
- Akira Tachibana (Symphogear), a character in the anime series Symphogear
