= Kowloon Generic Romance =

Japanese manga series by Jun Mayuzuki

- First tankōbon volume cover, featuring Reiko Kujirai

九龍ジェネリックロマンス (Kūron Jenerikku Romansu)
- Genre: Mystery; Romance; Science fiction
- Manga
- Written by: Jun Mayuzuki
- Published by: Shueisha
- English publisher: NA: Yen Press
- Imprint: Young Jump Comics
- Magazine: Weekly Young Jump
- Original run: November 7, 2019 – April 16, 2026
- Volumes: 12
- Anime television series
- Directed by: Yoshiaki Iwasaki
- Produced by: Ryōya Arisawa; Makoto Hijikata; Takamitsu Sueyoshi
- Written by: Jin Tanaka
- Music by: Ryōhei Sataka
- Studio: Arvo Animation
- Licensed by: Crunchyroll; SA/SEA: Medialink
- Original network: TXN (TV Tokyo)
- Original run: April 5, 2025 – June 28, 2025
- Episodes: 13
- Live-action film
- Directed by: Chihiro Ikeda
- Written by: Kiyoto Wada; Chihiro Ikeda
- Music by: Erina Koyama
- Studio: Robot Communications
- Released: August 29, 2025
- icon

Kowloon Generic Romance (Japanese: 九龍ジェネリックロマンス, Hepburn: Kūron Jenerikku Romansu) is a Japanese manga series written and illustrated by Jun Mayuzuki. It was serialized in Shueisha's seinen manga magazine Weekly Young Jump from November 2019 to April 2026, with its chapters collected in 12 tankōbon volumes. The story is set in Kowloon Walled City, Hong Kong.

A 13-episode anime television series adaptation produced by Arvo Animation aired from April to June 2025, and a live-action film adaptation produced by Robot Communications premiered in theaters in August of the same year.

== Synopsis ==
Kowloon Walled City, the most densely populated place on Earth, houses over 33,000 residents within a labyrinth of interconnected high-rises spanning just 6.5 acres (2.6 ha). Within this urban enclave lies the Wong Loi Realty Company, where an office romance develops between two coworkers: the easygoing yet brash Hajime Kudou and the reserved Reiko Kujirai, who has been in love with him since first meeting him. Despite their contentious dynamic, the two share a close rapport, frequently having lunch together. Their mutual affection for Kowloon Walled City gradually deepens their bond—yet an underlying peculiarity lingers between them.

== Characters ==
Reiko Kujirai (鯨井 令子, Kujirai Reiko)
Voiced by: Haruka Shiraishi (Japanese); Lauren Landa (English)
Portrayed by: Riho Yoshioka
A 32-year-old real estate agent residing alone in Kowloon Walled City. She maintains a professional relationship with Hajime Kudo, unaware they were formerly engaged and that she once mentored him at their workplace. Despite her complete memory loss regarding their past, she is in love with him, though he does not reciprocate. She enjoys Kowloon's urban culture and has a peculiar habit of smoking while eating watermelon.
Hajime Kudou (工藤 発, Kudō Hajime)
Voiced by: Tomokazu Sugita (Japanese); Ben Balmaceda (English)
Portrayed by: Koshi Mizukami
A 34-year-old real estate agent who transferred from the Japanese branch to work at a small Kowloon office with Reiko. Like Reiko, he deeply appreciates Kowloon's urban culture and cuisine. Though formerly Kujirai's junior colleague and fiancé, he never mentions their past relationship due to her complete memory loss. He is aware of the current Kujirai being in love with him, but does not feel the same way for her at all, and is often seen taunting her for it.
Xiaohei (小黒, Shaohei)
Voiced by: Sayumi Suzushiro (Japanese); Risa Mei (English)
Portrayed by: Kotone Hanase
A young woman who works part-time at various establishments in Kowloon, including shoe stores and cinemas. Petite in stature, she typically wears her hair in a bun and dresses in charming Chinese-style outfits. She is acquainted with both Reiko and Hajime.
Yaomay (楊明, Yōmei)
Voiced by: Aoi Koga (Japanese); Anjali Kunapaneni (English)
Portrayed by: Minami Umezawa
A 27-year-old doll-making seamstress residing in Kowloon Walled City, she struggles with excessive unsold inventory until Reiko, Hajime, and Shaohei assist her. Following a chance meeting where she learns of Reiko's amnesia, they form a friendship. She maintains she underwent complete physical reconstruction to abandon her past, though provides no further details about her history. She was later revealed to be the daughter of a famous actress, and grew tired of being compared to her mother, leading to an identity crisis.
Miyuki Hebinuma (蛇沼 みゆき, Hebinuma Miyuki)
Voiced by: Ryōtarō Okiayu (Japanese); Kayleigh McKee (English)
Portrayed by: Ryo Ryusei
President of Hebinuma Pharmaceutical, a major conglomerate specializing in beauty and pharmaceutical products. With his slicked-back hair, sharp serpentine eyes, and distinctive forked tongue, he presents a striking appearance. After inheriting his father's pharmaceutical company, he rapidly expanded the business and now personally operates a popular beauty counseling service for women. Miyuki develops an unusual fascination with Reiko when she visits his clinic using a promotional coupon, eventually surprising her with an unsolicited kiss at her workplace.
Tao Gwen (タオ・グエン, Tao Guen)
Voiced by: Taito Ban (Japanese); Edward Mendoza (English)
Portrayed by: Shuntarō Yanagi
A former waiter at the Goldfish Tea House. He initially informs Reiko about her past engagement to Hajime (as "Kujirai B"). After mysteriously disappearing, he later recognizes that the current Reiko differs from the one he knew. Formerly the partner of Miyuki during their Kowloon investigations, he continues assisting Reiko and Yaomay in uncovering the city's mysteries after their abrupt breakup.
Yūlong (ユウロン, Yūron)
Voiced by: Kengo Kawanishi
Portrayed by: Figaro Tseng
An associate of Miyuki who investigates the mysterious Second Kowloon phenomenon. Initially unable to perceive or enter Kowloon, he discovers that "regret" serves as the key requirement for access.
Xiaohei (小黒, Shaohei) (male)
Voiced by: Soma Saito
A young man who works for Miyuki's father. He is the original version of the female Xiaohei. Through unknown methods, Xiaohei can enter Kowloon without his female copy disappearing.
Kujirai B (鯨井B)
Voiced by: Yuriko Yamaguchi (Japanese); Amber Lee Connors (English)
Kujirai B is a deceased woman who bore a striking resemblance to Reiko. The alias was given by Yaomay. Two years older than Hajime, she served as his senior at Wong Loi Realty Company and was formerly engaged to him.

== Production ==
According to Mayuzuki, she had the idea of launching a series about Kowloon Walled City while her previous work After the Rain was still being serialized. She liked the topic of Kowloon Walled City and first learned about it from Kowloon's Gate when she was young.

== Media ==
=== Manga ===
Written and illustrated by Jun Mayuzuki, Kowloon Generic Romance was serialized in Shueisha's seinen manga magazine Weekly Young Jump from November 7, 2019, to April 16, 2026. Shueisha collected its 108 individual chapters in 12 tankōbon volumes, published from February 19, 2020, to April 17, 2026.

In January 2022, Yen Press announced that it had licensed the manga for English release in North America. The first volume was released on August 9, 2022.

==== Volumes ====
No.	Original release date	Original ISBN	English release date	English ISBN
1	February 19, 2020	978-4-08-891488-6	August 9, 2022	978-1-9753-4578-5
Chapters 1–8
2	July 17, 2020	978-4-08-891532-6	December 13, 2022	978-1-9753-4580-8
Chapters 9–17
3	November 19, 2020	978-4-08-891728-3	April 18, 2023	978-1-9753-4582-2
Chapters 18–26
4	February 19, 2021	978-4-08-891829-7	July 18, 2023	978-1-9753-4584-6
Chapters 27–35
5	June 18, 2021	978-4-08-892012-2	October 17, 2023	978-1-9753-6377-2
Chapters 36–44
6	November 19, 2021	978-4-08-892131-0	February 20, 2024	978-1-9753-7143-2
Chapters 45–53
7	May 18, 2022	978-4-08-892271-3	June 18, 2024	978-1-9753-7145-6
Chapters 54–62
8	December 19, 2022	978-4-08-892433-5	September 17, 2024	978-1-9753-7147-0
Chapters 63–70
9	October 19, 2023	978-4-08-892863-0	January 21, 2025	979-8-8554-0367-1
Chapters 71–78
10	October 18, 2024	978-4-08-893267-5	November 25, 2025	979-8-8554-1872-9
Chapters 79–87
11	April 17, 2025	978-4-08-893715-1	May 26, 2026	979-8-8554-2757-8
Chapters 88–95
12	April 17, 2026	978-4-08-894064-9	—	—
Chapters 96–108

=== Anime ===
In October 2024, it was announced that the series would receive an anime television series adaptation. It is produced by Arvo Animation and directed by Yoshiaki Iwasaki, with series composition and episode screenplays by Jin Tanaka, character designs by Yuka Shibata, art direction by Yūji Kaneko, and music composed by Ryōhei Sataka. The series aired from April 5 to June 28, 2025, on TV Tokyo and its affiliates. The opening theme song is "Summertime Ghost" (サマータイムゴースト, Samātaimu Gōsuto), performed by Wednesday Campanella, while the ending theme song is "Koi no Retronym" (恋のレトロニム, Koi no Retoronimu; lit. 'A Retronym for Love'), performed by Mekakushe.

Crunchyroll is streaming the series. Medialink licensed the series in South and Southeast Asia for streaming on Ani-One Asia's YouTube channel.

==== Episodes ====
No.	Episode	Directed by (Note: Production staff information is taken from the ending credits of each episode.)	Storyboarded by	Animation directed by	Original release date
1	Episode 1	Taishi Kawaguchi	Yoshiaki Iwasaki	Shiori Sakaguchi & Hirofumi Takahashi	April 5, 2025
Inside the technologically recreated Kowloon Walled City, built using a system called Generic Terra and suspended in the sky, Reiko Kujirai begins her workday at Wong Loi Realty alongside her co-worker Hajime Kudo, for whom she has feelings. Reiko struggles with her vision and relies on eye drops made by Hebinuma Pharmaceuticals, which raises concern in Kudo due to his distrust of the company, which secretly controls Generic Terra. Reiko visits an optometrist to address her eyesight. Later, she and Kudo discuss Kowloon's degradation, yet acknowledge the nostalgic attachment its residents feel. The next day, Kudo takes Reiko to Sunset Street and the Goldfish Teahouse, a spot he frequents. There, he tells her to find small familiar quirks in people to help her remember them. Reiko buys a goldfish as a memento. The following day, while repainting a vacant unit, she nearly faints from a heat stroke but is saved by Kudo. The next morning, Kudo wakes up on her couch and kisses her, mistaking her for someone else. After he leaves work, Reiko finds a photograph of herself and Kudo at the teahouse. When the waiter confirms he took the picture, Reiko realizes she's missing part of her memories.
2	Episode 2	Taishi Kawaguchi	Yoshiaki Iwasaki	Shiori Sakaguchi, Hirofumi Takahashi & You Seon Hwang	April 12, 2025
Reiko's friend Xiaohei complains about constant noise from her neighbor Yaomay, a seamstress who makes plushies. Reiko visits Yaomay to ask about a mysterious photo, and Yaomay suggests Reiko is not the same person as the woman in the picture: Kujirai B. Meanwhile, Kudo realizes the photo is missing and recalls how he met Kujirai B after being transferred to the Kowloon Walled City office. She introduced him to the city and expressed her love for its nostalgic charm, while Kudo remained distant, knowing its eventual demolition. In the present, Reiko and Yaomay have dinner, during which Yaomay warns Reiko to wait before seeking the truth, as it's complicated. Kudo notices differences between Reiko and Kujirai B, including unpierced ears and crow's feet. Reiko and Yaomay later visit a Hebinuma Pharmaceuticals clinic. Afterwards, they return to the teahouse only to learn that Tao Gwen, the waiter who took the photo, has quit. Reiko tries to impress Kudo with clip-on earrings, but fails. Kudo apologizes and invites her to dinner. The next day, Reiko consults with Miyuki Hebinuma, president of Hebinuma Pharmaceuticals, about anti-aging treatment. He touches her face and chillingly claims her missing memories never existed. Disgusted, Reiko leaves.
3	Episode 3	Masato Kitagawa	Nagisa Miyazaki	Shiori Sakaguchi, Hirofumi Takahashi, Jeong Min Yeo & You Seon Hwang	April 19, 2025
In the original Kowloon Walled City, Kujirai B taught Kudo that nostalgia is akin to love. In the present, Miyuki Hebinuma visits the realty office, where Kudo confronts him. Miyuki sprays Kudo with sanitizer and forcefully kisses Reiko before leaving. Later, on a day off, Kudo visits Reiko's apartment with a new fish tank and experiences a nostalgic feeling similar to when he first visited Kujirai B's apartment. The next day, Reiko gives Kudo a sunflower and vase in gratitude. Xiaohei arrives looking to move to a bigger apartment and falls in love with the sunflower. She chooses a unit Kudo suggests, which has rooftop access to a hidden sunflower garden. Meanwhile, at Miyuki's mansion outside the walled city, Miyuki and Gwen discuss a leaked article revealing that the true heir of Hebinuma Pharmaceuticals died and that Miyuki was adopted to replace him. Gwen, revealed to be a different person from the original waiter, must wear a mask inside Kowloon. Kudo tries to find Gwen but is blocked by the city's shifting layout. Gwen visits Reiko, tells her Kujirai B is dead, and reveals that Reiko is living someone else's life. Shaken, Reiko faints after Kudo confirms the illusion.
4	Episode 4	Masato Kitagawa	Nagisa Miyazaki	Hiroki Sekitou & Kiyoshi Nohji	April 26, 2025
Kudo dreams of conversing with Kujirai B, where she reveals he's working in a second Kowloon Walled City, an illegal reconstruction created after the original's demolition in 1994. Reiko wakes up in Kudo's apartment. Meanwhile, Miyuki and Gwen enter the current Kowloon, where Gwen notices inconsistencies, such as Hebinuma eyedrops being advertised as new despite existing for three years, and Reiko's beauty mark being different. At dinner, Yaomay tells Reiko about a deleted post referencing clone research tied to the Generic Terra-backed Zirconian Project. She shows Reiko a zirconian ring, telling her that even if she's not real, she can still shine like a diamond. The next day, Reiko, Kudo, Yaomay, and Xiaohei gather at Xiaohei's rooftop-view apartment to celebrate. Yaomay encourages Reiko to move, though Reiko remains hesitant. Kudo plays mahjong without Chan, who has been summoned by Miyuki for a medical exam. Upon entering Kowloon, Chan vanishes, prompting Miyuki to tell Gwen the clone is likely lost. Miyuki also reveals he's investigating Kudo through Hebinuma's Japan branch and refuses to disclose how Kujirai B died. When Kudo asks Reiko how much she knows, and she replies Kujirai B is dead, Kudo admits to killing her.
5	Episode 5	Jet Inoue	Nagisa Miyazaki	Yuka Shibata & Yui Kinoshita	May 3, 2025
Though Kudo confirms Kujirai B is dead, his confession turns out to be hypothetical. The next day, Reiko reads a mystery novel once favored by Kujirai B and finds a hidden diamond ring behind the book. She and Kudo, sleep-deprived, discuss the novel at work. Afterward, they visit the bookstore where Xiaohei works to buy the next volume, but it's misprinted. Reiko instead picks a picture book. Later, Reiko receives tickets to a classic film starring Yangli, revealed to be Yaomay's mother. Yaomay reflects on losing her identity while trying to live up to her mother's legacy. Reiko lifts her spirits with egg tarts and reminds her to be her true self. The next day, they go shopping, and Yaomay joyfully buys zirconia earrings. That night, Kudo dreams of his first teahouse visit with Reiko, where he realized his love for Kowloon. Meanwhile, Gwen is driven into the walled city by a cab driver. It's revealed that the current iteration of Kowloon, generated by the Generic Terra system, is only visible to certain individuals standing at the demolished site of the second city. This suggests that the entire environment may be an elaborate simulation perceptible only to select people.
6	Episode 6	Taishi Kawaguchi	Nagisa Miyazaki	Shiori Sakaguchi, Hiroki Sekitou & Hirofumi Takahashi	May 10, 2025
Miyuki meets with his father to discuss data from the Generic Terra and Zirconian projects. The following day, Gwen confronts Miyuki, urging him to abandon his revenge and expressing his love by kissing. In a flashback, after the second city's demolition was announced, Gwen decided to live as a drifter, while Kujirai B remarked that her story would remain stagnant. In the present, Reiko meets with Yaomay and Gwen to learn more about Kujirai B. Gwen confirms Kudo didn't kill her but refuses to reveal how she died. After Reiko departs, Yaomay tells Gwen that Reiko helped her rediscover herself. Later, outside the walled city, Miyuki visits his doctor, Wong, who opposes Generic Terra. Miyuki reveals he is intersex and expresses a desire for pregnancy. Yulong, Miyuki's childhood friend, overhears and enters. Miyuki explains the Generic Terra project aims to recreate his father's deceased son, but without memories. Yulong reveals he grew up with Miyuki but cannot perceive the Generic Terra city, suggesting only those who "resonate" with it can see it—though he's unsure of the criteria. Meanwhile, Reiko and Kudo shop for ramen and dream of traveling. Suddenly, an explosion occurs, and Kudo races toward it.
7	Episode 7	Daisuke Kurose	Nagisa Miyazaki	Kiyoshi Nohji, Katsuji Matsumoto, Zang Chen, Jiaxin Wang & Wei A	May 17, 2025
In a flashback, Kudo confides in Gwen about his intention to propose to Kujirai B before the second city's demolition. In the present, Kudo rushes to the explosion site and reunites with the real Gwen for the first time since that demolition. Gwen urges Kudo to leave the walled city, but he refuses. Meanwhile, Miyuki attempts to visit Dr. Wong's Kowloon clinic, collapsing en route while recalling how he fell in love with Gwen shortly after his family oversaw the demolition. Miyuki later awakes in a burlesque club. Reiko arrives and questions Miyuki about Zirconians. He tells her she is not a Zirconia, but a "Generic". Meanwhile, Yulong examines Wong's records and discovers the original Reiko's file: she died by suicide and was brought to Wong. On August 30, Reiko tells Yaomay she plans to leave the walled city. That night, Kudo visits Reiko and reveals that August 31 marks the anniversary of the original Kujirai's death. The next day, as Reiko and Yaomay prepare to leave, Gwen intercepts them. A delivery man fails to see Reiko or the city, prompting Gwen to explain that the second city was demolished three years ago—and Reiko doesn't exist outside Generic Terra.
8	Episode 8	Shunji Yoshida	Yūichi Nihei	Tomoya Noguchi, Rie Usui, Ruki Matsui, Kansaku Andō & Yuki Nishimura	May 24, 2025
Gwen explains to Reiko and Yaomay that the Generic Terra version of Kowloon is populated by digital copies of former second city residents, who vanish when their real selves enter—except for Reiko, whose original is dead. Skeptical, Yaomay departs for Hong Kong to investigate. Meanwhile, Yulong contacts Miyuki to confirm that the original Reiko died of an overdose. Her official medication was sleeping pills for insomnia, but the true fatal drug was covered up. Yulong also uncovers that Miyuki's father demolished the second city to conceal that Miyuki is a substitute for his late son Haoran. Elsewhere, the real Xiaohei—actually a young man, not a girl—enters the walled city under orders from Miyuki's father, but his clone doesn't vanish, defying the known rules. Inside the city, Reiko, who's unable to leave, confesses her love to Kudo again, and this time he promises to stay by her side. On her trip, Yaomay recalls discovering the city post-surgery and notes its perpetual summer climate. She visits an internet café, chats with Yulong, and shares Gwen's revelations. The next morning, after Reiko and Kudo sleep together, Reiko's phone reveals the date is July 1, not September 1—time inside Generic Terra is looping.
9	Episode 9	Masato Kitagawa	Nagisa Miyazaki	Mariko Inagaki, Etsuhito Mori & Jiaxin Wang	May 31, 2025
Kudo recalls the original Reiko making French toast to honor her late mother, noting how she didn't mourn but found comfort in the ritual. Meanwhile, Yaomay returns from Hong Kong and informs Gwen and Reiko of her findings. Curious about the effects of consuming non-existent items, Yaomay drinks iced coffee from the Generic Terra version and suddenly forgets their conversation. Gwen warns Miyuki not to ingest anything within the walled city and reveals that the Kudo inside is the real one. Later, the real Xiaohei, disguised as a maintenance worker, inspects Yaomay's apartment and gets a frilly vest lining from her. Under the alias "Snakeberry", he reports to Miyuki's father, stating that the Generic Terra copy of Reiko differs significantly from the original. He concludes that the Zirconian Project, intended to recreate the deceased, may only function within the walled city and that Reiko is its key. Miyuki's father instructs Xiaohei to prevent her from leaving. Outside the city, Yulong confronts Miyuki about halting his revenge, but Miyuki refuses. That night, Reiko wears her original's glasses and begins seeing lost memories. Meanwhile, Yulong catches Xiaohei bugging his conversation and offers him a new job, killing the copy Reiko.
10	Episode 10	Asahi Yoshimura	Yūichi Nihei	Hodaka Hashimoto, Daisuke Saitō, Kansaku Andō, Tōi Yamamichi, Ruki Matsui, Mari Saitō, Dai Ōhara, Kaori Takahashi & Yuki Nishimura	June 7, 2025
Xiaohei hesitates to accept Yulong's offer to kill Reiko, prompting Yulong to reveal that Generic Terra replicates the second city as it was three years ago and that transformation back into a girl might be possible through it. Conflicted, Xiaohei returns to the walled city and reunites with Yaomay, catching a glimpse of his copy running nearby. Reiko tells Yaomay she's been seeing the original Kujirai's memories through special glasses only she can see. When she visits Kudo, she notices stark differences in how he treated the original compared to her. That night, Reiko describes seeing Bai Yuen Shan Tower, an area Kudo forbade her from visiting, in the glasses. She and Yaomay visit the tower and meet Xiaohei. Mimicking the original, Reiko removes a talisman from the wall, revealing a "403" error code. Reporting this to Gwen, she deduces the original Reiko committed suicide there and that her relationship with Kudo had deeper issues he won't admit. Gwen grabs Xiaohei, surprised his copy hasn't disappeared. Reiko begins pulling talismans throughout the city, discovering various error codes. That night, Yaomay eats chocolate given by Yulong which undoes the walled city's memory-erasing effect, allowing her to remember her Hong Kong findings.
11	Episode 11	Taishi Kawaguchi	Nagisa Miyazaki	Shiori Sakaguchi, Hirofumi Takahashi & Yuki Nishimura	June 14, 2025
Yulong recalls Miyuki revealing his snake tattoo and forked tongue as proof of loyalty to the Hebinuma family, revenge-driven by his mother's death. Yaomay shares what she learned from Yulong in Hong Kong with Gwen, who warns her to avoid talismans, suspecting Hebinuma Group's involvement. That night, Reiko sees Kujirai B's memory of obtaining a deadly drug called Infinity and tells Yaomay she'll revisit Bai Yuen Shan. The next day, Reiko takes Xiaohei to his copy's apartment to fix a fire alarm, hoping to understand why his copy still exists. Gwen tells Kudo the truth about Xiaohei being male, causing the copy to vanish and Xiaohei to faint. Xiaohei explains that the Generic Terra walled city was created from Kudo's consciousness and can't replicate what Kudo doesn't recognize, so his copy remained because Kudo didn't realize he's a crossdressing man. Xiaohei reveals he abandoned his mission to kill Reiko after accepting he can't return to his past self. Yaomay and Xiaohei leave the walled city—Yaomay to reconcile with her mother, Xiaohei to pursue love in another form. As they depart, Xiaohei's dresses vanish but his vest lining remains, and they see only the ruins of the second city.
12	Episode 12	Daisuke Kurose	Nagisa Miyazaki	Hirofumi Takahashi, Shiori Sakaguchi, Yuki Nishimura, Nemuri Aki, Jia Liu, Kaika, Jiaxin Wang, Xu Jingqiang, Liu Hailin & Tang Weixin	June 21, 2025
Miyuki reports to his father about the Zirconian Project but soon learns his father has dementia, prompting him to accelerate the end of the Generic Terra project and consider his revenge complete. Now able to enter the Generic Terra version of the walled city, Yulong, one of Generic Terra's developers, targets Kudo and meets Reiko. As they head to a drug dealer, Yulong explains that Infinity is a discontinued Hebinuma cold medicine, banned due to its hallucinogenic effects in high doses. Some packs remained hidden inside the second city, and its demolition was ordered to cover up the scandal. Yulong urges Reiko to die to free Kudo from his regrets, but she refuses, choosing to believe in herself and tries persuading him instead. Miyuki returns to the walled city, finds Dr. Wong's clinic empty, and encounters Gwen. Miyuki reveals he sought revenge because he was adopted only after his ill mother was saved, but his adoptive father broke his promise. Having lost everything, he regrets not listening to Gwen, and they reconcile. Meanwhile, Reiko shows Kudo the drug Infinity, helping him realize his inner troubles. As Kudo confronts his regrets, the Generic Terra version of the walled city starts disappearing.
13	Episode 13	Yoshiaki Iwasaki & Masato Kitagawa	Nagisa Miyazaki	Hiroki Sekitou, Mariko Inagaki, Kazunori Ozawa, Shiori Sakaguchi, Hirofumi Takahashi, Yuki Nishimura & Jiaxin Wang	June 28, 2025
As the walled city collapses, Reiko is plunged into a virtual sea but is rescued by her goldfish, Success. Following Success, she discovers a secret movie theater where she watches Kujirai B's memories leading up to her death. On August 31, Kudo found the original Reiko dead in her apartment as the walled city's demolition began. One year later, filled with regret, Kudo returns to the ruins and holds Reiko's glasses that activate Generic Terra, trapping him in a repeating two-month loop for two years. Kudo meets Reiko in the theater and realizes her imperfect replication was because Kujirai B never revealed her true self to him. Reiko introduces Kudo to his own copy, who admits regret and a desire to redo his past but accepts it's now impossible to do so. Reiko leaves the walled city without vanishing, having been fully replicated into a physical form as Generic Terra disintegrates and the reimagined city disappears. Outside, she reunites with Yaomay, Xiaohei, and Success. Miyuki and Gwen are seen quietly walking away. Two years later, Reiko works as a travel agent in Hong Kong; the Hebinuma Group has dissolved and Miyuki is missing. While dining, Reiko reunites with Kudo for the first time outside the walled city.

=== Live-action film ===
In October 2024, a live-action film adaptation was announced. It is produced by Robot Communications, distributed by Bandai Namco Filmworks and directed by Chihiro Ikeda. It premiered in Japanese theaters on August 29, 2025. The film's theme song is "Haze", performed by the band Kroi.

== Reception ==
=== Manga ===
The manga had over 1.2 million copies in circulation by December 2024. In 2020, the manga was one of the 50 nominees for the sixth Next Manga Awards. It ranked third on Takarajimasha's Kono Manga ga Sugoi! list of best manga of 2021 for male readers. It was nominated for the 14th Manga Taishō in 2021 and placed ninth with 46 points.

=== Anime ===
The anime was nominated for Best Background Art at the 10th Crunchyroll Anime Awards in 2026. It was also nominated in the Daruma for Best Romance Anime and Suspense Anime categories at the Japan Expo Awards in the same year.

The Encyclopedia of Science Fiction described Kowloon Generic Romance as an impressive but flawed anime, praising its intriguing setting and characters and its exploration of identity, regret and nostalgia. It highlighted the series' use of science-fiction concepts such as mind uploading, cloning and virtual reality to explore the relationship between memory and individual identity. However, the encyclopedia criticized the adaptation's attempt to compress a lengthy, unfinished manga into thirteen episodes, resulting in rushed pacing and an insufficiently developed conclusion. It also found the mechanism behind the recreation of Kowloon Walled City inadequately explained, noting that the appearance of HTTP status codes within the city suggested a computer-generated simulation, although other interpretations remained possible.
