= Daisuke Igarashi =

Japanese manga artist

- Born: April 2, 1969 (age 57) Saitama, Japan
- Area: Manga artist
- Notable works: Witches; Little Forest; Children of the Sea; Saru

Daisuke Igarashi (五十嵐 大介, Igarashi Daisuke; born April 2, 1969) is a Japanese manga artist. Active since the 1990s, he is known for his detailed depictions of nature in combination with spiritual or surreal themes. Manga series like Witches and Children of the Sea have been critically acclaimed and translated into several languages.

== Life and career ==
Igarashi was born in Saitama in the suburbs of Tokyo. As a child, he would often spend time in a grove of Tsuki-jō in Saitama, consisting of trees that were several hundreds of years old. He started drawing, because he wanted to depict the beauty of these trees. He graduated from Tama Art University, where he studied oil painting from 1989 on. He was classmates with fellow manga artist Hiroaki Samura, but the two of them only properly met later while working for the same manga magazine. After graduating, he travelled through Japan and sketched landscapes that he saw.

In 1993, Igarashi won the newcomer award Afternoon Shiki Shō ("Afternoon Seasons Prize") of the manga magazine Monthly Afternoon with the short story "Ohayashi ga kikoeru hi" ("A Day Festival Music Is Heard") and its publication in the February 1994 issue was his debut as a professional manga artist. The short story is set in Tsuki-jō shrine. He had previously submitted the manga to the shōjo manga magazine LaLa, but the magazine's editors rejected it due to its lack of romance in the story and advised Igarashi to submit it to a seinen manga magazine. "Ohayashi ga kikoeru hi" became the first chapter of the series Hanashippanashi, consisting of different short stories. He focused on a series consisting of short stories in order to still experiment with styles and themes in the beginning of his career. Hanashippanashi was serialized in Monthly Afternoon until 1996. In the following six years he only published some short stories, which were collected in the book Sora Tobi Tamashii in 2002.

He gained wider recognition in 2002. He made a name for himself with the series Little Forest, which he published in Monthly Afternoon from 2002 until 2005 and which was based on his own experiences of living an autark life. Igarashi lived for three years in the countryside of Iwate Prefecture, where he was working in rice fields, and his editors approached him about making a manga series about his life. The series was adapted into two live-action films in Japan 2014 and 2015 and into another live-action film in South Korea in 2018.

In 2003 he started working for other publishers than Kodansha. In Shogakukan's then new manga magazine Monthly Ikki, he published the series Witches until 2004. From 2006 until 2011 he drew Children of the Sea for the same magazine. Both works received awards and Children of the Sea was adapted into an anime film in 2019 by Studio 4°C. Under Shogakukan's Ikki Comics imprint, he published the two-volume series Saru in 2010 as a collaboration with novelist Kōtarō Isaka, who published the novel SOS no Saru at the same time, with the novel and the manga referencing each other.

He also drew smaller work for publishers other than Kodansha and Shogakukan. In 2005, French comic artist Frédéric Boilet invited him to create a short story about Iwate Prefecture and the cover illustration for the French-Japanese anthology Japan: As Viewed by 17 Creators. Igarashi has also published short stories in the alternative manga magazine Manga Erotics F, the lifestyle magazine Brutus and Shueisha's manga magazine Jump X.

He returned to working for Kodansha in 2015, publishing the series Designs in Monthly Afternoon until 2019. Since 2022, he works on Kamakura Bake Neko Club, which is his first work serialized in a female-oriented manga magazine, the josei manga magazine Be Love.

== Style and influences ==
=== Themes ===
Igarashi aims to show the beauty of different aspects of nature in his work. With Children of the Sea, he focused on showing the depth and greatness of the sea: "The movement, the sounds, everything about it draws you in. Those are the sorts of things that captivated me." While growing up, he didn't live by the seaside and his inspiration mostly come from vacation in Okinawa. After having started to work on the manga, he himself moved from the mountains to the seaside. He is known for drawing plants and animals with a lot of realism as well as for his "maximalist" spreads showing panoramic landscape views.

Many of his works deal with spiritual themes and folklore. For Witches, he did research around Japanese festivals that have similarities all across Japan and mythology that has similarities all across the world. He states: "Maybe that, a long time ago, there was a sort of community that used to share a similar way of thinking, across the world." Saru is loosely adapted from the classic Chinese novel Journey to the West.

Most of his human protagonists are girls or women. He reasons that femininity is connected with nature and that drawing cute female characters gives his work a bigger mass appeal. In Witches, he draws on mythology and fairy tales around femininity to show different women being ostracized or excluded from society by patriarchy. He has stated that Children of the Sea, despite being published in a seinen magazine, was drawn with a female readership in mind.

=== Visual style and drawing process ===
Most of Igarashi's human characters are often drawn in a simple and sketched way in order to differentiate them from detailed backgrounds and accounts of nature. He has claimed that he is much less interested in depicting humans than nature.

Unusually for the manga industry, he draws without assistants. After creating a pencil sketch, he starts his inking process with a maru pen and fills in details with a ballpoint pen. Often he draws landscapes directly with a ballpoint pen without a previous pencil sketch. He draws sound words with a brush pen. At the end, he attaches screentone and scratches light effects into the screentone or uses it to make the focal point of a drawing stand out.

=== Influences ===
He names Hinako Sugiura as his favorite manga artist and he used to read Akira Toriyama and Rumiko Takahashi. Hayao Miyazaki's film My Neighbor Totoro was a key influence on his decision to become a manga artist: "Totoro helped me realize that it's okay for me to totally focus on drawing manga about things like, say… clear, slightly cold water." He often copied Yoshikazu Yasuhiko's drawings. In high school, he read a lot of shōjo manga like Taku Tsumugi, Megumi Wakatsuki, Minako Narita and Izumi Kawahara. Fumiko Takano and Miyazaki's manga Nausicaä of the Valley of the Wind have been praised by him in interviews. His style has earned comparisons to the films of Hayao Miyazaki.

== Reception ==
His work has received praise from other manga artists like Taiyō Matsumoto, Hiroaki Samura and Naoki Urasawa. The manga artist Yuki Urushibara cites him as an inspiration.

Several of his manga have been translated into other languages, among them English, Korean, French, Italian, Spanish, Czech Polish and Serbian.

For his work, Igarashi has received the following awards and nominations:

Award	Year	Category	Recipient(s)	Result	Ref.
Afternoon Shiki Shō	1993	Winter Award	"Ohayashi ga kikoeru hi"	Won	
American Library Association	2010	Great Graphic Novels for Teens	Children of the Sea	Won	
Angoulême International Comics Festival	2007	Prize for Best Album	Witches	Nominated	
Japan Cartoonists Association Award	2009	Excellence Award	Children of the Sea	Won	
Japan Media Arts Festival	2004	Excellence Award	Witches	Won	
Japan Media Arts Festival	2009	Excellence Award	Children of the Sea	Won	
Kono Manga ga Sugoi!	2017	Men's Manga	Designs	18th Place	
Manga Taishō	2011	—	Saru	13th Place	
Seiun Award	2011	Best Comic	Saru	Nominated	
Sugoi Japan Award	2017	Manga Award	Designs	Nominated	
Tezuka Osamu Cultural Prize	2005	Grand Prize	Little Forest	Nominated	
Tezuka Osamu Cultural Prize	2008	Grand Prize	Children of the Sea	Nominated	
Tezuka Osamu Cultural Prize	2009	Grand Prize	Children of the Sea	Nominated	

== Works ==
Title	Year	Notes	Refs
Hanashippanashi (はなしっぱなし)	1994–1996	Serialized in Monthly Afternoon; Published by Kodansha in 3 vol.	
Little Forest (リトル・フォレスト)	2002–2005	Serialized in Monthly Afternoon; Published by Kodansha in 2 vol.	
Sora Tobi Tamashii (そらトびタマシイ, "Spirit in the Sky")	2002	Short story collection published by Kodansha in 1 vol.	
Witches (魔女, Majo)	2003–2004	Serialized in Monthly Ikki; Published by Shogakukan in 2 vol. Published in English by Seven Seas Entertainment	
Kabocha no Bōken (カボチャの冒険, "The Adventures of Kabocha")	2003–2007	Serialized in Animal Paradise; Published by Takeshobo in 1 vol.	
Children of the Sea (海獣の子供, Kaijū no Kodomo)	2006–2011	Serialized in Monthly Ikki; Published by Shogakukan in 5 vol. Published in English by Viz Media	
Saru	2010	Collaboration with Kōtarō Isaka; Published by Shogakukan in 2 vol.	
Designs (ディザインズ)	2015–2019	Serialized in Monthly Afternoon; Published by Kodansha in 5 vol.	
Kyō no Ani Imōto (きょうのあにいもうと)	2015–2017	Serialized in Hibana	
Umwelt (ウムヴェルト)	2017	Collection of short stories published 2004–2014; Published by Kodansha in 1 vol.	
Kamakura Bake Neko Club (かまくらBAKE猫倶楽部)	2022–present	Serialized in Be Love	
