= Witches (manga) =

Japanese manga series

- First tankōbon volume cover

魔女 (Majo)
- Genre: Supernatural
- Manga
- Written by: Daisuke Igarashi
- Published by: Shogakukan
- English publisher: NA: Seven Seas Entertainment
- Imprint: Ikki Comix
- Magazine: Monthly Ikki
- Original run: April 25, 2003 – November 25, 2004
- Volumes: 2
- icon

Witches (Japanese: 魔女, Hepburn: Majo) is a Japanese anthology manga series written and illustrated by Daisuke Igarashi. It was serialized in Shogakukan's seinen manga magazine Monthly Ikki from April 2003 to November 2004, with its chapters collected in two tankōbon volumes. The series is licensed for English release in North America by Seven Seas Entertainment. Witches received an Excellence Award at the eighth Japan Media Arts Festival in 2004.

== Plot ==
Spindle
In the capital city, a place long said to bridge the divide between the "West" and the "East", the British woman Nicola Farsingford returns with newfound magical power, seeking vengeance against Mimaar, the one who once spurned her. Meanwhile, Shiraru, a nomadic girl gifted with strange abilities, journeys alone to the capital to deliver a message bestowed upon her by an "ancient and vast wisdom".
Kuarupu
Kumari, a native of the forest, lives peacefully among the spirits alongside her childhood friend Roant. However, when Roant is betrayed and killed by Pablo, who sides with the state's aggressive deforestation efforts, Kumari vows revenge. She sequesters herself in the "House of Spirits", offering her own body as sustenance to the forest spirits in exchange for their allegiance.
The Witch Stradling the Bird
Father Wid, visiting a high-ranking elder in a remote part of China, listens to the man's tale of his deceased sister, who has supposedly returned as a witch riding upon birds, imparting cryptic knowledge. When the elder reveals that the witch foretold the arrival of a "great falling stone", Father Wid becomes convinced this is a prophecy of immense significance.
Petra Genitalix
Alicia, an orphan taken in by the reclusive "Great Witch" Mira, learns to live by honing her senses deep in the mountains. A year later, Father Wid arrives seeking Mira's knowledge about the "Stone of Reproduction". Sensing her duty, Mira takes Alicia to the city where the stone is said to reside.
The Song Thief
Hinata, a high school girl who feels no connection to life, steals money meant for a school trip and embarks on a ferry journey with her cousin Yuuji. Onboard, she meets the intense-eyed woman Chisoku, who tells her, "You left on this journey to awaken". Influenced by her words, Hinata considers following Chisoku to the island where she claims to have awakened—only for both Chisoku and Yuuji to vanish upon arrival.
Beach
A young island girl searches desperately for her missing cat, Pishaama. A neighbor claims to have seen the cat swept away by the river days earlier. Remembering that all things lost to the tide eventually wash ashore on the opposite side of the island, the girl heads to the beach, regretful that she did not play with Pishaama more. There, a mysterious old woman appears before her.

== Publication ==
Written and illustrated by Daisuke Igarashi, Witches was serialized in Shogakukan's seinen manga magazine Monthly Ikki from April 25, 2003, to November 25, 2004. Shogakukan collected its chapters in two tankōbon volumes, released on April 30, 2004, and January 28, 2005.

In North America, Seven Seas Entertainment licensed the manga for English publication in a single omnibus volume, for both digital and print format, and was released on May 3, 2022.

=== Volumes ===
| No. | Original release date | Original ISBN | English release date | English ISBN |
|---|---|---|---|---|
| 1 | April 30, 2004 | 978-4-09-188461-9 | May 3, 2022 | 978-1-64827-839-6 |
01. "Spindle – Part 1"; 02. "Spindle – Part 2"; 03. "Kuarupu"; Extra: "The Witch Stradling the Bird" (騎鳥魔女, Ki Tori Majo)
| 2 | January 28, 2005 | 978-4-09-188462-6 | May 3, 2022 | 978-1-64827-839-6 |
04. "Petra Genitalix"; 05. "Thief of Songs" (うたぬすびと, Utanu Subito); Extra: "Beach" (ビーチ, Bīchi)

== Reception ==
Witches received an Excellence Award at the eighth Japan Media Arts Festival in 2004. In 2023, it was ranked in the American Library Association's Graphic Novels and Comics Round Table's "Best Graphic Novels for Adults" list, under its "Fiction" category.
