= Saru (manga) =

Japanese manga series

- First volume cover
- Manga
- Written by: Daisuke Igarashi
- Published by: Shogakukan
- Imprint: Ikki Comix
- Original run: February 25, 2010 – October 29, 2010
- Volumes: 2
- icon

Saru (stylized as SARU, lit. 'Monkey') is a Japanese manga written and illustrated by Daisuke Igarashi. It was created by a project with novelist author Kōtarō Isaka, in which they together shared ideas to create independents novel and manga works. Saru was launched by Shogakukan in two volumes in February and October 2010.

== Publication ==
Saru is written and illustrated by Daisuke Igarashi. It was created by a project with novelist author Kōtarō Isaka, in which they together shared ideas to create independent novel and manga works. Isaka wrote the novel SOS no Saru (SOSの猿; "SOS Monkey"), released by Chuokoron-Shinsha on November 25, 2009, and Igarashi published an introductory chapter of Saru on the same day on Monthly Ikki's website Ikki Paradise. The two volumes of Saru were published by Shogakukan under the "Ikki Comix" imprint on February 25 and October 29, 2010.

The manga has been licensed in France by Éditions Sarbacane, and in Italy by J-Pop.

=== Volumes ===
No.	Japanese release date	Japanese ISBN
1	February 25, 2010	978-4-09-188497-8
2	October 29, 2010	978-4-09-188518-0

== Reception ==
Saru was nominated for the fourth Manga Taishō in 2011.
