= Jun Mayuzuki =

Japanese manga artist

Jun Mayuzuki 眉月 じゅん
- Born: April 27, 1983 (age 43) Japan
- Area: Manga artist
- Notable works: After the Rain; Kowloon Generic Romance

Jun Mayuzuki (Japanese: 眉月 じゅん, Hepburn: Mayuzuki Jun; born April 27, 1983) is a Japanese manga artist.

== Career ==
Mayuzuki's most famous work is the series After the Rain, which was serialized in Shogakukan's Monthly Big Comic Spirits magazine in June 2014, before moving to the magazine Weekly Big Comic Spirits in January 2016 and finished in March 2018. In 2018, she won the 63rd Shogakukan Manga Award in the general category with the manga.

After the Rain was later adapted as both an animated TV series and a live action movie.

From November 2019 to April 2026, her work Kowloon Generic Romance, which is based on Kowloon Walled City in Hong Kong, was serialized in Shueisha's Weekly Young Jump. According to Mayuzuki, she had the idea of launching a series about Kowloon Walled City even when After the Rain was still serialized. She likes the topic of Kowloon Walled City and first knew about it from Kowloon's Gate when she was young.

== Works ==
- Iromon! (いろもん!) (2013–2014)
- After the Rain (恋は雨上がりのように, Koi wa Ameagari no Yō ni) (2014–2018)
- Kowloon Generic Romance (九龍ジェネリックロマンス) (2019–2026)
