= Ganglion (manga) =

Japanese manga

- Cover of the volume

ガングリオン (Ganguraion)
- Genre: Drama
- Manga
- Written by: Hisaya Shiraiwa
- Illustrated by: Takashi Itsuki
- Published by: Yoshimoto Books (serialization and volume); Wani Books (volume)
- Imprint: Yoshimoto Books
- Magazine: Comic Yoshimoto
- Original run: June 19, 2007 – September 18, 2007
- Volumes: 1
- Anime television series
- Directed by: Ayumu Watanabe
- Written by: Harise; Tomoaki Shiono
- Music by: Takeo Asami
- Studio: Studio Maf
- Original network: TV Tokyo, TV Osaka, AT-X, BS Yoshimoto
- Original run: October 3, 2025 – March 27, 2026
- Episodes: 24

Ganglion (ガングリオン, Ganguraion) is a Japanese manga written by Hisaya Shiraiwa and illustrated by Takashi Itsuki. It was serialized by Yoshimoto Books in its Comic Yoshimoto magazine from June to September 2007 and later published it in a single volume with Wani Books in April 2009. A short-form anime television series adaptation produced by Studio Maf aired from October 2025 to March 2026.

== Plot ==
The series follows Kenji Isobe, who works for the Ganglion company. Also known as Belve, he spends his days helping the company attain world domination. However, he has to fight opponents such as the hero Hopeman, who aim to bring justice to the world and defeat Belve and the others.

== Characters ==
Kenji Isobe (磯辺 健司, Isobe Kenji)
Voiced by: Yōji Ueda
A worker for the Ganglion company, who fights under the name Belve.
Colonel Shadow (シャドー大佐役, Shadō Taisayaku) / Jin Kageyama (本名 影山, Kageyama Jin)
Voiced by: Fumihiko Tachiki
Hopeman (ホープマン, Hōpuman)
Voiced by: Tomokazu Sugita
A hero intent on defeating Belve and Ganglion.
Setsuko Isobe (磯辺 節子, Isobe Setsuko)
Voiced by: Aoi Koga
Kenji's wife, who has a kind and caring personality.
Takashi Isobe (磯辺 タカシ, Isobe Takashi)
Voiced by: Yoshino Aoyama
Kenji and Setsuko's son.
Yumiko (ユミコ)
Voiced by: Hikaru Tono
Food Stall Owner (屋台のオヤジ, Yatai no Oyaji)
Voiced by: Itsuji Itao
The owner of the food stall that Kenji often visits after work.

== Media ==
=== Manga ===
Written by Hisaya Shiraiwa and illustrated by Takashi Itsuki, Ganglion was serialized by Yoshimoto Books in its Comic Yoshimoto magazine from June 19 to September 18, 2007, and later published it in a single tankōbon volume with Wani Books on April 25, 2009.

=== Anime ===
A short-form anime television series adaptation was announced on August 29, 2025. It is produced by Studio Maf and directed by Ayumu Watanabe (alongside Ryōsuke Tanaka as assistant director), with scripts written by Harise, series composition by Tomoaki Shiono, character designs by Shigeru Fujita, and music by Takeo Asami. The series aired from October 3, 2025, to March 27, 2026, on TV Tokyo and other networks. (Note: TV Tokyo listed the series premiere on October 3 at 25:53, which is effectively October 4 at 1:53 a.m. JST, though AT-X has the earliest release on October 3.) The ending theme song is "Miracle", performed by NIKO NIKO TAN TAN.
