= Little Forest (film) =

2018 South Korean film

- Theatrical release poster
- Hangul: 리틀 포레스트
- RR: Riteul poreseuteu
- MR: Rit'ŭl p'oresŭt'ŭ
- Directed by: Yim Soon-rye
- Screenplay by: Hwang Seong-gu
- Based on: Little Forest by Daisuke Igarashi
- Produced by: Jenna Ku
- Starring: Kim Tae-ri; Ryu Jun-yeol; Moon So-ri; Jin Ki-joo
- Cinematography: Lee Seung-hoon
- Edited by: Kim Seon-min
- Music by: Lee Jun-oh
- Production company: Watermelon Pictures
- Distributed by: Megabox Plus M
- Release date: February 28, 2018 (South Korea)
- Running time: 103 minutes
- Country: South Korea
- Language: Korean
- Budget: US$1.4 million
- Box office: US$11.1 million

Little Forest (Korean: 리틀 포레스트; RR: Riteul poreseuteu) is a 2018 South Korean drama film directed by Yim Soon-rye, based on the manga series Little Forest by Daisuke Igarashi. It stars Kim Tae-ri as Hye-won, a young woman who, after failing to pass the national qualification exam to become a teacher, abandons her part-time job in Seoul and returns to the rural village where she grew up.

== Synopsis ==
The story of a young woman who returns to her childhood home, in a traditional Korean village, after leaving for the big city in pursuit of what turned out to be an elusive dream. When she returns home, her mother isn't there – but her mother's "Little Forest", the many ways in which a single mother successfully made a home for her beloved child, unfurls with a long succession of lovingly sketched details involving mostly food preparation.

Two childhood friends are featured. One has abandoned his ambition to succeed in Seoul. The other, who never left home, continues to pursue that ambition locally.

== Cast ==
- Kim Tae-ri as Song Hye-won
- Ryu Jun-yeol as Lee Jae-ha
- Moon So-ri as Mom
- Jin Ki-joo as Joo Eun-sook
- Park Won-sang as Mailman
- Jung Jun-won as Hoon-yi

== Production ==
Principal photography began on January 21, 2017. It took place in a small village in South Gyeongsang Province. Filming wrapped up on October 26, 2017.

The film was produced at a cost of US$1.4 million.

== Reception ==
=== Box office ===
The film came in second place at the Korean box office on the opening day by attracting 131,337 audiences. During the first weekend since the film was released on 832 screens, Little Forest drew 372,394 moviegoers accounting for 22.3 percent of the weekend's ticket sales. This accumulated to a total of 686,000 ticket sales at the end of the first five days.

By March 10, 2018, within 11 days since its premiere, the film was watched by more than 1 million moviegoers, with US$7.5 million in takings.

During the second weekend, the film was viewed by 262,953 audiences and fell to third place at the Korean box office.

Little Forest remained in third place at the Korean box office after three weekends, attracting 127,456 moviegoers during the weekend and increasing the total ticket sales to 1.35 million at the end of three weeks.

Throughout the fourth weekend, the film attracted 60,162 moviegoers and dropped to fourth place at the weekend box office.

=== Critical response ===
The Korea Herald described Little Forest as "a small film with no villain, no real tension, and no real conflict", stating that the director "shows us that maybe letting go can give us exactly what we've wanted."

A Taipei Times review noted: "Little Forest plays out in a slow, unhurried pace that beckons audiences to focus on the journey instead of the destination. It falls right into the mould of your typical, feel-good cinematic fare, but the film proves that a threadbare plot can still be effective with stellar execution. While the narrative mostly revolves around Hye-won re-adjusting to the country life, this is a small film with a very big heart, thanks to Yim's meticulous direction and attention paid to the finest details."

== Awards and nominations ==
Awards	Category	Recipient	Result	Ref.
54th Baeksang Arts Awards	Best Actress	Kim Tae-ri	Nominated	
54th Baeksang Arts Awards	Best New Actress	Jin Ki-joo	Nominated	
27th Buil Film Awards	Best Actress	Kim Tae-ri	Nominated	
27th Buil Film Awards	Best New Actress	Jin Ki-joo	Nominated	
55th Grand Bell Awards	Best New Actress	Jin Ki-joo	Nominated	
2nd The Seoul Awards	Best New Actress	Jin Ki-joo	Nominated	
38th Korean Association of Film Critics Awards	Top 11 Films	Little Forest	Won	
39th Blue Dragon Film Awards	Best Film	Little Forest	Nominated	
39th Blue Dragon Film Awards	Best Director	Yim Soon-rye	Nominated	
39th Blue Dragon Film Awards	Best Actress	Kim Tae-ri	Nominated	
39th Blue Dragon Film Awards	Best Editing	Kim Sun-min	Nominated	
39th Blue Dragon Film Awards	Best Art Direction	Yoon Na-ra	Nominated	
5th Korean Film Producers Association Awards	Best Director	Yim Soon-rye	Won	
18th Director's Cut Awards	Best Actress	Kim Tae-ri	Won	
24th Chunsa Film Art Awards	Best Director	Yim Soon-rye	Nominated	
24th Chunsa Film Art Awards	Best Actress	Kim Tae-ri	Nominated	
24th Chunsa Film Art Awards	Best New Actress	Jin Ki-joo	Won	
