= To You in the Beyond =

Japanese light novel series by Akiko Abe

- First light novel volume cover

どこよりも遠い場所にいる君へ (Doko Yori mo Tooi Basho ni Iru Kimi e)
- Genre: Coming of age; Fantasy; Romance
- Light novel
- Written by: Akiko Abe
- Illustrated by: syo5
- Published by: Shueisha
- Imprint: Shueisha Orange Bunko
- Original run: October 20, 2017 – present
- Volumes: 3
- Manga
- Written by: Akiko Abe
- Illustrated by: Haruka Chino
- Published by: Shueisha
- Imprint: Young Jump Comics
- Magazine: Tonari no Young Jump
- Original run: August 6, 2025 – present
- Volumes: 2
- Anime film
- Directed by: Junichi Wada
- Written by: Sayaka Kuwamura
- Music by: Koji Nakamura
- Studio: TMS Entertainment
- Released: October 9, 2026
- Runtime: 116 minutes
- icon

To You in the Beyond (Japanese: どこよりも遠い場所にいる君へ, Hepburn: Doko Yori mo Tooi Basho ni Iru Kimi e) is a Japanese light novel series written by Akiko Abe and illustrated by syo5. It began publication by Shueisha under their Shueisha Orange Bunko imprint in October 2017, with three volumes being released as of June 2026. A manga adaptation of the first novel with art by Haruka Chino has been serialized online via Shueisha's Tonari no Young Jump manga website since August 2025 and has been collected in two tankōbon volumes. An anime film adaptation of the first novel produced by TMS Entertainment premiered in Japan in October 2026.

== Plot ==
Kazuki Tsukigase, a high school boy, transfers to Sakijima High School on a remote island in order to escape his past. The island is home to a mysterious location known as the "Cove of Spiriting Away," where people are rumored to disappear. Early one summer, Kazuki discovers an unconscious girl lying in the cove and brings her to a local hospital. When she awakens, she has no memory of her identity or origins, except for repeatedly murmuring the year "1974." Kazuki finds her name is Nanao, and he becomes involved in uncovering the truth behind Nanao's past and the island's legends.

== Characters ==
Kazuki Tsukigase (月ヶ瀬 和希, Tsukigase Kazuki)
Voiced by: Hiiro Ishibashi
Nanao Aika (秋鹿 七緒, Aika Nanao)
Voiced by: Anna Nagase
Mikiya Ozaki (尾崎 幹也, Ozaki Mikiya)
Voiced by: Shimba Tsuchiya
Takatsu (高津)
Voiced by: Hiroshi Tamaki
Nishina (仁科)
Voiced by: Naohito Fujiki
Tamaki Mishima (三島 たまき, Mishima Tamaki)
Voiced by: Sumire Uesaka
Shōji Aiba (相葉 修治, Aiba Shōji)
Voiced by: Wataru Hatano
Akimitsu Yamu (矢野 顕光, Yamu Akimitsu)
Voiced by: Nobuhiko Okamoto
Yoshiki Suga (須加 ヨシキ, Suga Yoshiki)
Voiced by: Yoshitsugu Matsuoka

== Media ==
=== Light novels ===
No.	Title	Release date	ISBN
1	Doko Yori mo Tooi Basho ni Iru Kimi e (どこよりも遠い場所にいる君へ)	October 20, 2017	978-4-08-680154-6
2	Mata Kimi to Deau Mirai no Tame ni (また君と出会う未来のために)	October 19, 2018	978-4-08-680214-7
3	Mada Inai Kimi ni Hoshi no Fune o (まだいない君に星の舟を)	June 19, 2026	978-4-08-680703-6

=== Manga ===
A manga adaptation of the first novel illustrated by Haruka Chino began serialization on Shueisha's Tonari no Young Jump manga website on August 6, 2025. The manga's chapters have been compiled into two tankōbon volumes as of September 2026.

No.	Release date	ISBN
1	February 19, 2026	978-4-08-894113-4
2	September 17, 2026	978-4-08-894431-9

=== Anime film ===
An anime film adaptation of the first novel was announced during Shochiku's 2026–2027 lineup announcement of films on January 27, 2026. The film is produced by TMS Entertainment and directed by Junichi Wada, from a screenplay written by Sayaka Kuwamura, characters designed by Hechima, and music composed by Koji Nakamura. It was released in Japan by Shochiku on October 9, 2026. The insert song is "Balsam", and the theme song is "Olive", both performed by Tota.
