= Kowloon's Gate =

1997 video game

- Developer: Sony Music Entertainment
- Publisher: Sony Music Entertainment
- Director: Hiroshi Kimura
- Producer: Akira Sudo
- Designer: Hiroshi Kimura
- Composer: Kuniaki Haishima
- Platform: PlayStation
- Release: JP: February 28, 1997; JP: April 14, 2010 (PSN)
- Genre: Adventure
- Mode: Single-player

Kowloon's Gate (クーロンズゲート, Kūronzu Gēto) is a 1997 adventure video game published by Sony Music Entertainment. It was released for the PlayStation in Japan, but not in other regions.

== Plot ==
The game takes place in the Kowloon Walled City in Hong Kong. On June 22, 1997, before the handover of Hong Kong, the demolished Kowloon Walled City reemerged from the realm of Yin (陰界) back to the streets of Hong Kong in the living realm of Yang (陽界). The Hong Kong Supreme Feng Shui Committee (香港最高風水会議) determined that the reappearance of the walled city was a sign of an imbalance of the Yin and Yang, and if the two parallel worlds are not separated once again, great calamity would occur. To set things straight, the order of Feng Shui would need to be re-instilled in the realm of Yin.

The protagonist, a Super Feng Shui Practitioner (超級風水師), was sent into the Kowloon Walled City to seek and awaken the Four Symbols so that order would be revived.

== Development ==
Kowloon's Gate was developed by the New Media Department of Sony Music Entertainment Japan (also credited to Zeque who also co-developed Planet Laika). This was a multimedia division of the company that worked on non-music products. It was conceived around 1992 as an early PlayStation game as an adventure game with an estimated release by late 1994.

As with a number of other titles developed during the early beginnings of the PlayStation, the game was created by staff outside the video gaming industry. The game designer was Hiroshi Kimura. The plan was to create an exploration experience to make use of a recently-acquired SGI Onyx in the Sony Music office. Kimura thought about setting the game in Morocco, evoking the bazaars and kasbahs of Prince of Persia, but had trouble gathering reference material detailed enough for graphical replication. Eventually, Hong Kong's Kowloon Walled City was chosen as the setting for its "underground" lair-like aura. The team was inspired by the photo book City of Darkness: Life in Kowloon Walled City, and visited Hong Kong for research in April 1994, even though the Walled City had been demolished by that time. Gameplay elements were inspired by adventure games like The Manhole and Myst.

By the end of 1994, images of the Kowloon's Gate game were released on magazines and it was estimated that the game itself would arrive in 1995, but the development of the game took three years; it was eventually released for the PlayStation in Japan on February 28, 1997. It was later re-released on the PlayStation Network on April 14, 2010.

There were reports that Sony once had plans to market the game outside Japan. The developers contemplated translating the game into English, but gave up on the idea because they were concerned about the quality of the translation considering the difficulty of the script and the practice of video game localization had not yet matured in the 1990s.

== Reception ==
Famitsu gave the game a score of 26 out of 40.

Critic Shin Muramatsu drew on his experience with the game's "Hong Kong Gothic" version of the Walled City to compare the past and future of Hong Kong itself.

It ultimately sold 135,000 units in the region.

== Legacy ==
Initial sales were not good. Still, as time went by, a fanbase developed who enjoyed the mysterious experience of Kowloon's Gate. Its fans uploaded videos to video-sharing sites on the web, leading to a minor following for the game in Japan. A 2009 reader poll in the video game magazine Famitsu ranked the game tenth in a list of games with highest demand for a sequel, with 151 votes.

To commemorate the 10th anniversary of the game in 2007, the original creators re-made the game world on Second Life.

Manga artist Jun Mayuzuki first learned about the Kowloon Walled City because of Kowloon's Gate. This would eventually lead to the creation of her 2019 manga series Kowloon Generic Romance.

On June 9, 2026, a fan translation group released their own unofficial English translation of the game.

== Prequel and sequel ==
In October 2017, a VR prequel named Kowloon's Gate VR Suzaku was released as a PlayStation VR exclusive by Jetman Inc. A non-VR version was added in an update to the game on December 21 of the same year, allowing the game to be played without a VR headset. An Oculus Go companion app featuring music from the game was released in October 2018. A Nintendo Switch version stripped of all VR elements but with new added content is made available physically through pre-orders only on the crowdfunding website Campfire in November to December 2025 and June to July 2026. The Switch version was made publicly available digitally on 29 October 2026.

In November 2019, a sequel, Kowloon's Rhizome: A Day of the Fire, was announced. It was originally planned to be a 3D dungeon crawler, but the prototype did not match the developers' expectations in its entertainment value, so they decided to make the game into a visual novel instead. A fall 2021 release was planned for Nintendo Switch, PlayStation 4 and Microsoft Windows in Japan, but this has not been realized. The game, split into 8 parts, was planned to be released on Pixiv's Booth service, with the first part released in February 2023. A complete version with all 8 parts was released on Booth on 31 May 2024.
