= Children of the Sea (film) =

Japanese animated film

- Theatrical release poster

Japanese name
- Kanji: 海獣のこども
Transcriptions
- Revised Hepburn: Kaijū no kodomo
- Directed by: Ayumu Watanabe
- Screenplay by: Hanasaki Kino
- Based on: Children of the Sea by Daisuke Igarashi
- Produced by: Eiko Tanaka
- Starring: Mana Ashida; Hiiro Ishibashi; Seishū Uragami; Win Morisaki; Goro Inagaki; Yu Aoi; Tohru Watanabe; Min Tanaka; Sumiko Fuji
- Edited by: Kiyoshi Hirose
- Music by: Joe Hisaishi
- Production company: Studio 4°C
- Distributed by: Toho
- Release dates: May 19, 2019 (Tokyo); June 7, 2019 (rest of Japan)
- Running time: 111 minutes
- Country: Japan
- Language: Japanese
- Box office: US$5.2 million (worldwide)

Children of the Sea (Japanese: 海獣の子供, Hepburn: Kaijū no Kodomo) is a 2019 Japanese animated fantasy surrealist film directed by Ayumu Watanabe and produced by Eiko Tanaka, with animation production by Studio 4°C. It is based on the manga series Children of the Sea by Daisuke Igarashi, who also wrote the film's screenplay. It is Watanabe's first theatrically released film since Space Brothers #0 (2014), and the first animated film adaptation of an Igarashi manga. The film stars the voices of Mana Ashida, Hiiro Ishibashi and Seishū Uragami. Set by and in the ocean and themed on the mysteries of life, it depicts the connections between humanity and nature. It was released in Japan on June 7, 2019.

== Plot ==
After a falling out with both her mother and the other members of her school club, female lead and junior high school student Ruka finds herself with nowhere to spend her days during summer vacation, and so she ends up hanging out at the aquarium where her father works. While there, she meets a mysterious pair of brothers, named Umi ("sea") and Sora ("sky"), who her father tells her were "raised by dugongs," and are being observed for their aquatic abilities. The three teens share some sort of connection to a series of supernatural phenomena that have been affecting the world's marine life, such as a comet falling into the sea and aquatic life from around the world gathering in Japan.

== Voice cast ==
- Mana Ashida (Japanese) and Anjali Gauld (English) as Ruka Azumi.
- Hiiro Ishibashi (Japanese) and Lynden Prosser (English) as Umi.
- Seishū Uragami (Japanese) and Benjamin Niewood (English) as Sora. (Note: Airu Kubozuka was initially announced to play Sora. However, he dropped out of the role since he had trouble with his voice changing due to puberty.)
- Win Morisaki (Japanese) and Beau Bridgland (English) as Anglade, a genius marine biologist who pursues the mystery surrounding Umi and Sora.
- Goro Inagaki (Japanese) and Marc Thompson (English) as Masaaki Azumi, Ruka's father who works at an aquarium.
- Yu Aoi (Japanese) and Karen Strassman (English) as Kanako Azumi, Ruka's mother, whose relationship with both Ruka and Masaaki is strained.
- Tohru Watanabe (Japanese) and Wally Wingert (English) as Sensei, the coach in charge of Ruka's handball team.
- Min Tanaka (Japanese) and Michael Sorich (English) as Jim, a former friend of Anglade and a marine biologist who now takes care of Umi and Sora.
- Sumiko Fuji (Japanese) and Denise Lee (English) as Dede, a mysterious figure who watches over Umi and Sora.
- Marina Otani and Miyuna Kadowaki of STU48 as handball club members (cameo; Japanese).

== Production ==
On 16 June 2018, animation production company Studio 4°C announced that it was producing an animated feature film adaptation of Daisuke Igarashi's comic Children of the Sea. On February 27, 2019, the main voice cast and production team behind the movie were announced. Joe Hisaishi was also revealed as the composer for the film. On March 13, 2019, the remaining main voice cast for the film was announced.

== Marketing ==
On April 8, 2019, the first trailer of the film was revealed on social media, previewing a minute or so of footage and the voice of Mana Ashida as protagonist Ruka Azumi. On May 9, 2019, the second trailer for the movie was released.

A special talk was held at the National Museum of Nature and Science's exhibition Mammals 2 – Struggle for Life on April 17, 2019, after the museum closed. Daisuke Igarashi and Ayumu Watanabe attended the talk and discussed the dangers and threats wild mammals are facing due to environmental change with a researcher from vertebrate research group of the museum. The short-term exhibition also displays the original manuscript of the Children of the Sea comic and special unused images which were cut out from the movie.

== Release ==
The film had a special public world premiere screening in Tokyo, Japan on May 19, 2019, at Iino Hall and another advance preview screening on May 30 at Toho Cinemas Kinshicho Rakutenchi, both with appearances by staff and cast, before going on general release across Japan on June 7.

Internationally, it had its French premiere on Monday 10, June at the Annecy International Animation Film Festival, competing in the Contrechamp category.

In English-speaking countries, it has been licensed for Australia and New Zealand by Madman Entertainment, who gave the film its Australian premiere on June 15 at Sydney Film Festival, and for the United States and Canada by GKIDS. The film also received a UK premiere at Scotland Loves Anime on October 13, 2019, and would later be picked up by Anime Limited. Following an awards-qualifying run in 2019, a US theatrical release was planned for April 2020, but was postponed due to the closure of theaters during the COVID-19 pandemic. The theatrical release was rescheduled for August, but was ultimately canceled due to the pandemic. The film was released on DVD and Blu-ray Disc on September 1, 2020.

== Music ==
=== Theme song ===
On April 24, 2019, it was announced that Japanese singer-songwriter Kenshi Yonezu would be in charge of the film's theme song. The single, titled "Umi no Yūrei" (海の幽霊; lit."Spirits of the Sea") is written and produced by Yonezu and was released on June 3, 2019. To commemorate the release of the song, a free lottery was held for 100 people to attend the premiere of the song's music video on May 27, 2019, at a secret location in metropolitan Tokyo, which would turn out to be Enoshima Aquarium; the video was then released online the next day, on May 28, 2019.

=== Score ===
The original musical score of the film is composed by Joe Hisaishi, a long-time collaborator of Studio Ghibli. When talking about the film, Hisaishi says "What's interesting about this movie is that it has things you wouldn't expect as story… I stuck to a minimalist music style for the entire picture, so it has been quite a challenge as a film score. The film inspires the viewer's imagination of the universe's memories and the effervescence of life."

This film, together with Ni no Kuni, released two months later, mark Hisaishi's first two scores for animated feature films since 2013's The Tale of the Princess Kaguya, directed by Isao Takahata, and the first non-interactive animated productions not produced by Studio Ghibli with music by Hisaishi since the release of Venus Wars in 1989.

== Reception ==
=== Box office ===
Children of the Sea grossed $2,892,603 during its worldwide theatrical release, with more than $2.2 million of the total earned in Japan.

In the United States, the home-video Blu-ray of Children of the Sea was released on September 1, 2020, and debuted in 18th place on The Numbers weekly sales charts, with 12,260 units sold for a sales total of $183,777; the ranking was the third highest among titles newly released that week. Subsequent sales brought the home-video total to $644,661 as of December 2021.

=== Critical response ===
The review aggregator Rotten Tomatoes reported that 62% of 29 critics gave the film a positive review, with an average rating of 6.9/10. The critics consensus is: "An animated adventure perhaps best appreciated as a visual experience, Children of the Sea is strikingly lovely if less than satisfying on a narrative level." Metacritic assigned the film a weighted average score of 74 out of 100 based on 8 critic reviews, signifying "generally favorable reviews".

Anime-focused website Anime News Network featured responses from four reviewers. Kim Morrissy gave the film a C+ rating, with praise for the visuals and criticism of the "obtuse" nature of the plot. Reviewing the home-video release, Theron Martin rated the film a B−, highlighting the "spectacular visual sequences" but criticizing the film as "too long" and "aimless." In a joint review, Steve Jones and Michelle Liu praised the film, with Jones calling the film "a contender for the best-looking animated film I've ever seen," and Liu heralding the film as "a masterpiece" and "an incredible experience." In his review for Variety, critic Peter Debruge praised the film for its "splendid attention to detail and seemingly boundless imagination," for composer Joe Hisaishi's "lovely" score, and for director Ayumu Watanabe's "stunning adaptation" and exploration of the "age-old tension between those who recognize a rare and fragile being that they wish to protect and the callous impulse to experiment."

=== Accolades ===
Year	Award	Category	Recipient	Result
2020	Mainichi Film Awards	Best Animation Film	Children of the Sea	Won
2020	Japan Media Arts Festival Awards	Animation Division - Grand Prize	Children of the Sea	Won
2020	Buncheon International Animation Film Festival	International Competition - Feature Film - Grand Prize	Children of the Sea	Won
2020	Buncheon International Animation Film Festival	Music Prize - Special Mention	Children of the Sea	Won
