= Little Forest =

Japanese manga series and its adaptations

- First tankōbon volume cover, featuring Ichiko

リトル・フォレスト (Ritoru Foresuto)
- Genre: Cooking; Slice of life
- Manga
- Written by: Daisuke Igarashi
- Published by: Kodansha
- Imprint: Wide KC Afternoon
- Magazine: Monthly Afternoon
- Original run: October 25, 2002 – May 25, 2005
- Volumes: 2
- Live-action film

Little Forest: Summer/Autumn
- Directed by: Junichi Mori
- Produced by: Keiichiro Moriya; Satoko Ishida
- Written by: Junichi Mori
- Music by: Yuri Miyauchi
- Studio: Robot Communications; Little Forest Production Committee
- Released: August 30, 2014
- Runtime: 111 minutes
- Live-action film

Little Forest: Winter/Spring
- Directed by: Junichi Mori
- Produced by: Keiichiro Moriya; Satoko Ishida
- Written by: Junichi Mori
- Music by: Yuri Miyauchi
- Studio: Robot Communications; Little Forest Production Committee
- Released: February 14, 2015
- Runtime: 120 minutes
- Live-action film
- Little Forest (2018)
- icon

Little Forest (Japanese: リトル・フォレスト, Hepburn: Ritoru Foresuto) is a Japanese manga series written and illustrated by Daisuke Igarashi. It was serialized in Kodansha's seinen manga magazine Monthly Afternoon from October 2002 to May 2005, with its chapters collected in two tankōbon volumes. A two-part live action film adaptation premiered in Japan in August 2014 and February 2015, and a live action Korean adaptation was released in February 2018.

== Plot ==
The manga is set in the Tōhoku region. It is about a young girl named Ichiko who returned to Tōhoku, her hometown, after a series of heartbreaking encounters that had happened to her life in the big city. She returned to her and her mother's old house, farming the land and living in accordance with the changing four seasons. Later, she received a letter from her mother and decided to try to "make it" in the city again before settling down and living as a farmer permanently in Tōhoku.

== Characters ==
Ichiko (いち子)
Portrayed by: Ai Hashimoto
Yūta (ユウ太)
Portrayed by: Takahiro Miura
Kikko (キッコ)
Portrayed by: Mayu Matsuoka
Shigeyuki (シゲユキ)
Portrayed by: Yoichi Nukumizu
Sachiko (福子)
Portrayed by: Karen Kirishima

== Media ==
=== Manga ===
Written and illustrated by Daisuke Igarashi, Little Forest was serialized in Kodansha's seinen manga magazine Monthly Afternoon from October 25, 2002, (Note: Debuted in the magazine's December 2002 issue, released on October 25, 2002.) to May 25, 2005. (Note: Finished in the magazine's July 2005 issue, released on May 25, 2005.) Kodansha collected its chapters in two tankōbon volumes, released on August 23, 2004, and August 23, 2005.

=== Live action films ===
A two-part live action film adaptation was announced in January 2014. They were directed and written by Junichi Mori. Food director Yuri Nomura supervised food production, and coached Ai Hashimoto on her cooking in the films. Principal photography lasted one year, with Ōshū, Iwate being one of the places shot on location. The band Flower Flower, led by singer-songwriter Yui, wrote four theme songs for the films, one for each season.

The first film, titled Little Forest: Summer/Autumn (リトル・フォレスト 夏/秋, Ritoru Foresuto: Natsu/Aki), premiered in Japan on August 30, 2014. It was also screened in the Culinary Zinema (Film and Gastronomy) section at the 2014 San Sebastián International Film Festival.

The second film, titled Little Forest: Winter/Spring (リトル・フォレスト 冬/春, Ritoru Foresuto: Fuyu/Haru), premiered in Japan on February 14, 2015. It was also screened in the Kulinarisches Kino (Culinary Cinema) section at the 2015 Berlin International Film Festival.

A Korean live action film adaptation, titled Little Forest and directed by Yim Soon-rye, was released on February 28, 2018.

== Reception ==
The manga was one of the finalists at the 10th Tezuka Osamu Cultural Prize.
