= Mr. Villain's Day Off =

Japanese manga series by Yuu Morikawa

- First tankōbon volume cover

休日のわるものさん (Kyūjitsu no Warumono-san)
- Genre: Comedy
- Manga
- Written by: Yuu Morikawa
- Published by: Square Enix
- English publisher: NA: Square Enix Manga & Books
- Imprint: Gangan Comics Pixiv
- Magazine: Gangan Pixiv
- Original run: December 15, 2018 – present
- Volumes: 8
- Anime television series
- Directed by: Yoshinori Odaka
- Written by: Midori Gotō
- Music by: Nobuaki Nobusawa
- Studio: Shin-Ei Animation; SynergySP
- Licensed by: Crunchyroll
- Original network: TV Tokyo, TVO, BS NTV, AT-X
- Original run: January 8, 2024 – March 25, 2024
- Episodes: 12
- icon

Mr. Villain's Day Off (Japanese: 休日のわるものさん, Hepburn: Kyūjitsu no Warumono-san) is a Japanese manga series written and illustrated by Yuu Morikawa. It has been serialized on the Pixiv website since December 2018, with its chapters collected into eight tankōbon volumes as of April 2026. An anime television series adaptation produced by Shin-Ei Animation and SynergySP aired from January to March 2024.

== Premise ==
One member of an extraterrestrial organization that intends to take over Earth spends his days off from work doing mundane things such as shopping or going to the zoo.

== Characters ==
Warumono-san (わるものさん)
Voiced by: Kenjiro Tsuda (drama CD), Shintarō Asanuma (anime)
Akatsuki Red (アカツキレッド, Akatsuki Reddo)
Voiced by: Kōhei Amasaki (drama CD), Hiiro Ishibashi (anime)
Sora (空)
Voiced by: Chinami Hashimoto (drama CD), Hibiku Yamamura (anime)
Mugi (麦)
Voiced by: Minami Takahashi (drama CD), Hibiku Yamamura (anime)
Rooney (ルーニー, Rūnī)
Voiced by: Takuma Terashima (drama CD), Soma Saito (anime)
Trigger (トリガー, Torigā)
Voiced by: Yuichi Nakamura
Sōten Blue (ソウテンブルー, Sōten Burū)
Voiced by: Takuya Eguchi
Shinonome Pink (シノノメピンク, Shinonome Pinku)
Voiced by: Ai Kakuma
Yoiyami Black (ヨイヤミブラック, Yoiyami Burakku)
Voiced by: Yūichirō Umehara
Yamano (山野)
Voiced by: Nao Tōyama

== Media ==
=== Manga ===
Written and illustrated by Yuu Morikawa, Mr. Villain's Day Off began serialization on the Pixiv website on December 15, 2018. As of April 2026, eight tankōbon volumes have been released by Square Enix under its Gangan Comics Pixiv imprint. A drama CD adaptation was released by Frontier Works on January 27, 2021.

The series is published digitally in English in the global version of Square Enix's Manga Up! website. In March 2023, Square Enix Manga & Books announced that it licensed the series for print publication, with the first volume set to be released on August 15 of the same year.

==== Volumes ====
No.	Original release date	Original ISBN	English release date	English ISBN
1	December 21, 2018	978-4-7575-5951-6	August 15, 2023	978-1-64609-223-9
2	October 21, 2019	978-4-7575-6351-3	November 7, 2023	978-1-64609-224-6
3	September 19, 2020	978-4-7575-6802-0	February 20, 2024	978-1-64609-225-3
4	February 22, 2022	978-4-7575-7752-7	May 14, 2024	978-1-64609-226-0
5	April 21, 2023	978-4-7575-8532-4	August 20, 2024	978-1-64609-269-7
6	January 22, 2024	978-4-7575-8747-2	March 4, 2025	978-1-64609-337-3
7	March 22, 2025	978-4-7575-9638-2	February 17, 2026	978-1-64609-462-2
8	April 22, 2026	978-4-301-00468-4	—	—

=== Anime ===
An anime television series adaptation was announced in February 2023. It is produced by Shin-Ei Animation and SynergySP, and directed by Yoshinori Odaka, with scripts supervised by Midori Gotō, characters designed by Tomomi Shimazaki, and music composed by Nobuaki Nobusawa. The series aired from January 8 to March 25, 2024, on TV Tokyo and other networks. (Note: TV Tokyo lists the series premiere on January 7 at 25:35, which is effectively January 8 at 1:35 a.m. JST.) The opening theme song is "Yūho" (遊歩; lit. 'Walk'), performed by Ivudot, and the ending theme song is "Kyūsoku Jūden" (休息充電; lit. 'Relaxation Charging'), performed by Glasgow. Crunchyroll is streaming the series.

==== Episodes ====
No.	Title	Directed by (Note: Production staff information is taken from the ending credits of each episode.)	Storyboarded by	Animation directed by	Original release date
1	"We Need Comfort Too"; Transliteration: "Warera ni mo Iyashi wa Hitsuyō da" (Japanese: 我らにも癒しは必要だ)	Yoshinori Odaka & Yūtarō Yamamoto	Kunihisa Sugishima	Sonomi Aramaki	January 8, 2024
2	"Earth Is Formidable Indeed"; Transliteration: "Yahari Chikyū wa Anadorenai" (Japanese: やはり地球は侮れない)	Shigeki Awai	Ken'ichi Nishida	Nozomi Kawashige	January 15, 2024
3	"The Fiends of Winter"; Transliteration: "Fuyu no Mamono-tachi" (Japanese: 冬の魔物たち)	Mayu Numayama	Mayu Numayama	Kazuhiro Ohmame	January 22, 2024
4	"When Spring Comes to Town"; Transliteration: "Haru Kuru Machi de" (Japanese: 春くる街で)	Shūji Saitō	Kunihisa Sugishima	Tomomi Shimazaki, Shouko Hagiwara, Sonomi Aramaki & Hajime Yoshida	January 29, 2024
5	"Magical Girl in Distress"; Transliteration: "Mahō Shōjo wa Kunō Suru" (Japanese: 魔法少女は苦悩する。)	Shigeki Awai	Ken'ichi Nishida	Nozomi Kawashige & Miyuki Takahashi	February 5, 2024
6	"Those Who Wish in Summer"; Transliteration: "Natsu ni Negau Mono" (Japanese: 夏に願うもの)	Shigeki Awai	Kunihisa Sugishima	Nozomi Kawashige, Miyuki Takahashi, Michiko Miyamoto & Yū Horie	February 12, 2024
7	"A Pandaful Weekend"; Transliteration: "Pandafuru na Shūmatsu" (Japanese: パンダフルな週末。)	Mayu Numayama	Mayu Numayama	Kazuhiro Ohmame	February 19, 2024
8	"Gifts in the Season of White"; Transliteration: "Shiroi Kisetsu no Okurimono" (Japanese: 白い季節の贈り物)	Matsuo Asami	Ken'ichi Nishida	Tomomi Shimazaki, Shouko Hagiwara, Koichi Konno, Mayumi Watanabe, Sonomi Aramaki & Hajime Yoshida	February 26, 2024
9	"The Way of Desire"; Transliteration: "Yokubō no Yukue" (Japanese: 欲望の行方)	Shūji Saitō	Kunihisa Sugishima	Tomomi Shimazaki, Koichi Konno, Shouko Hagiwara, Hajime Yoshida & Sonomi Aramaki	March 4, 2024
10	"Matters of Justice"; Transliteration: "Seigi no Jijō" (Japanese: 正義の事情)	Shigeki Awai	Kunihisa Sugishima	Miyuki Takahashi, Michiko Miyamoto & Ayaka Yanai	March 11, 2024
11	"When the Flowers Scatter"; Transliteration: "Hana Chiru Koro ni" (Japanese: 花散る頃に)	Mayu Numayama	Mayu Numayama	Kazuhiro Ohmame	March 18, 2024
12	"Somewhere on This Planet"; Transliteration: "Kono Hoshi no Doko ka de" (Japanese: この星のどこかで)	Yoshinori Odaka & Yūtarō Yamamoto	Kunihisa Sugishima	Tomomi Shimazaki, Shouko Hagiwara & Mayumi Watanabe	March 25, 2024
