= Children of the Sea (painting) =

Painting by Jozef Israëls

- Dutch: Kinderen Der Zee
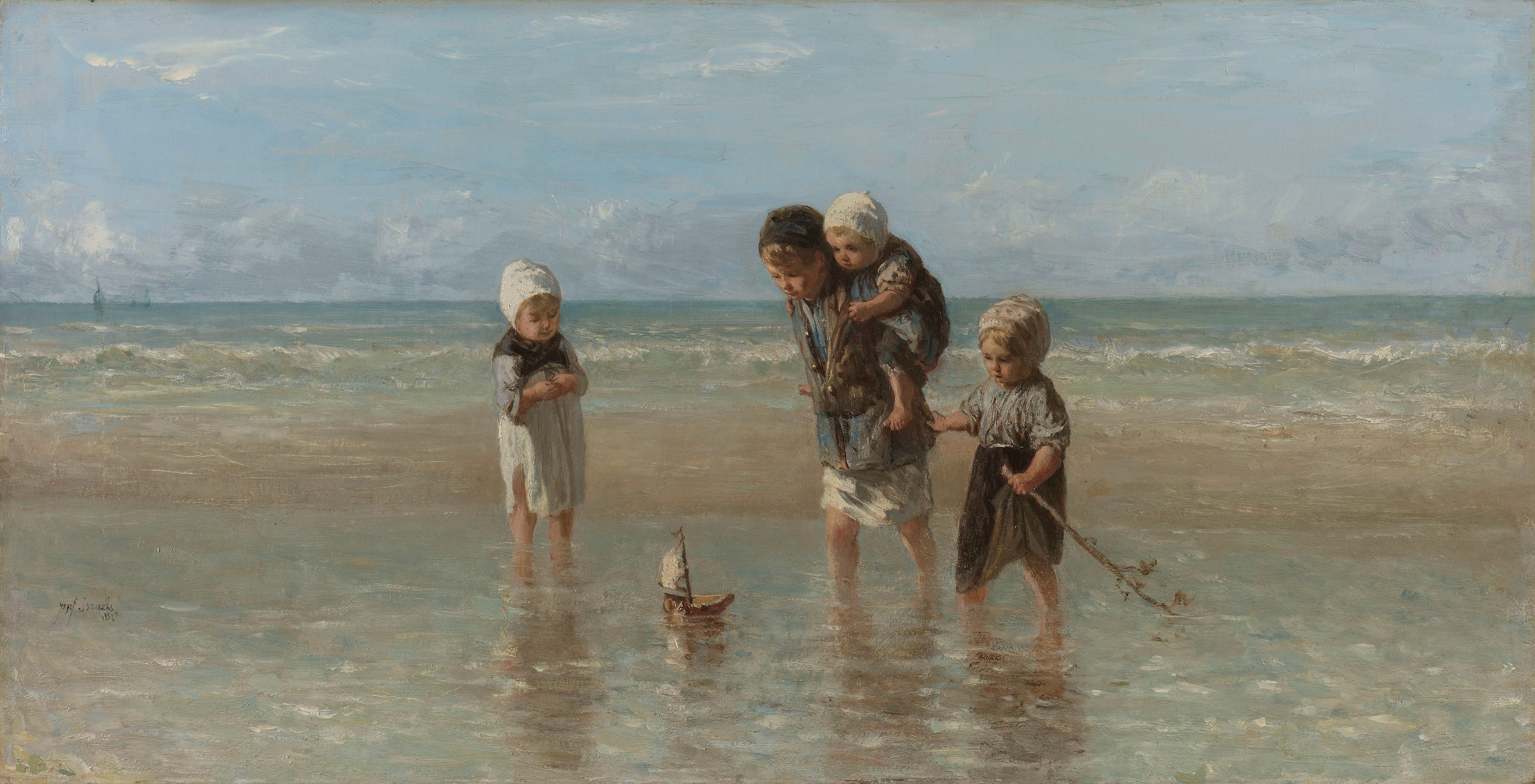
- Artist: Jozef Israëls
- Year: 1872
- Medium: Oil on canvas
- Movement: Realism (arts)
- Dimensions: 48.5 cm × 93.5 cm (19.1 in × 36.8 in)
- Location: Rijksmuseum, Amsterdam
- Website: Children of the Sea

Children of the Sea or Kinderen Der Zee is an 1872 oil-on-canvas painting by the Dutch artist Jozef Israëls. The painting is a depiction of peasant children playing in the ocean.

== History ==
Israëls first painted the subject of Children of the Sea in 1863. The subject was popular and Israëls repeated it in other paintings. In Dutch the painting is known as Kinderen Der Zee. The painting is now in the collections of the Rijksmuseum in Amsterdam.

Many of Israëls's paintings show peasants at work or resting. While documenting the lives and struggles of fishermen he took time to document the joy and innocence of children at play. He created at least 13 different versions or configurations of children playing by the sea.

== Description ==
Children of the Sea portrays children at play, and the toy is a sailing boat in the shallow water. They are children of a fisherman and wear working-class clothing. There are four children; the largest is a boy who carries a younger child on his back.

== Reception ==
The painting appears on the cover of the 2021 book Aus Meinen Kindertagen by Selma Lagerlöf. Another version appears on the cover of Edith Nesbit's 2022 fantasy fiction novel Wet Magic.
