= Designer (disambiguation) =

A designer is a person who designs.

Designer may also refer to:

- Designer (album), a 2019 album by Aldous Harding
- "Designer", a 2022 song by NCT 127 from 2 Baddies
- "Designer", a 2017 song by Kesi

== See also ==
- Desiigner, American rapper
