= Ayumu Watanabe =

Japanese animation director (born 1966)

- 渡辺 歩
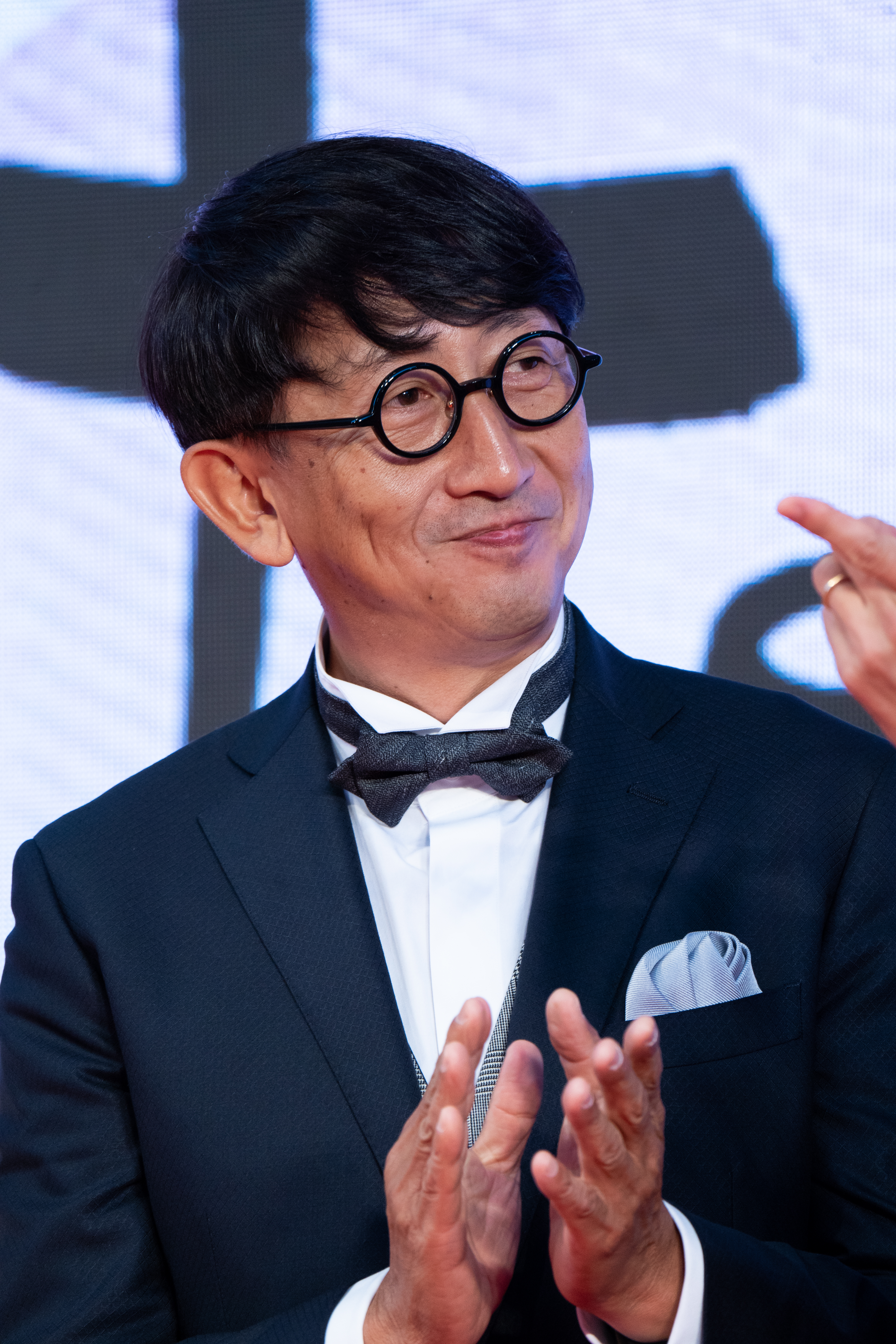
- Watanabe at the Tokyo International Film Festival in 2019
- Born: September 3, 1966 (age 60); Tokyo, Japan
- Occupation: Animation director
- Years active: 1986–present
- Notable work: Doraemon series; Space Brothers; After the Rain; Komi Can't Communicate

Ayumu Watanabe (渡辺 歩, Watanabe Ayumu; born September 3, 1966) is a Japanese animation director. After joining Shin-Ei Animation, he directed multiple Doraemon animated films. As a freelancer, he also worked on numerous animated adaptations such as Space Brothers, After the Rain, and Komi Can't Communicate.

== Biography ==
Ayumu Watanabe was born in Tokyo on September 3, 1966. He started his career in 1986 when he joined Studio Mates as a key animator. Two years later, Watanabe moved to Shin-Ei Animation, where he worked on the animated adaptation of the Doraemon comic series, as well as direct multiple anime films in the franchise. As a freelancer, he also directed numerous animated adaptations such as Space Brothers, After the Rain, and Komi Can't Communicate. He also worked with Studio 4°C on the films Children of the Sea and Fortune Favors Lady Nikuko.

== Works ==
=== TV series ===
- Atashin'chi (2002; storyboards)
- Space Brothers (2012–2014; director)
- Mysterious Girlfriend X (2012; director)
- Danchi Tomoo (2013–2015; director)
- If Her Flag Breaks (2014; director)
- Ace Attorney (2016–2019; director)
- After the Rain (2018; director)
- Gurazeni (2018; director)
- Major 2nd (2018–2020; director)
- Komi Can't Communicate (2021–2022; chief director)
- Summer Time Rendering (2022; director)
- You Are Ms. Servant (2024; director)
- Ganglion (2025; director)
- Akane-banashi (2026–present; director)
- Witch Hat Atelier (2026; director)

=== Films ===
==== Feature films ====
- Doraemon: Nobita and the Windmasters (2003; chief animation director)
- Doraemon: Nobita in the Wan-Nyan Spacetime Odyssey (2004; assistant director, chief animation director)
- Doraemon: Nobita's Dinosaur 2006 (2006; director, screenplay)
- Doraemon: Nobita and the Green Giant Legend (2008; director)
- Space Brothers #0 (2014; director)
- Children of the Sea (2019; director)
- Fortune Favors Lady Nikuko (2021; director)
- Freedom in the Sky (TBA; director)

==== Short films ====
- Doraemon Comes Back (1998; director, animation director)
- Nobita's the Night Before a Wedding (1999; director, animation director)
- A Grandmother's Recollections (2000; director, animation director)
- Good Luck! Gian!! (2001; director)
- The Day When I Was Born (2002; director)
- Pa-Pa-Pa the Movie: Perman (2003; director, screenplay)
- Pa-Pa-Pa the Movie: Perman: Tako de Pon! Ashi wa Pon! (2004; director)
- Ōkii Ichinensei to Chiisana Ninensei (2014; director)

=== OVAs ===
- Magical Princess Minky Momo: A Duo of Sincerity Toward a Dream of Longing (TBA; director)

== Awards and nominations ==
Awards and nominations received by Ayumu Watanabe
Award	Year	Category	Recipient(s)	Result	Ref.
Annie Awards	2022	Best Animated Feature – Independent	Fortune Favors Lady Nikuko	Nominated	
Hochi Film Awards	2021	Best Animated Picture	Fortune Favors Lady Nikuko	Won	
Japan Academy Film Prize	2022	Animation of the Year	Fortune Favors Lady Nikuko	Nominated	
Japan Media Arts Festival	2020	Grand Prize (Animation Division)	Children of the Sea	Won	
Japan Media Arts Festival	2022	Excellence Award (Animation Division)	Fortune Favors Lady Nikuko	Won	
Mainichi Film Awards	2000	Best Animation Film	Doraemon: A Grandmother's Recollections	Won	
Mainichi Film Awards	2020	Best Animation Film	Children of the Sea	Won	
