= By Design (disambiguation) =

By Design is a 1982 Canadian comedy-drama film.

By Design may also refer to:

- By Design: A Hollywood Novel, a novel by Richard E. Grant
- By Design, an album by Design
- “By Design”, a song by Kid Cudi from the album Passion, Pain & Demon Slayin'
- By Design (2025 film), an American drama film
