= Interior Design (disambiguation) =

Interior design is the process of shaping the experience of interior space, through the manipulation of spatial volume as well as surface treatment.

Interior Design may also refer to:

- Interior Design (magazine), an American interior design magazine
- Interior Design (album), a 1988 album by the band Sparks
