= Hiiro Ishibashi =

Japanese voice actor (born 2004)

- 石橋 陽彩
- Born: 24 August 2004 (age 22)
- Occupation: Actor
- Years active: 2016–present
- Employer: Avex Pictures
- Notable work: Coco as the Japanese voice of Miguel; Children of the Sea as Umi; Yu-Gi-Oh! Sevens as Yuga Ohdo; The Fragrant Flower Blooms with Dignity as Ayato Yorita; Mr. Villain's Day Off as Akatsuki Red; Shinkalion: Change the World as Taisei Onari

Hiiro Ishibashi (石橋 陽彩, Ishibashi Hiiro; born 24 August 2004) is a Japanese actor from Chiba Prefecture, affiliated with Avex Pictures. He is known for starring as Miguel in the Japanese dub of Coco (2017), Umi in Children of the Sea (2019), Yuga Ohdo in Yu-Gi-Oh! Sevens, Ayato Yorita in The Fragrant Flower Blooms with Dignity, Akatsuki Red in Mr. Villain's Day Off, and Taisei Onari in Shinkalion: Change the World.

== Biography ==
Hiiro Ishibashi, a native of Chiba Prefecture, was born on 24 August 2004. He began taking vocal and dance lessons as a young toddler at Avex Academy Tokyo. In 2015, he won the singing grand prize at Avex's Kira Challenge. He is also a rapper, appearing as one in "Risk Battle", a 2016 commercial for Dai-ichi Life's U-29 Risk Survey. In 2017, he appeared in Toho x Horipro's production of Frankenstein as Little Victor and in Banyu Inryoku's production of Shintokumaru as a singing soprano.

In 2018, he made his voice acting debut, dubbing the main character Miguel in the Japanese dub of the 2017 Pixar film Coco. He starred as Umi in the 2019 film Children of the Sea. In 2020, he made his anime television debut as the main character Yuga Ohdo in Yu-Gi-Oh! Sevens. In 2024, he began starring as Akatsuki Red in Mr. Villain's Day Off and Taisei Onari in Shinkalion: Change the World. He is also well known for voicing Ayato Yorita in The Fragrant Flower Blooms with Dignity in 2025.

== Filmography ==
=== Television animation ===
Year	Work	Role	Ref.
2020	Yu-Gi-Oh! Sevens	Yuga Ohdo	
2024	Himitsu no AiPri	Hinata Aozora, Yuuma	
2024	Mr. Villain's Day Off	Akatsuki Red	
2024	Pokémon Horizons: The Series	Yanga	
2024	Shinkalion: Change the World	Taisei Onari	
2024	The Prince of Tennis II: U-17 World Cup Semifinal	Henri Nobel III	
2025	The Fragrant Flower Blooms with Dignity	Ayato Yorita	
2025	My Hero Academia: Final Season	Koki Terumoto	
2026	Yoroi-Shinden Samurai Troopers	Gai	
2026	Ghost Concert: Missing Songs	Fighter	
2026	The Food Diary of Miss Maid	Taro Urashima	
2026	Witch Hat Atelier	Euini	
2026	Wistoria: Wand and Sword	Auron Cheek	
2026	Jaadugar: A Witch in Mongolia	Kublai	
2026	Liar Game	Kinoshita	
2026	Flaming Dodgeball Girl Danko	Child	
2026	Yoroi-Shinden Samurai Troopers	Gai	
2026	Skeleton Knight in Another World	Sil	
2026	Sgt. Frog☆	Mutsumi Hōjō	
2026	The Salty Koharu Has a Soft Spot for Me	Sōta Oshio	
2026	Horror Collector	Fushigi Senno	
2027	Isshiki-san Wants to Know About Love	Chikai Matsumoto	

=== Animated film ===
Year	Work	Role	Ref.
2019	Children of the Sea	Umi	
2025	100 Meters	Morikawa	
2026	To You in the Beyond	Kazuki Tsukigase	

=== Stage productions ===
Year	Work	Role	Ref.
2017	Toho x Horipro's Frankenstein	Little Victor	
2017	Banyu Inryoku's Shintokumaru	Singing soprano	
2023	Colorful	Saotome-kun	

=== Video games ===
Year	Work	Role	Ref.
2026	Arknights: Endfield	Lifeng	
2026	Kyoto Xanadu	Rei Kamiya	
