= Designs (manga) =

Japanese manga series

- First tankōbon volume cover

ディザインズ (Dizainzu)
- Genre: Science fiction
- Manga
- Written by: Daisuke Igarashi
- Published by: Kodansha
- Imprint: Afternoon KC
- Magazine: Monthly Afternoon
- Original run: April 25, 2015 – March 25, 2019
- Volumes: 5
- icon

Designs (Japanese: ディザインズ, Hepburn: Dizainzu) is a Japanese manga series written and illustrated by Daisuke Igarashi. It was serialized in Kodansha's seinen manga magazine Monthly Afternoon from April 2015 to March 2019, with its chapters collected in five tankōbon volumes. The series revolved around genetically engineered humanized animals.

== Publication ==
Written and illustrated by Daisuke Igarashi, Designs was serialized in Kodansha's seinen manga magazine Monthly Afternoon from April 25, 2015, to March 25, 2019. Kodansha collected its chapters in five tankōbon volumes, released from February 23, 2016, to November 22, 2019.

=== Volumes ===
No.	Japanese release date	Japanese ISBN
1	February 23, 2016	978-4-06-388124-0
2	March 23, 2017	978-4-06-388246-9
3	January 23, 2018	978-4-06-510776-8
4	October 23, 2019	978-4-06-517177-6
5	November 22, 2019	978-4-06-517484-5

== Reception ==
The series ranked ninth on "The Best Manga 2017 Kono Manga wo Yome!" ranking by Freestyle magazine. Designs was nominated for the Yomiuri Shimbun's Sugoi Japan Award 2017. The series ranked eighteenth on Takarajimasha's Kono Manga ga Sugoi! guidebook 2017 list of top manga for male readers.
