= Seishū Uragami =

Japanese actor (born 1999)

Seishuu Uragami
- 浦上 晟周
- Born: November 23, 1999 (age 26); Tokyo, Japan
- Occupation: Actor
- Years active: 2009–present
- Agent: Amuse, Inc.
- Known for: N St; Kazoku Game
- Website: Official profile

Seishuu Uragami (浦上 晟周, Uragami Seishū; born November 23, 1999, in Tokyo, Japan) is a Japanese actor and tarento represented by Amuse, Inc.

== Filmography ==
=== Television ===
| Year | Title | Role | Notes | Ref. |
|---|---|---|---|---|
| 2016 | Sanada Maru | Sanada Daisuke | Taiga drama | |
| 2019 | Sherlock: Untold Stories | Ryosuke Ukai | Episode 10 | |

=== Films ===
| Year | Title | Role | Notes | Ref. |
|---|---|---|---|---|
| 2019 | I Wanted to Meet You | Takeshi Yamauchi | | |
| 2019 | Children of the Sea | Sora (voice) | | |
| 2021 | Hokusai | Sharaku Toshusai | | |
| 2026 | Kyojo: Reunion | Wataru Ishiguro | | |
| 2026 | Kyojo: Requiem | Wataru Ishiguro | | |
