= After the Rain (manga) =

Japanese manga series and its franchise

- First tankōbon volume cover, featuring Akira Tachibana

恋は雨上がりのように (Koi wa Ameagari no Yō ni)
- Genre: Coming-of-age; Romance; Slice of life
- Manga
- Written by: Jun Mayuzuki
- Published by: Shogakukan; Shueisha (new edition)
- English publisher: NA: Vertical
- Imprint: Big Comics; Young Jump Comics (new edition)
- Magazine: Monthly Big Comic Spirits (2014–2015); Weekly Big Comic Spirits (2016–2018)
- Original run: June 27, 2014 – March 19, 2018
- Volumes: 10
- Anime television series
- Directed by: Ayumu Watanabe
- Produced by: Taku Matsuo; Gō Wakabayashi
- Written by: Deko Akao
- Music by: Ryō Yoshimata
- Studio: Wit Studio
- Licensed by: Amazon Prime Video (streaming); NA: Sentai Filmworks; UK: MVM Films
- Original network: Fuji TV (Noitamina)
- Original run: January 12, 2018 – March 30, 2018
- Episodes: 12
- Live-action film
- Directed by: Akira Nagai
- Produced by: Kei Haruna; Hiroaki Ishiguro; Yūho Tadano
- Written by: Riko Sakaguchi
- Music by: Goro Ito
- Studio: Toho
- Released: May 25, 2018
- Runtime: 111 minutes
- icon

After the Rain (Japanese: 恋は雨上がりのように, Hepburn: Koi wa Ameagari no Yō ni; lit. 'Love Is Like After the Rain') is a Japanese manga series written and illustrated by Jun Mayuzuki. It was serialized in Shogakukan's Monthly Big Comic Spirits magazine from June 2014 to November 2015, and later in Weekly Big Comic Spirits from January 2016 to March 2018. Its chapters were collected in ten tankōbon volumes. In North America, Vertical licensed the manga and published it in a five-volume omnibus edition from September 2018 to September 2019.

A 12-episode anime television series adaptation by Wit Studio aired from January to March 2018 on Fuji TV's Noitamina programming block. A live-action film adaptation was released in May 2018. The anime series has been licensed in English by Sentai Filmworks for home video and digital release.

By April 2018, the manga had over two million copies in circulation. In 2018, After the Rain won the 63rd Shogakukan Manga Award in the general category.

== Synopsis ==
Akira Tachibana, a high school student working part-time at a family restaurant, starts falling in love with the manager, Masami Kondo, a forty-five-year-old divorcé with a young son. Akira struggles to determine why she is falling for Masami, and whether or not to reveal her feelings to him.

== Characters ==
Akira Tachibana (橘 あきら, Tachibana Akira)
Voiced by: Sayumi Watabe (Japanese); Luci Christian (English)
Portrayed by: Nana Komatsu
A high school student with a piercing expression that makes many people slightly wary of her. She used to be part of the track team, before a leg injury forced her to give up running. Having fallen into a depression, she met Masami who acted in a kind and friendly manner, offering her a free coffee when she took shelter at the restaurant in the rain; his act of kindness began her infatuation with him. Despite her cold and inapproachable demeanor, she is actually rather timid and shy, especially when it comes to Masami.
Masami Kondo/Manager (近藤 正己/店長, Kondō Masami/Tenchō)
Voiced by: Hiroaki Hirata (Japanese); Jason Douglas (English)
Portrayed by: Yo Oizumi
A 45-year-old manager of a family restaurant. A kind, timid man, he is often criticized by his employees for being too weak. He is divorced and has a young son named Yuto. He is initially rather intimidated by Akira, whom he assumes actually hates him, while she, in fact, is merely staring at him in love. He is a fan of "Pure Literature" and loves reading books. Prior to becoming a restaurant manager, he wrote novels alongside his former college buddy and now-renowned writer Chihiro Kujo.
Haruka Kyan (喜屋武 はるか, Kyan Haruka)
Voiced by: Emi Miyajima (Japanese); Elizabeth Maxwell (English)
Portrayed by: Nana Seino
Akira's buddy on the track team, who remains steadfast in maintaining their friendship after Akira's injury.
Yui Nishida (西田 ユイ, Nishida Yui)
Voiced by: Haruka Fukuhara (Japanese); Maggie Flecknoe (English)
Portrayed by: Honoka Matsumoto
Akira's coworker at the restaurant who has blonde hair and a cheerful personality. She has a crush on Takashi.
Ryosuke Kase (加瀬 亮介, Kase Ryōsuke)
Voiced by: Tomoaki Maeno (Japanese); Jason Liebrecht (English)
Portrayed by: Hayato Isomura
A chef at the restaurant who had a sexual interest in Akira. When he learns about Akira's infatuation with Masami, he blackmails her by forcing her to date him in order to keep her secret intact.
Takashi Yoshizawa (吉澤 タカシ, Yoshizawa Takashi)
Voiced by: Junya Ikeda (Japanese); Gareth West (English)
Portrayed by: Shono Hayama
Akira's classmate who had a crush on her. He also works at the restaurant with Akira as kitchen staff.
Kayoko Kubo (久保 佳代子, Kubo Kayoko)
Voiced by: Mika Kanai (Japanese); Patricia Duran (English)
Portrayed by: Mari Hamada
An older, brusque, and more seasoned waitress at the restaurant where Akira works. She is constantly disparaging towards Masami, and acts as a sort of class prefect among the younger staff.
Yuto Kondo (近藤 ゆと, Kondo Yuto)
Voiced by: Junko Takeuchi (Japanese); Kira Vincent-Davis (English)
Masami's young son who attends elementary school.
Chihiro Kujo (九条 千尋, Kujo Chihiro)
Voiced by: Mitsuru Miyamoto (Japanese); Joe Daniels (English)
Portrayed by: Shigeyuki Totsugi
Masami's friend from college who is a renowned writer.

== Media ==
=== Manga ===
Written and illustrated by Jun Mayuzuki, After the Rain was first serialized in Shogakukan's Monthly Big Comic Spirits from June 27, 2014, to November 27, 2015. It was then transferred to Weekly Big Comic Spirits, where it ran from January 18, 2016, to March 19, 2018. Shogakukan collected its chapters in ten tankōbon volumes, published from January 9, 2015, to April 27, 2018. Shueisha re-released the series a five-volume shinsōban edition volumes from April 17 to May 19, 2025.

In March 2018, it was announced that Vertical licensed the manga for an English language release in North America. The manga was released in five omnibus edition volumes from September 25, 2018, to September 17, 2019.

==== Volumes ====
| No. | Original release date | Original ISBN | English release date | English ISBN |
|---|---|---|---|---|
| 1 | January 9, 2015 | 978-4-09-186728-5 | September 25, 2018 | 978-1-94-719434-2 |
| 2 | April 10, 2015 | 978-4-09-186868-8 | September 25, 2018 | 978-1-94-719434-2 |
| 3 | September 11, 2015 | 978-4-09-187200-5 | December 18, 2018 | 978-1-94-719436-6 |
| 4 | January 12, 2016 | 978-4-09-187417-7 | December 18, 2018 | 978-1-94-719436-6 |
| 5 | June 10, 2016 | 978-4-09-187629-4 | March 12, 2019 | 978-1-94-719452-6 |
| 6 | October 12, 2016 | 978-4-09-187798-7 | March 12, 2019 | 978-1-94-719452-6 |
| 7 | March 10, 2017 | 978-4-09-189389-5 | June 4, 2019 | 978-1-94-719459-5 |
| 8 | July 12, 2017 | 978-4-09-189546-2 | June 4, 2019 | 978-1-94-719459-5 |
| 9 | November 10, 2017 | 978-4-09-189656-8 | September 17, 2019 | 978-1-94-719477-9 |
| 10 | April 27, 2018 | 978-4-09-189793-0 | September 17, 2019 | 978-1-94-719477-9 |

=== Anime ===
An anime television series adaptation was announced in March 2017. Produced by Fuji Television, Aniplex, DMM pictures, Dentsu and Wit Studio; the series is directed by Ayumu Watanabe, with Deko Akao handling series composition, Yuka Shibata designing the characters and Ryō Yoshimata composing the music. The opening theme song is "Nostalgic Rainfall" by CHiCO with HoneyWorks, while the ending theme song is "Ref:rain" by Aimer. It ran for 12 episodes from January 12 to March 30, 2018, on Fuji TV's Noitamina programming block.

Amazon streamed the series worldwide on their Amazon Video service. In March 2020, Sentai Filmworks announced the acquisition of the series for home video and digital release in North America. In the United Kingdom, the series is licensed by MVM Films and it was released on Blu-ray on October 26, 2020.

==== Episodes ====
| No. | English title (Note: All English titles are taken from Amazon Video.) Original Japanese title | Directed by | Written by | Original release date |
|---|---|---|---|---|
| 1 | "The Sound of Rain" "Amaoto" (Japanese: 雨音) | Ayako Kawano | Deko Akao | January 12, 2018 |
Akira Tachibana works at Cafe Restaurant Garden, managed by Masami Kondo, whom her coworkers consider somewhat pathetic due to his habit of excessively apologizing to customers; during a break in the office, she encounters Kondo's son, Yuto, doing homework and teaches him to play the recorder outside the restaurant, later meeting her former track club teammate Haruka at school to discuss an upcoming tournament. On another break, Tachibana notices Kondo's shirt draped over a chair, which reminds her of her first visit to the café when he treated her kindly on a rainy day with free coffee and a magic trick; overcome with nostalgia, she sniffs the shirt, only for Kondo to return and catch her, leaving her flustered as she quickly returns it and resumes her break, blushing under his gaze.
| 2 | "Rain Drops on Green Leaves" "Aoba Ame" (Japanese: 青葉雨) | Shingo Uchida | Deko Akao | January 19, 2018 |
Kondo hires Yoshizawa, Tachibana's classmate, as a new part-timer, with Yui immediately developing a crush on him. During a quiet shift, Yui asks Tachibana to name things that make her heart race, but she hesitates when noticing Kondo nearby. When a customer forgets his phone, Kondo's attempts to alert the departing bicyclist fail, prompting Tachibana to chase after him and successfully return it, though she later collapses from ankle pain. Kondo takes her to a clinic, and afterward she reflects on the day's events. That evening, he calls to check on her, then visits the next day to apologize to her mother. During this visit, Tachibana accidentally confesses her feelings, which Kondo misunderstands as general affection rather than romantic love.
| 3 | "Raining Tears" "Ame Shizuku" (Japanese: 雨雫) | Ayako Kawano | Deko Akao | January 26, 2018 |
Troubled by her poorly-worded confession, Tachibana reflects on it while walking home from school. A track team member spots her and convinces her to visit the field, where memories of her former participation overwhelm her. When the team suggests eating at her workplace, she initially refuses before weakly claiming the distance is too great. Departing in the rain, she recalls both her track injury and her first meeting with Kondo. As the downpour intensifies, Kondo steps outside for a smoke and encounters her. Despite his attempts to usher her inside, she repeats her confession before leaving him stunned in the doorway. The next day, her normal demeanor leaves Kondo questioning whether the incident occurred. Later, while driving her to the station, he attempts to dissuade her feelings, maintaining his misinterpretation of her confession as transient admiration rather than genuine romantic affection.
| 4 | "Gentle Rain" "Sozoro Ame" (Japanese: 漫ろ雨) | Ryō Andō | Yūichirō Kido | February 2, 2018 |
Tachibana confronts Kondo about his proposal that they go on a date to prove their incompatibility; though he insists it was hypothetical, she persists until he reluctantly agrees. Meanwhile, her coworker Kase develops inappropriate fantasies about her and, after discovering doodles in her textbook that reveal her feelings for Kondo, blackmails her into a date in exchange for his silence. While both dates occur at the same location, Tachibana finds Kase's advances repulsive, whereas her time with Kondo feels effortless and fulfilling. Afterward, Kase urges her to abandon her pursuit of Kondo and seek someone her own age. When Kondo returns to the restaurant, he assumes she disliked their outing, unaware of her genuine enjoyment. The contrast between the two experiences reinforces Tachibana's feelings while complicating Kondo's attempts to dissuade her.
| 5 | "The Scent of Rain" "Kōu" (Japanese: 香雨) | Yasuhiro Akamatsu | Eiji Umehara | February 9, 2018 |
Yuto introduces his new hamster to the café staff and announces plans to walk home alone, prompting Tachibana to escort him when her shift ends. Finding Kondo absent, she prepares dinner while Yuto shares details about his father's literary interests. Upon Kondo's return, Yuto convinces Tachibana to hide in a closet as a surprise; she emerges overheated and collapses, leading Yuto to accidentally spill a drink on her. Kondo lends her a T-shirt and leaves for the laundromat, but when rain begins, Tachibana and Yuto deliver an umbrella, during which she voices her wish to understand him better. Later, the staff playfully bond with Kondo over the hamster—a rare moment of camaraderie he embraces until Tachibana sternly resumes work. Before leaving, she assures him she is available for future hamster-related assistance, subtly reinforcing her emotional connection.
| 6 | "Fine Rain" "Sau" (Japanese: 沙雨) | Hiro Kaburagi | Yūichirō Kido | February 16, 2018 |
While observing Tachibana with Yui, Haruka reflects on their shared history attending the same high school. Tachibana overhears a rumor about a rare keychain charm bringing romantic luck and unsuccessfully attempts to obtain one from a dispenser. Haruka joins her, recalling how they both became runners, and later acquires the coveted charm which she gifts to Tachibana along with a friendship note. Later at the library, Tachibana encounters Kondo and requests book recommendations, but he suggests she choose based on personal interest instead. When Kondo discovers a book by a familiar author, his mood visibly sours. Noticing this, Tachibana checks out that book for him along with several for herself, subtly demonstrating her attentiveness to his emotional state while pursuing her own literary interests.
| 7 | "Heavy Rain" "Jin'u" (Japanese: 迅雨) | Yūta Maruyama; Ayako Kawano; Yasuhiro Akamatsu | Deko Akao | February 23, 2018 |
The restaurant staff discuss creating a group chat while Kondo reads the borrowed book during downtime. Tachibana considers asking to exchange messages with him but instead inquires about the book, learning it was written by a friend. Though impressed by this connection, she is met with his dismissive attitude. Later, her mother urges her to skip work due to an approaching typhoon, but Tachibana refuses, only to find Kondo absent due to illness. During her break, Kase confronts her in the office, arguing that her pursuit of Kondo is causing him distress. Undeterred, she braves the typhoon to visit Kondo's apartment, where she directly asks if her feelings trouble him. He denies this and offers a comforting embrace, though frames it platonically. The next day, Tachibana falls ill with the same cold and privately reflects on their moment with romantic longing.
| 8 | "Quiet Rain" "Seiu" (Japanese: 静雨) | Yasuhiro Akamatsu | Eiji Umehara | March 2, 2018 |
Kondo firmly reiterates his friendship with Tachibana during their shift. When Yoshizawa complains about Kondo criticizing his hairstyle, Yui seizes the opportunity to offer a haircut, pretending to have professional skills to get closer to him. She later confesses her inexperience to Tachibana, who motivates her by sharing her own experiences pursuing Kondo. Emboldened, Tachibana asks Kondo to exchange texts as friends. Elsewhere, Haruka encounters Yamamoto, her school's former soccer captain, and panics when he mentions Tachibana. Discovering his career-ending knee injury, she voices her fear that Tachibana will not return to track, but Yamamoto comforts her with his personal perspective. Back at the restaurant, Tachibana and Kondo discuss Ryūnosuke Akutagawa's Rashōmon, debating the servant's ethical choice and their own potential actions in his position. The day concludes with Tachibana reaching out to Haruka, inviting her to a festival in a gesture of reconciliation.
| 9 | "Rain of Sorrow" "Shūu" (Japanese: 愁雨) | Yūta Maruyama; Yoshihide Ibata; Ayako Kawano | Eiji Umehara | March 9, 2018 |
At the festival, Tachibana and Haruka reconnect until Tachibana notices Kondo attending with his son. Haruka discerns her feelings, but Tachibana deflects the conversation, leading Haruka to accuse her of damaging their friendship by refusing to return to how things were. Distraught, Haruka departs. Meanwhile, Kondo visits a restaurant from his college days, reuniting with Chihiro, his former classmate. They discuss his published book and reminisce about their student years, with Kondo confessing he still writes privately. At school, Haruka avoids Tachibana, who later confides in Kondo about the rift at work. Noticing her sadness, he points out the super moon and shares how his reunion with Chihiro proved relationships can rekindle despite distance. Drawing parallels to her situation, he encourages her to reconcile with Haruka. Inspired, Tachibana makes a wish on the moon, symbolizing her hope for their friendship's renewal.
| 10 | "Sudden Shower" "Hakuu" (Japanese: 白雨) | Shingo Uchida | Yūichirō Kido | March 16, 2018 |
Tachibana invites Kondo to a secondhand book fair for recommendations. There, they meet a bookstore owner who shares the anecdote of Victor Hugo's brief correspondence about Les Misérables ("?" replied with "!"). When Kondo wanders off, Tachibana texts him, mirroring the exchange. Meanwhile, Haruka struggles with their estrangement, while Tachibana, cleared by her doctor to resume athletic activity, declines rehabilitation for track. Kondo later sees Chihiro in a TV interview, reflecting on their diverging paths as writers. In a book from the fair, they find a swallow-shaped bookmark, prompting Kondo to recall a nest once outside the café. Tachibana muses about a swallow choosing to stay, to which Kondo responds that while contentment might be found in staying, the bird would always yearn for the sky. She then encourages him to return to writing, expressing eagerness to read his work—a quiet acknowledgment of both their unfulfilled aspirations.
| 11 | "Passing Shower" "Sōu" (Japanese: 叢雨) | Ayako Kawano; Yasuhiro Akamatsu | Deko Akao | March 23, 2018 |
During track practice, Haruka learns that Nan High's Kurata achieved a personal best in the 100-meter race despite sharing Tachibana's injury, strengthening her resolve to reconnect. Meanwhile, Kondo hesitates to approve Tachibana's November shift schedule, concerned she has dedicating too much time to work. Haruka visits the café and confronts Tachibana with Kurata's story, urging her to return to track. Elsewhere, Kondo reunites with Chihiro after learning his novel is being adapted into a film. Over coffee, they discuss writing: Chihiro confesses he dislikes the book but wrote it for popularity, while Kondo admits he's avoided returning to his craft. Challenged by Chihiro's remark that he "won't" rather than "can't", Kondo resumes writing that night. The next day, he presses Tachibana once more about her aspirations beyond the café. When she defiantly insists she has none, their parallel struggles with self-imposed limitations come into sharper focus.
| 12 | "After the Rain" "Tsuyu no Ato Saki" (Japanese: つゆのあとさき) | Ryōji Masuyama; Ayako Kawano | Deko Akao | March 30, 2018 |
Regretting her confrontation, Haruka reflects on their shared dream of running together at Kazu High. Meanwhile, Tachibana nearly discards her career survey but reconsiders. As speculation grows about Kondo's frequent head office visits—later revealed as menu development—he dedicates nights to writing. Yui, while cutting Yoshizawa's hair, admits he inspired her career choice; he supports her pursuit. During a break, Yuto asks Tachibana for running advice, explaining his promise to his father. Kondo connects this to his own writing pledge and gently probes if she is neglecting a similar vow. Later, reviewing photos with Haruka, Tachibana studies a rehabilitation guide. When Kondo forgets his binder, she chases after him. After an embrace, they agree to update each other on their promises—hers to return to track (confirmed via text to Haruka), his to complete his novel. The story closes with Kondo retrieving his manuscript, After the Rain, symbolizing their parallel journeys toward fulfillment.

=== Live-action film ===
A live-action film adaptation of the manga was announced in November 2017. It stars Nana Komatsu as Akira Tachibana and Yo Oizumi as the manager Masami Kondo. The film was distributed by Toho and premiered on May 25, 2018.

== Reception ==
By April 2018, After the Rain had over two million copies in circulation.

In 2018, alongside Kūbo Ibuki, After the Rain won the 63rd Shogakukan Manga Award in the general category. The manga was ranked fourth in the 2016 edition of Takarajimasha's Kono Manga ga Sugoi! guidebook. In 2016, the manga was nominated for the ninth Manga Taishō Awards, and ranked seventh with 42 points. After the Rain ranked fourth on the "Nationwide Bookstore Employees' Recommended Comics" in 2016.
