= List of Playlist Studio works =

This is a list of works (films, television, shorts, etc.) by the South Korean production company Playlist Studio.

== Films ==
Title	Release date	Director(s)	Screenwriter(s)	Producer(s)	Note(s)
Broject	December 29, 2018	Joo Sung-min	Shin Soo-ji	Kim Tae-hyun	Split into 2 parts
Love Buzz	April 27, 2019	Kim Ha-jin, Baek Hae-sun	Carrot	Kim Jun-mo, Jang Hyun-ho	

== Television series ==
Series	Ep.	Release date		Director(s)	Screenwriter(s)	Producer(s)	Note(s)
Series	Ep.	First released	Last released	Director(s)	Screenwriter(s)	Producer(s)	Note(s)
Yellow (옐로우)	10	September 12, 2017	October 12, 2017	Han Kwang-young; Baek Min-hee	Bang Yoo-jun	Bae Sung-hoon; Bae Ji-hoon	
Hello Stranger: Pilot (헬로 스트레인저 파일럿)	2	December 21, 2017	December 23, 2017	—N/a			Television pilot series
Go Back Diary: Pilot (고, 백 다이어리 파일럿)	4	August 30, 2018	September 8, 2018	—N/a			Television pilot series
Want More 19 (하지 말라면 더 하고 19)	7	October 24, 2018	November 14, 2018	Kim Ha-jin	Choi Yo-ji	Baek Hae-sun; Yoon So-young	
WHY: The Real Reason You Got Dumped (와이: 당신이 연인에게 차인 진짜 이유)	10	November 10, 2018	December 13, 2018	Shin Wan-seok	Kim Soo-min	Park Jin-ho; Yang So-young; Kim Ban-ya; Kim Hye-mi	
The Guilty Secret (다시 만난 너)	12	September 8, 2019	October 17, 2019	Wang Hye-ryeong	Choi Yoji; Kim Jae-hyeok	Kim Jun-mo; Kim Tae-hyun; Kang Min-kyoung	
Dear My Name (나의 이름에게)	6	November 2, 2019	November 20, 2019	Joo Sung-min; Kim Soo-jung	Choi Yoo-jung	Song Joo-sung; Seo Jung-hyun; Chang Sun-hee	
XX (엑스엑스)	10	January 24, 2020	February 21, 2020	Kim Jun-mo	Lee Seul	Bae Sung-hoon; Park Seo-young; Yang Ji-won	
Pop Out Boy! (만찢남녀)	10	June 24, 2020	July 23, 2020	Wang Hye-ryeong	Choi Yoji	Han Ah-reum; Lee Eun-seo; Chang Sun-hee	
Twenty-Twenty (트웬티트웬티)	20	August 15, 2020	October 21, 2020	Han Soo-ji	Sung So-eun	Lee Dong-jun; Lee Yoon-jae; Jung Dong-hyun; Son Young-seok	
Let Me Off the Earth (내리겠습니다 지구에서)	45	September 11, 2020	August 6, 2021	Kim Jun-mo; Wang Hye-ryeong; Kang Min-kyoung; Hong Ji-su; Yim Jung-seob	Jung Su-yoo; Lee Ye-dam; Chae Hye-won	Lee Dong-jun; Hong Chae-beom; Chang Sun-hee; Lee Yoon-jae	
My Fuxxxxx Romance (마이 퍽킹 로맨스)	6	October 11, 2020	October 29, 2020	Baek Min-hee	Ando	Yang So-young	
Live On (라이브온)	8	November 17, 2020	January 12, 2021	Kim Sang-woo	Bang Yoo-jung	Jang Young-jun; Kim Du-ru; Chun Hye-seung; Park Sun-hyung	
Blue Birthday (블루버스데이)	16	July 23, 2021	September 11, 2021	Park Dan-hee	Goo So-yeon; Moon Won-young	Yang So-young; Choi Bit-na; Kim Se-jong	A movie format was released on CGV, premiered on January 19, 2022.
Peng (팽)	10	October 7, 2021	November 5, 2021	Han Soo-ji; Baek Min-hee		Choi Seong-ok; Yang Ji-won; Shin Ye-seul	
A DeadbEAT's Meal (백수세끼)	12	December 10, 2021	January 14, 2022	Kim Jun-mo	Jeon Seon-young	Lee Ha-lim; Jung-Hee-jin; Jung Dong-hyun; Wang Ji-min	
Hope or Dope (소년비행)	18	March 25, 2022	May 31, 2022	Cho Yang-sik	Jeong Soo-yoon	Yang So-young; Hong Chae-beom; Wang Ji-min; Choi Bit-na; Kim Se-jong	
New Normal Zine (뉴노멀진)	12	June 10, 2022	July 15, 2022	CHoi Seon-mi		Jung Hye-seong; Hwang Seung-eon; Jang Eui-soo; Kim Ah-yeon; Choi Yeon-gyu	
Mimicus (미미쿠스)	16	July 22, 2022	September 14, 2022	Han Su-ji	Jang Jin; Han Su-ji; Choi Seon-guk	Im Yoo-ra; Shin Ye-seul; Choi Seong-ok; Choi Ji-eun	
Seasons of Blossom (청춘블라썸)	16	September 21, 2022	November 2, 2022	Wang Hye-ryeong	Park Yoon-seong; Kim Ha-nui	Lee So-jeon; Han Jin-soo	
Weak Hero Class 1 (약한영웅 Class 1)	TBA	November 18, 2022	TBA	Yoo Soo-min	Park Dan-hee; Yoo Soo-min	Yoo Soo-min; Kim Jin-seok	
Love Playlist series
Love Playlist (연애플레이리스트 시즌1)	10	March 9, 2017	April 1, 2017	Shin Jae-rim	Lee Seul	Lee Seul; Park Jin-ho	
Love Playlist 2 (연애플레이리스트 시즌2)	10	June 29, 2017	August 19, 2017	Shin Jae-rim	Lee Seul	Lee Seul; Park Jin-ho	
Love Playlist 3 (연애플레이리스트 시즌3)	12	September 9, 2018	October 25, 2018	Jung Eun-ha; Kim Seo-yoon	Lee Seul	Park Jin-ho	
Love Playlist 4 (연애플레이리스트 시즌4)	16	June 19, 2019	August 10, 2019	Yoo Hee-woon	Lee Seul; Choi Yo-ji; Kim Jae-hyuk	Yang So-young; Han Ah-reum	
Seventeen series
Seventeen (열일곱)	8	April 27, 2017	June 3, 2017	Park Ui-joong; Ku Se-mi	Lee Hyun-jung	Bae Sung-hoon	
Seventeen: Special Edition (열일곱 - 스페셜 에디션)	1	September 2, 2017		Park Ui-joong; Ku Se-mi	Lee Hyun-jung	Bae Sung-hoon	
Seventeen Epilogue (열일곱 에필로그)	1	July 22, 2018		Park Ui-joong; Ku Se-mi	Lee Hyun-jung	Bae Sung-hoon	
Not Alright, But It's Alright series
Not Alright, But It's Alright: Pilot (하찮아도 괜찮아 파일럿)	2	November 23, 2017	November 25, 2017	Shin Wan-seok; Baek Hae-sun	Shin Soo-ji	Park Jin-ho; Kim Tae-hyun	
Not Alright, But It's Alright (하찮아도 괜찮아 시즌1)	10	May 17, 2018	June 16, 2018	Shin Wan-seok; Baek Hae-sun	Shin Soo-ji	Park Jin-ho; Kim Tae-hyun	
Love Pub series
Love Pub: Pilot (연애포차 - 파일럿 시즌)	2	December 7, 2017	December 9, 2017	Park Ui-joong	Nam Hyo-min; Lee Ji-eun	Bae Ji-hoon	
Love Pub (연애포차)	10	March 22, 2018	April 21, 2018	Park Ui-joong	Nam Hyo-min; Lee Ji-eun	Bae Ji-hoon	
Flower Ever After series
Flower Ever After (이런 꽃 같은 엔딩)	10	January 11, 2018	February 10, 2018	Shin Wan-seok	Lee Seul	Lee Seul; Park Jin-ho	
Best Ending (최고의 엔딩)	8	May 4, 2019	May 29, 2019	Park Dan-hee	Kim Soo-min	Lee Seul; Lee Eun-seo	
Ending Again (또한번 엔딩)	12	February 2, 2020	March 15, 2020	Park Dan-hee	Jung Su-yoon	Yang So-yang; Choi Bit-na	
Ending Again Special (또한번 엔딩 - 스페셜)	1	April 11, 2020		Park Dan-hee	Jung Su-yoon	Yang So-yang; Choi Bit-na	
A-Teen series
A-Teen (에이틴)	24	July 1, 2018	September 16, 2018	Han Soo-ji	Kim Sa-ra	Song Ju-sang	Sequel to Seventeen
A-Teen 2 (에이틴2)	20	April 21, 2019	June 27, 2019	Han Soo-ji	Kim Sa-ra	Song Ju-sang; Lee Yoon-jae	
Just One Bite series
Just One Bite: Pilot (한입만 - 파일럿 시즌)	2	March 1, 2018	March 3, 2018	Baek Min-hee	Bang Yoo-jung	Lee Dong-jun	
Just One Bite (한입만)	8	July 19, 2018	August 11, 2018	Baek Min-hee	Bang Yoo-jung	Lee Dong-jun	
Just One Bite 2 (한입만 시즌2)	10	March 6, 2019	April 6, 2019	Baek Min-hee	Bang Yoo-jung	Bae Sung-hoon; Lee Dong-jun	
In-Seoul series
In-Seoul (인서울)	15	July 29, 2019	September 16, 2019	Yim Ji-eun	Jung Su-yoon	Jang Young-jun; Hong Chae-beom; Lee So-jeong	
In-Seoul 2 (인서울2)	15	June 12, 2020	July 21, 2020	Yim Ji-eun	Jung Su-yoon; Kim Hee-won	Jang Young-jun; Lee So-jeong	
Growing Season series
Growing Season (잘 하고 싶어)	12	December 10, 2020	January 15, 2021	Yoo Hee-won	Kim Hee-won	Bang Sung-hoon; Park Seo-young; Lee Eun-seo	
Growing Season Special (잘 하고 싶어 - 스페셜)	1	December 28, 2020		Yoo Hee-won	Kim Hee-won	Bang Sung-hoon; Park Seo-young; Lee Eun-seo	
Growing Season Special 2 (잘 하고 싶어 X 사조대림 특별편)	1	March 18, 2021		Yoo Hee-won	Kim Hee-won	Bang Sung-hoon; Park Seo-young; Lee Eun-seo	
Side story
Re:Playlist (리플레이리스트)	3	June 17, 2018	August 20, 2018	—N/a			From: Seventeen; Not Alright, But It's Alright; Just One Bite
Re-Feel (리필 (RE-FEEL))	8	January 10, 2019	February 2, 2019	Kim Do-young	Choi Yoji	Bae Sung-hoon; Kim Ban-ya; Bae Ji-hoon	From: Love Playlist; A-Teen; WHY; 4 Reasons I hate Christmas
Pu Reum's Vlog (연플리 시즌 3.5)	2	March 1, 2019	March 5, 2019				Also known as Love Playlist 3.5; From: Love Playlist 3
4 Reasons I hate Christmas (크리스마스가 싫은 네 가지 이유)	6	December 7, 2019	December 25, 2019	Yoo Hee-un	Bang Yoo-jung; Jaysun	Jang Young-jun; Lee Dong-jun; Lee Eun-seo	From: Love Playlist 4; Re-Feel; In-Seoul
Plans (플랜즈)	1	July 10, 2021					From: Flower Ever After; Love Playlist 4
Spin-off
Re-Feel: If Only (리필 - If Only)	6	June 30, 2021	August 4, 2021				From Re-Feel
Dear. M (디어엠)	12	TBA		Park Jin-woo; Seo Joo-wan	Lee Seul	Park Tae-won; Jung Hae-ryong	From Love Playlist 4

=== Love Playlist ===
The first series produced by Playlist Studio is Love Playlist (Korean: 연애 플레이리스트), which premiered on March 9, 2017, and lasted for four seasons, until its final broadcast, on August 10, 2019. In each episode it depicts the experiences and thoughts of people in their 20s related to love and deals with the process of falling in love with a person, starting a relationship, ending unrequited love, and a couple breaking up because of a misunderstanding. The cast features Kim Hyung-seok as Lee Hyun-seung, Jung Shin-hye as Jung Ji-won, Lee Yoo-jin as Han Jae-in, Choi Hee-seung as Kim Min-woo, Lim Hwi-jin as Kwak Jun-mo, Park Jung-woo as Kang Yoon, Min Hyo-won as Kim Do-yeong, Bae Hyun-sung as Park Ha-neul and Kim Sae-ron as Seo Ji-min who joined the line up in season 4. In season 4, it depicts various stories of characters who went on to adapt not only to love, but also friendship, military enlistment, and awkward social adjustment after being discharged from the military were unfolded. The drama also features original soundtrack (OST) by Brother Su and Cosmic Girls' Yoo Yeon-jung, Paul Kim, Kim Na-young, 10cm, MeloMance's Kim Min-seok, Exo-CBX, and Suran. For season 1 and 2, Facebook was the main platform, and YouTube was the main platform in season 3 and 4.

Pu Reum's Vlog (Korean: 연플리 시즌 3.5, also known as Love Playlist Season 3.5) was a surprise release on March 1, 2019, with a preview of the upcoming season 4.

The drama became massively popular in South Korea and internationally leading this to the 'Yeon-Fly-Lee' syndrome. They later held a fan meeting at the White Wave Art Center in Seoul on August 18, 2017, with more than 300 fans attending. The event drew attraction with more than 17,000 people participating in the invitation event. Love Playlist ended with total views for the four seasons exceeded 650 million views. As of July 2021, the series exceeded 700 million views.

Dear. M is a spin-off of Love Playlist. It tells the stories of students at Seoyeon University trying to find 'M', the anonymous writer of the school community article that turned the school upside down. Originally planned for a February 2021 broadcast, it has since been postponed due to the controversy involving its lead actress Park Hye-su.

=== Seventeen ===
Following the success of Love Playlist, Seventeen depicts an unforgettable first love centre on a group of close-knit friends love between a college student and a young man.

=== Yellow ===
Titled Yellow, the drama starred deals with the love of anxious youth in an indie band and their charismatic tag-along photographer. The drama premiered on September 12 – October 12, 2017. The drama starred Kim Do-wan (Nam Ji-hoon, the leader), Kim Kwan-soo (Song Tae-min, the guitarist), Kim Hae-woo (Ja Pi, the drummer), Lee Se-jin (Park Dong-woo, the bassist), Ji Ye-eun (Cho Soo-a, the photographer) and Kim Ye-ji (Lee Yeo-reum). The drama features OST from Mamamoo's Wheein, Melomance, and Car, the Garden Yellow received a total of 28 million views in Korea alone, and an average of 4.66 million views per episode. Later, it reached a total of 43 million views in November 2017.

=== Flower Ever After ===
Flower Ever After is a romance drama about a marriage in the 20s and 30s. It starred five people with different charms; Lee Ho-jung as Han So-young, a newcomer loved by everyone for her natural sense, Choi Hee-jin as Ko Go-chae, a cute job seeker who has been in a long-term relationship for 7 years, Jung Geon-joo as Choi Woong, who is a beast but warm only in front of his woman, Ahn Si-eun, who plays the good Gong Ji-hyo, and Kang Hoon, who plays Yoo Hyeon-soo, a gentleman who dreams of marrying the woman he loves. The series recorded 800,000 views, the highest number of views in the shortest time.

=== A-Teen ===
A-Teen is a web drama that gained explosive popularity among teenagers aged 13 to 19 which aired for the first time in July 2018. It has been said that it captured the concerns of teenagers, including dating and unrequited love. The drama recorded the highest number of views of 4.38 million on YouTube. As of December 2019, the series garnered a total cumulative number of 480 million views.

=== Just One Bite ===
Just One Bite released on July 19, 2018, and ended on April 6, 2019, is starred by Kim Ji-in, Seo Hye-won, Jo Hye-joo, Park Seo-ham, Lee Shin-young, Park Seon-jae, Han Kyu-won and Lee Seong-ha. The drama shows three women who laugh and chat while looking for restaurants. It drew the sympathy of many people by depicting realistic mukbang and friendship and love of women in their 20s.

=== In Seoul ===
In Seoul tells a realistic story of two mothers and daughters who clash from room cleaning to college.

=== XX ===
As of the beginning of 2021, the cumulative number of viewers of XX reached about 100 million.

=== Twenty-Twenty ===
Twenty-Twenty is a drama by director Han Su-ji, who directed the web drama A-Teen. This is Han Seong-min's first lead role, who has been working as a magazine model, and the female lead, Chae Da-hee, who he plays, is a character who has lived as her mother has set her up. Kim Woo-seok, a member of the idol group UP10TION, takes on the role of Lee Hyun-jin, a male lead who creates a music crew and pursues his dreams independently without the help of his parents.

=== Plans ===
Plans also known as Plans: Seoyeon University x Revan is a side story of Love Playlist and Flower Ever After. Released on July 10, 2021, on the Playlist's official YouTube channel, the video revolved Love Playlist after two years. Starring Lee Yoo-jin (Jae In), an intern at Revan Company meets Kim Hyung-seok (Hyun Seung) and Choi Hee-seung (Min Woo) after a long time at Seoyeon University for a job interview with her senior Kang Hoon (Hyun Soo). As the main web drama protagonists of the playlist gathered in one place, the number of views of the video reached 790,000 within four days of its release.

=== Blue Birthday ===
Directed by Park Dan-hee and written by Goo So-yeon and Moon Won-young, Blue Birthday it is a work that challenged new genres and materials by reuniting with the production team, who had gathered topics with ending series such as The Best Ending (2019) and Ending Again (2020). The drama starred Kim Ye-rim of Red Velvet and Hongseok of Pentagon, tells a fantasy romance thriller drama in which the female protagonists revisit the past through mysterious photos left by her first love, who died on her birthday 10 years ago. The drama consists of three songs, including remakes of two popular Korean songs that were released in 2011, Beast's "On Rainy Days" (re-recorded and sung by Heize) and Lucia with Epitone Project's "Any Day, Any Words" (re-recorded and sung by O3ohn). The third and original song of the drama, "It's You" is recorded by Colde

=== Peng ===
The drama depicts the romance of a woman entering her 30s in which four different men appear in the life of the main protagonist, Go Sa-ri (Yoon So-hee). Go Sa-ri who is trying to start fresh as she says goodbye to her 20s faces a difficult situation when her ex-boyfriend Jeon Woo-sang (Lee Seung-il), a younger guy Yeon Ha-rim (Kim Hyun-jin), her best friend Pi Jung-won (Choi Won-myung), and her boss Ki Sun-jae (Joo Woo-jae) simultaneously try to win her over. Peng premieres on October 7, 2021, through YouTube and Watcha.

=== A DeadbEAT's Meal ===
The story of Jae Ho's growth in healing a series of job failures and parting pains with food. It is based on the popular webtoon of the same name. Ha Seok-jin takes on the role of Kim Jae-ho, an involuntary man who is preparing for a job for the second year after graduating from the Department of Korean Literature, after five years of public examination. Go Won-hee takes on the role of Yeo Eun-ho, a hot-tempered voluntary white man who claims that eating is all that is left in today's low-interest rates. Im Hyun-joo as the role of Seo Soo-jeong, an employee of a large telecommunication company in her second year of social life.

=== Weak Hero Class 1 ===
The drama is based on Naver webtoon Weak Hero by writer Seopass and illustrated by Kim Jin-seok (Razen), which was published in 2018. It stars Park Ji-hoon, Choi Hyun-wook, and Hong Kyung, directed and written by Yoo Soo-min and Han Jun-hee as the creative director. The series revolves around a weak-looking boy, who fights against numerous violence with his friends. Three episodes out of eight were screened at 27th Busan International Film Festival in 'On Screen' section. It aired exclusively as Wavve Original on November 18, 2022. The series was met with praise by critics and audiences for its production and solid actors' performances.

== Frequent collaborators ==
This table lists actors who appear as different characters in more than one television series.

Actors	Television series																									
Actors	Love Playlist (2016-19)	Seventeen (2017)	Yellow (2017)	Hello Stranger (2017)	Flower Ever After (2018)	Love Pub (2018)	NABIA (Note: Not Alright, But It's Alright) (2018)	Re:Playlist (2018)	A-Teen (2018)	Just One Bite (2018)	WHY (2018)	The Best Ending (2019)	Ending Again (2020)	Pop Out Boy! (2020)	Twenty-Twenty (2020)	Let Me Off the Earth (2020)	My Fuxxxxx Romance (2020)	Live On (2020)	Re-Feel: If Only (2021)	Peng (2021)	Hope or Dope (2022)	Dear. M (2022)	Mimicus (2022)	Seasons of Blossom (2022)	New Love Playlist (2022)	Weak Hero Class 1 (2022)
Jung Hun-hwan	✔												✔								✔					
Kim Su-hyun	✔								✔						✔								✔			
Kim Do-wan		✔	✔					✔																		
Han Se-jin			✔			✔															✔					
Song Geon-hee				✔			✔	✔																		
Jeong Ha-yul							✔			✔																
Jung Gun-joo					✔				✔		✔	✔	✔													
Oh Dong-min						✔	✔										✔									
Choi Won-myung									✔											✔						
Baek Soo-hee									✔											✔						
Choi Kyung-hoon												✔							✔							
Choi Hyun-wook														✔												✔
Kim Min-kyu														✔										✔		
Lee Seung-il															✔					✔						
Jong Ji-woo																✔					✔		✔			
Jeon Woong																✔							✔			
Han Kyu-min																✔								✔		
Woo Da-vi																		✔				✔				
Jo Joon-young																		✔				✔				
Lee Jae-hak																					✔					✔
Do Yoo-jae																					✔			✔		
Oh Yu-jin																								✔	✔	
Yoon Hyun-soo																								✔	✔	

== Recurring cast and characters ==
This table lists the characters who will appear or have appeared in more than one television series in Playlist Universe.

M = Main role S = Supporting role G = Guest role

Characters	Portrayed by	Television series																										
Characters	Portrayed by	Love Playlist (2016–19)				Seventeen (2017–18)		Flower Ever After (2018)	NABIA (2018)	Re:Playlist (2018)	A-Teen (2018–19)		Just One Bite (2018)	Go Back Diary (2018)	Want More 19 (2018)	W.H.Y (Note: WHY: What Happened to Your Relationship) (2018)	Re-feel (2019)		The Best Ending (2019)	In-Seoul (2019–20)	The Guilty Secret (2019)	4RWIHX (Note: 4 Reasons Why I Hate X-mas) (2019)	Ending Again (2020)	Twenty Twenty (2020)	Plans (2021)	Blue Birthday (2021)	Dear. M (2022)	New Love Playlist (2022)
Characters	Portrayed by	1	2	3	4	1	2 (Note: Seventeen Epilogue (2018))	Flower Ever After (2018)	NABIA (2018)	Re:Playlist (2018)	1	2	Just One Bite (2018)	Go Back Diary (2018)	Want More 19 (2018)	W.H.Y (2018)	1	2 (Note: Re-feel: If Only (2021))	The Best Ending (2019)	In-Seoul (2019–20)	The Guilty Secret (2019)	4RWIHX (2019)	Ending Again (2020)	Twenty Twenty (2020)	Plans (2021)	Blue Birthday (2021)	Dear. M (2022)	New Love Playlist (2022)
Lee Hyun-seung	Kim Hyung-seok	M	M	M	M			G (Note: In Flower Ever Ends episode 1 "Love Like Flower".)									G (Note: In Re-Feel episode 2 "When You Regret Turning Someone Down".)		G (Note: In The Best Ending episode 1 "I Met My Boyfriend at 'That Place'".)						M			G
Jung Ji-won	Jung Shin-hye	M	M	M	M			G									G		G			G (Note: In 4 Reasons Why I Hate X-mas episode 4 "Characteristics Of Those Who Date Collegues From Part-time Jobs".)						
Han Jae-in	Lee Yoo-jin	M	M	M	M												G		G (Note: In The Best Ending episode 6 "My Girlfriend Told Everyone About My Past".)						M			G
Kim Min-woo	Choi Hee-seung	M	M	M	G			G (Note: In Flower Ever Ends episode 3 "The Reason Is External".)	G (Note: In Not Alright, But It's Alright episode 3 "A Delightful But Short Payday".)							G (Note: In WHY episode 2 "When You Feel Miserable In a Relationship".)	G								M			G
Kwak Jun-mo	Lim Hwi-win	M	M	M	G			G								G												G
Kang Yoon	Park Jung-woo	S	M	G	M																							
Kim Do-young	Min Hyo-won		M	G													G					G						G
Choi Seung-hyuk	Kim Woo-seok		S	M																								
Jung Pu-reum	Park Shi-an			S	M												G (Note: In Re-feel episode 3 "The Reason Two Guys Are Fighting Over Me".)					M						G
Park Ha-neul	Bae Hyun-sung			S	M																						M	
Kim Ba-da	Jung Hee-young				G												S					M						
Kim Se-ri	Yoo Hye-in					M	M		M																			
Yoo Hyun-soo	Kang Hoon							M	G (Note: In Not Alright, But It's Alright episode 7 "It's Alright Not to Have Time".) (Note: In Not Alright, But It's Alright episode 10 "Not All Right, But It's Alright".)																M			
Choi Woong	Jung Gun-joo							M			G (Note: As Mr. Choi, a P.E. teacher in A-Teen S1 episode 6 "Reason Why It's Scary When a Quiet One Gets Upset".)								M				G (Note: In Ending Again episode 1 "I Slept With A Guy From School".)					
Go Min-chae	Choi Hee-jin							M											M				G (Note: In Ending Again episode 3 "Who Gets Scammed Like This These Days?".)					
Gong Ji-hyo	Ahn Si-eun							M											G (Note: In The Best Ending episode 8 "Which Ending Will Await the Couple That Got Back Together?".)									
Oh Ji-hye	Park Se-hyun				G (Note: In Love Playlist 4 episode 12 "How a College Student Decides to Drop Out".)														S									
Go Min-chang	Kim Min-jong																		S				S					
Kwon Ki-woo	Song Geon-hee								M	M																		
Lee Chan-hyeok	Lee Shin-young									M			M															
Im Soo-ji	Seo Hye-won									M				M			G (Note: In Re-feel episode 4 "How To Give A Gift That Will Definitely Remind Someone Of Me".)											
Do Ha-na	Shin Ye-eun						G (Note: In Seventeen Epilogue episode 1 "The Reason Why You Can't Be Friends with Your Ex".)				M	M																
Kim Ha-na	Lee Na-eun										M	M									G (Note: In The Guilty Secret episode 1 "A Friend that Knows My Secret Transferred to My School".)			G (Note: In Twenty-Twenty episode 1 "I Decided to Cross The Line That I Could Never Cross".)				
Ha Min	Kim Dong-hee						G				M	M																
Cha Gi-hyun	Ryu Ui-hyun										M	M					G (Note: In Re-feel episode 1 "My First Love Came As The New Part-timer".)							G				
Ryu Joo-ha	Choi Bo-min										M	M									G			G				
Yeo Bo-ram	Kim Su-hyun				G						M	M		G			G							G				
Lee Gyeom	Nam Yoon-su														M		G											
Lee Han-na	Lee Ji-won															M	G (Note: In Re-feel episode 5 "How To Tell If Someone Has A Crush On You".)											
Oh Seul-gi	Yoo Dong-guk															M	G											
Han Chae-hee	Lee Chan-hyung				G (Note: In Love Playlist 4 episode 16 "A Perfect Example of a Straightforward Love Confession".)							G (Note: In A-Teen 2 episode 11 "I Pretended to Be a Couple With Someone I Like".)					M	M										
Park Jin-ho	Jeon Hye-yeon											G					M	M				S						
Lee Soo-yun	Lee Seo-bin																S					G						
Kang Da-mi	Min Do-hee																			M		M						
Lee Ha-rim	Jin Ye-ju																			M		M						
Ji Seo-jun	Yang Hong-seok																							G		M		

=== Notable guests ===
- Paul Kim
- Na Jae-min (NCT Dream)
- Lee Je-no (NCT Dream)
- Ahn Ji-young (Bolbbalgan4)
- JeA (Brown Eyed Girls)
- Hyun Woo-jin
- Joshua (Seventeen)
- Kim Min-ju (Iz*One)
- Hyunjin (Stray Kids)
- I.N (Stray Kids)
- Lee Han-wi
- Ahn Se-ha
- Kim Hye-yoon
- Go Woo-ri
- Jung Soo-young
- Cha Yeob
- Jeon No-min
- Yoon Yoo-sun
- Kim Jung-hak
- Song Seon-mi
- Kenta (JBJ95)
- Lena
- Yeonjun (Tomorrow X Together)
- Young K (Day6)
- Wonpil (Day6)
- Jaejae
- May (Cherry Bullet)
- Remi (Cherry Bullet)
- Haeyoon (Cherry Bullet)
- Wooyeon (Woo!ah!)
- Park Sung-hoon (Enhypen)
- Kim Woo-seok (Up10tion)
