= Playlist Studio =

South Korean production company

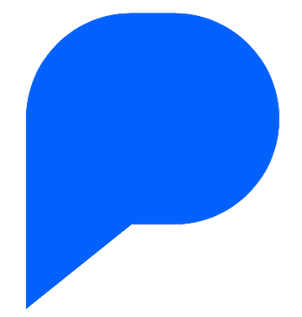

- Type: Private
- Industry: Entertainment; Broadcasting (drama production); Music
- Genre: Korean drama; Teen drama; Coming-of-age; Entertainment
- Founded: May 23, 2017; 9 years ago
- Founder: Park Tae-won
- Headquarters: 415, Teheran-ro Gangnam-gu, Seoul, South Korea
- Key people: Park Tae-won, CEO Baek Kwang-hyeon, COO Yoon Hyun-gi, PD
- Products: Web series; Merchandise
- Number of employees: 100 (2020)
- Parent: Naver Corporation
- Website: playliststudio.kr

Playlist Studio (Korean: 플레이리스트 스튜디오; RR: Peulleiriseuteu Seutyudio), better known as Playlist, is a South Korean web drama production company known for producing independent video content and can expand its business to various areas such as performances, webtoons, music sources, and games by using intellectual property rights (IP). It is also known for its several hit web dramas including Love Playlist, Seventeen, A-Teen, and Weak Hero Class 1. The production mainly focuses on the 10s and 20s aged audience and a time limit running time within 10 minutes (or a maximum of 20 minutes).

As of June 2021, Sports Seoul reported that the Playlist Original has over 2.6 million subscribers and has the number of subscribers to all Playlist channels (Playlist Indonesia, Playlist Japan and Playlist Vietnam) exceeded 14.6 million.

== Logo ==
The second Playlist Studio's logo was introduced in August 2020 to lead a fun and playful pop culture by creating content that empathizes and move people and the world.

== History ==
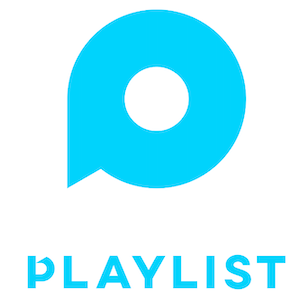
First logo, used from 2018 to 2019

In January 2017, Playlist was established for Snow app promotion by a joint investment from Snow Corp. and Line Webtoon, which are subsidiaries of Naver Corporation and is led by CEO Park Tae-won who has worked for Google Korea and Google Japan. In May of the same year, it decided to separate and build a new company after seeing their first web drama Love Playlist gained huge popularity after word of mouth among college students after it first aired in March 2017. The drama went on for four seasons and ended with total views for the four seasons exceeded 630 million views.

Playlist Global (stylized as PlayList Global) is a global service platform promoting through Facebook, Naver TV and YouTube providing subtitle services in 10 countries, including English, Japanese, French, Chinese, and Indonesian. The production company introduces it as a 'mobile broadcasting station' in the official Facebook account, saying, "I believe that TV will move to mobile, just as PC has moved to mobile."

In December 2018, Playlist positioning itself as a music video content producer as it established a music channel, Mu:Ply (stylized in all caps).

In September 2019, Playlist acquired a 3.63% (172 shares) stake in Sublime Artist Agency for 301 million won on the 20th. The acquisition amount is equivalent to 41.44% of the company's equity capital as of the end of 2018.

In October 2019, Playlist had attracted an investment of 5.3 billion won from a Silicon Valley–based venture capital (VC), Altos Ventures.

In February 2020, former Studio Dragon chief producer (CP) Yoon Hyun-gi joined Playlist Studio as head PD for its drama division.

In May 2020, Playlist signed a memorandum of understanding (MOU) with LG U+, a South Korean telecommunication company to jointly produce and distribute short-form 5G contents such as web dramas for VR, AR music videos, and 3D PPL by combining LG U+ VR and AR technology with the contents produced by Playlist.

In August 2020, Playlist underwent its first rebrand and renewed its CI and BI in three years, introducing a new logo, the brand slogan 'Play your story' and brand core values 'Empathy', 'Pleasure', 'Leading' and 'Growth' and business areas such as drama, music, commerce, such as Playlist original, Teenply, Mu:Ply, Playlist developed playlist store and Playlist style to reflect the brand system.

== Content creators ==
Playlist started with a small number of 2 writers, 2-3 directors, and a designer. In 2019, Playlist has about 90 young creators with more than half of the total is people in their 20s, and 70% of them are content creators such as writers, directors, producers, and designers. According to CEO Park, "Writers are discovered through contests. Neither writers nor directors are selected based on their past experiences because people in their twenties themselves are not yet inexperienced." He also emphasized that the content development project are done through the collective intelligence of the majority that decision-making and judgment of a few.

== Growth ==
=== User statistics ===
In 2018, Playlist's subscribers surpassed 3.19 million on Facebook and 950,000 on YouTube. The release of Love Playlist 1 & 2, it garnered over 300 million views and 70% of the main traffic is female from both the domestic and international channel. As the show progresses, it surpassed 1 million views each time the episode was uploaded on YouTube.

By April 2019, Playlist had over 1.3 billion global views and 7.7 million subscribers worldwide. It sold 45,000 items such as beauty products, stationery and miscellaneous goods in five weeks and 10,000 exports in two weeks. With the release of A-Teen 2 first on Naver TV before other platforms such as YouTube, the platform is also effective in securing platform users. Before the pre-release of the drama, Playlist videos' average number of views was around 20,000 to 30,000 on the platform. Later, the views exceeded 2 million when it was released.

By December 2019, Playlist recorded 2 billion cumulative views domestically and abroad, such as Japan, Taiwan, and Vietnam. The average number of views per episode is about 2-5 million.

In June 2021, XX, Ending Again, In Seoul 2, Pop out boy!, Twenty-Twenty, Live On, My Fuxxxxx Romance, and Growing Season received the highest proportion of viewers aged between 18 and 24. The proportion of viewers aged 18–24 for the eight works averaged about 43%. However, XX, My Fuxxxxx Romance, and Growing Season have the second-highest proportion of viewers aged 25–34 (21%, 27%, and 16%, respectively), covering a wide audience from teens to 30s. In addition, My fuxxxxx Romance broke the prejudice that male viewers accounted for 56% of the total, and that dramas were exclusively for female viewers.

According to data collected in June 2021, Playlist dramas are watched through smartphones (80%), PCs (11%), tablets (6.6%), TVs (1.01%), and game consoles (0.1%). Playlist has achieved 3.1 billion global views and 14 million subscribers worldwide in four years since its launch.

=== Contents release through V Live ===
In 2019, Naver's video platform V Live opened its membership platform in April for A-Teen 2. It is the first drama to open a channel other than artists such as idol singers and actors. The drama video was released one week ahead of other platforms with no ads, 3 special live videos of A-Teen 2, text and photo content, and members-only bulletin boards are also provided. Other drama release through V Live are Love Playlist 4, Just One Bite 2, and In Seoul 1 and 2.

=== Reception ===
Due to the domestic and international success of Yellow (2017), the drama held a 2-hour fan meeting on November 4, 2017, at the White Wave Art Center in Seoul with a performance by Car, the Garden and MeloMance. A-Teen's (2018-2019) popularity has resulted in the webtoons and script books being created. The lipstick collaboration with A-Teen became popular, selling 60,000 in Korea and Japan. In addition, the character Do Ha-na led to an explosive response from viewers. Through CEO Park words: During the character planning and development, Do Ha-na is focused on a character that does what teenagers want to do. Through interviews with teenagers, I studied how they felt in what situations and how they felt and reflected that into the main character's personality. The actor who played the character Shin Ye-eun, swept advertisements for 10 brands, and is emerging as a new 'Advertising Queen'. In addition, Kim Dong-hee (played as Ha Min) was cast in JTBC's high-rated drama SKY Castle and is continuing his acting career.

== Plyverse ==
Plyverse (Korean: 플리버스) is a portmanteau of the words Playlist and Universe a non-narrative name given to the fictional setting of the television series produced by Playlist Studio. The term is used to link characters seen across secondary contents, such as collaborations and spin-offs, by organically connecting and integrating each work based on a common worldview.

== Original programming ==
=== Movie ===
Title	Genre	Director(s)	Screenwriter(s)	Producer(s)	Premiere	Runtime	Note
Broject	Teen/crime drama	Joo Sung-min	Shin Soo-ji	Kim Tae-hyun	December 29, 2018	12–14 mins	Split into 2 parts
Love Buzz	Mystery fantasy teen romance	Kim Ha-jin, Baek Hae-sun	Carrot	Kim Jun-mo, Jang Hyun-ho	April 27, 2019	28 mins, 20 secs	

=== Drama ===
Title	Genre	Premiere	Finale	Seasons	Runtime	Note
Love Playlist	Youth romance	March 9, 2017	August 14, 2019	4 seasons, 48 episodes	5–27 mins	7 special episodes
Seventeen	Teen drama romance	April 27, 2017	June 3, 2017	1 season, 8 episodes	4-7 mins	2 special episodes
Yellow	Music teen drama	September 12, 2017	October 12, 2017	1 season, 10 episodes	7-10 mins	
Hello Stranger	Romance drama	December 21, 2017	December 23, 2017	1 season, 2 episodes	17-18 mins	Pilot series
Flower Ever After	Drama	January 11, 2018	February 10, 2018	1 season, 10 episodes	13-19 mins	
Luv Pub	Romantic comedy drama	March 22, 2018	April 21, 2018	1 season, 10 episodes	7-13 mins	2 pilot episodes
Not Alright, But It's Alright	Coming-of-age drama	May 17, 2018	June 16, 2018	1 season, 10 episodes	7-13 mins	2 pilot episodes
Re:Playlist	Anthology series music teen drama	June 17, 2018	August 20, 2018	1 season, 3 episodes	4-5 mins	Side story
A-Teen	Coming-of-age romance	July 1, 2018	September 16, 2018	2 season, 10 episodes	9–16 mins	A-Teen 2 premiered on April 25, 2019
Just One Bite	Culinary arts sitcom	July 19, 2018	April 6, 2019	2 season, 18 episodes	9–15 mins	2 pilot episodes aired March 1–3, 2018; Just One Bite 2 premiered on March 6, 2019
Go, Back Diary	Youth romance	August 30, 2018	September 8, 2018	1 season, 4 episodes	8–10 mins	Pilot series
Want More 19	Romance	October 24, 2018	November 14, 2018	1 season, 7 episodes	6–9 mins	
WHY: What Happened to Your Relationship	Romantic comedy	November 10, 2018	December 13, 2018	1 season, 10 episodes	9–19 mins	
Re-Feel	Coming-of-age romance	January 10, 2019	February 2, 2019	2 season, 14 episodes	8–14 mins	Side story Re-Feel: If Only premiered on June 30, 2021.
The Best Ending	Romance drama	May 4, 2019	May 29, 2019	1 season, 8 episodes	6–18 mins	Flower Ever After sequel Aired on MBC TV
In Seoul	Coming-of-age Family drama teen drama	July 29, 2019	July 21, 2020	2 season, 30 episodes	5–39 mins	Aired on JTBC; In Seoul 2 aired on June 12, 2020
The Guilty Secret	Coming-of-age drama	September 8, 2019	October 17, 2019	1 season, 12 episodes	8–17 mins	
Dear My Name	Fantasy romance drama	November 2, 2019	November 20, 2019	1 season, 6 episodes	9–12 mins	
4 Reasons Why I Hate X-mas	Romance drama	December 7, 2019	December 25, 2019	1 season, 6 episodes	16–17 mins	Side story
XX	Drama	January 24, 2020	February 21, 2020	1 season, 10 episodes	21–30 mins	Co-produced by MBC, aired on MBC TV as 5 episodes
Ending Again	Romance	February 8, 2020	March 15, 2020	1 season, 12 episodes	14–22 mins	The Best Ending sequel Aired on MBC dramanet and SeriesON; Special episode premiered on April 11, 2020
Pop out boy!	Romantic comedy	June 24, 2020	July 23, 2020	1 season, 10 episodes		Based on webtoon. Aired on MBC Drama and SeriesON
Twenty-Twenty	Music teen drama	August 15, 2020	October 21, 2020	1 season, 20 episodes		Aired on JTBC
Let Me Off the Earth	Fantasy comedy-drama	September 11, 2020	August 6, 2021	3 season, 45 episodes	7–18 mins	Aired on Teenply YouTube channel
My Fuxxxxx Romance	Drama	October 15, 2020	November 1, 2020	1 season, 6 episodes	11–18 mins	Content rating aged 15 or older
Live On	Coming-of-age teen drama	November 17, 2020	January 12, 2021	1 season, 8 episodes		Co-produced by JTBC Studios and KeyEast Entertainment; Aired on JTBC
Growing Season	Coming-of-age romance drama	December 10, 2020	January 22, 2021	1 season, 12 episodes	17–25 mins	2 special episodes premiered on December 28, 2020 and March 18, 2021
Ply Friends: Seoyeon X Revan	Drama	July 10, 2021	July 10, 2021	1 episodes	12 mins	Aired on Playlist Studio's YouTube channel
Blue Birthday	Fantasy romance thriller	July 23, 2021	September 11, 2021	1 season, 16 episodes	20 mins	A movie format is released on CGV, premiere on January 19, 2022.
Peng	Romance drama	October 7, 2021	November 5, 2021	1 season, 10 episodes	20 mins	Aired on Watcha and Playlist Studio's YouTube channel
Ply Friends: Seoyeon Carrot Market	Drama	October 18, 2021	October 18, 2021	1 episodes	12 mins	Aired on Playlist Studio's YouTube channel
A DeadbEAT's Meal	Romance drama	December 10, 2021	January 14, 2022	1 season, 12 episodes	25 mins	Based on webtoon. Co-produced by Studio N. Aired on TVING, Naver TV, and Playlist Studio's YouTube channel
Ply Friends: Seoyeon University Class of '22	Romance drama	March 4, 2022	March 18, 2022	1 season, 3 episodes	12 mins	Aired on Playlist Studio's YouTube channel
Hope or Dope	Teen noir	March 25, 2022	May 31, 2022	2 season, 18 episodes		Co-produced by KT Seezn. Seezn Original.
New Normal Zine	Drama	June 10, 2022	July 15, 2022	1 season, 12 episodes	20 mins	Aired on TVING
Dear. M	Coming-of-age romance drama	June 29, 2022 (Note: Originally planned for a February 2021 broadcast, it has since been postponed due to the controversy involving its lead actress Park Hye-su.)	July 6, 2022	1 season, 12 episodes	60-63 mins	Love Playlist spin-off Co-produced by Monster Union, to air on KBS 2TV
Mimicus	Coming-of-age romance	July 22, 2022	September 14, 2022	1 season, 16 episodes		
Seasons of Blossom	Coming-of-age Romance drama	September 21, 2022	November 2, 2022	1 season, 16 episodes		Based on webtoon. Co-produced by Jaedam Media and Copus Korea. Wavve Original
New Love Playlist	Romance drama	November 16, 2022	December 28, 2022	1 season, 12 episodes		
Weak Hero Class 1	Coming-of-age action drama	November 18, 2022		1 season, 8 episodes	35-47 mins	Based on webtoon. Wavve Original
While You Were Drunk	Romantic comedy	2022	TBA	TBA	TBA	
World Cup Baby	Fantasy romance	2022	TBA	TBA	TBA	
Unfollow	Drama	2022	TBA	TBA	TBA	
Secret Playlist	Romance music	2022	TBA	TBA	TBA	Based on webtoon
Back to You	Fantasy romance	2022	TBA	TBA	TBA	Based on webtoon
The Deal	Crime thriller mystery	October 5, 2023	October 27, 2023	1 season, 8 episodes	40 mins	Based on webtoon
Sseomnameseo Gesnamkkaji	Romance drama	2022	TBA	1 season, 10 episodes	TBA	Based on web novel. Omnibus format
Secret Relationships	BL romance drama	February 27, 2025	March 21, 2025	1 season, 8 episodes	TBA	Based on webtoon. Co-produced by Fuji TV and Kakao Entertainment

=== Entertainment ===
Title	Genre	Premiere	Finale	Seasons	Runtime	Note
Coverlist	Music, dance	December 28, 2018	March 27, 2020	3 season, 67 episodes	4 mins	
MU:PLY Special	Music, dance	September 6, 2019	September 17, 2020	1 season, 8 episodes	3-4 mins	High-quality Kpop music video
Knock Knock Knock	Music, dance	October 14, 2019	October 30, 2020	1 season, 45 episodes	2-8 mins	Performed three songs when there are three times of 'knock'
All That Mic	Talk and live music	November 16, 2019	August 2, 2020	1 season, 16 episodes	15-24 mins	Jamie's High-Quality Music Live Entertainment to sing regardless of location.
B Side 1	Entertainment	December 17, 2019	January 3, 2020	1 season, 4 episodes	8-15 mins	The story of Stray Kids making their own colours.
Sunmi's RReal World	Reality	June 3, 2020	July 22, 2020	3 season, 8 episodes	10–22 mins	Sunmi exploring with her brothers
The Silence Of IDOL	Performance variety show	December 11, 2020	TBA		10–15 mins	Complete the mission and dance without sound
Random Q	Talk show	December 4, 2020	October 28, 2021	1 season, 9 episodes	10–15 mins	Artists' minor TMI's, current dilemmas, recent interest to promotion behinds
B Side 2	Entertainment	December 16, 2021	December 30, 2021	1 season, 3 episodes	15-17 mins	Fake entertainment show describing Loona's fun journey to their comeback.
#OUTNOW Unlimited	Talk and live music	August 6, 2021	September 14, 2021	1 season, 2 episodes	40-42 mins	A live stream comeback show on Naver Now. hosted by Na In-woo where Sunmi and Lisa appeared on the show to promote their album release.
Muzie-kwang Company	Reality	September 23, 2021	November 25, 2021	1 season, 10 episodes	20-30 mins	A fake reality show of MuzieKwang Company, an entertainment company founded by producer Muzie and their first artist Lee Gi-kwang to become the leading player in global Kpop.
#OUTNOW	Talk and live music	October 29, 2021	TBA			A comeback show where musicians, actors, and directors appear as hosts to promote their content.

== Music ==
=== Soundtracks ===
Title	Album details
Blue Birthday OST	Released: September 10, 2019; Label: Playlist, Genie, Stone; Formats: CD, digital download; Track listing (Note: The album includes around 10 tracks including the main tracks, instrumentals, and score.): 1. "On Rainy Days (2021 ver)" (Heize); 2. "Any Day, Any Words (2021 ver)" (O3ohn); 3. "It's You" (Colde); 4. "It's You (Yeri of Red Velvet Ver.)" (Yeri (Red Velvet))
Ply Friends: Seoyeon University Class of '22 OST	Released: June 3, 2022; Label: Playlist, Genie, Stone; Formats: Digital download; Track listing: 1. "Good Person (2022)" (Haechan of NCT)
Mimicus OST	Released: September 10, 2022; Label: Playlist, Genie, Stone; Formats: CD, digital download; Track listing (Note: The album includes around 9 tracks including the main tracks, instrumentals, and score.): 1. "I Need the Light" (Enhypen); 2. "Hugs" (Sumin); 3. "Let's Get Together" (Ateez)
Seasons of Blossoms OST	Released: October 5, 2022; Label: Playlist, Genie, Stone; Formats: CD, digital download; Track listing (Note: The album includes around 8 tracks including the main tracks, instrumentals, and score.): 1. "In Time" (O3ohn); 2. "Seasons of Blossom" (Cheon Ji-won)
Weak Hero Class 1 OST	Released: November 22, 2022; Label: Playlist, Genie, Stone; Formats: CD, digital download; Track listing (Note: The album includes around 10 tracks including the main tracks, instrumentals, and score.): 1. "Hero (Prod. by Primary)" (Meego); 2. "Brass Knuckle" (Boi. B); 3. "Homesick (Prod. by Primary)" (Benzamin); 4. "Self" (Meego); 5. "Again" (Han); 6. "Hero (Prod. by Primary)" (Inst.); 7. "Brass Knuckle" (Inst.); 8. "Homesick" (Inst.); 9. "Self" (Inst.); 10. "Again" (Inst.)

== Others ==
=== Merchandise ===
Title	Product Name	Released
A-Teen	A-teen x Peripera	May 1, 2019
A-Teen	A-teen x Motemote	November 19, 2020
Twenty - Twenty	Twenty - Twenty Kit	November 19, 2020
Twenty - Twenty	Twenty - Twenty photo magazine	November 25, 2020
Live On	Motemote x Live On collab item	December 1, 2020
Live On	Live On script book	February 1, 2021

=== Brand ===
Brand Name	Released
ppibib	March 3, 2021
Nearest but Lost	May 10, 2021
Open Hour	May 20, 2021
