= Global business track =

A global business track is a specialized course of study in business. Originally, a business track was a practical study of business and a wide range of social science instruction. A global business track aims to nurture international students who have English language skills and international-business sense.

A global business track also helps students compete in a global environment. It provides global vision for fresh man who has wide international stage. So they can make their dreams come true who has global vision and interests global economy. It provides an environment where international students can participate with Korean students.

In Korea, a global business track is used at Sungkyunkwan University, Gachon University, and Sangmyung University.
