= Seo Ye-hwa =

South Korean actress (born 1989)

- Born: 8 March 1989 (age 37); Seoul, South Korea
- Other name: Seo Yi-hwa
- Occupation: Actress
- Years active: 2008–present
- Agent: Namoo Actors

Korean name
- Hangul: 서예화
- RR: Seo Yehwa
- MR: Sŏ Yehwa

Seo Ye-hwa (Korean: 서예화; born 8 March 1989) is a South Korean actress. She is known for her roles in dramas such as Extracurricular (2020), Backstreet Rookie (2020) and Vincenzo (2021).

== Biography and career ==
She was born on March 8, 1989, in Seoul, South Korea. She joined Namoo Actors and she made her debut as an actress in 2008. She appeared in drama Flower Grandpa Investigation Unit as Lee Soo-jung. After that she appeared in several dramas such as Vincenzo, Backstreet Rookie, Extracurricular and Her Private Life.

== Filmography ==
=== Television series ===
Year	Title	Role	Ref.
2014	Flower Grandpa Investigation Unit	Lee Soo-jung	
2016	Thumping Spike	Kim Mi-jin	
2016	Thumping Spike 2	Kim Mi-jin	
2017	Good Manager	Je-ri	
2017	Age of Youth 2	Su & Su receptionist	
2018	Lawless Lawyer	Geum-ja	
2019	Her Private Life	Yoo Kyung-ah	
2020	Extracurricular	Na Sung-mi	
2020	Backstreet Rookie	Hwang Geum-bi	
2020	Get Revenge	Happy Credit person	
2021	Vincenzo	Jang Yeon-jin	
2021	Police University	Baek-hee	
2021–2022	Moonshine	Cheon-Geum	
2023	Not Others	Im Tae-kyung	
2023	A Time Called You	Seo Na-eun	
2024	Queen of Tears	Kim Ye-na	
2024	O'PENing: Grand Shining Hotel	Ahn Ji-hye	
2024	Goodbye Earth	So Joo-yeon	
2025	Motel California	Esther Park	

== Theater ==
Theater play performances of Seo Ye-hwa
Year	Title		Role	Venue	Date	Ref.
Year	English	Korean	Role	Venue	Date	Ref.
2019–2020	Memory in Dream	메모리 인 드림	Alice	Haeoreum Arts Theater	8 November 2019 – 19 January 2020	
2023	Our Little Sister	바닷마을 다이어리	Yoshino	Seoul Arts Center	October 8 to November 19	

== Awards and nominations ==
- 2020 SBS Drama Awards nominated for Best New Actress in Backstreet Rookie
