= Cho Yu-jung =

South Korean actress (born 1999)

- Born: September 17, 1999 (age 27); Sangju, South Korea
- Other name: Jo Yoo-jung
- Education: Sookmyung Girls' High School; Dongguk University (Department of Theatre)
- Occupation: Actress
- Years active: 2018–present
- Agent(s): J,Wide-Company

Korean name
- Hangul: 조유정
- RR: Jo Yujeong
- MR: Cho Yujŏng
- Website: Official website

Cho Yu-jung (Korean: 조유정; born September 17, 1999), is a South Korean actress.

== Career ==
Cho Yu-jung made her debut in the 2018 television series SBS TV’s Still 17. On March 13, 2023, Cho signed an exclusive contract with J,Wide-Company.

Cho made her film debut in 2025 in the romance film Even If This Love Disappears From the World Tonight, directed by Kim Hye-young.

== Filmography ==
=== Film ===
| Year | Title | Role | Ref. |
|---|---|---|---|
| 2025 | Even If This Love Disappears From the World Tonight | Choi Ji-min | |

=== Television series ===
| Year | Title | Role | Ref. |
|---|---|---|---|
| 2018 | Still 17 | Lee Ri-an | |
| 2019 | I Wanna Hear Your Song | Yoo Je-ni | |
| 2019 | Love Alarm | Monsoon | |
| 2019–2020 | Beautiful Love, Wonderful Life | Kim Yeon-ah | |
| 2020 | Record of Youth | Won Hae-na | |
| 2021 | Adult Trainee | Ban Yu-ra | |
| 2022 | Recipe for Farewell | Shin Yeo-jin | |
