= Adult Trainee =

2021 South Korean web series

- Promotional poster
- Hangul: 어른연습생
- RR: Eoreun yeonseupsaeng
- MR: Ŏrŭn yŏnsŭpsaeng
- Genre: Romantic comedy; Teen
- Screenplay by: Kim Hyeon-min; Bang So-min; Jin Yun-ju
- Directed by: Yoo Hak-chan; Jeong Hyeong-gun
- Starring: Ryu Ui-hyun; Cho Mi-yeon; Cho Yu-jung; Ryeoun; Kwon Young-eun; Kim Min-gi
- Country of origin: South Korea
- Original language: Korean
- No. of episodes: 7

Production
- Executive producers: Jinnie Choi; Kim Dong-gu
- Production companies: CJ ENM; DK E&M

Original release
- Network: TVING
- Release: November 12, 2021 – November 2021

Adult Trainee (Korean: 어른연습생) is a South Korean web series directed by Yoo Hak-chan and Jeong Hyeong-gun, starring Ryu Ui-hyun, Cho Mi-yeon, Cho Yu-jung, Ryeoun, Kwon Young-eun, and Kim Min-gi. The series depicts a pink comedy about Generation Z who have grown up. This multi-part series was released on TVING starting with episodes "Jae-min" on November 12, "Yu-ra" on November 19 and "Na-eun" on November 26, 2021.

== Synopsis ==
The series follows a group of young people and their struggles with love, and it's divided in three parts.

The first part tells the story of Jae-min (Ryu Ui-hyun), a student addicted to masturbation and accepts the "Stop Masturbation in a 100 Days Challenge" in order to confess to the girl he likes, Ye-kyung (Cho Mi-yeon).

The second part tells the story of Yu-ra (Cho Yu-jung), a wannabe girl crush who in reality is a naive, delicate, religious girl, whose boyfriend leaves her because she is too "conservative". A change comes when to save face, she convinces acquaintance Nam-ho (Ryeoun) to pretend to date her; she believes she has no interest in him, but to her surprise, she begins to be drawn to his wild and edgy nature.

The third and last part is the story of the mysterious J, who appeared in front of Na-eun (Kwon Young-eun), an overweight girl who has never received anyone's attention, and thus decides to find J's identity.

== Cast ==
=== Main ===
- Ryu Ui-hyun as Seo Jae-min

A skinny boy sensitive to skinship and addicted to masturbation.

- Cho Mi-yeon as Bang Ye-kyung

Jae-min's classmate.

- Cho Yu-jung as Yu-ra

A conservative girl who starts a dangerous departure from her boyfriend.

- Ryeoun as Nam-ho

Yu-ra's handsome boyfriend.

- Kwon Young-eun as Son Na-eun

An overweight, sensitive and imaginative girl who is looking for a boyish boyfriend.

- Kim Min-gi as Choi Kang-joon

A popular idol-turned-student.

=== Supporting ===
- Kang Yi-seok as Kim Sung-jae

"Stop Masturbation" club leader.

- Lee Chan-hyeong as Song Yi-joon
- Jang Sung-yoon as Song Hye-bin
- Park Se-hyun as Kang Da-hyun
- Jo Sung-joon as Jin Beom

=== Special appearance ===
- Lee Seon-hee as Na-eun's mother
- Lee Hwi-won
- Song Chae-yoon
- Kim Han-jong
- Yoo Ji-yeon

== Production ==
The series, directed by Yoo Hak-chan and Jeong Hyeong-gun, was first announced on October 13, 2021, with the release of a provocative teaser poster.

The writers of the series, Kim Hyeon-min, Bang So-min, and Jin Yun-ju, won the CJ ENM's O'PEN contest, a project that supports new storytellers.
