= Extracurricular (TV series) =

2020 South Korean television series

- Promotional poster
- Hangul: 인간수업
- Hanja: 人間授業
- Lit.: Human Class
- RR: Ingansueop
- MR: In'gansuŏp
- Genre: Coming-of-age; Crime thriller; Psychological drama
- Written by: Jin Han-sae
- Directed by: Kim Jin-min
- Starring: Kim Dong-hee; Park Ju-hyun; Jung Da-bin; Nam Yoon-su; Choi Min-soo; Park Hyuk-kwon; Kim Yeo-jin
- Country of origin: South Korea
- Original language: Korean
- No. of episodes: 10

Production
- Executive producer: Yoon Shin-ae
- Producer: Greg Lee
- Camera setup: Single camera
- Running time: 44–72 minutes
- Production company: Studio 329

Original release
- Network: Netflix
- Release: April 29, 2020

Extracurricular (Korean: 인간수업) is a 2020 South Korean television series directed by Kim Jin-min, starring Kim Dong-hee, Park Ju-hyun, Jung Da-bin, Nam Yoon-su, Choi Min-soo, Park Hyuk-kwon, and Kim Yeo-jin. It was released on Netflix on April 29, 2020.

== Cast ==
=== Main ===
- Kim Dong-hee as Oh Ji-soo
- Park Ju-hyun as Bae Gyu-ri
- Jung Da-bin as Seo Min-hee
- Nam Yoon-su as Kwak Ki-tae
- Choi Min-soo as Lee Wang-chul
- Park Hyuk-kwon as Cho Jin-woo
- Kim Yeo-jin as Lee Hae-gyoung

=== Recurring ===
- Seo Ye-hwa as Na Sung-mi
- Kim Yi-kyung as Kim Ji-ye
- Park Bo-mi as Cho Min-joo
- Jang Se-rim as Yoo Eun-chae
- Kwak Hee-joo as Lee Tae-rim
- Kim Gyu-tae as Lim Tae-woo
- Kwon Han-sol as Hye-min
- Woo Da-bi as Soo-ji
- Kang Seol as Na-eun
- Lee Jae-baek as Kang-bbang
- Choi Joon-gyu as Chae-bin
- Kim Byung-hwi as Tae-nam
- Park Ho-san as Oh Jung-jin
- Shim Yi-young as Cho Hye-yeon, Gyu-ri's mother
- Kim Young-pil as Gyu-ri's father
- Baek Joo-hee as Cho Mi-jung
- Lim Gi-hong as Ryu Dae-yeol
- Kim Kwang-kyu as Nam Byung-kwan
- Lee Seung-woo as Shin Kyung-shik
- Oh Kwang-rok as Jae-ik
- Lee Hyun-gul as Du-gi
- Cheon Dong-bin as Jung-hwan

== Episodes ==
No.	Title	Directed by	Written by	Original release date
1	"Episode 1"	Kim Jin-min	Jin Han-sae	April 29, 2020
Oh Ji-soo, a top student who was abandoned by his parents when he was in ninth grade, lives a quiet life in the eyes of Mr. Cho, his homeroom teacher. He actually works as a security service provider for an illegal prostitution business under the name "Uncle" with the help of Lee Wang-chul, also called "Old Man", who protects the sex workers and transfers the money to Ji-soo. His classmate Seo Min-hee is one of the workers, though she does not know who "Uncle" is. One weekend, Ji-soo has a study project to do for the Social Issues Research club with Bae Gyu-ri, a girl he has a crush on, and thus tells Mr. Lee to take the day off. Knowing that she won't be protected, Min-hee still accepts the offer of a blacklisted client unaware that he had previously assaulted one of the sex workers and that she is walking into a trap. She sends the alert and Ji-soo eventually leaves Gyu-ri to save her, calling the police but giving the wrong motel room in order to merely scare off the client. The latter takes a picture of Min-hee before leaving and intends to upload it on the high school's website at a PC bang before he is stopped by Mr. Lee. In a bus, it is revealed that Gyu-ri is the one who stole the expensive phone case (that Min-hee had bought for her boyfriend) when she receives a message from a potential buyer and tries to resell it at a higher price. Back at school, as Ji-soo is sleeping alone at his desk, Gyu-ri who noticed before that Ji-soo had another phone confirms what she previously saw.
2	"Episode 2"	Kim Jin-min	Jin Han-sae	April 29, 2020
Gyu-ri steals Ji-soo's business phone, finds the password and starts blackmailing him. Through the app, Gyu-ri accepts Min-hee's request to go to a client's room where she has a panic attack due to her PTSD and requires Mr. Lee's help. Ji-soo starts tracking his second phone, having a violent encounter with Ki-tae – Min-hee's bully boyfriend – in the process, but Gyu-ri outsmarts him. Ji-soo's father wants to take him to Ulsan where he now lives but his son sees that he is only doing so because he needs money. Afraid of leaving his home because the blackmailer threatened to expose him, Ji-soo is visited by Gyu-ri who finds a way to make him leave the apartment and searches for the money. She hides when Ji-soo's father sneaks into the apartment and accidentally discovers the money before stealing it. She chases him, in vain. In the street, Ji-soo sees his father fleeing with the money and discovers that Gyu-ri is the blackmailer. The following day, she tells her classmates that Ji-soo is her boyfriend in order to stop Ki-tae from bullying him. She takes Ji-soo to a baseball batting cage and shows off her muscly friends, offering him to recruit them to expand his business and make up for the loss of money.
3	"Episode 3"	Kim Jin-min	Jin Han-sae	April 29, 2020
Gyu-ri follows Ji-soo to Ulsan where they break into Ji-soo's father's house and search for the stolen money but find nothing. Gyu-ri argues that Ji-soo is a pimp but he insists that he is only a security service provider and falls asleep after she refuses to explain why she needs money when her family is rich. In the morning, they catch Ji-soo's father and learn that he invested all the money in cryptocurrency. They witness as he loses more than 90% of the money and Ji-soo glares at a kitchen knife but restrains himself from stabbing his father. Back in Seoul, Ji-soo is struggling financially and cannot pay Mr. Lee who refuses to work until he receives his monthly payment. Mr. Lee tries to convince Min-hee to stop working but she refuses, and when Sung-mi – Min-hee's colleague who was assaulted by the same client – pressures other sex workers to look for another security service provider, Min-hee says she will only work with Mr. Lee who himself will only work with Uncle. Gyu-ri offers money to Ji-soo in exchange for a partnership in his business but he refuses. After failing his midterm exam, because he had to work part-time and was too mentally and physically exhausted to study, Ji-soo has a breakdown and hits his classmate Chae-bin in the face before accepting Gyu-ri's offer.
4	"Episode 4"	Kim Jin-min	Jin Han-sae	April 29, 2020
Now able to pay Mr. Lee, Ji-soo tells him that they are back in business. Mr. Lee suggests that Min-hee should stop working: even though she did not say she would quit, she seems unwilling to him. In a billiard room, Ki-tae gives Chae-bin advice on how to bully Ji-soo without Gyu-ri knowing (since she is protected by juniors and seniors, including the judo team). Gyu-ri shows Ji-soo that many students do illegal businesses and then try to recruit her judo friends by sending them messaging spams, but fails. At school, a detective specialized in juvenile crime called Lee Hae-gyoung, who has been investigating a possible case about sex trafficking of a minor since she saw a teenager leaving a motel a few weeks earlier, encounters students smoking and recognizes Min-hee's bag. Chae-bin breaks Ji-soo's chair and paints his locker in black, before putting an adult toy for men box in his backpack and tipping off a teacher with the help of Ki-tae. Consequently, the teacher enters the classroom and starts searching the bags of each student. Ji-soo, who had been keeping his money in his bag to prevent his father from stealing it again, stands up and says that he does not consent to the search.
5	"Episode 5"	Kim Jin-min	Jin Han-sae	April 29, 2020
Ji-soo uses the human rights card but the teacher forces his way into the bag and is about to see what's in it when Gyu-ri activates the school's fire alarm. She later suggests to Ji-soo to hide the money in the sofa of the counseling office where she usually hides her stolen items, and they discover the men toy in his bag. Gyu-ri's mother is waiting for her at the school's exit and offers Ji-soo a ride; she questions them about their relationship and reprimands her daughter about the fire alarm incident. It is revealed that Gyu-ri previously tried to commit suicide by cutting her wrists. During Ki-tae's birthday party, at Banana Karaoke Club, Min-hee gifts him a cap that he finds cheap which angers her. She leaves and runs into Sung-mi who is here to find a new "insurance company" (the karaoke club is only a front for prostitution) as she stopped working for Uncle; Min-hee pretends not to know her. Gyu-ri succeeds in recruiting their first male sex worker: Lee Tae-rim, an idol trainee with money problems from her mother's company. At school, Min-hee gives Ji-soo the cap after bumping into him in the corridor which makes Gyu-ri jealous. As she and Ji-soo open the counseling office's door, they see Min-hee and detective Lee Hae-gyoung sitting opposite each other.
6	"Episode 6"	Kim Jin-min	Jin Han-sae	April 29, 2020
Ji-soo and Gyu-ri each find a way to stop Min-hee from revealing the reason why she was at the motel to detective Lee Hae-gyoung. Sung-mi announces to her colleagues (excluding Min-hee) that she found a new broker and they all leave Uncle's chatroom. Gyu-ri convinces Ji-soo to fire Min-hee – having Mr. Lee resetting her phone to erase all trace of her working for Uncle – which she does not take well. At school, Ki-tae assaults Ji-soo for looking at his girlfriend (whom he is only keeping a close eye on to protect himself), asking him why a detective was talking to Min-hee, but Ji-soo does not say anything and Gyu-ri eventually tells Ki-tae a lie to protect the business. After school, Min-hee takes Ji-soo to Mr. Lee, hoping that he will help her get severance pay, but he is unable to say anything even though Mr. Lee does not seem to know his second identity. In the meantime, Dae-yeol (the karaoke club's owner) sets a trap for Tae-rim, whom he suspects of having offered his services to his girlfriend Mi-jung in the form of compensated dating, and intends to kill him the Dexter way. As the phone numbers do not match, Tae-rim is forced to take Dae-yeol and his men to Mr. Lee, who is still with Min-hee and Ji-soo. Mr. Lee quickly catches on and tells them to leave but Min-hee persists and they end up seeing Mr. Lee fight the men. Dae-yeol eventually hits Mr. Lee on the back with an ax, but he succeeds in escaping with Min-hee, leaving Ji-soo on his own. Dae-yeol catches him and realizes that Ji-soo's phone matches the number on his girlfriend's phone.
7	"Episode 7"	Kim Jin-min	Jin Han-sae	April 29, 2020
Min-hee contacts Lee Hae-gyoung who takes her and Mr. Lee to the hospital. The detective tries to get information from Min-hee after finding out that someone named Ji-soo was taken by the men who assaulted Mr. Lee, but Min-hee panics and Mr. Cho decides to take her home. Dae-yeol's man starts sawing Ji-soo's arm but is interrupted by Mi-jung. She is angry at Dae-yeol about his behavior, and does not recognize Ji-soo which allows him to convince Dae-yeol that he is only a middleman, letting his kidnapper believe that Mr. Lee is the real boss. Dae-yeol starts questioning Ji-soo about the business he works for, which leads Ji-soo to call Uncle's phone, currently in the possession of Gyu-ri. She decides not to give information about how they work but becomes interested in the karaoke club's business as all their workers left, not knowing that they are now working at the karaoke club. Min-hee opens up to Ki-tae about her work but she learns that he already knew, and when he threatens to tell everyone about it, she does not seem to care and leaves. Mr. Lee wakes up and tells Min-hee to bring his phone; she soon realizes that the police took it. She warns Uncle but it is too late: Ji-soo already answered the phone thinking it was Mr. Lee. Lee Hae-gyoung now believes that the sex trafficking case might be bigger than she thought. Panicked and afraid, Ji-soo is against Gyu-ri's idea of working with the karaoke club, telling her that she is always at a safe distant compared to him, so she tells him she will handle them.
8	"Episode 8"	Kim Jin-min	Jin Han-sae	April 29, 2020
One year ago, homeless Mr. Lee saves Ji-soo from his bullies who were stealing a large amount of banknotes from him, suggesting that Ji-soo was already working as a broker. Mr. Lee goes back to his spot and Ji-soo leaves a phone next to him (the same one Mr. Lee still uses in the present day to contact Uncle). Back in 2020, Min-hee has stopped going to school and Ji-soo visits her at the hospital where she stays at Mr. Lee's bedside, trying to convince her not to talk to the police. He then has a conversation with Mr. Lee who implies that he knows about his other identity. Ki-tae questions Gyu-ri about the reason why she lied for Min-hee. Ji-soo gets a phone call from Dae-yeol who tells him that he is meeting Uncle later in the day, proving that Gyu-ri is sticking to her promise to handle them, which worries Ji-soo. Ki-tae starts looking into prostitution chatrooms to find out who was employing Min-hee. Lee Hae-gyoung and two police officers go to the hospital to question Mr. Lee but he escapes with Min-hee. Gyu-ri goes to the meeting only to find out that Ji-soo is already there, having told Dae-yeol and Mi-jung that his boss could not come. Dae-yeol informs him that he will have to drop out of school and work full-time for him, threatening him of knowing the school he goes to. He gives Ji-soo a herbal medicine box to give to his boss which actually contains money and a hidden tracker. Ji-soo leaves it at the bus stop without opening it, and Gyu-ri hides it in the counseling office after discovering the money. As Ji-soo's dreams of going to college and finding a job are shattered, he blames Gyu-ri for everything that happened since she started working with him. Under the identity of Uncle, she tells Dae-yeol that she refuses to take the money and thus to be his partner, but he finds out who she is with the help of the tracking device and kidnaps her.
9	"Episode 9"	Kim Jin-min	Jin Han-sae	April 29, 2020
Dae-yeol calls Ji-soo with Gyu-ri's phone and tells him to come if he wants her to live. He comes and Dae-yeol's man knocks him unconscious; he dreams of a conversation he has with his father followed by a discussion with Mr. Cho in which he admits to himself that he is a pimp and not a security provider. Gyu-ri stabs Dae-yeol multiple times; she and Ji-soo escape. They rest at a motel and are about to kiss before Gyu-ri turns away; they laugh after mistaking the siren of an ambulance for a police car's and Ji-soo asks what they are going to do. When Ji-soo is asleep, Gyu-ri leaves with Uncle's phone. Min-hee is still hiding with Mr. Lee who is determined to take his revenge on Dae-yeol. After he leaves her alone, Min-hee goes to the police station and asks Detective Lee to look for Dae-yeol's car. Gyu-ri sneaks into the karaoke club and exchanges the phone used by Dae-yeol to call Ji-soo with Uncle's phone, but is caught by Dae-yeol who starts choking her. Ki-tae, who was informed that Min-hee's broker works at the karaoke club, comes to the club with other high schoolers holding metal pipes and bats, interrupting Dae-yeol. The club's people and the students start fighting each other; the latter are helped by Mr. Lee who came to take his revenge on Dae-yeol. Mr. Lee runs into Ji-soo and tells him they should never meet again. Dae-yeol and Mr. Lee fight on the roof, eventually killing each other. Detective Lee finds Dae-yeol's car and calls for reinforcement when she sees the fight. Ki-tae finds the cap (lost by Ji-soo during the fight) that Min-hee wanted to gift him at his birthday before he is taken by the police. On the rooftop, Detective Lee discovers Dae-yeol and Mr. Lee's bodies in puddles of blood.
10	"Episode 10"	Kim Jin-min	Jin Han-sae	April 29, 2020
At the police station, Ki-tae is pressured to explain why he and other students sacked the karaoke club. Ji-soo wants to stop being a broker against Gyu-ri advice. Min-hee mourns Mr. Lee's death, blaming Ji-soo for stopping her from going to the police before things got out of hand. Her secret is now out and classmates start bullying her. Gyu-ri threatens her parents saying she will leak proof that Lee Tae-rim was a sex worker – which puts at risk an investment that her mother's company is waiting for – if they do not give her a large sum of money. Ji-soo dreams that he is burying Min-hee's body before it changes into his. Gyu-ri buys a one-way ticket to Sydney and asks Ji-soo to go with her, but he declines the offer. He tries to ask Mr. Cho for help but changes his mind. Detective Lee, in possession of Dae-yeol's phones (including the one with the tracking device app), discovers the hidden money in the counseling room and takes Mr. Cho to the police station. Ki-tae confronts Min-hee, showing her the cap he found at the karaoke bar, and she realizes that Ji-soo was there. Connecting the dots, she calls Ji-soo and asks him to meet her. Ji-soo eventually admits he is Uncle and that Gyu-ri was involved, then goes on his knees and apologizes, which Min-hee records on her phone. When he realizes it, he asks her not to do anything and leave Gyu-ri out of it as he is about to turn himself in, but she refuses. They fight for the phone and she accidentally falls down the stairs. The back of her head starts bleeding; Ji-soo takes the phone and leaves. He asks Gyu-ri for help and is all packed when Ki-tae visits him: the latter now knows from Mi-jung that Ji-soo was Min-hee's broker. When Ki-tae discovers Min-hee's phone covered in blood, he stabs Ji-soo multiple times with a pair of scissors before Gyu-ri knocks him unconscious. She and Ji-soo leave the apartment. Detective Lee suspects the Social Issues Research club members and especially Ji-soo despite Mr. Cho describing him as a good student. She arrives at Ji-soo's apartment but it is empty, Ki-tae having left the apartment in the meantime. She follows the traces of blood from the apartment to the building's stairwell where Ji-soo had told Gyu-ri to leave without him, but no one is there.

== Production ==
=== Development ===
On April 22, 2019, Netflix announced through a press release that it would distribute a new Korean original series entitled Extracurricular and produced by Studio 329, confirming at the same time that the main cast would consist of Kim Dong-hee, Jung Da-bin, Park Ju-hyun, Nam Yoon-soo, Choi Min-soo, Park Hyuk-kwon and Kim Yeo-jin. The series is written by Song Ji-na's son Jin Han-sae and directed by Kim Jin-min, whose wife Kim Yeo-jin is starring in the series.

=== Filming ===
Filming, which ended on August 6, 2019, mostly took place in Seoul.

=== Promotion ===
On April 28, 2020, the press conference was held online due to the coronavirus pandemic, in presence of actors Kim Dong-hee, Jung Da-bin, Park Ju-hyun and Nam Yoon-soo, executive producer (and Studio 329's CEO) Yoon Shin-ae, and director Kim Jin-min. The series being released a few months after the Nth room case opened, director Kim said that "the incident was so shocking that [he] felt frightened. Extracurricular could become an opportunity to discuss this uncomfortable reality. As a creator, [he] felt [he] had to deal with the issues of our society with more depth and responsibility."

On April 29, some of the cast and crew attended a special one-day class by Professors Kwon Il-yong (South Korea's first profiler), Park Mi-rang (a criminologist) and Seo Min-soo (from the Police Human Resources Development Institute), which was broadcast live on Netflix Korea's YouTube and V Live channels. They discussed the reality of youth crime in society.

== Release ==
On March 19, 2020, Netflix Korea announced through Twitter that the series would be released on April 29. On April 16, the official trailer was released.

== Reception ==
=== Audience viewership ===
Extracurricular was the ninth most-watched South Korean series on Netflix in 2020.

=== Critical response ===
John Serba of Decider said that "Extracurricular is good, funny stuff. The debut episode's near-miss ending isn't entirely satisfying, but that's not likely to stop you from binging the crap out of this show."

The series has also "gained rave reviews for its clear depiction of the struggles of teenage students."

=== Awards and nominations ===
Year	Award	Category	Recipient	Result	Ref.
2021	57th Baeksang Arts Awards	Best Drama	Extracurricular	Nominated	
2021	57th Baeksang Arts Awards	Best New Actor (TV)	Nam Yoon-su	Nominated	
2021	57th Baeksang Arts Awards	Best New Actress (TV)	Park Ju-hyun	Won	
