= Kim Jin-min =

South Korean television director (born 1972)

- Born: 1972 (age 53–54)
- Occupation: Television director
- Spouse: Kim Yeo-jin (m. 2004)

Korean name
- Hangul: 김진민
- RR: Gim Jinmin
- MR: Kim Chinmin

Kim Jin-min (born 1972) is a South Korean television director.

== Career ==
Kim Jin-min left MBC in 2016 and signed with Bon Factory.

== Personal life ==
Kim Jin-min met his future wife actress Kim Yeo-jin in 2003 on the set of Forever Love. They married in February 2004.

== Filmography ==
=== Television ===
Year	Title	Network	Notes	Ref.
2003	Forever Love	MBC		
2004	Best Theater: That Man Is Suspicious	MBC		
2004-2005	The Age of Heroes	MBC		
2005-2006	Shin Don	MBC		
2006	Best Theater: Who Lives in That House?	MBC		
2007	Best Theater: Bong-jae, Come Back	MBC		
2007	Time Between Dog and Wolf	MBC		
2008	Bitter Sweet Life	MBC		
2010	Road No. 1	MBC		
2012	God of War (TV series)	MBC		
2014–2015	Pride and Prejudice	MBC		
2016	Marriage Contract	MBC		
2017	The Liar and His Lover	tvN		
2018	Lawless Lawyer	tvN		
2020	Extracurricular	Netflix		
2021	My Name	Netflix		
2024	Goodbye Earth	Netflix		
2026	The Art of Sarah	Netflix		

== Awards ==
- 9th Korea Drama Awards: Best Production Director for Marriage Contract.
