= A-Teen 2 =

2019 South Korean web series

- Promotional poster
- Hangul: 에이틴2
- RR: Eitin2
- MR: Eit'in2
- Genre: Coming-of-age
- Written by: Kim Sa-ra
- Directed by: Han Soo-ji
- Starring: Lee Na-eun; Choi Bo-min; Kim Dong-hee; Kang Min-ah; Kim Su-hyun; Ryu Ui-hyun; Shin Ye-eun; Shin Seung-ho
- Country of origin: South Korea
- Original language: Korean
- No. of episodes: 20

Production
- Executive producer: Song Joo-sung
- Producer: Lee Yoon-jae
- Production company: PlayList Global

Original release
- Network: Naver TV Cast; V Live; YouTube; Facebook
- Release: April 25 – June 30, 2019

Related
- A-Teen (2018)

A-Teen 2 (Korean: 에이틴2; RR: Eitin2) is a 2019 South Korean streaming television series which is the sequel to the 2018 web series A-Teen. It aired on Naver TV Cast from April 25 to June 30, 2019, every Thursday and Sunday at 19:00 (KST).

The web drama accumulated 35 million views within two weeks of its premiere. Wanting celebrate this achievement, part of the cast held a fan meeting on June 13, 2019. As of September 2019, the Korean and English versions of the series on YouTube have a combined view count of 60 million.

== Synopsis ==
The series tells about seven students who learn the joy and hardship of being 19-year-old teenagers.

== Cast ==
=== Main ===
- Lee Na-eun as Kim Ha-na/Kim Jo-yeon
- Choi Bo-min as Ryu Joo-ha
- Shin Ye-eun as Do Ha-na
- Shin Seung-ho as Nam Shi-woo
- Kim Dong-hee as Ha-min
- Kim Su-hyeon as Yeo Bo-ram
- Ryu Ui-hyun as Cha Gi-hyun
- Kang Min-ah as Cha Ah-hyun

=== Supporting ===
- Ahn Jung-hoon as Nam Ji-woo
- Cho Young-in as Kim Min-ji

=== Cameo appearances ===
- Hyungseo as a student (Ep. 2)
- Joshua as Ryu Joo-ha's friend (Ep. 7)
- Baek Soo-hee as Lee Jeong-min (Ep. 8)
- Jeon Hye-yeon as Park Jin-ho (Ep. 11)
- Kim Min-ju as a restaurant employee (Ep. 11)
- Hyunjin as Cha Ah-Hyun's friends (Ep. 16)
- I.N as Cha Ah-Hyun's friends (Ep. 16)

== Original soundtrack ==
A-Teen 2 OST

Soundtrack album by Various artists
- Released: 2019
- Genre: Soundtrack
- Languages: Korean; English
- Labels: PlayList Global; Kakao M

=== Part 1 ===
Released on May 9, 2019
No.	Title	Lyrics	Music	Artist	Length
1.	"Lean on Me" (스며들기 좋은 오늘)	Baek Ye-rin; d.ear	d.ear	Baek Ye-rin	3:30
2.	"Lean on Me" (Inst.)		d.ear		3:30
Total length:					7:00

=== Part 2 ===
Released on May 19, 2019
No.	Title	Lyrics	Music	Artist	Length
1.	"9-Teen"	Woozi; Bumzu	Woozi; Bumzu; S.Coups; Mingyu	Seventeen	3:17
Total length:					3:17

=== Part 3 ===
Released on June 20, 2019
No.	Title	Lyrics	Music	Artist	Length
1.	"I Wonder" (궁금해)	Ham Byeong-seon (9z)	Ham Byeong-seon (9z); Jeong Won-jung; Hwang Seong-soo; Ham Phillip; Kim bo-ram	We Are The Night	3:29
2.	"I Wonder" (Inst.)		Ham Byeong-seon (9z); Jeong Won-jung; Hwang Seong-soo; Ham Phillip; Kim bo-ram		3:29
Total length:					6:58

== List of episodes ==
Ep.	Original broadcast date	Title
1	April 25, 2019	Rumors Spread About Me at School
2	April 28, 2019	I Made My Friend Cry
3	May 2, 2019	A Total Stranger Cursed at Me
4	May 5, 2019	My Worst Mistake
5	May 9, 2019	Two People Want the Same Person
6	May 12, 2019	Why Lies Aren't So Bad
7	May 16, 2019	The Two of Them Had a Secret Date
8	May 19, 2019	A Guy Only I Want to Know
9	May 23, 2019	My Close Friend Has Become My Competitor
10	May 26, 2019	Someone Who Makes Me Anxious
11	May 30, 2019	I Pretended to Be a Couple with Someone I Like
12	June 2, 2019	My Girlfriend Talked Badly About My Family
13	June 6, 2019	The Reason My Friend Fainted in a Classroom
14	June 9, 2019	My Video Got Tons of Malicious Comments
15	June 13, 2019	When You Find Out How the Other Person Really Feels
16	June 16, 2019	My Secret Crush Finally Ended
17	June 20, 2019	My Friend Wanted to See Me the Day Before the Exam
18	June 23, 2019	A Friend I Trusted Betrayed Me
19	June 27, 2019	I Talked Rudely to A Senior I Met for the First Time
20	June 30, 2019	Thank You for Being A Part of Our 19
