= A-Teen =

South Korean web series

- Promotional poster
- Hangul: 에이틴
- RR: Eitin
- MR: Eit'in
- Genre: Teen; Coming-of-age; Romance
- Written by: Kim Sa-ra
- Directed by: Han Soo-ji
- Starring: Shin Ye-eun; Lee Na-eun; Shin Seung-ho; Kim Dong-hee; Kim Su-hyun; Ryu Ui-hyun
- Country of origin: South Korea
- Original language: Korean
- No. of episodes: 24

Production
- Executive producer: Song Joo-sung
- Running time: 9–16 minutes
- Production company: PlayList Global

Original release
- Network: Naver TV Cast; V Live; YouTube; Facebook
- Release: 1 July – 16 September 2018

A-Teen (Korean: 에이틴; RR: Eitin) is a South Korean streaming television series. A production of Naver subsidiary PlayList Global, the first season aired on Naver TV Cast from 1 July to 16 September 2018, every Wednesday and Sunday at 19:00 (KST). It is the sequel to the web drama Seventeen. Unlike the prequel, this drama deals with the stories of high school students turning 18. Venue sponsorship is the same as Seventeen. A second season premiered on April 25, 2019.

== Synopsis ==
The story of six students and how they deal with their teenage years.

== Cast ==
=== Main ===
- Shin Ye-eun as Do Ha-na
- Lee Na-eun as Kim Ha-na
- Shin Seung-ho as Nam Shi-woo
- Kim Dong-hee as Ha Min
- Kim Su-hyun as Yeo Bo-ram
- Ryoo Ui-hyun as Cha Gi-hyun

=== Supporting ===
- Choi Won-myeong as Choi Won-myung
- Jo So-bin as Kim Na-hee
- Kim Si-eun as Park Ye-ji
- Baek Soo-hee as Lee Jeong-min
- Ahn Jung-hoon as Nam Ji-woo

=== Cameo appearances ===
- Jaemin as a student (Ep. 20)
- Jeno as a student (Ep. 20)
- Ddotty as a video game commentator
- Jung Gun-joo as a physical education teacher

== Original soundtrack ==
A-Teen OST

Soundtrack album by Various artists
- Released: 2018
- Genre: Soundtrack
- Languages: Korean; English
- Labels: PlayList Global; Kakao M

=== Part 1 ===
Released on July 15, 2018
| No. | Title | Lyrics | Music | Artist | Length |
|---|---|---|---|---|---|
| 1. | "You, Again" (자꾸만, 너) | So Soo-bin | So Soo-bin | So Soo-bin | 3:49 |
| 2. | "You, Again" (Inst.) | | So Soo-bin | | 3:49 |
| Total length: | | | | | 7:38 |

=== Part 2 ===
Released on August 5, 2018
| No. | Title | Lyrics | Music | Artist | Length |
|---|---|---|---|---|---|
| 1. | "I'll Be Your Star" (넌 내게 특별하고) | So Soo-bin | So Soo-bin | So Soo-bin | 3:24 |
| 2. | "I'll Be Your Star" (Inst.) | | So Soo-bin | | 3:24 |
| Total length: | | | | | 6:48 |

=== Part 3 ===
Released on August 13, 2018
| No. | Title | Lyrics | Music | Artist | Length |
|---|---|---|---|---|---|
| 1. | "9-Teen" | Bumzu; Woozi; Vernon; Dino | Bumzu; Woozi; Boombastic | Seventeen | 3:16 |

=== Part 4 ===
Released on September 16, 2018
| No. | Title | Lyrics | Music | Artist | Length |
|---|---|---|---|---|---|
| 1. | "Don't Run Away" (도망가지마) | Motte | Motte | Motte | 4:08 |
| 2. | "Don't Run Away" (Inst.) | | Motte | | 4:08 |
| Total length: | | | | | 8:16 |

== List of episodes ==
| Ep. | Original broadcast date | Title |
|---|---|---|
| 1 | July 1, 2018 | Unordinary, in Truth, Not Wanting to Be Ordinary |
| 2 | July 3, 2018 | When Someone Talks Behind My Back |
| 3 | July 4, 2018 | Getting Over an Ex Who Cheated on You |
| 4 | July 8, 2018 | I Was Asked Out During Finals |
| 5 | July 11, 2018 | Reason Why Friends Fight During Finals |
| 6 | July 15, 2018 | Reason Why It's Scary When a Quiet One Gets Upset |
| 7 | July 18, 2018 | Signs That Mean He's Into Her |
| 8 | July 22, 2018 | When You Feel Left Out By Your Friends |
| 9 | July 25, 2018 | When Close Friends Are About to Cut Ties |
| 10 | July 29, 2018 | When Someone Makes a Move on My Crush |
| 11 | August 1, 2018 | When a Man Gets Crazy Jealous |
| 12 | August 5, 2018 | He Makes My Heart Flutter |
| 13 | August 8, 2018 | I Stayed Up All Night With My Crush |
| 14 | August 12, 2018 | Parents That Play Favorites |
| 15 | August 15, 2018 | A Close Friend That I Can't Stand |
| 16 | August 19, 2018 | How to Tell If a Guy Likes You |
| 17 | August 22, 2018 | When You Confess Your Feelings About Her |
| 18 | August 26, 2018 | My Closest Friend Has Lied To Me |
| 19 | August 29, 2018 | It Makes Me Hate You, When I Love You So Much |
| 20 | September 2, 2018 | When My Friend Suspects Me In Front Of Others |
| 21 | September 5, 2018 | My School Life Is Falling Apart |
| 22 | September 9, 2018 | Can We Be Friends Again After Having a Big Fight? |
| 23 | September 12, 2018 | Unforgettable First Kiss.txt |
| 24 | September 16, 2018 | The One And Only People In My Eighteen |

== Reception ==
=== Viewership ===
The web drama accumulated six million views in one-month-and-a-half.

== Awards and nominations ==
=== Global V LIVE Awards ===
| Year | Recipient | Award | Result | Ref. |
|---|---|---|---|---|
| 2019 | A-Teen | Best V Original (Drama) | Won | |
