= Ryu Ui-hyun =

South Korean actor (born 1999)

- Born: April 15, 1999 (age 27); Seoul, South Korea
- Occupation: Actor
- Agent: Waze Company

Korean name
- Hangul: 류의현
- RR: Ryu Uihyeon
- MR: Ryu Ŭihyŏn

Ryu Ui-hyun (born April 15, 1999), a South Korean actor. He gained attention through his roles in web series A-Teen (2018), A-Teen 2 (2019) and Adult Trainee (2021).

== Filmography ==
=== Film ===
Year	Title	Role	Ref.
2009	Where is Ronny...	Chul-soo	
2009	The Righteous Thief	young Hong Moo-hyuk	
2010	The Recipe	young Park-min	
2010	A Better Tomorrow	young Kim Hyuk	
2010	The Man from Nowhere	Delivery boy	
2012	Pacemaker	young Joo Man-ho	
2012	Romance Joe	boy	
2014	For the Emperor	young Lee Hwan	
2018	Last Child	Oh Jung-seok	
2022	Flater	Park Gon	
TBA	Everyday We Are		

=== Television series ===
Year	Title	Role	Ref.
2007	New Heart		
2008	Bitter Sweet Life		
2008	You Stole My Heart		
2008	Spotlight		
2008	The Great King, Sejong		
2008	Beethoven Virus		
2009	High Kick Through the Roof		
2009	Can Anyone Love		
2010	Pink Lipstick	young Park Jung-woo	
2013	The Queen's Classroom	Jo Yeon-hoo	
2016	Shopping King Louie	Ko Bok-nam	
2017	Naked Fireman	young Oh Sung-jin	
2019–2020	Beautiful Love, Wonderful Life	Moon Pa-rang	
2020	Strange School Tales: "The Child Who Would Not Come"	Kang Dong-hee	
2021	River Where the Moon Rises	Tarasan	
2022–2023	Three Bold Siblings	Jang Soo-bin	

=== Web series ===
Year	Title	Role	Notes	Ref.
2018	A-Teen	Cha Gi-hyun		
2019	Can Love Be Refunded	Shrek		
2019	A-Teen 2	Cha Gi-hyun		
2020	Twenty Twenty	Cha Gi-hyun	Cameo	
2021	Adult Trainee	Jaemin	Episode 1–2	
2022	Two Universes	Baek Woo-joo		
