= Sky Castle =

2018–2019 South Korean television series

- Promotional poster
- Also known as: SKY Castle
- Hangul: SKY 캐슬
- RR: SKY kaeseul
- MR: SKY k'aesŭl
- Genre: Satire; Black comedy; Family; Mystery; Psychological drama
- Written by: Yoo Hyun-mi
- Directed by: Jo Hyun-tak
- Starring: Yum Jung-ah; Lee Tae-ran; Yoon Se-ah; Oh Na-ra; Kim Seo-hyung
- Music by: Kim Tae-seong
- Country of origin: South Korea
- Original language: Korean
- No. of episodes: 20 + special

Production
- Executive producer: Kim Ji-youn
- Producer: Joo Sang-kyoo
- Camera setup: Multi-camera
- Running time: 60–80 minutes
- Production companies: HB Entertainment; Drama House

Original release
- Network: JTBC
- Release: November 23, 2018 – February 1, 2019

Sky Castle (Korean: SKY 캐슬; stylized as SKY Castle) (Note: Pronounced as sky, but written as SKY (the acronym).) is a South Korean television series starring Yum Jung-ah, Lee Tae-ran, Yoon Se-ah, Oh Na-ra, and Kim Seo-hyung. It aired on JTBC on Fridays and Saturdays at 22:50 (KST), from November 23, 2018, to February 1, 2019.

At the time of airing, Sky Castle became the highest rated series in Korean cable television history. It received positive reviews from critics and won multiple awards, including four at the 55th Baeksang Arts Awards.

== Synopsis ==
A satirical series that closely looks at the materialistic desires of upper-class parents in South Korea and how they ruthlessly secure the successes of their families at the cost of destroying others' lives. The drama revolves around the lives of housewives residing in a luxurious residential area called SKY Castle (a reference to the elite universities) in suburban Seoul, where wealthy doctors and professors live. The wives are determined to make their husbands more successful and to raise their children to be top students who will be accepted at the best universities, so they use every possible way to achieve that.

Han Seo-jin (Yum Jung-ah) is married to an ambitious orthopedic surgeon, Kang Joon-sang (Jung Joon-ho). She wants her eldest daughter, Kang Ye-seo (Kim Hye-yoon), to also become a doctor. In order to do that, she hires Kim Joo-young (Kim Seo-hyung), a coordinator with a one hundred percent success rate when it comes to her students' admission to the Seoul National University.

No Seung-hye (Yoon Se-ah) is the wife of Cha Min-hyuk (Kim Byung-chul), a perfectionist law professor and a former prosecutor. She does not like the way her husband teaches their twin sons, Cha Seo-joon (Kim Dong-hee) and Cha Ki-joon (Jo Byeong-kyu). Later it is revealed that their daughter, Cha Se-ri (Park Yoo-na), who has always been Min-hyuk's pride since she attends Harvard University, hides something from them.

Jin Jin-hee (Oh Na-ra) is the mother of Woo Soo-han (Lee Eugene). She wants her son to be like her husband, Woo Yang-woo (Jo Jae-yoon), which means becoming a doctor. She befriends Seo-jin to get information and to achieve a perfect career and education for her family.

Following the suicide of Lee Myung-joo (Kim Jung-nan), mother of Park Young-jae (Song Geon-hee), who was a former student of Joo-young and recently admitted to the Seoul National University, Lee Soo-im (Lee Tae-ran)'s family moves into SKY Castle. Her husband, Hwang Chi-young (Choi Won-young), who is a talented neurosurgeon, works at the same hospital as Joon-sang and Yang-woo and her son, Hwang Woo-joo (Kang Chan-hee), attends the same school as Ye-seo. Her family often clashes with the other residents due to their differences in opinions.

== Cast ==
=== Main ===
- Yum Jung-ah as Han Seo-jin / Kwak Mi-hyang

An overzealous mother who wants nothing more than for her daughter to get into Seoul National University's medical school. She hides her past from everyone except her husband and in-laws who know that she grew up poor with an alcoholic father who sold oxblood and offal. She is the mother of Kang Ye-seo and Kang Ye-bin; the wife of Kang Joon-sang and the daughter-in-law of Madame Yoon.

- Lee Tae-ran as Lee Soo-im

A new member of the neighborhood and a writer, who disapproves of the other parents' methods for getting their kids to university, believing it is too harsh. She is disliked by the other parents for disrupting the status quo. She is aware of Seo-jin's real identity, as she knew her when they were younger. She is the stepmother of Hwang Woo-joo; the wife of Hwang Chi-young.

- Yoon Se-ah as No Seung-hye

A woman who befriends Soo-im, and starts to look down on how the other moms treat everyone and their kids. She changes her ways and becomes protective of her sons from their father's harsh teaching methods. She is the mother of Cha Se-ri, Cha Seo-joon, and Cha Ki-joon; the wife of Cha Min-hyuk.

- Oh Na-ra as Jin Jin-hee

A friend of Seo-jin tries to get her child to do everything with Seo-jin's daughter so he can be successful. She bribes Seo-jin with gifts into trusting her with information. But she finds it difficult to keep secrets. Her loyalty changes easily as well depending on who she is with. She is the mother of Woo Soo-han; the wife of Woo Yang-woo.

- Kim Seo-hyung as Kim Joo-young

She is a well-known tutor only accessible to the elite and only caters to two students at a time. Because of her 100% success rate in getting students accepted, Seo-jin was determined to hire her as her daughter's tutor. She tutored Young-jae and Ye-seo. She hides a past that she tries to escape from. She has a daughter, Kay (or Katherine), who was an acclaimed genius when they lived in Fairfax, USA, but however became permanently disabled due to a car accident, which is a huge source of pain and grief for Joo-Young.

=== Supporting ===
==== Kang family ====
- Jung Joon-ho as Kang Joon-sang

Seo-jin's husband. A well respected orthopedic surgeon at Joonam University Hospital,who is later promoted as the chief physician at the Spine & Joints Centre. He holds Min-hyuk in absolute contempt and delights in the latter's misfortunes. He is obsessed with maintaining a good track record. He appears to be moral and put off by dishonest behaviour but is actually ambitious and wants to climb the social ladder.

- Kim Hye-yoon as Kang Ye-seo

Seo-jin's elder daughter. Her dream is to enter Seoul National University's medical faculty and be a third generation doctor. She is studious, determined, and often aces her exams, but is pampered, and wilful. She has feelings for Woo-joo.

- Lee Ji-won as Kang Ye-bin

Seo-jin's younger daughter. She is cynical and often clashes with her sister and believes her parents only care for Ye-seo. She, however, gets along well with the other children in the complex and is the first one in the family to warm up to Hye-na.

- Jung Ae-ri as Madame Yoon

Joon-sang's mother. She is the one who pushed Seo-jin to bring Ye-seo to the top in order to have a third generation doctor in the family.

==== Hwang family ====
- Choi Won-young as Hwang Chi-young

Soo-im's husband. A talented neurosurgeon at Joonam University Hospital,who was recruited by the hospital director for his good surgical skills and passion towards his work. Rival of Joon-sang. He grew up at an orphanage owned by Soo-im's parents and has a good heart. After Woo-joo's birth mother passed away, he married Soo-im.

- Kang Chan-hee as Hwang Woo-joo

Soo-im's stepson whom she treats as her own son. He likes Hye-na, and is liked by Ye-seo. A kind student who always helps others that have difficulties.

==== Cha family ====
- Kim Byung-chul as Cha Min-hyuk

Seung-hye's husband. A law school professor and former prosecutor, who holds a PhD from Seoul National University. He comes from a low-income family unlike the other husbands; that's his weakness. A cold but ambitious person, who is strict with his children and holds very high expectations of them, especially academically. At the end,his strict world vision changes due to a family issue and becomes a warm-hearted person.

- Park Yoo-na as Cha Se-ri

Seung-hye's daughter. She is a marketing director of a nightclub. She lied about being a Harvard University student and got caught by her parents.

- Kim Dong-hee as Cha Seo-joon

Seung-hye's elder son; a twin of Ki-joon. A classmate of Woo-joo. Even though he is calmer than his younger twin, he strongly dislikes his father's method of teaching and studying.

- Jo Byeong-kyu as Cha Ki-joon

Seung-hye's younger son; a twin of Seo-joon. He likes to play tricks on Ye-seo. He strongly dislikes his father's method of teaching and studying.

- Kim Joo-ryoung as Noh Seon-hye

Seung-hye's elder sister. She lives in New York, taking care of her niece Se-ri who moved to the United States.

==== Woo family ====
- Jo Jae-yoon as Woo Yang-woo

Jin-hee's husband. An orthopaedics surgeon. He is very obedient to Kang Joon-sang, but he also admires Hwang Chi-young.

- Yoo Jin-woo as Woo Soo-han

Jin-hee's son. He is not interested in studying, but still tries his best under huge academic pressure. Soo-han has a crush on Ye-bin.

==== People around Joo-young ====
- Lee Hyun-jin as Jo Tae-jun

Joo-young's secretary.

- Jo Mi-nyeo as Kay / Katherine

Kim Joo-young's daughter. As a result of a car accident that caused her serious brain damage, she became mentally ill. Implied to have savant syndrome.

==== Others ====
- Kim Bo-ra as Kim Hye-na

Sinah Secondary School student. Later is revealed that she's the daughter of Kang Joon-sang. She is treated as an enemy by Ye-seo and is also a tragic character who needs to survive in a cruel and selfish world. She has no feelings toward Hwang Woo-joo.

- Woo Ji-hyun as Jeon Jin-man

Neurosurgery resident

- Song Min-hyung as Choi In-ho

Medical superintendent of Joonam University Hospital.

- Lee Yeon-soo as Kim Eun-hye

Hye-na's mother. She used to be Joon-sang's girlfriend, but they broke up after his mother's rejection.

- Yoo Yeon as Laura Jung

==== Park family ====
- Kim Jung-nan as Lee Myung-joo

A former resident of SKY Castle, she committed suicide after her son ran away to his secret girlfriend.

- Song Geon-hee as Park Young-jae

Myung-joo's son. After his mother's death, he wants to reconcile with his father, Park Soo-chang.

- Yu Seong-ju as Park Soo-chang

Myung-joo's husband and Young-jae's father, formerly working at Joonam University Hospital. At first, he is harsh and abusive towards Young-jae, but after his wife's death he wants to reconcile with his son.

- Lee Yun-seol as Lee Ga-eul

Young-jae's girlfriend. She is 6 years older than him and was hired as a housekeeper by Myung-joo, coming from a low-class family. Myung-joo disapproved of her status and her relationship with Young-jae.

- Kwon Hwa-woon as Lee Choong-sun
- Shin Cheol-jin an elder at Soo-chang's cabin.

Like Soo-chang, he also has a son that committed suicide after being admitted to SNU with the aid of Kim Joo-young.

==== Special appearance ====
- Im Chan-mi (Note: Credited as Kim Chan-mi) as herself (ep. 3–4)

== Episodes ==
No.	Title	Directed by	Written by	Original release date
1	"Episode 1"	Jo Hyun-tak	Yoo Hyun-mi	23 November 2018
Han Seo-jin holds a party to congratulate Yeong-jae's acceptance to SNU medical school and invites everyone within Sky Castle, but it is only a guise to obtain access to the portfolio that grants her the admission. Unsuccessful, she tries again by inviting Myeong-ju, Yeong-jae's mother, and the others for tea, but again fails. Cha Min-hyeok reveals that he also wrote Yeong-jae's essay and asks his wife, No Seung-hye for the rest of the secret. The next morning, she and Seo-jin attempt to once again bribe Myeong-ju. She gives Seo-jin an envelope containing a VVIP invitation from their bank to see the coordinator for their children's college admission exam; but Seung-hye is also there using an invitation from her husband. Kim Ju-yeong, who also used to be Yeong-jae's coordinator, agrees to assist Seo-jin's daughter, Ye-seo, while Seung-hye comes home empty handed. Seo-jin begs her mother-in-law Madame Yun, who has always wanted Ye-seo to enter medical school, to help with funding the tutoring. Ju-yeong calls Seo-jin to have her call Hwang Woo-joo's parents as a competitor to her daughter, but her number is blocked. At their monthly book club, Ye-seo reads aloud her recension of the book "The Selfish Gene". Contrary to the actual content however, she writes that she inherited the gene from her parents and aspires to be the best in everything and be selfish. Outside that night, Myeong-ju commits suicide. Meanwhile, Jung-sang is appointed the director of the new Spine and Joint Center by hospital superintendent Park Su-chang.
2	"Episode 2"	Jo Hyun-tak	Yoo Hyun-mi	24 November 2018
After the death of Myeong-ju, the Park family moves out of Sky Castle and Su-chang resigns. Seo-jin suspects she didn't actually go for the cruise vacation gifted by her husband to celebrate Yeong-jae's admission to SNU. Su-chang reveals to Jun-sang the rift between Yeong-jae and his parents that cost his wife's life. Woo-joo and his parents move in to the Park family's former residence after his father, Hwang Chi-yeong is appointed as the new neurosurgeon at the hospital. This causes Ju-sang to be jealous of him. The mother, Su-im meets Seo-jin, whom she remembers as Kwak Mi-hyang from the orphanage her foster parents owned, an identity that she denies. Su-im is however disliked by the rest of the mothers for her lower-class attitude, with the exception of Seung-hye. Shocked to hear that Su-im's son has similar accomplishments to her daughter, Seo-jin storms out from their lunch meeting by the Hwang family. She retrieves her tablet left behind there and comes across Yeong-jae's diaries, which his mother had read in remorse on the night of her suicide. He wrote about his unhappy life while fulfilling his parents' dreams of entering medical school. He ran away with his lover Lee Ga-eul, the family housekeeper and of a lower class – an act that was the last straw for Myeong-ju. Terrified by the story, Seo-jin runs to see Ju-yeong and slaps her after their cars crash into each other.
3	"Episode 3"	Jo Hyun-tak	Yoo Hyun-mi	30 November 2018
Fearing that Ye-seo would end up like Yeong-jae, Seo-jin accuses Ju-yeong of an incitement for the murder of Myeong-ju due to her hard-pressing study regime that she had adopted for him and asks for a refund, although she says she was just following the demand of his late mother and has severed her relationships with her past clients. She then tells her secretary Jo to enroll Ye-seo to SNU regardless of her actual desire. Seo-jin tries to look for a substitute tutor by pairing her up with her classmates, but their mothers do not like Ye-seo. Su-im finally finds out from Ye-seo and Seung-hye about the troubled past of her residence. Failing to obtain a coordinator, Seung-hye tries to dig for information from Soo-im about her stepson's success but finds nothing more than doing things from his perspective and that she too is struggling as a foster mom. Soo-im is also surprised by the choice of books they read at the book club but joins anyway with her son. Initially resistant to them joining, Jin-hi agrees after realizing Ye-seo has always been dominating the discussion. Su-im criticizes the book club for only allowing a uniform opinion and its book selection as being too mature for middle school children, which invokes Min-hyeok to ask for a vote on whether to continue or disband the book club. Su-im advises Seo-jin to teach Ye-seo to behave well with strangers but is met with resistance from her. At the hospital, Chi-yeong is instead asked by the new superintendent Choi In-ho to perform an operation supposedly done by Jun-sang on Kim Chan-mi.
4	"Episode 4"	Jo Hyun-tak	Yoo Hyun-mi	1 December 2018
Seo-jin finally admits to Su-im that she is Kwak Min-hyang, the daughter of a butcher, but begs her to conceal her old identity from her children and everyone else. She finally realizes that the trouble with Yeong-jae that costs Myeong-ju her life is mainly because of his relationship with Ga-eul, so she reemploys Ju-yeong. Seo-jin is on her knees to apologize for her behavior and Ju-yeong agrees to return assisting Ye-seo after declining the Cha family. Meanwhile, with the only 'continue' votes coming from Seo-jin, Jin-hee, Min-hyeok and Ye-seo, their book club is thus disbanded. Min-hyeok is furious because Seo-jun is unable to answer a practice question from the college admissions exam in time, while his wife hears the commotion in agony. She then confronts him about the inception of the book club as a guise to make him of a similar level to other families of doctors, while he is only the son of a laundryman. Chi-yeong is reprimanded by In-ho for failing to supervise the intern who cut Kim Chan-mi's hair for what is supposed to be an orthopedic surgery, and Chi-yeong goes to the public to apologize on behalf of his intern.
5	"Episode 5"	Jo Hyun-tak	Yoo Hyun-mi	7 December 2018
Yeong-jae breaks into Ju-yeong's office to accuse her of killing his mother, but hurts Seo-jin, who tries to stop him. Su-im is disturbed by evening cram school students, including Ye-bin and Su-han, whom she witnesses stealing snacks from a minimart, so she handles them herself. But Seo-jin, who actually bribes the cashier, attacks her. Su-han lies to her mother about coming 10 minutes late to class after the break in order to wait for Su-im, which leads to Seo-jin and Jin-hee conspiring to prevent their children from meeting her. After failing to convince Ju-yeong to assist his children, Min-hyeok determines to set up a training regime himself. After hearing some advice from Su-im, Seung-hye decides to take matters into her own hands by conspiring with her sons to corner him and renovating their study room. In retaliation, her husband cuts her credit cards and demands her to restore the study room as it was. In school, Hye-na confronts their history teacher for giving them online lectures and Ye-seo for doing math homework during the history lesson, while Woo-joo is in love with her. At the hospital, Chi-yeong is praised for calming a raging Yeong-jae and giving the interns a holiday, and thus is appointed head of the orthopedic department, which disturb Joon-sang and Yang-woo. Kim Eun-hye, Hye-na's mother and Jun-sang's ex-girlfriend, calls Jun-sang to ask for help.
6	"Episode 6"	Jo Hyun-tak	Yoo Hyun-mi	8 December 2018
Seung-hye makes a bet with Min-hyeok on which studying method is better for their sons to justify her action of renovating the study room using their midterm tests. When Gi-jun and Seo-jun receive better scores on their midterms, he relents and leaves the study room as it is. Jin-hi relinquishes her ambition of her son, Su-han becoming a doctor. Madam Yun intervenes to make Jun-sang head of the new health center at the hospital, despite caught by one of his patients, whose operation is botched. Ye-bin finds out how she steals food from the minimart yet is never caught by the cashier. After Ye-seo's intimidation, Ye-bin distances herself from her mother and Ye-seo by running away with her mother's computer tablet and some of her mother's bags and jewelry, but Su-im finds her and takes her to her home. When Ye-bin opens the tablet to play games, she sees instead Yeong-jae's diaries and reads it together with Su-im. At a lunch meeting, Seo-jin finds out from Ju-yeong that Ye-seo likes Woo-joo, and Ju-yeong is greeted by someone named Laura Jung, who remembers her as Jennifer who used to live in Fairfax, Virginia and has a daughter named Kay.
7	"Episode 7"	Jo Hyun-tak	Yoo Hyun-mi	14 December 2018
Su-im finds out about Yeong-jae and after being picked up by Seo-jin, admits to her about her fear of suffering like him. Seo-jin tells her a story of him having a rage attack before his high school entrance exam, while Su-im tries to dig more information about him by taking Ye-bin and Su-han out for dinner. Park Su-chang comes back to Sky Castle to look for Ju-yeong, who happens to be with Seo-jin. Knowing about how Myeong-ju died, Su-im and Jin-hi put a suspicion on Ju-yeong as the culprit, but Seo-jin, overhearing it, shuts them up. At an evaluation for Ye-seo's performance, Ju-yeong catches a slight mistake on her English exam, resulting in her having only a slight edge over Hye-na. Yang-woo, having a backpain that requires a surgery, wishes to be operated by his supervisor Jun-sang out of loyalty, but trusts Chi-yeong instead. This causes a rift between Seo-jin and Jin-hi. At Shin A High School, Hye-na and Ye-seo apply to be the candidates for student council leader. Both hunt Woo-joo as their running mate but he chooses the former. Hye-na is revealed to be paid by Do-hoon's mother for her tuition fees in exchange for tutoring him.
8	"Episode 8"	Jo Hyun-tak	Yoo Hyun-mi	15 December 2018
Ju-yeong is kidnapped by Su-chang while Seo-jin follows them. He threatens to shoot her as a revenge for Yeong-jae's runaway, but she blames him for not taking care of Yeong-jae well. He spares her life and begs her not to do what she did with Yeong-jae to her future clients. Knowing that Ye-seo has a slim chance of winning the student council election, she makes Seo-jin blackmail Do-hoon's mother to derail Hye-na's campaign so that she resigns, while Su-im wants to meet Ju-yeong to continue her investigation of Yeong-jae. Meanwhile, Ye-seo wants Seo-jun to be her running mate and ultimately wins the election uncontested. Yang-woo unsuccessfully tries to restore his trust with Jun-sang by flattering him after his wife's fight with Seo-jin. After hearing from Su-chang, Jun-sang tells her not to employ Ju-yeong again and asks his mother to be on his side, but he doesn't know of Yeong-jae's relationship with Ga-eul. While packing up her mother's stuff after her death, Hye-na comes across an old photo of her mother and Jun-sang and uses her phone to call him.
9	"Episode 9"	Jo Hyun-tak	Yoo Hyun-mi	21 December 2018
Seo-jin holds a party to celebrate Ye-seo's win but conspires with Jin-hee to give Su-im a lesson. At the dinner party, Jin-hi deliberately asks her why she does an investigation about Yeong-jae, and she tells the truth about writing a novel about the pressure on students cramming their studies to enter elite colleges which happen at Sky Castle and the expensive resources poor people can't afford to enroll their kids onto there, despite Min-hyeok's threat of suing her for defamation and Jin-hi's threat of starting a petition to stop the publication. While visiting Myeong-ju's grave, she bumps into Ju-yeong and asks why she tells Yeong-jae to seek revenge against his parents. She tells her a story of Myeong-ju allowing her to use the exact method so that he got admitted to SNU and had used the same method too to Yeon-du, whose suicide Soo-im witnessed. Woo-joo takes Hye-na around Sky Castle and meets Ye-bin and Su-han, whom she offers to teach. Unable to get rid of her, Seo-jin calls Ju-yeong for assistance. Her secretary investigates her home and finds Eun-hye's phone. She then demands Seo-jin to allow Hye-na to live with her in order to provide money for her study and encourage competition with Ye-seo. Seung-hye finds out why Seo-jun is paired with Ye-seo for student leader candidacy and finds out from her husband that the deal is in exchange of sample exam questions. Ju-yeong, who has been investigating Su-im, reads a children's book written by her and remembers her daughter, Kay, who had brain damage after a car accident.
10	"Episode 10"	Jo Hyun-tak	Yoo Hyun-mi	22 December 2018
Hye-na tries to settle with Seo-jin to live at her house, but she refuses and only provides her money. When Ju-yeong finds out, she sits Ye-seo in her meditation room and suggests her to write her exam with doubt instead of confidence to beat Hye-na in the exam. Su-im is tried and threatened to stop writing her book by the residents of Sky Castle. There, she accidentally spills the tea about the real identity of Seo-jin as Kwak Min-hyang, whose father sells oxblood and offal. To the disbelief of everyone, she also admits her lies about being the daughter of a Sydney banker and a graduate of the University of Sydney. Jun-sang, who shove the identity to her, blames her for causing the commotion in the first place during the dinner party that led up to the incident. She then tells the truth to a devastated Ye-seo that she came from a poor and abusive family, yet obtained a scholarship from college, so that she doesn't suffer from the same fate as her. At the hospital, Yang-woo's operation is successful, while superintendent Cha In-ho unsuccessfully lobbies Chi-yeong to pitch him to Kim Hyeok-jae for a seat in the Ministry of Health. Jun-sang invites Min-hyeok to dinner to lobby Hyeok-jae, his classmate, to pick him as the Director of Planning at the hospital. Su-im apologizes to Seo-jin, but she still demands her to stop writing the book, especially if the story focuses on Yeong-jae's family. On the final exam, Ye-seo is upset for not receiving a perfect score while Hye-na aces all the exams. Min-hyeok scolds Ki-joon and Seo-joon for not being at the top rank of the bunch, in which they reason that they shared the mock exam questions to their classmates. Ju-yeong reveals to Seo-jin that Ye-seo is brittle and pushes for Hye-na to move into her house so that she can focus solely on her grades, Seo-jin reluctantly agrees.
11	"Episode 11"	Jo Hyun-tak	Yoo Hyun-mi	28 December 2018
Hye-na moves into the Kang family, with Ye-bin waiting in excitement as she looks forward to being tutored, and Ye-seo dejected as Hye-na is rank two on the school, just under her. As a result, Ye-seo is continuously distracted from her studies and this pisses her mother, while Ye-bin makes a tremendous progress thanks to Hye-na's tutoring, which makes Su-han jealous. Jin-hi meets Seo-jin to enroll Su-han, but she, still crossed with her being called a liar in public, pulls her hair. At Cha Se-ri's arrival party, she pours maple syrup on her. Hye-na, coming home earlier from the party, breaks into Jun-sang's computer and flipped his family picture down before being caught by Seo-jin. She then breaks into Hye-na's bedroom and finds a picture of Eun-hye with her husband, suspecting Hye-na might actually be her stepchild. Min-hyeok calls Soo-im once again to demand her to stop writing her book, but she does not budge. She meets Ju-yeong to ask for Su-chang's contact to ask him permission to write her novel based on Yeong-jae's story, but travels with her instead to his cabin. He tells them he has always been waiting for his son, who never sees him again since he ran away, and thinks Soo-im's effort to expose the story in her book is useless. She thus temporarily stops writing.
12	"Episode 12"	Jo Hyun-tak	Yoo Hyun-mi	29 December 2018
Hye-na is confirmed to be the biological child of Jun-sang, confirming Seo-jin's suspicion of why she was abnormally excited about moving in. She does not want to spoil the secret for fear of distracting Ye-seo, yet concludes that Hye-na called her husband on the day her mother died in preparation for a vendetta against her. She confronts Hye-na for telling Ye-seo of her father's unrequited love for her late mother, but she challenges her to tell him and says she is returning what was given to her by him. Hye-na requests to be included in the family registry and to be treated equal as her biological children, which Seo-jin says can only take place after Ye-seo's admission to SNU. Su-im coincidentally obtains information about Ju-yeong from Jin-hi and turns her suspicion to Ju-yeong for lying about Yeon-du. Ju-yeong permits her to write her book. She also revisits Su-chang, who tells her that another person staying at his cabin had a son also coached by Ju-yeong, who died after his admission into SNU Medical School and was also told by her to seek revenge when his parents were euphoric of his admission. She reports this to Seo-jin, who refuses to listen. Meanwhile, having enough with his mother, Su-han runs away from home before being found by Chi-yeong and her. Seung-hye discovers from her sister that Se-ri lied about her admission into Harvard and fled to South Korea to avoid a lawsuit by the school. Seo-jin learns during her meeting with Laura Jung & Madam Yoon about Ju-yeong's past life in the USA, who was arrested for murdering her husband by sabotaging his car and framing it as an accident, which also debilitated her daughter.
13	"Episode 13"	Jo Hyun-tak	Yoo Hyun-mi	4 January 2019
Seo-jin, curious of Yeong-jae's life after learning the troubled past of Ju-yeong, arranges a meeting with Su-im. She also has a suspicion on why Ju-yeong suggests moving Hye-na into her home. She confronts her directly about the case, but she tells her that she was cleared of the charges, as they see her daughter, Kay. Realized that her plot is foiled, she plans to bring Ye-seo to the meditation room every day to indoctrinate her. At one of her sessions, she suggests her to consider her mother as a roadblock on her path to success. At home, Hye-na increasingly shows disrespect towards her but has Ye-bin on her side. Seung-hye and her sons are outraged with Se-ri's imposter life but conceals it from Min-hyeok, aware of the harsh consequences she might face. Jin-hi turns her loyalty to the Hwang family after Chi-yeong saved her son, Su-han. In the hospital, Jun-sang is obsessed with generating more money for the hospital to impress his boss on his campaign to be the planning manager, even if it means cutting corners. At a funeral, Kang attempts to impress Hyeok-jae when they sit together using the prompts sent by Min-hyeok, which flops as he can't read Hanja. As he goes home and is made known of Se-ri's imposter life, he laughs knowing that he has an upper hand against Min-hyuk, whom he always loathes. Meanwhile, Yeong-jae arrives in Su-chang's cabin and he invites Su-im. He tells her, Ju-yeong did indoctrinate him that his misery would end when he is accepted into SNU by seeking revenge because his parents threw Ga-eul out. He permits her to write his story for her book. Seo-jin, finding out the story from Su-im, confronts Secretary Jo about Hye-na, before realizing that Ju-yeong's plan all along is to wreak havoc on her family.
14	"Episode 14"	Jo Hyun-tak	Yoo Hyun-mi	5 January 2019
Ju-yeong stands by her reasoning of moving Hye-na into Seo-jin's house, one of which as a way to tame her resentment. Seo-jin asks for a refund, but she keeps watching Ye-seo. Seo-jin gives Ye-seo articles of her imprisonment and wishes to sever all relationships with her, but she considers her to be a roadblock to her success. At dinner, Seo-jin accuses Hye-na of using Ye-bin as her pawn to state that she is her husband's daughter, by asking if she can visit Seonjae Island, where her mom used to live. While fighting with Ye-seo after kissing Woo-joo, Hye-na accidentally breaks the secret. Ye-seo goes increasingly hostile to her parents and warms up to Ju-yeong. Su-im once again seeks Ju-yeong to ask why she lied about not permitting her book by bringing up Yeon-du, in which Ju-yeong's defense is, she is only a tool used by her client's parents to feed their greed on their children. Se-ri opens up to his father, Min-hyeok about why she failed entering Harvard. When she comes home from her runaway, she admits of being tired and failed to live according to her father's expectations but lied to make him happy. Seung-hye saves her as he rages uncontrollably. When they come home, Min-hyeok denies Se-ri as his daughter. Meanwhile, Chi-yeong writes an article that defames Jun-sang and the hospital, hindering In-ho's pursue for public office. On the second semester finals, Ye-seo places first while Hye-na places second. The latter jumps off from a building during Woo-joo's birthday celebration.
15	"Episode 15"	Jo Hyun-tak	Yoo Hyun-mi	11 January 2019
Hye-na's presence at Woo-joo's birthday surprises everyone, especially Jin-hee, who overheard Hye-na threatening Ye-seo to publish their father's identity on the school website. Ju-yeong arranges a meeting with Ye-seo's parents and Madame Yun, but it is interrupted by Hye-na's suicide. Jun-sang orders Chi-yeong to operate the director's grandson, also hanging on his life, while Hye-na is about to be transferred to another hospital but dies on the way. Seo-jin suspects that the culprit could be what happened during breakfast, when Ye-seo implicitly asked her father's reaction of Hye-na being his daughter, with him saying it would be a nuisance. The police rule out Hye-na's death as a suicide. Woo-joo, upset about her death, accuses his father of killing her, based on what he did to his former wife, while Min-hyeok accuses Se-ri of killing Hye-na after a fight broke up between the two at Woo-joo's birthday party. Police suspects Hye-na couldn't have died of suicide and investigates Ye-seo, while Ye-bin says she went into a fight with Se-ri for attacking her personally. Woo-joo gives his phone to the police for the investigation as he says that Hye-na asked him to meet at the balcony. The parents' clashed with each other as they defend each other's kids, but Su-im breaks the fight and Jin-hee says that Ye-seo and Hye-na have been hating each other. Seo-jin asks Jin-hi for help as they reconcile. She tells the story of Jun-sang, who has no idea that that his one-night stand with Eun-hye resulted in Hye-na being born and feels guilty of keeping the secret from him. Se-ri tells Min-hyeok the full story of how she and Hye-na get back together after the fight and asks him to accept who she is now, a nightclub manager. As Ye-seo comes over to Ju-yeong, Seo-jin suspects her daughter might actually be the culprit after she called Ju-yeong that night saying she wanted to kill Hye-na in fear of humiliation. Surprised that Seo-jin knows her trick, Ju-yeong looks for a scapegoat to keep Ye-seo under her watch, who turns out to be Woo-joo.
16	"Episode 16"	Jo Hyun-tak	Yoo Hyun-mi	12 January 2019
Seo-jin agrees to trust Ju-yeong at least one more semester, even if it means the truth of Hye-na's murder will stay concealed. Woo-joo is handcuffed to the police station as he is framed for murdering Hye-na. A dashboard camera shows a figure wearing a red hoodie, which Woo-joo is supposedly wearing at that time, pushed Hye-na to her death. Seo-jin conspires with Jin-hee and Seung-hye, Woo-joo is not a good kid as everyone thinks, especially since Su-im is not her biological mother. Su-im goes back to the crime scene to retrace what she remembers happened that night and found something in the boiler room that she thinks serves as evidence. Upon further questioning by her mother, Woo-joo recalls that Hye-na felt humiliated by Kim Ju-yeong that she is used as a tool for Ye-seo to compete, despite never meeting her. Su-im suspects someone living in Sky Castle might be the culprit and interrogates Jin-hee because she knows she is hiding something. Finding out the answer, she runs to Seo-jin to accuse her and determines to resolve the false arrest herself. While running to Ju-yeong's office, she sees the toy parrot used to hang on Hye-na's bag grabbed by Ye-seo, suggesting that Hye-na met Ju-yeong at one point. A recording found on Hye-na's USB confirms that in her conversation with Ju-yeong, Hye-na wanted Ye-seo to flunk her admission after she sneaked into Ye-seo's bedroom and finds a collection of exam questions, implying that an insider at their school might be Ju-yeong's accomplice. Ye-seo, still in denial that a person she is in love with is arrested, cannot concentrate on her lessons, so Ju-yeong confines her for a week, which distresses Seo-jin. At the funeral, Ye-bin overhears the truth about Hye-na. When his father comes home drunk from golfing, she confronts him using the facts. Meanwhile in protest of his father advising them to use Woo-joo's arrest and Ye-seo's grief as a chance for them to improve their ranking in class, Gi-jun breaks one of his pyramid collections. Before he throws a slap, he and Seo-jun throw him outside as Seung-hye watches.
17	"Episode 17"	Jo Hyun-tak	Yoo Hyun-mi	18 January 2019
Jun-sang is rained with guilt as he suddenly remembers his ex, Eun-hye, and balks at Seo-jin for hiding Hye-na's paternity test. A full recording of Hye-na's conversation shows her threatening Ju-yeong of reporting her for conspiring with an insider in leaking the exam papers for Ye-seo unless she cancels her admission to SNU. Seo-jin finds out herself that Ye-seo's exams are exactly the same with mock questions Ju-yeong prepared for her, concluding that Ju-yeong is indeed involved in Hye-na's death. Su-im, who confronts Ju-yeong directly, also comes up with the same conclusion, but with Seo-jin also involved, despite having no evidence. She and Chi-yeong investigate the guesthouse one more time, this time by interrogating the security guard, one of which is suspicious because someone parked his car abnormally there. Seo-jin confronts Ju-yeong using the recording, but Ju-yeong says she sabotaged her plan by agitating Hye-na and ultimately decided to wipe her off to maintain her perfect record. Seo-jin, however, still lets her watch Ye-seo, after her mother-in-law insists on Ye-seo to enter SNU. Su-im pleas to Seo-jin to help her, but Ye-seo calls her after seeing her mom's rejection, to see Woo-joo. After the visitation, Ye-seo admits she is lying to her about the toy parrot and tells her mother that she too suspects Ju-yeong and wants Woo-joo released, despite being aware of the consequences. Jun-sang, overhearing the conversation, attacks Ju-yeong at her office. Meanwhile, Min-hyeok brings home a giant pyramid replacing the one destroyed by Gi-jun, while Seung-hye goes to a furniture shop with Se-ri, planning for what would be her last resort should she be unable to appease her husband.
18	"Episode 18"	Jo Hyun-tak	Yoo Hyun-mi	19 January 2019
Jun-sang, about to attack Ju-yeong, argues with Seo-jin, knowing that both of them have sacrifices to make regardless of whether Ye-seo succeeds or fails. He leaves for Jeongseon Medical Center to see Su-chang, who advises him to think of the long-term road Ye-seo can take, even if it means not entering SNU medical school. Ye-seo, still sad over Woo-joo's imprisonment, has concerns of flunking her exam, so Seo-jin tells her to bear with Ju-yeong for one more semester. Su-im suspects that Seo-jin has conspired with Ju-yeong to cover up her case, so she meets Laura Jung to investigate the latter's life in the USA. She, then known as Jennifer, had a bad marriage with her husband who wanted to take custody of her daughter, who entered George Washington University at the age of nine. She wanted to kill her husband by sabotaging his car, but also debilitated her daughter, who was with him, in the process. She was cleared of all charges because of her attempt to save Kay but is doomed to feel an eternal guilt. Su-im suspects that Ju-yeong could have murdered Hye-na because of something that Seo-jin hides. Chi-yeong storms into the Kang family house and attacks Jun-sang, who just arrived. He then meets with her mother and wife to consider, if Ye-seo's secret should be covered up or leaked. Haunted with guilt for Hye-na's death and Woo-joo's imprisonment, Jun-sang detests how his mother 'grooms' him according to what she has always wanted and considers resigning from the hospital and leaking the exam paper scandal, even if it means Ye-seo will be expelled and unable to enroll in SNU medical school. Ye-seo grows increasingly hostile for not scoring perfectly on her exams, so Seo-jin once again sees Ju-yeong for the real exam papers. Meanwhile, Seung-hye files a divorce with Min-hyeok and take their children and most of the furniture with her, except his custom-made pyramid.
19	"Episode 19"	Jo Hyun-tak	Yoo Hyun-mi	26 January 2019
Seo-jin correctly guesses the insider who worked with Ju-yeong for Ye-seo's exam papers, who is Mr. Oh, the principal's nephew and history teacher. She has angst of whether to follow Madame Yoon, who wishes Ye-seo to enter SNU whatever it takes, or Jun-sang, who wishes to put an end to Ye-seo's dream to be a doctor. Ye-bin has been skipping school and outright says to Seo-jin that she is a devil for aiding Ye-seo just by stealing test papers. With Ye-seo standing on a dead end, Seo-jin ultimately decides to come clean. She and Jun-sang apologizes to Woo-joo's parents and explains the tie-up after he is released. Consequently, Ye-seo's second semester grades on her third level will be zeroed and expelled from Shin-A high school. She decides to forego her dreams of enrolling into SNU, take a GED test and enter college the following year. When Madame Yoon comes to protest, Ye-seo rebukes her. Meanwhile, Secretary Jo admits to Ju-yeong that what she did to Jung-min, Yeong-jae, and Ye-seo will never cover up her shame for not being a prodigy in university and instead cramming Kay to study to become a genius, which she did out of jealousy of her smarter classmate, Song Hee-ju, now a professor at KAIST and awardee of the Fields Medal. Out of guilt, she enters Kay's room to apologize, as she and Mr. Oh are arrested by the police. During a visitation from Seo-jin, Ju-yeong warns her, saying that she is not clean either.
20	"Episode 20"	Jo Hyun-tak	Yoo Hyun-mi	1 February 2019
During a visitation from Seo-jin, Ju-yeong reminds her what brought her to murdering Hye-na too. Hye-na craved acknowledgement and love from Joon-sang, yet was always hindered by Seo-jin, so she looked to Ju-yeong as her last resort. The Kang family plans to leave Sky Castle to clear their names but not before visiting Hye-na's memorial with the whole family to apologize. Another family who now lives in their house visit the mothers to ask for a coordinator for their son, but the rest laughs at the mother. Meanwhile, Woo-joo asks for a timeout from school as Gi-jun leads a protest in class to bid him farewell, while his mother's book about the scandal at Sky Castle is published and Kay is sent to a long-term care facility, where she is taken care of by Ga-eul. Su-han's parents become more lenient to him. In another story, the Cha family gets back together after Min-hyeok agrees to change his attitude while Se-ri pays back some of her settlement money for the lawsuit and intends to save more to open her own nightclub.
21	"Special"	Unknown	Unknown	2 February 2019
A look at behind the scenes of one of Korean cable television's most watched and best acclaimed series, including interviews with casts.

== Production ==
=== Development ===
The series is directed by Joo Hyun-tak, known for his previous television series such as Who are You? (2013), More Than a Maid (2015), and Secret Healer (2016). The script was also penned by Yoon Hyun-mi, who also wrote Home Sweet Home (2013), and Bridal Mask (2012). The drama production is handled by Drama House.

When the series was still in development, its working title was Princess Maker (Korean: 프린세스 메이커; RR: peurinseseu meikeo).

It was extended from 16 to 20 episodes even before it started broadcasting.

=== Casting ===
On July 21, 2018, It was reported that Yum Jung-ah and Oh Na-ra were in discussions to star as lead actors in the series. On August 13, Kim Jung-eun was offered a lead role but later declined. On August 22, Yoon Se-ah also received an offer and was positively considering joining the cast. On August 28, Yum Jung-ah, Lee Tae-ran, Yoon Se-ah, and Oh Na-ra has finally confirmed their participation as the lead actors in the series. In the following days Kim Seo-hyung also confirmed to appear as one of the lead shortly thereafter.

=== Filming ===
Most of the filming took place in a membership resort located in Yongin, Gyeonggi Province and the first script reading of the casts took place in August 2018 at JTBC Building in Sangam-dong, Seoul, South Korea.

== Original soundtrack ==
Sky Castle OST

Soundtrack album by various artists
- Released: 2018
- Genre: Soundtrack
- Languages: Korean; English
- Label: Warner Korea

=== Part 1 ===
Released on November 23, 2018
No.	Title	Lyrics	Music	Artist	Length
1.	"Princess Maker" (프린세스메이커)	MaRiN; Kai	Bae Hyeong-ho; MaRiN	Cheon Dan-bi	3:31
2.	"Princess Maker" (Inst.)		Bae Hyeong-ho; MaRiN		3:31
Total length:					7:02

=== Part 2 ===
All tracks are written by GamDongis and Seo Jae-ha.

Released on November 30, 2018
No.	Title	Artist	Length
1.	"Time Is Always on My Side" (시간은 언제나 나의 편)	Romantic Punch	3:30
2.	"Time Is Always on My Side" (Inst.)		3:30
Total length:			7:00

=== Part 3 ===
Released on December 7, 2018
No.	Title	Lyrics	Music	Artist	Length
1.	"It Has to Be You" (너여야만 해)	About	About; Pch 8um	About	3:36
2.	"It Has to Be You" (Inst.)		About; Pch 8um		3:36
Total length:					7:12

=== Part 4 ===
All tracks are written by Choi Jeong-in.

Released on December 12, 2018
No.	Title	Artist	Length
1.	"We All Lie"	Ha Jin	3:15
2.	"We All Lie" (Inst.)		3:15
Total length:			6:30

=== Part 5 ===
All tracks are written by GamDongis, Seo Jae-ha, and Kim Young-sung.

Released on December 21, 2018
No.	Title	Artist	Length
1.	"Comma" (쉼표)	Wax	4:21
2.	"Comma" (Inst.)		4:21
Total length:			8:42

=== Part 6 ===
All tracks are written by GamDongis, Seo Jae-ha, and Kim Young-sung.

Released on December 28, 2018
No.	Title	Artist	Length
1.	"I Do"	MIII	3:10
2.	"I Do" (Inst.)		3:10
Total length:			6:20

=== Part 7 ===
All tracks are written by Lee Seung-joon and Jo Won-il.

Released on December 28, 2018
No.	Title	Artist	Length
1.	"It's Good as Long as Only I Live" (나만 잘 살면 되지)	Yook Joong-wan	3:06
2.	"It's Good as Long as Only I Live" (Inst.)		3:06
Total length:			6:12

All artists are Kim Tae-sung and Choi Jung-in, except where noted.

Disc 2
No.	Title	Artist(s)	Length
1.	"Agalmoery"		4:32
2.	"Bolero"		1:58
3.	"Butterfly"		1:59
4.	"Endless Night"		2:35
5.	"Kim Jo-young"		4:27
6.	"Tell You the Truth"		4:43
7.	"The Top of One's Desire"		4:28
8.	"What I Want"		3:25
9.	"We All Live (orchestra ver.)"		4:04
10.	"We All Live (slow ver.)"	Ha Jin	2:12
11.	"Whisper of Evil"		3:30

== Reception ==
=== Critical reception ===
The drama series has drawn positive reviews as a dark comedy that casts light on some of the furtive and controversial aspects of Korean society. It has also stimulated explosive responses from viewers due to its relatable storyline over Korea's competitive education system. Culture critic Jung Duk-hyun says the drama has received attention from viewers, because it successfully strikes an uneasy chord while heightening viewers' curiosity over the lengths to which rich elite families obsess over education. He also says "In terms of education, the drama satisfies people's desire to peek into what those closed rich family circles do for their children. But at the same time, viewers feel uneasiness when watching their stories. Those two conflicting emotions, 'wanting to know but feeling uncomfortable' makes for some interesting chemistry in the minds of drama fans and puts it on the must-see drama list." The drama also gained popularity in China, where similar issues over a hyper-competitive education system and the pressure to enter into a prestigious university exist.

==== Inciting murder accusation and leaks ====
The drama ignited a controversy for allegedly "inciting" the murder of psychiatrist Lim Se-won, as it aired a scene in which a patient chases after a doctor with a knife in his hand due to a grievance over his operation results.

Following the broadcast of episode 14 on January 5, several Korean netizens on online communities came up with their own theories about what would happen in the next episode. One netizen's theory was supported by what appeared to be a photo of the drama's cue sheet, and another theory was formed based on the character description in a recruitment notice for a new role in the drama. When episode 15 aired on January 11, these theories proved to be true, making viewers question if the story was leaked.

On January 12, the producers explained that "The story was not leaked. Our viewers came up with many theories. They happened to be correct by chance, which must be why people think they are spoilers."

On January 16, controversy rose again after a netizen uploaded photos of parts of the scripts for episode 17 and 18. The fact that the name "Cha Ki-joon" was left on the script drew much attention, and the photos began to spread on online communities. After an investigation into the rumors, the producers confirmed that the scripts for episodes 17 and 18 (to be aired on January 18 and 19) had been leaked.

The production team was accused of plagiarizing the song "We All Lie" from American musician Bea Miller's song "To the Grave" featuring Mike Stud. However, JTBC denied the accusations.

=== Big data reception ===
In the fourth week of January, SKY Castle secured the number one spot for seven consecutive weeks in the Good Data Corporation's Top 10 Drama TV buzzworthiness. Despite its Friday cancellations, the show achieved a record nine consecutive weeks of increasing topicality since its debut. Four cast members also landed in the Top 10 Drama TV Performer Buzzworthiness: Kim Hye-yoon (third), Kim Seo-hyung (fourth), Yeom Jeong-ah (fifth), and Kim Bo-ra (eighth). Additionally, the series set a new record with 16 cast members in the Top 50.

== Viewership ==
Sky Castle is currently the fourth highest-rated Korean drama in cable television history. It was an unexpected commercial hit, rising from 1% viewership ratings to double-digit viewership ratings percentage, as well as topping the Contents Power Index (CPI) rankings and the TV popularity ranking in South Korea. Besides its popularity in South Korea, the series also gained immense popularity in China.

Sky Castle : South Korea viewers per episode (millions)

Season	Episode number																				Average
Season	1	2	3	4	5	6	7	8	9	10	11	12	13	14	15	16	17	18	19	20	Average
1	N/A	0.956	1.091	1.713	1.664	2.124	1.887	1.887	2.165	2.695	2.298	3.046	3.063	3.951	4.111	4.942	5.152	5.950	6.026	6.508	N/A

Source: Audience measurement performed nationwide by Nielsen Media Research.

Average TV viewership ratings
Ep.	Original broadcast date	Average audience share	
Ep.	Original broadcast date	Nielsen Korea	
Ep.	Original broadcast date	Nationwide	Seoul
1	November 23, 2018	1.727% (NR)	2.900% (NR)
2	November 24, 2018	4.373% (2nd)	4.584% (2nd)
3	November 30, 2018	5.186% (1st)	6.035% (1st)
4	December 1, 2018	7.496% (1st)	8.144% (1st)
5	December 7, 2018	7.487% (1st)	8.623% (1st)
6	December 8, 2018	8.934% (1st)	9.754% (1st)
7	December 14, 2018	8.432% (1st)	9.667% (1st)
8	December 15, 2018	9.539% (1st)	10.471% (1st)
9	December 21, 2018	9.714% (1st)	10.522% (1st)
10	December 22, 2018	11.298% (1st)	13.312% (1st)
11	December 28, 2018	9.585% (1st)	10.296% (1st)
12	December 29, 2018	12.305% (1st)	13.646% (1st)
13	January 4, 2019	13.279% (1st)	14.389% (1st)
14	January 5, 2019	15.780% (1st)	17.254% (1st)
15	January 11, 2019	16.397% (1st)	18.443% (1st)
16	January 12, 2019	19.243% (1st)	21.010% (1st)
17	January 18, 2019	19.923% (1st)	21.927% (1st)
18	January 19, 2019	22.316% (1st)	24.501% (1st)
19	January 26, 2019	23.216% (1st)	24.622% (1st)
20	February 1, 2019	23.779% (1st)	24.357% (1st)
Average		12.500%	13.723%
Special	February 2, 2019	7.319%	7.327%
In the table above, the blue numbers represent the lowest ratings and the red numbers represent the highest ratings.; This drama aired on a cable channel/pay TV which normally has a relatively smaller audience compared to free-to-air TV/public broadcasters (KBS, SBS, MBC and EBS).; No episode aired on January 25 due to the broadcast of a match between South Korea and Qatar in the quarter-finals of the 2019 AFC Asian Cup.

== In popular culture ==
The word SKY is an acronym used to refer to the three most prestigious universities in South Korea: Seoul National University, Korea University, and Yonsei University. The term is widely used in South Korea, both in media broadcast and by the universities themselves.

In South Korea, admission to one of the SKY universities is widely considered as determining one's career and social status. Many of the country's most influential politicians, lawyers, physicians, engineers, journalists, professors, and bureaucrats have graduated from one of the SKY universities.

== Accolades ==
Name of the award ceremony, year presented, category, nominee of the award, and the result of the nomination
Award ceremony	Year	Category	Nominee	Result	Ref.
Asian Television Awards	2019	Best Drama Series	Sky Castle	Won	
Asian Television Awards	2019	Best Supporting Actress	Kim Seo-hyung	Nominated	
Baeksang Arts Awards	2019	Grand Prize – Television	Sky Castle	Nominated	
Baeksang Arts Awards	2019	Grand Prize – Television	Yum Jung-ah	Nominated	
Baeksang Arts Awards	2019	Best Drama	Sky Castle	Nominated	
Baeksang Arts Awards	2019	Best Director – Television	Jo Hyun-tak	Won	
Baeksang Arts Awards	2019	Best Actress – Television	Kim Seo-hyung	Nominated	
Baeksang Arts Awards	2019	Best Actress – Television	Yum Jung-ah	Won	
Baeksang Arts Awards	2019	Best Supporting Actor – Television	Kim Byung-chul	Won	
Baeksang Arts Awards	2019	Best Supporting Actress – Television	Yoon Se-ah	Nominated	
Baeksang Arts Awards	2019	Best New Actress – Television	Kim Hye-yoon	Won	
Baeksang Arts Awards	2019	Best Screenplay – Television	Yoo Hyun-mi	Nominated	
Baeksang Arts Awards	2019	Technical Award (Filming)	Oh Jae-ho	Nominated	
Korea Drama Awards	2019	Grand Prize (Daesang)	Yum Jung-ah	Nominated	
Korea Drama Awards	2019	Best Drama	Sky Castle	Won	
Korea Drama Awards	2019	Best Screenplay	Yoo Hyun-mi	Nominated	
Korea Drama Awards	2019	Best Original Soundtrack	"We All Lie" by Ha Jin	Won	
Korea Drama Awards	2019	Hot China Star Award	Kim Seo-hyung	Won	
Korea Drama Awards	2019	Popular Character Award (Female)	Kim Bo-ra	Won	
Korean Culture and Entertainment Awards	2019	Excellence Award, Actress in a Drama	Kim Hye-yoon	Won	
MAMA Awards	2019	Best Original Soundtrack	"We All Lie" by Ha Jin	Nominated	
Melon Music Awards	2019	Best Original Soundtrack	"We All Lie" by Ha Jin	Nominated	

== Remake ==
- An American remake of the television series, tentatively titled TriBeCa, was announced to be aired on NBC.
- A Japanese remake of the television series, also titled Sky Castle, was airing on TV Asahi starting July 25, till September 26, 2024.
- The teaser of Thai remake of the television series has been released titled Sky Castle Thailand วิมานอากาศ., and is set to be premiered on ONE31, on 3 August.
