= Gachon University =

University in South Korea

- Other name: GCU
- Motto: 박애, 봉사, 애국
- Motto in English: Philanthropy, Service, Patriotism
- Type: Private
- Endowment: KR ₩10,734,271,035
- Chancellor: Lee, Gil-Ya
- Vice-Chancellor: Choi, Mi-Ri
- Academic staff: 2,458
- Total staff: 2,837
- Students: 27,899
- Undergraduates: 26,216
- Postgraduates: 1,683
- Location: Seongnam, Gyeonggi & Incheon, South Korea; 37.4512°N 127.1292°E
- Campus: 716,627 square metres (177.082 acres); Multiple Sites
- Colours
- Website: www.gachon.ac.kr
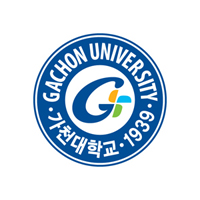

Korean name
- Hangul: 가천대학교
- Hanja: 嘉泉大學校
- RR: Gacheon daehakgyo
- MR: Kach'ŏn taehakkyo

Gachon University (Korean: 가천대학교) is a private university located in South Korea. The current structure of Gachon university is the result of a merger between four existing universities. Gachon University of Medicine and Science and Gachon-gil College merged in 2007, Kyungwon University and Kyungwon College merged in 2007, and Gachon University of Medicine and Science and Kyungwon University merged in 2012. Gachon University has three campuses for undergraduates, the Global Campus (primary) located in Seongnam, satellite campuses on Ganghwa Island and in Yeonsu-dong, and the School of Medicine in Guwol-dong, Namdong-gu, Incheon, South Korea. Gachon University signed a strategic partnership with Hawaii Pacific University to allow students to study abroad.

== Colleges ==
- College of Business
- College of Social Science
- College of Humanities
- College of Law
- College of Engineering
- College of Bio-nano Technology
- College of IT Convergence
- College of Korean Medicine
- College of Art & Physical Education
- Gachon Liberal Arts College
- College of Medical Science
- College of Pharmacy
- College of Nursing
- College of Health Science

== History ==
=== Established ===
In 1982, Kyungwon University, a four-year college, was established with the foundation of Kyungwon Academy established in 1978. In October 1987, Kyungwon University was promoted to a university with 6 colleges. In November of the same year, Kyungwon University established a general graduate school, followed by a graduate school of education and a graduate school of government and a doctoral program.

=== Progress ===
In 1989, the Oriental Medicine Department was newly established at Kyungwon University. In December 1992, the Seoul Oriental Hospital was opened in Songpa-gu, Seoul.

In 1990, the College of Science and Technology was separated into the College of Science (now the College of Natural Science) and the College of Engineering.

In 1992, the College of Art was separated into the College of Art (now Art Design College) and the College of Music.

In 1998, Kyungwon University, which suffered from management difficulties, was taken over by the Gachon Gil Foundation. In 2000, the Gachon Gil Foundation's Chairman Lee Gil-in took office.

In 1998, Kyungwon University was selected as the best university in all areas in the comprehensive evaluation of the university and the best university in the evaluation of educational reform. In 2001, Kyungwon University established the first software university in Korea and the only college of Oriental medicine was established in Gyeonggi Province. With the efforts of internationalization, Kyungwon University has entered into an exchange agreement with many famous universities abroad. (Harvard University, New York State University, Boston University, Duke University, Michigan State University, George Mason University and Tsinghua University in China, Oxford University in England, Ritsumeikan University in Japan Etc)

In 2011, the university signed an agreement with Hawaii Pacific University allowing Gachon students to study at HPU.

== Reputation and rankings ==
Gachon University was ranked 30th among Korean universities and 852nd in the world by Center for World University Rankings for the 2018–2019 period.

== Notable alumni ==
- Byun Jung-soo, actress and model
- Han Jung-soo, actor
- Kim Dong-hee, actor
- Ryu Jin, actor
- Lee Jae-myung, politician, 14th President of South Korea
