= Kim Dong-hee (actor) =

South Korean actor

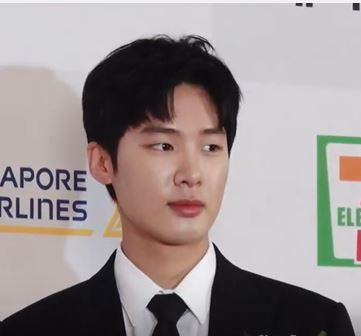
- Kim in July 2019
- Born: June 13, 1999 (age 27); Andong, North Gyeongsang Province, South Korea
- Education: Gachon University
- Occupation: Actor
- Years active: 2018–present
- Agent: Npio Entertainment

Korean name
- Hangul: 김동희
- Hanja: 金東希
- RR: Gim Donghui
- MR: Kim Tonghŭi
- Website: npioe.com

Kim Dong-hee (Korean: 김동희; born June 13, 1999) is a South Korean actor under NPIO Entertainment. He is best known for his acting in hit Korean television series such as Sky Castle (2019), Itaewon Class (2020), A-Teen (2018), A-Teen 2 (2019), and Netflix's original series Extracurricular (2020).

== Early life ==
Kim was born on June 13, 1999, in Andong and is currently studying at Gachon University majoring in Acting Arts.

== Career ==
Kim made his acting debut in 2018, playing as Ha Min-in the teen web series, A-Teen. He also starred in JTBC's hit drama Sky Castle which started airing on November 23, 2018. Kim reprised his role as Ha Min-in the second season of A-Teen which aired in 2019.

In 2020, Kim starred in JTBC's drama Itaewon Class, based on the webtoon of the same name. Kim then landed his first lead role in the Netflix television series Extracurricular where he played the role of a school boy named Oh Ji-soo.

== Personal life ==
=== Bullying allegations and investigation ===
In February 2021, Mr. A claimed to be Kim's elementary school classmate, said, "It was a daily routine for Kim Dong-hee to hit and bully his friends", and has been posted Mr. A presented Kim's graduation photo and SNS photos along with the revelations. Netizen B, who claimed to be Kim's middle school classmate, also claimed, "Kim Dong-hee slapped a classmate who was suffering from a disability with a game that was unfavorable to him or called in a friend to give him a massage." Netizen B also said, "I was strangled by Kim Dong-hee for minor reasons and assaulted several times, and I even received death threats with a sharp weapon."

On December 28, 2021 Kim's legal representative, said in an official statement that the investigation into defamation caused by the spread of false information raised to the author of the allegation of school violence was acquitted. The result of the investigation came out, Kim is innocent.

On January 12, 2022 the Seoul Metropolitan Police has revealed that Kim has admitted to bullying one of his classmates in high-school.

The plaintiff admitted that he bullied defendant 'K' during his 5th year in elementary school using verbal attacks; however, the plaintiff denied 'K's claims that he threatened 'K' with scissors or a box cutter. The plaintiff admitted that he pushed 'K' in the chest with his hands, then went on to kick 'K' in the chest with his foot, but maintained the position that 'K' raised the bullying accusations on online communities with malicious intent by making the incident seem more serious than it was. Based on the following, it is difficult to conclude that 'K's accusations against the plaintiff Kim Dong Hee are false: 1. 'K' was able to provide a detailed and descriptive account of the incident; 2. The principal of the school at the time remembered this incident and submitted a voice recording as evidence; 3. Other witnesses also testified in 'K's favor.

Kim and the company he is under, JYP Entertainment, has yet to release a statement and apology regarding the matter.

On January 13, 2022, Kim revealed his position and posted an apology on the suspicion of school violence. He stated:

Hello. This is Kim Dong-hee.

I would like to state my position on the matter reported yesterday.

When I was in the 5th grade of elementary school, I got into a fight with my classmate in the classroom, and I was disciplined by my teacher. Upon hearing this news, my mother scolded me greatly, and I went to my friend's house with my mother to apologize to my friend and my friend's mother.

After that, I thought that my friend and her mother had forgiven me because I went to the study room with my friend, not only had classes, but also ate dinner with my friend's family and spent a lot of time together without any problems.

I didn't know I was the only one thinking. I couldn't fathom the scars left behind by those people.

After the post was posted last year, I wanted to apologize to my friend right away for this, but I didn't have the courage to apologize for all the things I didn't do as well as the truth and fear that it would cause another misunderstanding. I also want to spend the past year.

It seems that I did not deeply understand the heart of my friend due to my rash judgment and thoughts when I was young. I sincerely apologize for the hurt that friend has inflicted on me, and I want to solve it in the future.

Also, I deeply reflect and apologize to those who were hurt by my immature words and actions as a child.

== Filmography ==
=== Film ===
Year	Title	Role	Ref.
2023	Phantom	Baek-ho	
TBA	The Season of You and Me	Yoo Jae-ha	

=== Television series ===
Year	Title	Role	Ref.
2018–19	Sky Castle	Cha Seo-joon	
2020	Itaewon Class	Jang Geun-soo	

=== Web series ===
Year	Title	Role	Ref.
2018	A-Teen	Ha Min	
2019	A-Teen 2	Ha Min	
2020	Extracurricular	Oh Ji-soo	

== Awards and nominations ==
Year	Award	Category	Nominated work	Result	Ref.
2019	Brand of the Year Awards	Rising Star	—N/a	Won	
