= Pororo: Cyberspace Adventure =

2015 South Korean animated film

- Korean theatrical release poster
- Directed by: Park Young-kyun
- Screenplay by: Kim Eun-sook; Lee Kyung-hee; Park Young-kyun
- Based on: Pororo the Little Penguin by: Iconix Entertainment; SK Broadband; Ocon Studios; EBS; Channel One Russia
- Produced by: Ilho Kim; Kim Hyeon-ho
- Starring: Sun Lee; Lee Mija; Sam Sujung; Hong Soyoung; Jeong Mi-sook; Kim Seo-yeong; Kim Hwanjin; Um Sang-hyun; Hong Bumki
- Edited by: Park Young-kyun; Yoon Changsub
- Music by: Yoo Taejin; Kim Junga; Kim Taejin
- Production companies: Ocon Studios; Woori Investment; Winner Cultural and Media Co., Ltd.
- Distributed by: Next Entertainment World
- Release date: December 10, 2015 (South Korea)
- Running time: 62 minutes
- Country: South Korea
- Language: Korean

Pororo: Cyberspace Adventure (Korean: 뽀로로 극장판 컴퓨터 왕국 대모험) is a 2015 South Korean animated film based on the animated series Pororo the Little Penguin.

== Plot ==
Pororo has a nightmare about losing a video game to Crong and wakes up. Meanwhile, Poby and Harry gets the honey from the bees but gets his nose stung. Eddy invites them over to his house to show them another video game. Loopy trips and spills the drink on Eddy's computer and causes the computer to short circuit and it causes a warp which teleports Pororo and his friends to the video game world where they meet the Prince Chichi who explains he was cursed and the princess kidnapped by the spider King and his henchmen. Pororo must go on a journey to find the cave fairy who will help them get more powerful weapons to defeat the Spider King.

== Korean voice cast ==
- Lee Seon: Pororo
- Lee Mi-ja: Crong
- Ham Su-jung: Eddy
- Hong So-young: Loopy
- Chung Misook: Petty
- Kim Seo-yeong: Harry
- Kim Hwan-jin: Poby
- Um Sang-hyun: Chichi
- Hong Bum-ki: Spider King

== English voice cast ==
- Bill Rogers: Poby / Crong (voice, uncredited)

== Soundtrack ==
Porong Porong Pop Pop Composed and arranged by JUSh Lyrics by JUSh Performed by Lee Jungeun
