= Pororo the Little Penguin =

South Korean children's TV program

- English title card
- Hangul: 뽀롱뽀롱 뽀로로
- RR: Pporongpporong Ppororo
- MR: Pporongpporong Ppororo
- Genre: Children's television series; Comedy; Adventure
- Opening theme: "Always Happy as Can Be" (seasons 1–2); "Hello Friends" (seasons 3–4); "Hello Everyone" (seasons 5–present)
- Ending theme: "We Are the Best of Friends" (season 1); "We Are All Friends" (season 2); "We Are All Good Friends" (seasons 3–present)
- Countries of origin: South Korea; North Korea (seasons 1–2)
- Original language: Korean
- No. of seasons: 9
- No. of episodes: 312 (list of episodes)

Production
- Running time: 5 minutes (seasons 1–3); 11 minutes (seasons 4–present)
- Production companies: Ocon Animation Studios; Iconix Entertainment

Original release
- Network: EBS1; Disney Junior (Korea); Cartoon Network (Korea)
- Release: November 27, 2003 – present

Pororo the Little Penguin (Korean: 뽀롱뽀롱 뽀로로; RR: Pporongpporong Ppororo) is a South Korean 3D computer-animated television series. The series premiered on EBS 1 in South Korea in 2003. It has nine seasons.

The series revolves around the adventures of a little penguin named Pororo, and his friends who live in the snowy village of Porong Porong Forest, who often encounter challenges and learn practical and moral lessons in each episode.

== Production ==
It was created in 2003 by Ocon Studios and Iconix Entertainment Co., Ltd, a company based in Seoul, South Korea. The first two seasons of the show were jointly created between North and South Korea designers as one of the inter-Korean business projects stemming from the North-South Joint Declaration of 2000. Choi Sang-hyun, a designer working at Iconix Entertainment, was tasked with creating a character that represents an animal living in the winter. Choi visited a zoo in order to see those animals and understand how children enjoyed watching them.

Several professional designers joined the project to come up with a character, but Choi's design was chosen as the winner, which then became Pororo. The original Pororo was a blue and white, petite penguin sporting an aviator helmet and goggles, which became popular among children. Pororo's helmet and goggles reflects his dream of flying and adventurous personality. When he was introduced, he was aimed at children aged 4–7.

Pororo has no specific background or cultural coding, so that the series could be popular to children worldwide. Pororo's design inspirations include iconic mascots Mickey Mouse and Hello Kitty. The creators picked the colours blue, pink and white to ensure familiarity for children, as well as representing said colors for boys and girls.

When making episodes, producers focused to details that could be biased to certain cultural codes or give a historical reference, that is sensitive to viewers in certain parts of the world. For example, they ensured that the characters wave rather than bowing or nodding to each other. In the third season, the characters were all given redesigns and outfits that correspond to their personalities.

== Cast ==
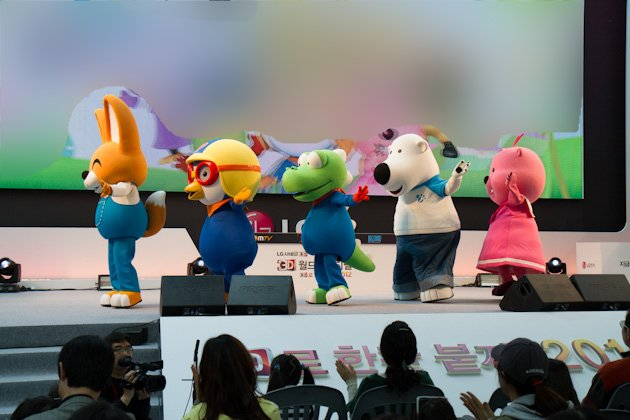
Left to right: Eddy, Pororo, Crong, Poby, and Loopy

English credits

- English translation: Ani100
- English voice director: Anna Paik

=== Korean cast ===
- Lee Seon: Pororo, Monkey 1
- Lee Mi-ja: Crong, Rody (seasons 3–7)
- Kim Hwan-jin: Poby, Dragon, Santa Claus (season 1), Wall Clock, Shark (seasons 3, 5–6)
- Ham Su-jeong: Eddy, Popo
- Hong So-young: Loopy, Nyao, Monkey 2
- Koo Ja-hyeong: Narrator, Tong-tongi, Yeti, Whale (season 1, New 1), Santa Claus (New 1), Robot Cook, Dinosaur Robot
- Jeong Mi-sook: Petty
- Kim Seo-yeong: Harry, Monkey 3, Aliens
- Um Sang-hyun: Shark (seasons 4, 7), Santa Claus (season 4), Tu-tu's Creator (season 4), King Pullala
- Jang Eun-sook: Tutu, Butterfly 1
- Jeong Sun-hye: Butterfly 2
- Lee So-yeong: Jay
- Jeong Yeong-woong: Fuzzy Wuzzy
- Kim Eun-ah: Rody (season 8)
- Nam Do-hyeong: Singing King Robot

=== English cast ===
==== Season 1 ====
- Anna Paik: Pororo
- Tunde Skovran: Crong
- Lisa Kelley: Loopy
- Kristen Myung-hee Cho: Eddy
- Brandon Yu: Poby
- James Bondy: Narrator

==== Season 2 ====
- Samia Mounts: Pororo, Viruses
- Bommie Han: Eddy, Petty, Harry, The Fairy, Good Crong and Bad Crong
- Andrea Libman: Hannah Grace: Loopy
- Tunde Skovran: Crong
- Robert William Gardiner: Poby
- Josh Schwartzentruber: Robots, Dragon
- Nancy Kim: Aliens
- Dean Wendt: Narrator

==== Season 3 ====
- Bommie Han: Pororo, Nyao
- Tunde Skovran: Crong
- John Choi: Poby
- Erica Lee: Eddy
- Anna Paik & Samantha Kim Daniel: Loopy
- Samantha Kim Daniel: Shannon Chan-Kent: Petty
- Jenny Cho: Harry
- John Lee: Tong-Tong
- Adam Lofbomm: Rody
- James Bondy: Narrator, Wall Clock
- Caelyn Shin: Popo, Pipi

==== Season 4 ====
- Bommie Han: Pororo, Summer Island Monkey
- Tünde Skovrán: Crong
- Samantha Kim Daniel: Loopy (most episodes), Petty, Butterflies
- Dana Gaier: Loopy (some episodes)
- Erica Lee: Eddy, Summer Island Monkey
- John Choi: Poby
- Jenny Hyobin Cho: Harry
- Anna Paik: Rody, Summer Island Monkey
- John Lee: Tong-Tong, Spider
- Caelyn Shin: Tu-Tu
- Greg Irwin: Narrator

==== Season 5 ====
- Monique Dami Lee: Pororo
- Lee Mi-ja: Crong
- Kristen Myung Hee Cho: Eddy
- John Choi: Poby, Narrator
- Samantha Kimberly Daniel: Petty, Rody
- John Lee: Tong-tong
- Caelyn Shin: Loopy, Tu-tu
- Jenny Hyobin Cho: Harry

==== Season 6 ====
- Bommie Han: Pororo, Monkey 1
- Lee Mi-ja: Crong
- Anna Desmarais: Eddy, Petty, Monkey 3
- Nancy Kim: Harry
- Anna Paik: Loopy, Tutu, Monkey 2
- Matthew Anipen: Poby, Narrator, Wall Clock
- Josh Schwartzentruber: Rody, Yeti, Fuzzy Wuzzy
- John Lee: Tong-tong

== Media ==
=== Television series ===
- Season 1: 52 x 7' (2003–2004)
- Season 2: 52 x 7' (2005–2006)
- Season 3: 52 x 7' (2009)
- Season 4: 26 x 11' (2012)
- Season 5: 26 x 11' (2014)
- Season 6: 26 x 11' (2016)
- Season 1 (remastered): 52 x 7' (2017)
- Season 7: 26 x 11' (2020–2021)
- Season 8: 26 x 11' (2023)
- Season 9: 26 × 11' (2025–2026)

=== Films and bonuses ===
- Pororo: to the Cookie Castle (2004)
- Pororo and Friends: Dance with La La (2011)
- Pororo Goes to Korea (2012)
- Pororo: The Racing Adventure (2013)
- Pororo: Snow Fairy Adventure (2014)
- Pororo: Cyberspace Adventure (2015)
- Pororo, Dinosaur Island Adventure (2017)
- Pororo, Treasure Island Adventure (2019)
- Pororo, Dragon Castle Adventure (2022)
- Pororo and Friends: Virus Busters (2022)
- Pororo, Dinosaur Castle Adventure (2023)
- Pororo, Popstar Adventure (2023)
- Pororo and Friends: Cyberspace Island Adventure (2024)
- Pororo, Underwater Adventure (2025)
- Pororo and Friends: Curse Love Adventure (2025)
- Pororo: Sweet Castle Adventure (2025)

=== Others ===
==== Spin-offs ====
- Pororo Sing-a-Long: 14 x 3' (2006)
- Eddy the Clever Fox: Season 2: 26 x 5' (2010–2013)
- Loopy, the Cooking Princess: 6 x 5' (2012)
- Pororo's English Show: 13 x 5' (2012–2013)
- Pororo in My Pocket: Season 1: 10 x 5 (2017)
- Pororo Sing Along S8: 13 x 5' (2023)

==== Shorts ====
- Netflix New Year's Eve Countdown 2018 (2017)

== Reception and legacy ==
Initially, Pororo was created solely for entertainment. Later, parents suggested to Choi Jung-il of Iconix Entertainment that new episodes with educational value be included. Producers have received many requests, ranging from what the characters should eat and how to play in episodes to what they can do for society. By 2018, Pororo had been exported to over 140 countries and widely recognizable across Asia. In one survey done by the Korea Content Export Information System in 2006, Pororo ranked second in character brand worth, only behind Hello Kitty and ahead of Winnie the Pooh and Pucca. Due to Pororo's popularity, one of its nicknames has become the "children's president."

Korean Air also provides Pororo-related merchandise for children including a doodle book, a colouring book and a plush toy of the character. In 2015, Pororo was chosen as the mascot for mass transportation in Seoul.

In the summer of 2016, a Pororo Lounge opened at Seoul COEX Mall featuring rides and a parade of Pororo characters.

The immense popularity of Pororo is part of a larger trend of the growing character industry in Korea. Characters such as Pucca, Tayo the Little Bus, and Kakao Friends are all widely popular, driving ratings and merchandise sales. In one 2019 study done by the Korea Creative Content Agency, the Korean character industry was expected to reach $11.9 billion in total sales with exports growing along with it. Pororo contributes to a large portion of these figures, particularly leading sales among young children.

== Awards and nominations ==
In 2007, Pororo received numerous awards from the South Korean government, including the award by the Ministry of Culture and Tourism. In 2010, Pororo got the president's award for Best Animated Characters. In 2014, Pororo got the award for Creative Brands.
