= Hero Circle =

South Korean animated series

- Genre: Comedy; Adventure
- Created by: Lee Ho-jin (이호진); Han Soo-yeon (한수연); Ahn So-jin (안소진); Antony Gusscott
- Written by: Lee Ho-jin (이호진); Han Soo-yeon (한수연)
- Directed by: Han Soo-yeon (한수연); Jeon Kyeong-jin (전경진)
- Theme music composer: Kim Jeong-ah (김정아); Yoon Joo-hyun (윤주현)
- Opening theme: "Hero Circle" by Lee Ho-jin (이호진), Han Soo-yeon (한수연) and Jang Ye-na (장예나)
- Ending theme: "Dot Feeling" by Lee Ho-jin (이호진), Han Soo-yeon (한수연) and Lee Il-song (장예나)
- Composers: Kim Jeong-ah (김정아); Park Ji-hyun (박지현); Yoon Joo-hyun (윤주현); Choi Chang-guk (최창국)
- Country of origin: South Korea
- Original language: Korean
- No. of seasons: 2
- No. of episodes: 52

Production
- Executive producers: Ahn So-jin (안소진); Antony Gusscott
- Producers: Lee Min-soo (이민수); Lee Ho-jin (이호진)
- Running time: 11 min.
- Production companies: Studio TNT studio NODE

Original release
- Network: EBS
- Release: June 29, 2020 – September 21, 2022

Hero Circle (Korean: 히어로 써클) is a Korean animated series produced by Studio TNT and the Educational Broadcasting System. The series aired on EBS1 every Monday and Tuesday at 5:45 pm, beginning on June 29, 2020. It aired on Tooniverse every Wednesday at 6 pm, starting on July 29, 2020. Season 2 was first broadcast on June 29, 2022, airing every Wednesday at 7 pm, and later at 5:30 pm.

== Plot ==
The series is set at a high school in a futuristic city called Popo School (named Cityside Academy in the English dub), following the misadventures of a group of five kids with superpowers called the "Hero Circle". They include Teo, the mischievous leader of the club who has telekinesis; Vincent, a timid vampire who can transform into a bat; Sena, a cynical and competitive girl who can run at the speed of light; Lucky, a cheerful angel; and Dino, a scientist who transforms into a dinosaur when he is angry.

Season 1 shows incidents that occur between supporting characters in various clubs at the school, with other students coming to the Hero Circle for help. Season 2 expands the world view, with episodes in which the Hero Circle competes in sports competitions with a rival school named Caesar School, takes a time machine to the dinosaur era, and confronts real villains, though the formula of season 1 is still kept.

== Characters ==
=== Main characters ===
- Teo (태오; Taeo) (voiced by Cho Hyun-jung) is the mischievous, self-appointed leader of the Hero Circle. He can freely move light objects using telekinesis. Because he is always motivated, he expands his work and gets criticized by his friends, but he is not discouraged and is always full of confidence.
- Sena (세나; Sena) (voiced by Yeo Min-jeong) is a blue-haired girl and a member of the Hero Circle. She is a competitive person with a burning desire to win when her pride is at stake. She uses her ability to move at the speed of light and excellent athletic skills to help others. She is very interested in social networking services, spending most of her time on her cell phone.
- Vincent (빈센트; Binsenteu) (voiced by Yang Jeong-hwa) is a timid and cowardly vampire and a member of the Hero Circle. He has the ability of immortality, but does not want to fight anyone. Unlike ordinary vampires, he is a non-vampire and a pacifist who gets along with humans. He can also transform into a little bat. Marvin was originally planned to be a main character with the ability to become invisible, but was later replaced with Vincent, who inherits Marvin's timid personality.
- Lucky (럭키; Leogki) (voiced by Jeon Hae-ri) is a little angel, and a member of the Hero Circle, who is always happy and full of laughter. She remains cheerful and positive regardless of the situation or events occurring. She does whatever she wants, which sometimes leads to her getting into trouble. Whenever she is in danger, her omnipotent father from Heaven, God, appears to help her. However, Lucky herself does not know this fact. She likes fluffy things.
- Dino (디노; Dino) (voiced by Kim Eun-ah) is a cynical genius scientist and a member of the Hero Circle. He has great intelligence, excels in school, and often creates inventions. He is usually calm, but when he gets angry, he transforms into a giant dinosaur. According to early concepts, he accidentally gained this ability while trying to develop a height-growth potion.

=== Science Circle ===
- Teslee (테슬리; Teseulli) (voiced by Jeon Tae-yeol) is the leader of the Science Circle. He always loses to Dino in exam scores and is in a perennial Kong-line (콩라인; Konglain), coming in 2nd place.
- Ed and Ned (에드&네드; Edeu wa Nedeu) (voiced by Kim Myeong-jun and Um Sang-hyun) are members of the Science Circle.

=== Garden Circle ===
- Debbie (데비; Debi) (voiced by Jang Ye-na) is the leader of the Garden Circle, who resembles Anne Shirley. She catches students who ruin or invade the club and forces them to work in the garden, using them as slaves. Debbie was originally planned to be a plant-themed character and a primary antagonist, but was changed into a recurring side character.

=== Robot Circle ===
- Black, Red and Blue (블랙, 레드, 블루; Beullaeg, Ledeu, Beullu) (voiced by Cheon Ji-seon (Black), Kim Eun-ah (Red; first voice), Jeon Hae-ri (Red; second voice) and Lee Sang-jun (Blue)) are members of the Robot Circle, with Red as the leader.
- Kane (케인; Kein) (voiced by Um Sang-hyun) is a member of the Robot Circle. He is said to have previously participated in a track and field competition with Caesar School, but lost and transferred to the school. He faces Teo, Sena and Vincent alone, using various fouls and gaining the upper-hand with his flying abilities, but is defeated by Sena. He quits, effectively giving up on track and field. However, he is scouted by the Robot Circle, who was watching the game, and he joins the club in a green position.

=== Manga Circle ===
- Bonnie (보니; Boni) (voiced by Kim Eun-ah) is the daughter of a vampire hunter and the leader of the Manga Circle. She has a fear of bats. In season 2, she has a crush on Vlad, Vincent's cousin, drawing a manga about him and herself, although she denies it.
- Mako and Yuko (마코&유코; Mako wa Yuko) (voiced by Cheon Ji-seon) are Japanese twin sisters and members of the Manga Circle. Mako wears square glasses, while Yuko wears round glasses. They use honorifics for Bonnie, the club's leader, and have a good relationship with her. They are shown to like heavy metal, as they are seen waving cheering sticks during band performances.

=== Band Circle ===
- Marvin (마빈; Mabin) (voiced by Kim Myeong-jun) is the lead vocalist and guitarist of the Band Circle. He was originally planned as a main character in the Hero Circle, with the ability to turn invisible. Despite being in a band, he would have suffered from stage fright and could only perform properly when he is invisible. He was later replaced with Vincent, who inherits Marvin's timid personality, and the invisibility concept was used as the name of one of his songs, "Invisible Man". He has a crush on Yuko from the Manga Circle.
- Duke, Chester and Simon (듀크, 체스터, 사이먼; Dyukeu, Cheseuteo, Saimeon) (voiced by Jeon Tae-yeol, Lee Sang-jun and Um Sang-hyun) are members of the Band Circle, with Chester as the leader.

=== Computer Circle ===
- Bow Jr. (바우주니어; Baujunieo) is Bowstein's mischievous son and the leader of the Computer Circle. Due to becoming less talkative, he communicates via text message.
- Timmy, Andy and Choco Nara Strawberry Gongju (티미, 앤디, 쪼꼬나라 딸기공주; Timi, Aendi, Jjokko Nala Ttalgi Gongju) (voiced by Um Sang-hyun (Timmy; first voice), Cheon Ji-seon (Andy), Jeon Hae-ri (Choco Nara Strawberry Gongju) and Park Joo-gwang (Timmy; second voice)) are a trio of computer science truant students who hack into the school system. Dino tracks them down, and in the end, Timmy and Andy are captured by Sena, while Strawberry Gongju escapes. Timmy uses the nickname Power Supreme Genius (파워지존천재; Pawo Jijon Cheonjae) online and an avatar with blue hair and a mask; Andy uses the nickname Mr. Baby Duck (아기오리선생; Agi Oliseon Saeng) and a green duck avatar; and Strawberry Gongju's real name is unknown, but she uses a princess avatar in a crown and dress with twin tails. Strawberry Gongju's name is based on the Korean chicken and pizza brand Pizza Nara Chicken Gongju.

=== Detective Circle ===
- Doyle (도일; Doil) (voiced by Jeon Hae-ri) is a detective and the leader of the Detective Circle. He is named after Arthur Conan Doyle, is a parody of Sherlock Holmes, and wears a bowtie similar to Shinichi Kudo from Detective Conan.
- Kin (킨; Kin) (voiced by Park Joo-gwang) is a talking parrot owned by Doyle.

=== Occult Circle ===
- Occul and Cult (오컬&컬트; Okeol wa Keolteu) (voiced by Um Sang-hyun and Jeon Tae-yeol) are members of the Occult Circle, who summon beings from another world using a book. Occul has orange hair, and Cult has turquoise hair.

=== Demon World ===
- Cala and Mitty (칼라&미티; Kalla wa Miti) (voiced by Yoo Bo-ra and Lee Bo-yong), also known as the Calamity Sisters (칼라미티 시스터즈), are a duo of disastrous fairies and arch-nemeses of Lucky, who grant people's wishes in exchange for taking their souls.
- Lilith (리리스; Liliseu) (voiced by Lee Ji-hyun) is the princess, arch-nemesis of Teo and heiress of the Demon World. She aims to bring bad luck to people and make them unhappy.
- Demon (마왕; Mawang) (voiced by Jeon Tae-yeol) is the king of the Demon World and Lilith's father. He is based on Hades in Greek mythology.

=== News Circle ===
- Oliver (올리버; Ollibeo) (voiced by Shin Yong-woo) is a newspaper editor in the News Circle, who likes grapes.

=== Cheerleader Circle ===
- Cindy, Stephanie and Wendy (신디, 스테파니, 웬디; Sindi, Seutepani, Wendi) (voiced by Kim A-rong (Cindy; first voice), Yeo Min-jeong (Stephanie) and Cheon Ji-seon (Cindy; second voice, Wendy)) are a trio of cheerleaders and members of the Cheerleader Circle, with Stephanie as the leader and sometimes an extra. The total number of club members is unknown. A fourth unnamed member is occasionally seen, finally appearing as a supporting character in episode 7 of season 2.

=== Cooking Circle ===
- Murphy (머피; Meopi) (voiced by Jang Ye-na) is a cafeteria manager and the leader of the Cooking Circle.

=== Game Circle ===
- Eugene (유진; Yujin) (voiced by Kim Chae-ha) is a calm, laidback boy and the leader of the Game Circle, who first appeared in episode 24. He wears a scouter, which is used as a scanner to detect Papa Cat's robot's weakness in the final episode of season 2. He also stores bigger items in his pocket, from video game consoles to game chips and even remote controls.
- Steve (스티브; Seutibeu) (voiced by Um Sang-hyun (first voice) and Lee Sang-jun (second voice)) is a fat boy and a member of the Game Circle, who collects figures as a hobby. He appears as a missing member in the in-universe virtual reality game called Hero Fantasy. Although his name was not revealed, fans called him "Steven" due to his appearance resembling that of Steven Universe. Studio TNT noticed this, and gave the character the name "Steve".

=== Book Circle ===
- Jennifer (제니퍼; Jenipeo) (voiced by Yang Jeong-hwa) is a blue-skinned librarian and the leader of the Book Circle. She first appeared in episode 20. Because of her gloomy atmosphere and mysterious return date announcements, she becomes the main character of ghost stories that circulate around Popo School. Jennifer personally goes to inform of books that are due, seemingly indicating her diligence in club activities. She appears in a ghostly manner throughout the episode until her identity is revealed. She is also revealed to be an acquaintance of the Occult Circle. In episode 19 of season 2, she comes to the Hero Circle for help because everyone is increasingly afraid of her. Everyone agrees that it would be good to change her image, so she goes to the Manga Circle for help. The Manga Circle changes her costume and makeup, giving her the pretty star cosplay of "Jupiter". However, because of the high synchronization rate, she becomes too popular, so she eventually goes back to her original state, thinking that her own appearance is better. Jennifer later becomes close to someone who had not been afraid of her before. It is not revealed who that person is, and only their silhouette is shown, but the silhouette and voice are obviously that of Eugene. The ending credits even reveal Eugene's voice actress Kim Chae-ha.

=== Breeding Circle ===
- Teddy (테디; Tedi) (voiced by Kim A-rong) is a lion who works in the Breeding Circle, and one of the two anthropomorphic animal students to attend Popo School, the other being Ketchop. He first appeared in episode 12 of season 2. He specializes in parkour, and he catches a mother horned rabbit several times bigger than himself using only tree vines.
- The Horned Rabbits (뿔토끼; Ppultokki) are rare animals raised in the Breeding Circle. They are called horned rabbits because theirs ears resemble horns. Unlike regular rabbits, they like to eat mushrooms instead of carrots.

=== Theater Circle ===
- Charlie (찰리; Challi) (voiced by Cheon Ji-seon) is a theater director and the leader of the Theater Circle. She is also shown to be an actress, even when she is dying, becoming a different person when doing so. She casts the Hero Circle in the play, but they all have very bad acting skills. In response to the terrible reaction from the other students, she steps in as the real prince and revises the script, successfully finishing the play.
- Harper (하퍼; Hapeo) (voiced by Jang Ye-na) is a boy with freckles and blond hair, who works in the Theater Circle. When Charlie speaks, he thinks that her voice is low, so he speaks on her behalf, but also speaks indirectly so that the listener does not feel bad. This does not really have much effect, except that it raises Charlie's blood pressure because she hears everything. He respects Charlie very much.

=== Court Circle ===
- The Judge (재판장; Jaepanjang) (voiced by Kim Myeong-jun) appears in episode 16 of season 2. He is characterized by his haircut similar to that of lawyers from Commonwealth countries, and mostly acts as a quieting agent by striking down the gavel. The episode itself is a parody of the Ace Attorney series.

=== Other characters ===
- Bowstein (바우슈타인; Bausyutain) (voiced by Park Joo-gwang) is a robot dog with a high IQ and the headmaster of Popo School. He tries to look like a stern principal in front of the students, but is the type that easily shows his emotions. He worries a lot about his son, Bow Jr., who has recently become less talkative. His name is a combination of "bow-wow" (the onomatopoeia of a dog barking) and Albert Einstein.
- S.A.M. (샘; Saem) (voiced by Um Sang-hyun) is a robot who works as a teacher. He first appeared in episode 14. He is also cowardly; when Titch and his space pirates invade Popo School, he hides behind Bowstein when he confronts Titch, suggesting that they just report him. In episode 6 of season 2, he is revealed to have extraordinary cooking skills, due to his ability to absorb things with his body and having no sense of taste.
- Ketchop (캣촙; Kaeschob) (voiced by Um Sang-hyun) is a cat and the lowest subordinate of Papa Cat. He infiltrates Popo School and creates an unofficial club called the Villain Square, where he operates secretly. Despite being a villain, rather than pushing the Hero Circle members, he often appears as a damaged or victimized figure. Ketchop is mistaken for looking like a cat, but is a real cat. He has a speech quirk where he ends most of his sentences with "~chop" (~촙), which he also uses when laughing. His name is based on "ketchup", only with "o" in place of "u". He is quite good at cooking, as shown when he serves hotteok to the students when they skip lunch, and appears as a hot dog vendor in the final episode of season 2. He assists Papa Cat during his attack on Popo School, but unlike Papa Cat, who flees after being defeated, he is arrested.
- Papa Cat (파파캣; Papa Kaes) (voiced by Jeon Tae-yeol) is Ketchop's boss and the leader of an evil organization. He has a speech quirk where he ends most of his sentences with "~myo" (~묘). First appearing in episode 4, he appears occasionally whenever Ketchop contacts him, and he is surprisingly generous with him, such as listening to everything that Ketchop asks for, or telling Bow Jr. to educate him responsibly when he joins the Villain Square. He plays a major role in the final episode of season 2, where he uses a giant robot to attack Popo School, awakening it with a hacking chip that he received from Titch. His abilities include causing an earthquake with a simple jump, using ultrasound to incapacitate vampires, and even subduing Dino in his dinosaur form. However, the robot gradually gets damaged and pushed back by the students' continued attacks, and is defeated after the last attack by Cowman and Vlad. After his defeat, Papa Cat escapes, unlike Ketchop who is arrested by the police.
- The Police Circle (경찰부; Gyeongchalbu) is only mentioned in the series' opening and do not appear in season 1, but actually make their first appearance in episode 16 of season 2. Their position is similar to that of the leader, with them arresting Teo and putting him in prison, but they are portrayed as having more powerful authority.
- Cowman (카우맨; Kaumaen) (voiced by Um Sang-hyun) is a famous cow superhero who first appeared in episode 2. He becomes stronger by drinking milk. His catchphrase is "Justice is upheld!" ("정의는 지켜젖소~!") Cowman visits Popo School and conducts daily lessons for the Hero Circle. He is captured by some squid monsters, along with Sena, who secretly followed him into battle, but defeats the monsters by powering up with the milk that Sena gave him. Afterward, he tells Bowstein that he brought the Hero Circle to school so that they won't get into trouble. Sena wears a Cowman costume for Halloween in episode 8 of season 2.
- Hamkong (햄콩이; Haemkong-i) (voiced by Kim A-rong) is a hamster who first appeared in episode 6, where Dino finds him in a trash can. While secretly playing with Hamkong, Teo accidentally throws him into a beaker filled with a height-growth potion, which causes him to grow into a giant hamster. He grows so big that Lucky ends up taking it to Heaven to raise. In episode 20 of season 2, he comes down to Earth with Lucky. Dino is running wild in his dinosaur form because the potion that would have made Hamkong return to his original size was destroyed by the sea monster's rampage. When Dino sees Hamkong, he shrinks to his original size.
- Titch (티치; Tichi) (voiced by Jeon Tae-yeol) is a rat and the leader of a group of space pirates. He first appeared in episode 14, where he and the pirates invade Popo School to find treasure. He is slightly smaller than Bowstein, and captures him and S.A.M. even after the latter defeats his subordinates with his martial arts skills. The Hero Circle knocks out one of Titch's subordinates and use his suit as a disguise to sneak aboard his ship to rescue Bowstein and S.A.M. Seeing Titch's fluffy mustache, Lucky tries to touch it, causing a commotion inside the Hero Circle's disguise, which ends with Dino transforming into a dinosaur, causing the ship to crash. Since Titch tells the "subordinate" to go and rest when he appears to be in bad condition (due to Sena escaping the suit) and calls the medical team (due to the commotion inside the suit), he seems to be surprisingly good at providing welfare.
- Vlad (블라드; Beulladeu) (voiced by Shin Yong-woo) is Vincent's cousin, who first appeared in episode 16, where he visits Vincent and invites him to attend the Moonlight Party. He is a vampire with a handsome face and gentle personality who is kind to Vincent, as well as Teo, Sena and Bonnie (his enemy). He does not appear to transform into a bat like Vincent, but he uses teleportation, where he pulls over his cloak and disappears. He seems to be good at baking, as he comes out of the party holding a tray of cookies. In episode 3 of season 2, he is seen baking when talking to Vincent, and later distributes bread and cookies to the Hero Circle members. Aside from his gentle and kind behavior, he is quite good at fighting. He even had a record of battling with Bonnie's father, a professional vampire hunter in episode 18 of season 2, showing his ability to withstand an explosive thrown by the latter. In the final episode of season 2, when the Hero Circle is attacked by Papa Cat, he shows up with his vampire subordinates to break the defense barrier and cut off the giant robot's fist.
- Graham (그레이햄; Geuleihaem) is Teslee's hamster who first appeared in episode 17. Teslee plans to use him as a trap for Dino, knowing that cute animals are his weakness, but ends up falling for the hamster's cuteness.
- God (신; Sin) (voiced by Um Sang-hyun) is the god of Heaven and Lucky's father, who helps his daughter whenever she is in danger. He is based on Zeus from Greek mythology. He uses lightning as a weapon.
- Pugnardo (퍼그나르도; Peogeunaleudo) (voiced by Lee Sang-jun) is a pug and the principal of Caesar School, and rival to Bowstein. He first appeared in episode 7 of season 2. He is a mean-spirited person who will do anything to win, including breaking rules and cheating. Due to having previously competed in a track and field competition with Popo School, he seems to be in conflict with the school. He and Bowstein have similar tastes in snacks.
- The Vampire Hunter (뱀파이어 헌터; Baempaieo Heonteo) (voiced by Lee Sang-jun) is Bonnie's father and a professional vampire hunter. He is so skilled that he can tell vampires apart by smell alone, and always carries a giant sword. He first appeared in episode 18 of season 2, where he stops by Popo School. There he realizes that Bonnie still dreams of becoming a hunter, unaware of her actual dreams of becoming a manga artist. He hates vampires so much that he does not even recognize the peace treaty. Because of this, when he kidnaps Vincent due to needing the vampire's guidance to head to the mansion where the vampires live, Vlad blocks him and tries to resolve the issue through peace. Then, when Vlad's movements suddenly slow down and he is pushed back, he laughs at him, but it turns out that Vlad was guarding Bonnie the whole time, and only retreats when Bonnie confesses that she does not want to become a hunter. At this moment, when he is about to change his perception of vampires a little by saying that he was indebted to Vlad, he sends a letter to Bonnie telling her that these were also the vampires' schemes and not to be fooled.

== Episodes ==
=== Season 1 ===
Episode	Title	Directed by	Written by	Original release date
1	"SNS Star (인터넷 스타)"	Han Soo-yeon (한수연), Jeon Kyeong-jin (전경진)	Lee Ho-jin (이호진), Han Soo-yeon (한수연)	June 29, 2020
2	"Cowman (영웅 카우맨)"	Han Soo-yeon (한수연), Jeon Kyeong-jin (전경진)	Lee Ho-jin (이호진), Han Soo-yeon (한수연)	June 30, 2020
3	"Debbie's Garden (데비의 정원)"	Han Soo-yeon (한수연), Jeon Kyeong-jin (전경진)	Lee Ho-jin (이호진), Han Soo-yeon (한수연)	July 6, 2020
4	"Go Getta Robot (출동! 로봇)"	Han Soo-yeon (한수연), Jeon Kyeong-jin (전경진)	Lee Ho-jin (이호진), Han Soo-yeon (한수연)	July 7, 2020
5	"UFO (미확인 비행물체)"	Han Soo-yeon (한수연), Jeon Kyeong-jin (전경진)	Lee Ho-jin (이호진), Han Soo-yeon (한수연)	July 13, 2020
6	"Colossally Cute (괴수 햄콩이)"	Han Soo-yeon (한수연), Jeon Kyeong-jin (전경진)	Lee Ho-jin (이호진), Han Soo-yeon (한수연)	July 14, 2020
7	"Vampire Hunter (뱀파이어 헌터)"	Han Soo-yeon (한수연), Jeon Kyeong-jin (전경진)	Lee Ho-jin (이호진), Han Soo-yeon (한수연)	July 20, 2020
8	"Fortune Stone (포츈 스톤)"	Han Soo-yeon (한수연), Jeon Kyeong-jin (전경진)	Lee Ho-jin (이호진), Han Soo-yeon (한수연)	July 21, 2020
9	"Dis-Band (해체 위기 밴드부)"	Han Soo-yeon (한수연), Jeon Kyeong-jin (전경진)	Lee Ho-jin (이호진), Han Soo-yeon (한수연)	July 27, 2020
10	"Marvin's Memoirs (용기 있는 고백)"	Han Soo-yeon (한수연), Jeon Kyeong-jin (전경진)	Lee Ho-jin (이호진), Han Soo-yeon (한수연)	July 28, 2020
11	"Ducking Out (추적, 무단결석)"	Han Soo-yeon (한수연), Jeon Kyeong-jin (전경진)	Lee Ho-jin (이호진), Han Soo-yeon (한수연)	August 3, 2020
12	"Rebel With a Cause (바우주니어의 일탈)"	Han Soo-yeon (한수연), Jeon Kyeong-jin (전경진)	Lee Ho-jin (이호진), Han Soo-yeon (한수연)	August 4, 2020
13	"The Hang-Up (고장난 휴대폰)"	Han Soo-yeon (한수연), Jeon Kyeong-jin (전경진)	Lee Ho-jin (이호진), Han Soo-yeon (한수연)	August 10, 2020
14	"Space Pirate Titch (약탈자 티치)"	Han Soo-yeon (한수연), Jeon Kyeong-jin (전경진)	Lee Ho-jin (이호진), Han Soo-yeon (한수연)	August 11, 2020
15	"Basement Bounty (미궁탐험)"	Han Soo-yeon (한수연), Jeon Kyeong-jin (전경진)	Lee Ho-jin (이호진), Han Soo-yeon (한수연)	August 17, 2020
16	"Vamp Paradise (문라이트 파티)"	Han Soo-yeon (한수연), Jeon Kyeong-jin (전경진)	Lee Ho-jin (이호진), Han Soo-yeon (한수연)	August 18, 2020
17	"Dino's Rival (디노의 라이벌)"	Han Soo-yeon (한수연), Jeon Kyeong-jin (전경진)	Lee Ho-jin (이호진), Han Soo-yeon (한수연)	August 24, 2020
18	"Detective Doyle (명탐정 도일)"	Han Soo-yeon (한수연), Jeon Kyeong-jin (전경진)	Lee Ho-jin (이호진), Han Soo-yeon (한수연)	August 25, 2020
19	"Summoning Calamity (칼라미티 시스터즈)"	Han Soo-yeon (한수연), Jeon Kyeong-jin (전경진)	Lee Ho-jin (이호진), Han Soo-yeon (한수연)	August 31, 2020
20	"School Ghost Story (학교괴담)"	Han Soo-yeon (한수연), Jeon Kyeong-jin (전경진)	Lee Ho-jin (이호진), Han Soo-yeon (한수연)	September 1, 2020
21	"Demon Princess (마계 공주 리리스)"	Han Soo-yeon (한수연), Jeon Kyeong-jin (전경진)	Lee Ho-jin (이호진), Han Soo-yeon (한수연)	September 7, 2020
22	"No Luck Left (사라진 럭키)"	Han Soo-yeon (한수연), Jeon Kyeong-jin (전경진)	Lee Ho-jin (이호진), Han Soo-yeon (한수연)	September 8, 2020
23	"Slice of Heaven (천상의 간식)"	Han Soo-yeon (한수연), Jeon Kyeong-jin (전경진)	Lee Ho-jin (이호진), Han Soo-yeon (한수연)	September 14, 2020
24	"Game On (게임 속 세상)"	Han Soo-yeon (한수연), Jeon Kyeong-jin (전경진)	Lee Ho-jin (이호진), Han Soo-yeon (한수연)	September 15, 2020
25	"Getting Into Dodge (교내 피구대회 상편)"	Han Soo-yeon (한수연), Jeon Kyeong-jin (전경진)	Lee Ho-jin (이호진), Han Soo-yeon (한수연)	September 21, 2020
26	"Getting Out of Dodge (교내 피구대회 하편)"	Han Soo-yeon (한수연), Jeon Kyeong-jin (전경진)	Lee Ho-jin (이호진), Han Soo-yeon (한수연)	September 22, 2020

=== Season 2 ===
Episode	Title	Directed by	Written by	Original release date
1	"Formation, Hero Circle (결성, 히어로 써클)"	Han Soo-yeon (한수연), Jeon Kyeong-jin (전경진)	Lee Ho-jin (이호진), Han Soo-yeon (한수연)	June 29, 2022
2	"Cursed Sofa (저주받은 소파)"	Han Soo-yeon (한수연), Jeon Kyeong-jin (전경진)	Lee Ho-jin (이호진), Han Soo-yeon (한수연)	June 29, 2022
3	"Teo's Vampire Crisis (태오, 뱀파이어 위기)"	Han Soo-yeon (한수연), Jeon Kyeong-jin (전경진)	Lee Ho-jin (이호진), Han Soo-yeon (한수연)	July 6, 2022
4	"News Circle Appears (신문부 등장)"	Han Soo-yeon (한수연), Jeon Kyeong-jin (전경진)	Lee Ho-jin (이호진), Han Soo-yeon (한수연)	July 6, 2022
5	"Gaming Competition (게임대회)"	Han Soo-yeon (한수연), Jeon Kyeong-jin (전경진)	Lee Ho-jin (이호진), Han Soo-yeon (한수연)	July 13, 2022
6	"Cafeteria Strike (급식부 파업)"	Han Soo-yeon (한수연), Jeon Kyeong-jin (전경진)	Lee Ho-jin (이호진), Han Soo-yeon (한수연)	July 13, 2022
7	"Fighting Cheerleader Circle (파이팅, 치어리더부)"	Han Soo-yeon (한수연), Jeon Kyeong-jin (전경진)	Lee Ho-jin (이호진), Han Soo-yeon (한수연)	July 20, 2022
8	"Halloween Mayhem (핼러윈 대소동)"	Han Soo-yeon (한수연), Jeon Kyeong-jin (전경진)	Lee Ho-jin (이호진), Han Soo-yeon (한수연)	July 20, 2022
9	"Strange Teachers (선생님이 이상해)"	Han Soo-yeon (한수연), Jeon Kyeong-jin (전경진)	Lee Ho-jin (이호진), Han Soo-yeon (한수연)	July 27, 2022
10	"Swapped Superpowers (뒤바뀐 초능력)"	Han Soo-yeon (한수연), Jeon Kyeong-jin (전경진)	Lee Ho-jin (이호진), Han Soo-yeon (한수연)	July 27, 2022
11	"Kidnapped Teacher (납치당하신 선생님)"	Han Soo-yeon (한수연), Jeon Kyeong-jin (전경진)	Lee Ho-jin (이호진), Han Soo-yeon (한수연)	August 3, 2022
12	"Mysterious Beasts and Where to Find Them (신비동물 사육부)"	Han Soo-yeon (한수연), Jeon Kyeong-jin (전경진)	Lee Ho-jin (이호진), Han Soo-yeon (한수연)	August 3, 2022
13	"Transfer Student Release (전학생 리리스)"	Han Soo-yeon (한수연), Jeon Kyeong-jin (전경진)	Lee Ho-jin (이호진), Han Soo-yeon (한수연)	August 10, 2022
14	"Cala's Request (칼라의 부탁)"	Han Soo-yeon (한수연), Jeon Kyeong-jin (전경진)	Lee Ho-jin (이호진), Han Soo-yeon (한수연)	August 10, 2022
15	"Theater Circle Audition (연극부 오디션)"	Han Soo-yeon (한수연), Jeon Kyeong-jin (전경진)	Lee Ho-jin (이호진), Han Soo-yeon (한수연)	August 17, 2022
16	"Fierce Attorney (격전재판)"	Han Soo-yeon (한수연), Jeon Kyeong-jin (전경진)	Lee Ho-jin (이호진), Han Soo-yeon (한수연)	August 17, 2022
17	"Marvin's Secret Operation (마빈의 비밀작전)"	Han Soo-yeon (한수연), Jeon Kyeong-jin (전경진)	Lee Ho-jin (이호진), Han Soo-yeon (한수연)	August 24, 2022
18	"Leader of the Hunter Family (헌터가문의 수장)"	Han Soo-yeon (한수연), Jeon Kyeong-jin (전경진)	Lee Ho-jin (이호진), Han Soo-yeon (한수연)	August 24, 2022
19	"Worries of a Librarian (도서부장의 고민)"	Han Soo-yeon (한수연), Jeon Kyeong-jin (전경진)	Lee Ho-jin (이호진), Han Soo-yeon (한수연)	August 31, 2022
20	"Dino's Determination (디노의 결심)"	Han Soo-yeon (한수연), Jeon Kyeong-jin (전경진)	Lee Ho-jin (이호진), Han Soo-yeon (한수연)	August 31, 2022
21	"Secret of Cityside Academy (포포스쿨의 비밀)"	Han Soo-yeon (한수연), Jeon Kyeong-jin (전경진)	Lee Ho-jin (이호진), Han Soo-yeon (한수연)	September 7, 2022
22	"Superpower Overload (초능력 과부하)"	Han Soo-yeon (한수연), Jeon Kyeong-jin (전경진)	Lee Ho-jin (이호진), Han Soo-yeon (한수연)	September 7, 2022
23	"Time Machine (타임머신)"	Han Soo-yeon (한수연), Jeon Kyeong-jin (전경진)	Lee Ho-jin (이호진), Han Soo-yeon (한수연)	September 14, 2022
24	"Caesar School Athletics Competition (시저스쿨 육상대회)"	Han Soo-yeon (한수연), Jeon Kyeong-jin (전경진)	Lee Ho-jin (이호진), Han Soo-yeon (한수연)	September 14, 2022
25	"Cityside Academy's Crisis Part 1 (포포스쿨의 위기 1)"	Han Soo-yeon (한수연), Jeon Kyeong-jin (전경진)	Lee Ho-jin (이호진), Han Soo-yeon (한수연)	September 21, 2022
26	"Cityside Academy's Crisis Part 2 (포포스쿨의 위기 2)"	Han Soo-yeon (한수연), Jeon Kyeong-jin (전경진)	Lee Ho-jin (이호진), Han Soo-yeon (한수연)	September 21, 2022

== Production ==
Hero Circle was originally planned as an English education video (complete with a comic adaptation) and made for a portfolio, shown on Studio TNT's website, but was made into a television series. Later, a modified pilot episode version was created, which was very similar to the final series. Several other lead characters were added, including Vincent and Bowstein. The series' pitch was developed by Antony Norman Gusscott at Sprinkles on Top. It was produced in 2D FHD animation using Toon Boom Harmony. The music was produced and recorded at Soundscool.

In 2017, Studio TNT participated in KNock 2017, an investment attraction briefing session. The series won the Best Project Award at the Pre-Production Bootcamp hosted by the Korea Creative Content Agency in 2018, who selected the series as a domestic animation production support target in 2019. It received much attention both domestically and internationally, including being selected for the EBS Co-Production Contest and advancing to the final stage of the 2018 Asia Animation Summit. (Note: Atttributed to multiple references:) In 2019, Studio TNT signed a global distribution contract with American distributor Ryan Posey through the Kidscreen Summit held in Miami in the United States.

On November 14, 2020, news of Season 2's production was announced through the series' official Twitter account QNA. It was also being co-produced by Mesmor Studios. It was later announced on June 3, 2022 that Season 2 would be broadcast at 7 pm from June 29, 2022 to September 21, 2022.

Funding for Vincent dolls (in his bat form) and goodies including keyrings, mugs, flip books and stickers was carried out between December 4–31, 2020, a total of 28 days. The target amount was reached on the first day of funding.

== International broadcast ==
On November 18, 2020, it was announced that Meta Media Entertainment had been appointed as the worldwide distributor for the series. An English dub was written by Evan Menzel and produced at Tribe Audio, with episodes 1, 4, 16 and 19 being available on Meta Media's website and Toon Goggles. On December 18, 2021, the series began airing at 2 pm every Saturday and Sunday on NET in Indonesia. The series was also broadcast on 9 Cartoon and Cartoon Club in Thailand as แก๊งป่วนก๊วนฮีโร่ ("The Hero Gang"). In September 2026, the English dub of the series began airing for the first time on the British/Irish children channel Pop, which also includes episodes unreleased in English beforehand.

== Reception ==
Shortly after it aired, the series became popular on Twitter. Studio TNT responded to the reaction with active communication, such as posting a congratulatory message or holding a Q&A to reciprocate the fans' reaction. In addition, nicknames given by fans to some unnamed supporting characters were set as official names.

Between December 1–15, 2022, a survey for the "Best 10 Children's Programs" (including Hero Circle) was created and gained encouraging popularity on EBS Kids and other children's channels.

== Other media ==
On February 10, 2021, Hero Circle Run (Korean: 히어로 써클 런) was released on iPhone and Android. Developed by Studio TNT and Drakemount, it is a horizantal-scrolling platform game where the characters (trapped inside their phones by Papa Cat) run through various levels while using their superpowers. The game was originally planned for release in October 2020. There were also plans to publish a comic adaptation of the series, though there have not been any announcements about said adaptation as of April 2026.
