= Blue Birthday =

2021 South Korean web series

- Promotional poster
- Hangul: 블루버스데이
- RR: Beullu beoseudei
- MR: Pŭllu pŏsŭdei
- Genre: Fantasy; Romance; Thriller
- Created by: Naver Corporation
- Screenplay by: Goo So-yeon; Moon Won-young
- Directed by: Park Dan-hee
- Starring: Kim Ye-rim; Yang Hong-seok
- Country of origin: South Korea
- Original language: Korean
- No. of episodes: 16

Production
- Running time: 20–28 minutes
- Production company: Playlist Studio

Original release
- Network: Naver TV; YouTube
- Release: July 23 – August 11, 2021

Blue Birthday (Korean: 블루버스데이) is a South Korean drama web series produced by Naver subsidiary Playlist Studio. Directed by Park Dan-hee and co-written by Goo So-yeon and Moon Won-young, the series stars Kim Ye-rim as Oh Ha-rin and Yang Hong-seok as Ji Seo-jun. The series is a fantasy romance thriller drama in which the female protagonist, Oh Ha-rin, revisits the past through mysterious photos left by her first love, who died on her birthday 10 years ago. It premiered on July 23, 2021, on Naver TV and WeTV, and aired every Friday and Saturday at 19:00 (KST). It also became available on YouTube to audiences from South Korea on August 6, 2021.

== Synopsis ==
The series tells the story of Oh Ha-rin (Kim Ye-rim), who travels to the past through mysterious photos left by her first love, Ji Seo-joon (Yang Hong-seok). They had been close friends since they were eight years old, but he died by suicide on her birthday ten years ago. On her 28th birthday, Ha-rin receives an exceptional opportunity as a gift; using mysterious photos left behind by Seo-jun, Ha-Rin goes back to that day in the past to find out why he chose to die, and to save his life.

== Plot ==
The series opens with Oh Ha-rin witnessing her best friend and first love, Ji Seo-joon, lying dead in a pool of blood in the photography studio of their school on her 18th birthday. Ten years later, Oh Ha-rin now works at an animal protection center, and gets a task to rescue an animal from her previous high school. She can get the job done despite traumatizing memories. While leaving from work, Ha-rin comes across an old photo shop and notices Seo-joon's camera on display, buying the camera and some old photographs from the mysterious shop owner, who warns her not to get stuck in the past. A confused Ha-rin goes to her birthday party organized by her friends and leaves after one of them, Kim Ui-young, mentions the unexpected and mysterious suicide of Seo-joon. After going through all the photos, Ha-rin decides to burn them, and throws one of the nine photos into the fire, only to wake up as a high school student in 2011. Seeing Seo-joon alive and on his bike, she pretends it to be a dream and runs towards her lost friend. She trips on the stairs but is able to catch up with him and hug him, which is caught by her now younger friends. Throughout the day, Ha-rin acts weirdly and follows Seo-joon, but when the day ends, she returns to reality. This is when she realizes that burning one photo from the bundle can transport the person back to the same day the photo was taken.

The next time she time travels, she finds herself watching Seo-jun's PE class where he hurts his left hand, and recalls the police information that mentioned he had cut his artery in his right hand. However, this would be impossible as Seo-jun was left-handed. When she sees him drinking soda, she realizes that Seo-jun didn't kill himself but was actually murdered. She tells him out loud, but he brushes it off. With the help of Eun-song, Ha-rin can get Kim Shin-woo arrested, only to find out that he is a witness and that the murderer is actually a female. It is then revealed that Ji Hye-min is the real killer and, with her aware of the secret of traveling back to the past, she steals all the pictures from Ha-rin's house and burns them to travel back in time to murder Shin-woo.

When a video recorder is found, the group goes through the video and sees a girl wearing the same hairpin and jacket as their friend Do Soo-jin. Thus they start suspecting her of murdering Shin-woo. However, she has an alibi which is revealed at the police station. Soo-jin was suffering from constipation and went home by asking for a lift from a delivery person of a Chinese eatery, but could not remember the name. The group hears her alibi and decides to save her. Seo-joon and Ha-rin then find another camera whose contents reveal that Hye-min is the real killer, and that she disguised herself as Soo-jin to murder Shin-woo. Hye-min had a troubled past and therefore had developed psychopathic tendencies. She believed that Seo-jun was only a substitute for her, and now that she had returned, he should die for living her life until now. While being taken away to prison by police officers, Hye-min tries to run away, but dies in a car accident. In the end, Ha-rin and Seo-jun live happily together.

== Cast ==
=== Main ===
- Kim Ye-rim as Oh Ha-rin
  - Kim So-yoon as young Oh Ha-rin

After losing her first love ten years ago, Ha-rin works at an abandoned animal protection center. On the day of her 18th birthday, Ha-rin decided to confess her feelings to Seo-joon, only to find him dead in their high school photography studio, ultimately unable to tell him how she felt. Ten years later, she accidentally receives mysterious photos left behind by Seo-joon, and travels back to the past numerous times to save his life.

- Yang Hong-seok as Ji Seo-joon
  - Moon Joo-won as young Ji Seo-jun

Seo-joon was Oh Ha-rin's first love who died ten years ago on her 18th birthday; according to all official reports, he died due to suicide. He was a popular student and had amicable relationships with all of his schoolmates. He also performed well academically. However, apart from a confession of his feelings in a letter to Ha-rin, he admits that he does not open up to others easily and can be moody and jealous underneath his bright and easygoing personality. Ha-rin finds this letter on her 28th birthday, which ultimately leads to her discovering the time travel capabilities of the photographs, and her attempts to save his life.

=== Supporting ===
- Lee Sang-jun as Cha Eun-song

Eun-song reporter from the social affairs department who had a crush on Ha-rin in the past. He was born into a wealthy family and is a positive person. He helps 28-year-old Ha-rin investigate Ji Seo-jun's death when she suspects there may be more to his case than meets the eye.

- Kim Gyeol-yoo as Do Soo-jin
  - Park So-jeong as young Do Soo-jin

Ha-rin's best friend. She is a loving and kind person who cares deeply for Ha-rin, and she perhaps understands the most about the effect Seo-jun's death had on Ha-rin. She is in a relationship with Kim Ui-young.

- Park Joo-hyun as Kim Ui-young

Do Soo-jin's boyfriend and a close friend of Ha-rin and Seo-jun.

- Kim Yi-seo as Ji Hye-min
  - Jeong Ye-dam as young Ji Hye-min

Ji Seo-jun's older sister. She runs a cafe and takes care of her parents, who struggled after the sudden death of her brother. She is good friends with Ha-rin in the present.

- Lee Dong-joo as Kim Shin-woo

Shin-woo is a student who hated Ji Seo-joon. Decades later, he works as a chemical medicine delivery agent to steal zoletil.

=== Special appearances ===
- Song Min-hyung as the photo studio owner (Ep. 1–2, 10 and 16)
- Yoo Su-bin as the senior at Seoyeon High School (Ep. 3)
- Min Chae-yeon as Ha-rin's co-worker (Ep. 5, 8-9 and 16)
- Lee Byung-jae as the detective (Ep. 9)
- Moon Sang-hoon as the geography teacher

== Episodes ==
No.	Title	Original release date
1	"My Bad Birthday"; Transliteration: "Nae Nappeun Saeng-il" (Korean: 내 나쁜 생일)	July 23, 2021
Ending Message: Burn the photo and the time travel starts.
2	"You're in My Dream"; Transliteration: "Dangsineun Nae Kkumeisseo" (Korean: 당신은 내 꿈에있어)	July 24, 2021
Ending Message: When there's tinnitus, go back to the reality.
3	"Lively Ordinary Days"; Transliteration: "Soranhan Botongnal" (Korean: 소란한 보통날)	July 30, 2021
Ending Message: Burn a photo, and time goes back, but no one can bring it back to life.
4	"Law of Equivalent Exchange"; Transliteration: "Deunggagyohwanui Beopchik" (Korean: 등가교환의 법칙)	July 31, 2021
Ending Message: A changed past affects the present.
5	"Another Chance"; Transliteration: "Tto Hanbeon, Jihoega Chajawatda" (Korean: 또 한번, 지회가 찾아왔다)	August 6, 2021
Ending Message: Time travel is only available on the photo-taking day before midnight.
6	"What Happened That Day"; Transliteration: "Geu Narui Sasilgwa Jinsil" (Korean: 그 날의 사실과 진실)	August 7, 2021
Ending Message: Photos for time travel can't be copied.
7	"It's You, Isn't It?"; Transliteration: "Neo Majji?" (Korean: 너 맞지?)	August 13, 2021
Ending Message: Only photos were taken with old films and cameras with young Seo Jun enable time travel.
8	"Crisis"; Transliteration: "Wigi" (Korean: 위기)	August 14, 2021
Ending Message: A damaged photo can't activate any time travel.
9	"Witness"; Transliteration: "Mokgyeokja" (Korean: 목격자)	August 20, 2021
Ending Message: Anyone can have a time travel.
10	"If We Have Such A Big Misfortune"; Transliteration: "Uriege Dakchil Bulhaeng-ui Keugi" (Korean: 우리에게 닥칠 불행의 크기)	August 21, 2021
Ending Message: Misfortune comes with time travel.
11	"Each Other's"; Transliteration: "Seoroga Seororeul" (Korean: 서로가 서로를)	August 27, 2021
Ending Message: Completely faded photos can't be restored.
12	"Suspicion"; Transliteration: "Uisim" (Korean: 의심)	August 28, 2021
Ending Message: Changed memories come back when they're activated.
13	"Abandoned Girl"; Transliteration: "Beoryeojin Ai" (Korean: 버려진 아이)	September 3, 2021
Ending Message: More than one person can have a time travel at the same time.
14	"Never Regret"; Transliteration: "Huhoehaji Anha" (Korean: 후회하지 않아)	September 4, 2021
Ending Message: During the time travel, the real time is frozen.
15	"Disappear"; Transliteration: "Sarajinda" (Korean: 사라진다)	September 10, 2021
Ending Message: According to how your roll it, you will get different numbers of photos.
16	"My Blue Birthday"	September 11, 2021
Ending Message: Someone also has the films and camera that can enable time travel.

== Production ==
=== Development ===
The series was produced by Playlist, a production company known for producing several hit web drama for the 10s-20s generation, including the A-Teen, A-Teen 2 and Love Playlist series. Directed by Park Dan-hee and written by Goo So-yeon and Moon Won-young, it is a work that challenges new genres and materials by reuniting with the production team, who had gathered topics with ending series such as The Best Ending (2019) and Ending Again (2020).

Principal photography on the series wrapped in June 2021 after 3 months of filming. On June 23, the stills from filming of the series were released.

=== Casting ===
On March 30, 2021, Joy News24 announced that Kim Ye-rim and Yang Hong-seok were in talks to star in the series. Following news reported the script reading was held in Seoul on April 5, 2021, and Ye-rim and Hong-seok were confirmed as the protagonists of the series. On May 14, Lee Sang-jun was confirmed to be joining the cast, followed by Kim Gyeol-yoo on May 25.

=== Marketing ===
Kim Ye-rim and Yang Hong-seok appeared on SBS Power FM's Wendy's Young Street, Naver NOW's Seulgi.zip and KBS Cool FM's Kang Han-na's Volume Up on July 16, 20 and 21, respectively.

=== Release ===
A teaser video was released on June 10 on the occasion of Ha-rin's birthday. The production team explained, "This video contains the meaning of 'Blue Birthday', the first love who chose death on the day of her birthday. Through the videos and images that will be released, the inner story will be revealed little by little." The series aired on Naver TV on July 23. It premiered on YouTube on August 6.

== Original soundtrack ==
The soundtrack for Blue Birthday consists of three songs, including remakes of two popular Korean songs that were released in 2011.

=== Part 1 ===
Released on August 4, 2021
No.	Title	Original Singer	Length
1.	"On Rainy Days (2021 ver)" (Heize)	Highlight	3:50
2.	"On Rainy Days (2021 ver)" (Inst.)		3:50
Total length:			7:40

=== Part 2 ===
Released on August 17, 2021
No.	Title	Original Singer	Length
1.	"Any Day, Any Words (2021 ver)" (O3ohn)	Lucia with Epitone Project	4:07
2.	"Any Day, Any Words (2021 ver)" (Inst.)		4:07
Total length:			8:14

=== Part 3 ===
Released on August 24, 2021
No.	Title	Lyrics	Music	Singer	Length
1.	"It's You"	Colde; Stally	Colde; basecamp; Stally	Colde	3:13
2.	"It's You" (Inst.)		Colde; basecamp; Stally		3:13
Total length:					6:26

=== Part 4 ===
Released on September 2, 2021
No.	Title	Lyrics	Music	Artist	Length
1.	"It's You (Yeri of Red Velvet Ver.)"	Colde; Stally	Colde; Basecamp; Stally	Yeri (Red Velvet)	3:16
2.	"It's You (Yeri of Red Velvet Ver.)" (Inst.)		Colde; Basecamp; Stally	Yeri (Red Velvet)	3:16
Total length:					6:30

=== Chart performance ===
Title	Year	Peak positions	Remarks	Ref.
Title	Year	KOR	Remarks	Ref.
"On Rainy Days (2021)" (비가 오는 날엔 (2021)) (Heize)	2021	18	Part 1	

== Reception ==
Since its first broadcast in July, Blue Birthday has ranked first among all Korean content on AbemaTV, a platform for simultaneous broadcasting in Japan. In China, it ranked 7th as the most popular video among all Korean content on streaming sites, and a kind of open chat room was operated to share pictures of the main characters and talk about the drama in real time. The number of visitors to the fan page in China reached about 3.58 million. Apart from this, the global OTT platform Viki, which is being serviced in the America, Europe, and Oceania, contains 'Best reversal and suspense! Recommendation'.

== Accolades ==
Award ceremony	Year	Category	Nominee	Result	Ref.
APAN Star Awards	2022	Web Drama Award	Blue Birthday	Nominated	

== Remake ==
A Japanese television series of the same title, starring Shion Tsurubo and Airi Matsui, aired on Kansai Telecasting Corporation starting February 8, 2023. The series featured "Romance" by JO1 as the official theme song for the series.
