= Nirun Boonyarattaphan =

Thai voice actor

- Born: 9 March 1955 (age 70); Singburi, Thailand
- Occupations: Voice actor; presenter
- Years active: 1975–2024
- Known for: Thai voices of Gian and Norimaki Senbei

Nirun Boonyarattaphan (Thai: นิรันดร์ บุญยรัตพันธุ์; RTGS: Niran Bunyarattaphan) also known as Natoi Senbei (น้าต๋อย เซมเบ้; Natoi Sembe) is a Thai voice actor and television host.

He has been a regular voice actor for the anime programming block 9 Cartoon, also appearing as a children's TV presenter for 9 Cartoon during the 1980s and 2000s. Nirun got his nickname in voice acting industry from the character Norimaki Senbei from Dr. Slump, the role which made him famous amongst young cartoon fans as Natoi Senbe. The term 'Na' in Thai means 'a younger sibling of mother', while 'Toi' is his real nickname.

== Filmography ==
=== Voice over roles ===
==== Anime ====
- Doraemon - Goda Takeshi
- Dr. Slump - Senbei Norimaki
- Tōshō Daimos - Kazuya Ryūzaki
- Cobra - Cobra
- Dragon Quest: The Adventure of Dai - Pop, Baran
- Fist of the North Star - Kenshiro, Juda
- Saint Seiya: The Lost Canvas - Pegasus Tenma, Pisces Albafica
- Ghost Sweeper Mikami - Tadao Yokoshima
- Yu Yu Hakusho - Urameshi Yūsuke, Seiryu, Suzuki, Elder Toguro, Karasu, Itsuki
- City Hunter - Saeba Ryo
- Kinnikuman - Kinniku Suguru
- Dream Soldier Wingman - Hirono Kenta
- Pokémon - Takeshi
- Revolutionary Girl Utena - Kyouichi Saionji, Akio Ohtori
- Sailor Moon - Mamoru Chiba
- Magic Knight Rayearth - Zagato, Lantis
- Beyblade V-Force - Hiwatari Kai
- Zatch Bell! - Kiyo Takamine
- Kyō Kara Ore Wa!! - Takashi Mitsuhashi
- Inuyasha - Inuyasha
- Mirmo! - Setsu Yuki
- Slam Dunk - Sakuragi Hanamichi, Maki Shinichi
- Hunter X Hunter - Leorio
- Gundam Wing - Heero Yuy
- Dragon Ball Z - Goku, Frieza
- Saint Seiya - Pegasus Seiya
- Saint Seiya: Chapter Hades - Pegasus Seiya, Taurus Aldebaran
- Digimon Savers - Daimon Masaru
- The Law of Ueki - Ueki Kosuke
- Tokyo Mew Mew - Masaya Aoyama
- Tokyo Babylon - Subaru Sumeragi
- The Prince of Tennis - Tezuka Kunimitsu
- Yaiba - Musashi Miyamoto, Takeshi Onimaru, Gekko
- Detective Conan - Kudo Shinichi, Mouri Kogoro (since season 2)
- Inazuma Eleven - Shuya Goenji, Heigoro Kabeyama
- Ranma ½ (Modernine TV dub) - Saotome Ranma
- Pygmalio - Aznus
- RG Veda - Yasha-ō
- Shōnen Onmyōji - Abe no Seimei
- Idaten Jump - Koei
- Kato-chan Ken-chan Gokigen TV - The Detective Story - Ken Shimura
- Ronin Warriors (Channel 5) - Ryo Sanada, Sage Date
- Perman - Birdman

==== Tokusatsu dubbing ====
- Dai Sentai Goggle-V - Ken'ichi Akama/Goggle Red, Kanpei Kuroda/Goggle Black
- Chōjin Sentai Jetman - Ryū Tendō/Red Hawk
- Kyōryū Sentai Zyuranger - Geki/Tyranno Ranger
- Gosei Sentai Dairanger - Ryō of the Heavenly Fire Star/Ryu Ranger
- Ultraman Ace - Hokuto Seiji
- Ultraman Taro - Kotarou Higashi, Tadao Nanbara
- Kamen Rider Agito - Makoto Hikawa/Kamen Rider G3, Kaoru Kino/Another Agito
- Kidou Keiji Jiban - Naoto Tamura/Jiban
- Tokkei Winspector - Ryōma Kagawa/Fire
- Seiun Kamen Machineman - Ken Takase/Nick/Machineman

==== Other dubbing ====
- The Lord of the Rings film trilogy - Elrond (Hugo Weaving)
- Shaun of the Dead - Shaun (Simon Pegg)
- Paddle Pop Ad.
- McDonald's Happy Meal Ad.
- Colleen Coloured Pencils Ad.

=== Film ===
- Jon Kub Daeng (จ้อนกับแดง) (1990)
- Just Kids (ลูกตลกตกไม่ไกลต้น) (2006)
