= 9 Cartoon =

- Also known as: Modernine Cartoon (2002-2018)
- Country of origin: Thailand
- Original languages: Thai; Japanese

Production
- Running time: 120 minute

Original release
- Network: 9MCOT HD
- Release: 1980

9 Cartoon (Thai: ช่อง 9 การ์ตูน) (or Modernine Cartoon (โมเดิร์นไนน์การ์ตูน) during the period when the channel was called Modernine TV.) is a Thai anime programming block on air: Saturday to Sunday 7.00AM - 9.30AM (formerly on air 08.30AM - 10.30AM to August 2003, 08.00AM - 10.00AM and 7.00AM - 9.00AM) in television MCOT HD. The first cartoon on air by Tiger Mask in 1981. The show's formerly as children's television was hosted by Nirun Boonyarattaphan from 1980 to 2003, and reformatted in 2015 was hosted by Pat Chonnaphantharak (Patto) and Kitiphat Pimkasemsophon until 2021.

== Current programming ==
| Time | Cartoon (Dubbing Team) | |
| Time | Saturday | Sunday |
|---|---|---|
| 7:00 - 7:30 am. | Beyblade X Season 3 (Cartoon Club) | Jurassic Cops (Cartoon Club) |
| 7:30 - 8:00 am. | No.1 Sentai Gozyuger (Cartoon Club) | Tokumei Sentai Go-Busters (Cartoon Club) |
| 8:00 - 8:30 am. | Pokémon Journeys: The Series (Cartoon Club) | Pokémon Horizons: The Series (Cartoon Club) |
| 8:30 - 9:00 am. | Ninja Hattori-kun Season 5 (Cartoon Club) | |
| 9:00 - 9:30 am. | "Doraemon (2005 TV series)" | |

== Programming ==
| Year | Cartoon |
|---|---|
| 1980–1987 | Tiger Mask; Doraemon; Dr. Slump; Musashi no Ken; The Rose of Versailles; Himitsu no Akko-chan; Magical Princess Minky Momo; Golden Warrior Gold Lightan; Cobra; Astro Boy; Gyakuten! Ippatsuman |
| 1988–1992 | Dragon Ball; Dragon Ball Z; Fist of the North Star; Esper Mami; Magical Emi, the Magic Star; Wing-Man; M.A.S.K.; Lady!!; Space Sheriff Gavan; Japanese Spider-Man; The Mobile Cop Jiban; Special Rescue Police Winspector; Dai Sentai Goggle-V; Sakigake!! Otokojuku; Chōjin Sentai Jetman; Queen Millennia; Galaxy Express 999 |
| 1993 | Jungle Book Shōnen Mowgli; Peach Girl; Idol Angel Yokoso Yoko; Kaiketsu Zorro; My Daddy Long Legs; Kyōryū Sentai Zyuranger; Chōjin Sentai Jetman |
| 1994 | Sailor Moon; City Hunter; Musashi no Ken; Blue Blink; The Pink Panther; ThunderCats; Biker Mice from Mars; Gosei Sentai Dairanger; Mighty Morphin Power Rangers; Jumborg Ace |
| 1995 | YuYu Hakusho; Tales of Little Women; Chimpui; Pokonyan! |
| 1996 | Yaiba; Floral Magician Mary Bell; Ranma ½; Kiteretsu Daihyakka |
| 1997 | Magic Knight Rayearth; Kaiketsu Zorro; Future GPX Cyber Formula; Shippū! Iron Leaguer; Dragon Quest: Dai no Daibōken; Ghost Sweeper Mikami; Matchless Raijin-Oh |
| 1998 | Slam Dunk; Mister Ajikko; Aoki Densetsu Shoot! |
| 1999 | Case Closed; Gundam Wing; Cardcaptor Sakura; Mojacko; Saint Tail; Bakusō Kyōdai Let's & Go!!; Revolutionary Girl Utena |
| 2000 | You're Under Arrest!; Hikarian; Ganba! Fly High |
| 2001 | Pokémon; Digimon Adventure; Dragon Ball GT; Monster Rancher |
| 2002 | Beyblade; Digimon Adventure 02; Ojamajo Doremi; UFO Baby; Zoids; Ojamajo Doremi |
| 2003 | Digimon Tamers; Hunter × Hunter 1999; Mighty Cat Masked Niyandar; Crush Gear Turbo |
| 2004 | Digimon Frontier; Chūka Ichiban; Grander Musashi; Shin Megami Tensei: Devil Children; Chūka Ichiban!; Hanasaka Tenshi Ten-Ten-kun; Inuyasha |
| 2005 | Tokyo Mew Mew; Master Mosquiton '99; Zatch Bell!; Fighting Spirit |
| 2006 | Pretty Cure; The Prince of Tennis; Mirmo! |
| 2007 | Mushiking; Glass Mask; The Law of Ueki; MegaMan NT Warrior |
| 2008 | Powerpuff Girls Z; Beet the Vandel Buster; Bakugan Battle Brawlers; Digimon Data Squad |
| 2009 | Idaten Jump |
| 2010 | Inazuma Eleven; Shōnen Onmyōji |
| 2011 | Tai Chi Chasers; Battle Spirits: Shounen Toppa Bashin; Beyblade: Metal Fusion; Fairy Tail |
| 2012 | SD Gundam Sangokuden Brave Battle Warriors; Saint Seiya: The Lost Canvas; Digimon Fusion |
| 2013 | Toriko; Cardfight!! Vanguard; The Salads; Inazuma Eleven GO |
| 2014 | Saint Seiya Omega; Kung Food; Avatar: The Last Airbender |
| 2015 | Magic Kaito; Godji The Adventure; Kuroko's Basketball |
| 2016 | Yo-Kai Watch; Kuroko's Basketball Season 3; Case Closed Season 13; Dr. Slump Season 4; Sailor Moon Crystal Season 1-2; Doraemon 2005 Season 7-8; Godji the Adventure Season 2; HeartCatch PreCure!; The Kindaichi Case Files Return; Yu-Gi-Oh! Zexal |
| 2017 | Yo-Kai Watch Season 2; Case Closed Season 14-15; Dr. Slump Season 5; Sailor Moon Crystal Season 3; Godji the Adventure Season 3; Miraculous: Tales of Ladybug & Cat Noir; Saint Seiya: Soul of Gold; Suite PreCure; My Little Pony: Friendship Is Magic Season 4; Teenage Mutant Ninja Turtles 2012 Season 1; Q Pootle 5 |
| 2018 | Yo-Kai Watch Season 3; Beyblade Burst; Yu-Gi-Oh! Arc-V; The Kindaichi Case Files Season 2; Smile PreCure!; Tiger Mask W; Pokémon Season 14: Black & White (True); One Piece New World (Cartoon Club) |
| 2019 | Yowamushi Pedal Season 1; Yu-Gi-Oh! Arc-V Season 2; Doraemon 2005 Season 9-10; Free!; Digimon Universe: App Monsters; Kaitou Sentai Lupinranger VS Keisatsu Sentai Patranger (Cartoon Club); Case Closed Season 16; Kamen Rider Zi-O (DEX); Ultraman R/B (DEX) |
| 2020 | Yowamushi Pedal Season 2-4; Doraemon 1979; Ultraman New Generation Chronicle (DEX); Run with the Wind; Doraemon 2005 Season 10 (Catch up started 7 June); Black Clover Season 1 (Cartoon Club); DokiDoki! PreCure; Kamen Rider Zi-O the Movie: Over Quartzer (DEX); Ultraman Taiga (DEX); Kamen Rider Heisei Generations Forever (DEX); Kamen Rider Zero-One (DEX) |
| 2021 | Naruto Season 4 (Started from Episode 169) (Cartoon Club); The Haunted House Season 3 (Cartoon Club); Super Sentai Strongest Battle (Cartoon Club); Ultra Galaxy Fight: New Generation Heroes (DEX); Kishiryu Sentai Ryusoulger (Cartoon Club); Ultra Galaxy Fight: The Absolute Conspiracy (DEX); Ultraman Z (DEX); Case Closed (Re-Run); Doraemon 2005 Season 10 (Catch up started 3 July); Naruto: Shippuden Season 1; Black Clover Season 2; The Haunted House: The Secret of The Ghost Ball; Bakugan Battle Brawlers |
| 2022 | The Haunted House: Birth of Ghost Ball X; Mashin Sentai Kiramager; Naruto: Shippuden Season 2; Demon Slayer: Kimetsu no Yaiba (season 1); Bakugan Battle Brawlers: New Vestroia; Black Clover Season 2 (Start episode 85); Hero Circle / Mushymon Days; Kuroko's Basketball Season 1; Mobile Suit Gundam SEED; The Haunted House: Ghost Ball Double X |
| 2023 | Kikai Sentai Zenkaiger; Black Clover Season 3; Kuroko's Basketball Season 3; Mobile Suit Gundam SEED Destiny; The Haunted House: The Secret of the Cave; The Haunted House: The Sky Goblin VS Jormungandr; Chojin Sentai Jetman; Kuroko's Basketball : WINTER CUP; Infinity Nado; ēlDLIVE; Kamen Rider Decade; Mobile Suit Gundam 00 First Season |
