= Lee Sang-jun (actor) =

South Korean actor (born 1998)

- Born: March 3, 1998 (age 28); South Korea
- Occupation: Actor
- Agent: Double H TNE

Korean name
- Hangul: 이상준
- RR: I Sangjun
- MR: I Sangjun

Lee Sang-jun (Korean: 이상준; born March 3, 1998) is a South Korean actor under Double H TNE. He is best known in Blue Birthday (2021), Beauty and Mr. Romantic and Squid Game 2 (2024).

== Career ==
On May 13, 2021, Lee had signed an exclusive contract with Double H TNE. Lee was selected as the main character for the web series Blue Birthday (2021).

== Filmography ==
=== Television series ===
Year	Title	Role	Ref.
2020–2022	Hero Circle	Vampire Hunter, Chester, Pugnardo, Steve (second voice), Blue, additional voices	
2021	Blue Birthday	Cha Eun-seong	
2021	School 2021	Lee Jae-hyuk	
2024	Beauty and Mr. Romantic	Park Do-jun	
2024	Frankly Speaking	Song Ki-baek (teen)	
2024	Connection	Kim Woo-sung	
2024	Squid Game 2	Pink Soldier Manager	
2025	Heesu in Class 2	Kim Seung-won	
2026	The Legend of Kitchen Soldier	Cha Seung-woo	
2026	Four Hands, Two Sonatas	Yoon Han-rim	
