= List of Pororo the Little Penguin episodes =

This is a list of episodes of the Korean computer-animated television series Pororo the Little Penguin. It has nine seasons.

== Series overview ==
| Season | Episodes | Originally released | |
| Season | Episodes | First released | Last released |
|---|---|---|---|
| 1 | 52 | November 27, 2003 | June 28, 2004 |
| 2 | 52 | December 3, 2005 | May 28, 2006 |
| 3 | 52 | May 4, 2009 | October 27, 2009 |
| 4 | 26 | February 29, 2012 | May 24, 2012 |
| 5 | 26 | February 24, 2014 | May 20, 2014 |
| 6 | 26 | March 2, 2016 | May 26, 2016 |
| 7 | 26 | November 23, 2020 | February 16, 2021 |
| 8 | 26 | August 28, 2023 | November 21, 2023 |
| 9 | 26 | November 26, 2025 | February 19, 2026 |

== Episodes ==
=== Season 1 (2003–04) ===
| Episode no. | Title | Original release date |
|---|---|---|
| 1 | "We're Friends!" | November 27, 2003 |
A little penguin named Pororo lived in a small forest village far in an ice world. While having fun playing in the woods, Pororo finds a mysterious egg. Pororo brings it back to his house to eat it, but the egg starts to crack and a baby dinosaur comes out. Pororo thinks the dinosaur is a monster and runs away.
| 2 | "It's All Right" | November 28, 2003 |
Poby, a kind-hearted polar bear living in the small forest village, invites his friends Pororo, Crong, Eddy, and Loopy to his house. But Pororo breaks Poby's favorite camera while showing off his basketball skills. Seeing how disappointed Poby is, everyone tries to find a way to cheer him up.
| 3 | "Ice Fishing" | December 4, 2003 |
Eddy is a fox and inventor in the small forest village. One day Eddy and his friends go fishing. But being the only one who couldn't catch a fish, Eddy becomes mad at his friends and heads back to his house. Eddy comes back with a sled to show off. All the others want to ride the sled, but because Eddy is still angry of the fishing event, Eddy has the sled all to himself.
| 4 | "Smile, Smile, Smile!" | December 5, 2003 |
Loopy is a lovely little beaver living in the small forest village. One day Loopy finds her friends making a big castle with snow and joins them. Crong throws a ball of snow to Loopy for fun. Thinking that Pororo attacked her with the snowball, Loopy starts a snow fight. But when the snow fight begins to seem more than a play, Loopy starts to cry.
| 5 | "What Happen to My Face?!" | December 11, 2003 |
One day while Pororo was taking a nap, Crong finds some charcoal in the fireplace. Bored playing alone, Crong begins to scribble all over the house, and even on Pororo's face. Loopy comes over and starts laughing at Pororo's face covered with charcoal. Pororo finds out what Crong did and...
| 6 | "Achoo! I Got a Cold" | December 12, 2003 |
Pororo asks Eddy to help clear the tree that fell in front of Loopy's house from the heavy snow that came last night. But Eddy pretends to be sick and stays home reading comic books. Hearing of Eddy's illness, Loopy makes a visit to Eddy's house with her home-made cake only to find that Eddy was faking his illness. Everyone becomes very disappointed in Eddy for pretending to be sick.
| 7 | "Dream of Flying" | December 18, 2003 |
After reading about birds flying, Pororo starts to think that he too can fly. Climbing up a rooftop with great expectations, Pororo finds that his wings are too short to fly. Trying with bigger wings and even Eddy's rocket, Pororo still fails. In attempt to cheer up Pororo, Poby thinks of an idea and takes everyone somewhere... to the sea. Pororo tried to fly from there, but then, he splashes into the sea. Pororo is "flying" in the sea. He feels super happy that it's even better than flying in the sky!
| 8 | "Treasure Hunt" | December 19, 2003 |
One day, Eddy finds an old map. Thinking that the map shows the place where treasures are hidden, Eddy heads off to find the treasure by himself. On his way he meets Pororo and Crong, and tells them that he is off on a treasure hunt. They all go on a search for the treasure.
| 9 | "Who Touched My Snowman?" | 25 December 2003 |
Eddy and Pororo were making a snowman together. Competing over who makes a better snowman, they start fighting. That night a strong wind blows and ruins Eddy's and Pororo's snowman. Next day, Eddy and Pororo find their snowman and suspect each other for ruining each other's snowman...
| 10 | "Crong the Troublemaker" | December 26, 2003 |
One fine day, Pororo was enjoying his reading on a sofa. Crong joined Pororo, but as soon as he found the book interesting, tried to take the book away from Pororo. Annoyed by Crong's behavior, Pororo kicked Crong out of his house. But when it started to snow outside Pororo began to get worried about Crong and headed out to find him...
| 11 | "Let's Play Together" | January 1, 2004 |
| 12 | "Can't I Have the Moon?" | January 2, 2004 |
| 13 | "Eddy's Secret" | January 8, 2004 |
| 14 | "A Magic Flute" | January 9, 2004 |
| 15 | "Snow Canvas" | January 15, 2004 |
| 16 | "Wanna Have a Round?" | January 16, 2004 |
| 17 | "Crong's Christmas" | January 22, 2004 |
| 18 | "Loopy, You Can Do It!" | January 23, 2004 |
| 19 | "Eddy's Telescope" | January 29, 2004 |
| 20 | "The Jigsaw Puzzle" | January 30, 2004 |
| 21 | "Kite-Flying" | February 5, 2004 |
The story begins when Pororo and his friends decide to hold a kite-flying contest to see who can make the highest and most beautiful kite. Each character is very excited and carefully prepares their kite. As the contest starts, all the kites rise into the sky, and everyone is having a great time. However, some problems soon arise. Crong's kite gets stuck in a tree, Eddy's kite loses its string and flies away, and Poby's kite is blown off course by the wind. The characters feel disappointed and worried about the situation. Instead of giving up, the group decides to work together to solve these issues. Pororo and Loopy help Crong retrieve his kite from the tree, while Eddy and Poby search for the lost kite. With help and cooperation, all the problems are gradually resolved. In the end, all the kites are returned to the best condition possible.
| 22 | "Save Loopy!" | February 6, 2004 |
| 23 | "Train Adventure" | February 12, 2004 |
| 24 | "Be Careful!" | February 13, 2004 |
| 25 | "Pororo and the Dandelion" | February 19, 2004 |
| 26 | "Hiccup Cure" | February 20, 2004 |
| 27 | "Pororo Meets with a Whale" | February 26, 2004 |
| 28 | "Magnetic Play" | February 27, 2004 |
| 29 | "Stomach Ache" | March 1, 2004 |
| 30 | "Dancing Together" | March 2, 2004 |
| 31 | "Eddy the Great Inventor" | March 8, 2004 |
| 32 | "To Tell the Truth..." | March 9, 2004 |
| 33 | "Eddy Goes to the Moon" | March 15, 2004 |
| 34 | "Bondon Box" | March 16, 2004 |
| 35 | "A Strange Car" | March 22, 2004 |
| 36 | "Cooking Popcorn" | March 23, 2004 |
| 37 | "Mystical Ghost Light" | March 29, 2004 |
| 38 | "A Surprise Box" | March 30, 2004 |
| 39 | "I Want to Sleep" | April 5, 2004 |
| 40 | "Pororo's Surprise Party!" | April 6, 2004 |
| 41 | "I Am Super Penguin!" | April 12, 2004 |
| 42 | "Sleepless Poby" | April 13, 2004 |
| 43 | "Crong, I'm Sorry" | April 19, 2004 |
| 44 | "Loopy Has a New Friend" | April 20, 2004 |
| 45 | "Lost in Forest" | April 26, 2004 |
| 46 | "Loopy the Fortunteller" | April 27, 2004 |
| 47 | "Eddy's Balloon" | May 3, 2004 |
| 48 | "A Day at Pororo town" | May 4, 2004 |
| 49 | "A Magic Lamp" | May 10, 2004 |
| 50 | "Little Cooks" | May 11, 2004 |
| 51 | "Loopy's Gift" | May 17, 2004 |
| 52 | "A Magic Can" | June 28, 2004 |

=== Season 2 (2005–06) ===
| Episode no. | Title | Original release date |
|---|---|---|
| 53 | "Hello, Friends" | December 3, 2005 |
| 54 | "Petty's House" | December 4, 2005 |
| 55 | "Learning How to Swim" | December 10, 2005 |
| 56 | "Poby the Photographer" | December 11, 2005 |
| 57 | "It's a Dinosaur!" | December 17, 2005 |
| 58 | "Sailing in the Forest" | December 18, 2005 |
| 59 | "My Name is Harry" | December 24, 2005 |
| 60 | "I Love Singing" | December 25, 2005 |
| 61 | "Crong the Great Painter" | December 31, 2005 |
| 62 | "A Pretty Hair Pin" | January 1, 2006 |
| 63 | "I Can Fly" | January 7, 2006 |
| 64 | "I Envy You" | January 8, 2006 |
| 65 | "The Biggest Snowman" | January 14, 2006 |
| 66 | "Petty, You are So Cool!" | January 15, 2006 |
| 67 | "Pororo Shrunk" | January 21, 2006 |
| 68 | "Shark Attack!" | January 22, 2006 |
| 69 | "Crong's First Word" | January 28, 2006 |
| 70 | "Shhh, It is a Secret!" | January 29, 2006 |
| 71 | "Who Did This?" | February 4, 2006 |
| 72 | "The Genius Cook" | February 5, 2006 |
| 73 | "Thanks, Harry!" | February 11, 2006 |
| 74 | "I Am Not a Bed-Wetter!" | February 12, 2006 |
| 75 | "I'm Super Crong" | February 18, 2006 |
| 76 | "Snow White, Loopy" | February 19, 2006 |
| 77 | "Eddy on the Moon" | February 25, 2006 |
| 78 | "Crong Meets with a Seal" | February 26, 2006 |
| 79 | "My Toy Fellas" | March 4, 2006 |
| 80 | "Loopy and Petty" | March 5, 2006 |
| 81 | "Scary Cookies" | March 11, 2006 |
| 82 | "Finding Toy" | March 12, 2006 |
| 83 | "Petty's Secret Friend" | March 18, 2006 |
| 84 | "Don't Do That!" | March 19, 2006 |
| 85 | "No More Troubles!" | March 25, 2006 |
| 86 | "You Are Not Alone" | March 26, 2006 |
| 87 | "Beautiful Color Land" | April 1, 2006 |
| 88 | "Petty Likes Me the Most" | April 2, 2006 |
| 89 | "Harry and Crong Disappeared?" | April 8, 2006 |
| 90 | "Loopy the Magician" | April 9, 2006 |
| 91 | "Friends from Outer Space" | April 15, 2006 |
| 92 | "Snow Ball Ghost" | April 16, 2006 |
| 93 | "The Dragon Comes to Town" | April 22, 2006 |
| 94 | "Good Crong, Bad Crong" | April 23, 2006 |
| 95 | "Pig Pororo" | April 29, 2006 |
| 96 | "A Snowy Day" | April 30, 2006 |
| 97 | "Is Pororo Sick?" | May 6, 2006 |
| 98 | "Do You Need Any Help?" | May 7, 2006 |
| 99 | "A Piece of Cake" | May 13, 2006 |
| 100 | "Robot Cook" | May 14, 2006 |
| 101 | "What's This Smell?" | May 20, 2006 |
| 102 | "Return of Robot Cook" | May 21, 2006 |
| 103 | "Virus is Following Me!" | May 27, 2006 |
| 104 | "Watch Out Pororo!" | May 28, 2006 |

=== Season 3 (2009) ===
| Episode no. | Title | Original release date |
|---|---|---|
| 105 | "Popo and Pipi" | May 4, 2009 |
| 106 | "Everything Looks Amazing" | May 5, 2009 |
| 107 | "Rody is Born" | May 11, 2009 |
| 108 | "Happy Rody" | May 12, 2009 |
| 109 | "Toy Plane" | May 18, 2009 |
| 110 | "Dragon the Magician" | May 19, 2009 |
| 111 | "I Want to Be a Super Hero" | May 25, 2009 |
| 112 | "Mighty Harry" | May 26, 2009 |
| 113 | "Catch the Big fish" | June 1, 2009 |
| 114 | "It's My Toy" | June 2, 2009 |
| 115 | "Princess Loopy" | June 8, 2009 |
| 116 | "Strange Soccer" | June 9, 2009 |
| 117 | "Watch Out, Eddy!" | June 15, 2009 |
| 118 | "Cooking Trouble" | June 16, 2009 |
| 119 | "Clumsy Magician" | June 22, 2009 |
| 120 | "Weather forecast" | June 23, 2009 |
| 121 | "Thanks, Eddy" | June 29, 2009 |
| 122 | "Loopy's Present" | June 30, 2009 |
| 123 | "Play with Crong" | July 6, 2009 |
| 124 | "Flying Poby" | July 7, 2009 |
| 125 | "Petty the Red Riding Hood" | July 13, 2009 |
| 126 | "Baseball Star, Rody" | July 14, 2009 |
| 127 | "Playful Nyao" | July 20, 2009 |
| 128 | "Petty and Nyao" | July 21, 2009 |
| 129 | "Mischievous Wind" | July 27, 2009 |
| 130 | "Poby is Missing" | July 28, 2009 |
| 131 | "Loopy's Doll" | August 3, 2009 |
| 132 | "Singing Passion" | August 4, 2009 |
| 133 | "Amazing Magic Wand" | August 10, 2009 |
| 134 | "You're the Best, Poby" | August 11, 2009 |
| 135 | "Night Wonders" | August 17, 2009 |
| 136 | "Where Did the Ball Go?" | August 18, 2009 |
| 137 | "Toy Frog" | August 24, 2009 |
| 138 | "Scribble Fun" | August 25, 2009 |
| 139 | "Crong and the Shooting Star" | August 31, 2009 |
| 140 | "Got a Cold?" | September 1, 2009 |
| 141 | "Strange Games" | September 7, 2009 |
| 142 | "Best Friends" | September 8, 2009 |
| 143 | "Poby's Birthday" | September 14, 2009 |
| 144 | "Eddy's Song" | September 15, 2009 |
| 145 | "Cloning Machine" | September 21, 2009 |
| 146 | "Cleaning Trouble" | September 22, 2009 |
| 147 | "Strange Adventure 1" | September 28, 2009 |
| 148 | "Strange Adventure 2" | September 29, 2009 |
| 149 | "Sled Race" | October 5, 2009 |
| 150 | "Rody's Dream" | October 6, 2009 |
| 151 | "Magic Potion 1" | October 12, 2009 |
| 152 | "Magic Potion 2" | October 13, 2009 |
| 153 | "Fun Picnic" | October 19, 2009 |
| 154 | "Eddy's Got the Cold" | October 20, 2009 |
| 155 | "Snowy Day" | October 26, 2009 |
| 156 | "Wonderful Playground" | October 27, 2009 |

=== Season 4 (2012) ===
| Episode no. | Title | Original release date |
|---|---|---|
| 157 | "Magical Car, Tu-tu" | February 29, 2012 |
| 158 | "Nice to Meet You Tu-Tu" | March 1, 2012 |
| 159 | "Magical Glasses" | March 7, 2012 |
| 160 | "Gigantic Crong" | March 8, 2012 |
| 161 | "Rescuing Eddy" | March 14, 2012 |
| 162 | "I Want to Be Good at Ice Skating, Too" | March 15, 2012 |
| 163 | "Crong, the Troublemaker" | March 21, 2012 |
| 164 | "Pororo's in Danger" | March 22, 2012 |
| 165 | "Poby Be Nimble !" | March 28, 2012 |
| 166 | "A Sled Race" | March 29, 2012 |
| 167 | "A Day in Porong Porong Forest" | April 4, 2012 |
| 168 | "Loopy's Secret Friend" | April 5, 2012 |
| 169 | "Harry and Summer Island" | April 11, 2012 |
| 170 | "I want to be Good at Sports" | April 12, 2012 |
| 171 | "The Butterfly Forest" | April 18, 2012 |
| 172 | "Crong the Master Cleaner" | April 19, 2012 |
| 173 | "Our Own Superhero Story" | April 25, 2012 |
| 174 | "Poby's Good Luck" | April 26, 2012 |
| 175 | "Crong Goes Number Two" | May 2, 2012 |
| 176 | "Eddy's Christmas Present" | May 3, 2012 |
| 177 | "A Meal Made for Loopy" | May 9, 2012 |
| 178 | "Rody's Wish" | May 10, 2012 |
| 179 | "Transformer Troubles" | May 16, 2012 |
| 180 | "Exchanging Chaos" | May 17, 2012 |
| 181 | "Loopy and Petty's Eventful Night" | May 23, 2012 |
| 182 | "Tu-Tu and Tongtong" | May 24, 2012 |

=== Season 5 (2014) ===
| Episode no. | Title | Original release date |
|---|---|---|
| 183 | "We Are Good Friends" | February 24, 2014 |
| 184 | "Crong's Wish" | February 25, 2014 |
| 185 | "Just Be Honest" | March 3, 2014 |
| 186 | "A Mini Concert for Harry" | March 4, 2014 |
| 187 | "Eddy's Riddle Game" | March 10, 2014 |
| 188 | "Real Courage" | March 11, 2014 |
| 189 | "We Need You, Eddy" | March 17, 2014 |
| 190 | "The Magic Sketchbook" | March 18, 2014 |
| 191 | "Rody's True Friends" | March 24, 2014 |
| 192 | "Eddy's All-Purpose Backpack" | March 25, 2014 |
| 193 | "It's OK to Be a Little Slow" | March 31, 2014 |
| 194 | "Crong Gets Bored" | April 1, 2014 |
| 195 | "Get Well Soon, Loopy" | April 7, 2014 |
| 196 | "Let's Make a New Sled" | April 8, 2014 |
| 197 | "Crong and Harry Have Disappeared" | April 14, 2014 |
| 198 | "Let's Go to Tongtong's House!" | April 15, 2014 |
| 199 | "It's Fun to Play at Home" | April 21, 2014 |
| 200 | "We Want To Go To Space" | April 22, 2014 |
| 201 | "Pororo's Special Present" | April 28, 2014 |
| 202 | "Let's Put on a Play!" | April 29, 2014 |
| 203 | "Dreams Gone Bad" | May 5, 2014 |
| 204 | "A Day with Wall Clock" | May 6, 2014 |
| 205 | "Harry's House Disappeared" | May 12, 2014 |
| 206 | "Petty's Presents" | May 13, 2014 |
| 207 | "Harry and the Magical Spring Water" | May 19, 2014 |
| 208 | "A Group Picture" | May 20, 2014 |

=== Season 6 (2016) ===
| Episode no. | Title | Original release date |
|---|---|---|
| 209 | "We Love You, Rody" | March 2, 2016 |
| 210 | "Crong's Little Friend" | March 3, 2016 |
| 211 | "The Best Birthday Present" | March 9, 2016 |
| 212 | "Wake Up, Princess Petty" | March 10, 2016 |
| 213 | "Loopy's Camping Adventure" | March 16, 2016 |
| 214 | "Pororo, Crong! Please Don't Fight" | March 17, 2016 |
| 215 | "The Adventures on Summer Island 1" | March 23, 2016 |
| 216 | "The Adventures on Summer Island 2" | March 24, 2016 |
| 217 | "A Strange Echo" | March 30, 2016 |
| 218 | "I Don't Like Bad Dreams" | March 31, 2016 |
| 219 | "Pororo the Great Pretender" | April 6, 2016 |
| 220 | "Our Playground" | April 7, 2016 |
| 221 | "We're Sorry, Loopy" | April 13, 2016 |
| 222 | "Eddy's Brave Venture" | April 14, 2016 |
| 223 | "Grumpy Pororo" | April 20, 2016 |
| 224 | "The Porong Porong Talent Show" | April 21, 2016 |
| 225 | "Super Eddy's Super Fiasco" | April 27, 2016 |
| 226 | "Petty, the Great Storyteller" | April 28, 2016 |
| 227 | "Loopy the Nag" | April 4, 2016 |
| 228 | "Our Summer Island Friends Come Visit" | April 5, 2016 |
| 229 | "Let's Go See the Shooting Stars" | April 11, 2016 |
| 230 | "Rody and Tu-tu's Great Adventure" | May 12, 2016 |
| 231 | "Eddy's Trip to the Moon" | May 18, 2016 |
| 232 | "Petty and Harry's Special Cake" | May 19, 2016 |
| 233 | "Please Don't Go, Crong" | May 25, 2016 |
| 234 | "We're Off to See the Wizard" | May 26, 2016 |

=== Season 7 (2020–21) ===
| Episode no. | Title | Original release date |
|---|---|---|
| 235 | "Transformer Robot, Rody" | November 23, 2020 |
| 236 | "Harry Has Become a Giant" | November 24, 2020 |
| 237 | "Petty's Secret Friends" | November 30, 2020 |
| 238 | "Loopy and the Shell" | December 1, 2020 |
| 239 | "The Magic Spell" | December 7, 2020 |
| 240 | "Super Crong's Day" | December 8, 2020 |
| 241 | "I Want to See a Comet" | December 14, 2020 |
| 242 | "Cooking Showdown" | December 15, 2020 |
| 243 | "Eddy's Amazing Cap" | December 21, 2020 |
| 244 | "I Don't Want to Throw It Away" | December 22, 2020 |
| 245 | "A Monster Appeared" | December 28, 2020 |
| 246 | "The Weather Is Weird" | December 29, 2020 |
| 247 | "I Love Bread So Much" | January 4, 2021 |
| 248 | "Friends of the Sea" | January 5, 2021 |
| 249 | "I Want to Be the Best Singer" | January 11, 2021 |
| 250 | "Shark's Song/Sea Sports Festival" | January 12, 2021 |
| 251 | "Loopy Goes to the Sea" | January 18, 2021 |
| 252 | "Where Are You, Crong?" | January 19, 2021 |
| 253 | "What to Do with the Blanket" | January 25, 2021 |
| 254 | "Monster Bustle" | January 26, 2021 |
| 255 | "Mysterious Magic Forest 1" | February 1, 2021 |
| 256 | "Mysterious Magic Forest 2" | February 2, 2021 |
| 257 | "Suspicious dice" | February 8, 2021 |
| 258 | "The Secret of Eddy: King of Inventions" | February 9, 2021 |
| 259 | "Rody of the Night" | February 15, 2021 |
| 260 | "Happy Loopy" | February 16, 2021 |

=== Season 8 (2023) ===
| Episode no. | Title | Original release date |
|---|---|---|
| 261 | "Pororo in Wonderland 1" | August 28, 2023 |
| 262 | "Pororo in Wonderland 2" | 2023 |
| 263 | "A Pirate Appeared" | 2023 |
| 264 | "Crong and the Doll Kpo" | 2023 |
| 265 | "Pororo and Friends’ Day" | 2023 |
| 266 | "Music Box Commotion" | 2023 |
| 267 | "Shark and All-Purpose Phone" | 2023 |
| 268 | "Dance Kingdom Story" | 2023 |
| 269 | "Crong, A Good Boy" | 2023 |
| 270 | "Amazing Underwater Adventure" | 2023 |
| 271 | "Monster in a Dream" | 2023 |
| 272 | "Best Chef Pororo" | 2023 |
| 273 | "Secret Toys" | 2023 |
| 274 | "Commotion in the Sea" | 2023 |
| 275 | "Genius Musician Harry" | 2023 |
| 276 | "Thank You Poby" | 2023 |
| 277 | "I fell on an unfamiliar island" | 2023 |
| 278 | "i lost my Bracelet" | 2023 |
| 279 | "The Promise Of A SUPERHERO" | 2023 |
| 280 | "Tong-Tong’s Magic Wand" | 2023 |
| 281 | "Eddy’s Invention Commotion" | 2023 |
| 282 | "Crong’s Sleigh" | 2023 |
| 283 | "Loopy, Are you okay?" | 2023 |
| 284 | "I’ll take care of you" | 2023 |
| 285 | "my toy is broken" | 2023 |
| 286 | "Loopy’s Birthday" | November 21, 2023 |
