= Yeri (singer) =

South Korean singer and actress (born 1999)

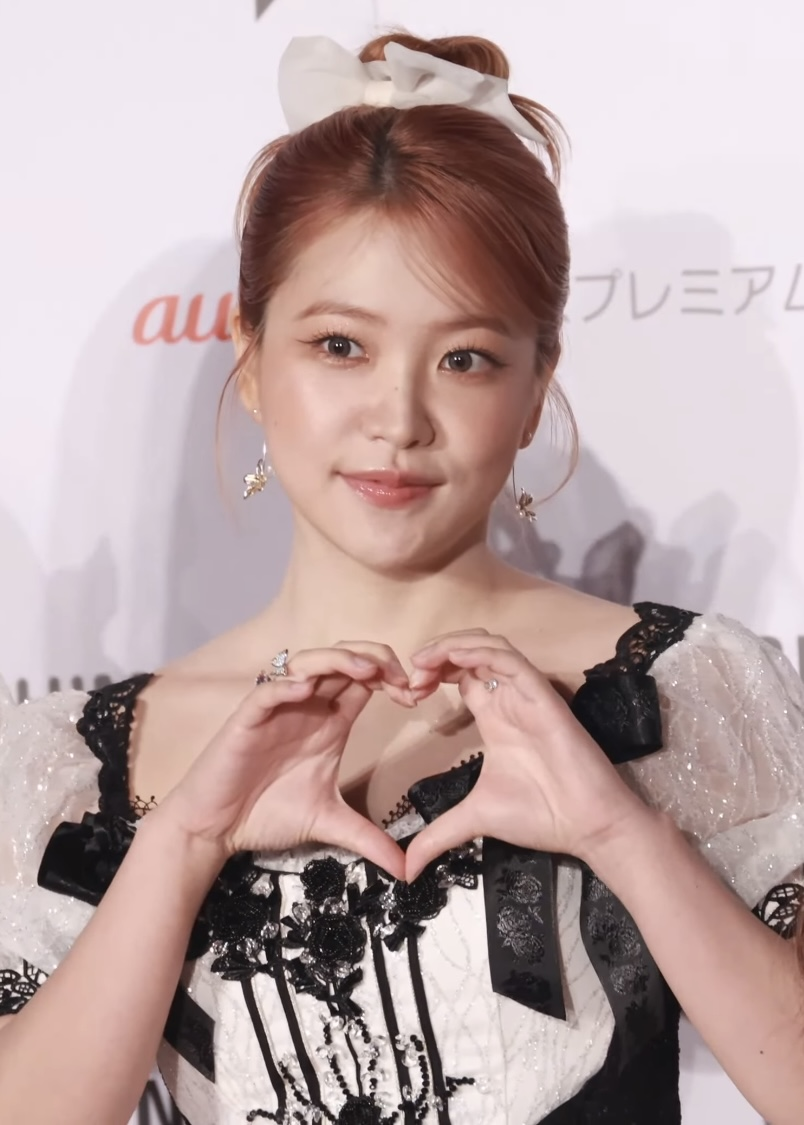
- Yeri in May 2024
- Born: Kim Ye-rim; March 5, 1999 (age 27); Seoul, South Korea
- Education: Hanlim Multi Art School
- Occupations: Singer; actress
- Years active: 2015–present
- Agent: Blitzway
- Musical career
- Genre: K-pop
- Instrument: Vocals
- Label: SM
- Member of: Red Velvet
- Formerly of: SM Rookies

Korean name
- Hangul: 김예림
- RR: Gim Yerim
- MR: Kim Yerim

Stage name
- Hangul: 예리
- RR: Yeri
- MR: Yeri

Signature
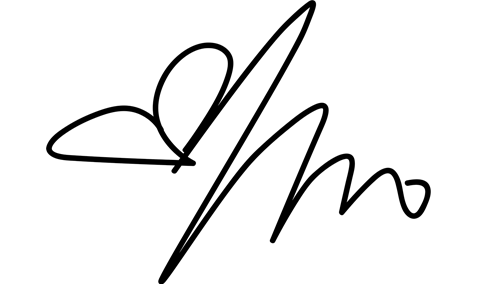

Kim Ye-rim (Korean: 김예림; born March 5, 1999), better known by her stage name Yeri, is a South Korean singer and actress. She is a member of South Korean girl group Red Velvet. She made her acting debut with the drama Blue Birthday. Aside from her music and acting career, Yeri hosted Show! Music Core (2015) and The Viewable SM (2016). Yeri also appeared on variety show Secret Unnie (2018) and Law of the Jungle in Thailand (2019). In 2020, Yeri hosted her first reality-variety show Yeri's Room, which aired through the YouTube channel Dum Dum Studio.

== Early life ==
Kim Ye-rim was born on March 5, 1999, in Seoul, South Korea. She has three younger sisters: Yoo-rim, Ye-eun and Chae-eun. Yeri graduated from Hanlim Multi Art School in 2018.

== Career ==
=== Pre-debut activities ===
Yeri joined SM Entertainment after auditioning at the SM Weekly Audition in 2011. In 2014, she performed as one of the upcoming members of SM Entertainment's pre-debut training team SM Rookies on the SM Town Live World Tour IV. She made a brief appearance in the introduction of Red Velvet's debut song, "Happiness", before debuting as a member in 2015.

=== 2015–present: Red Velvet and solo activities ===
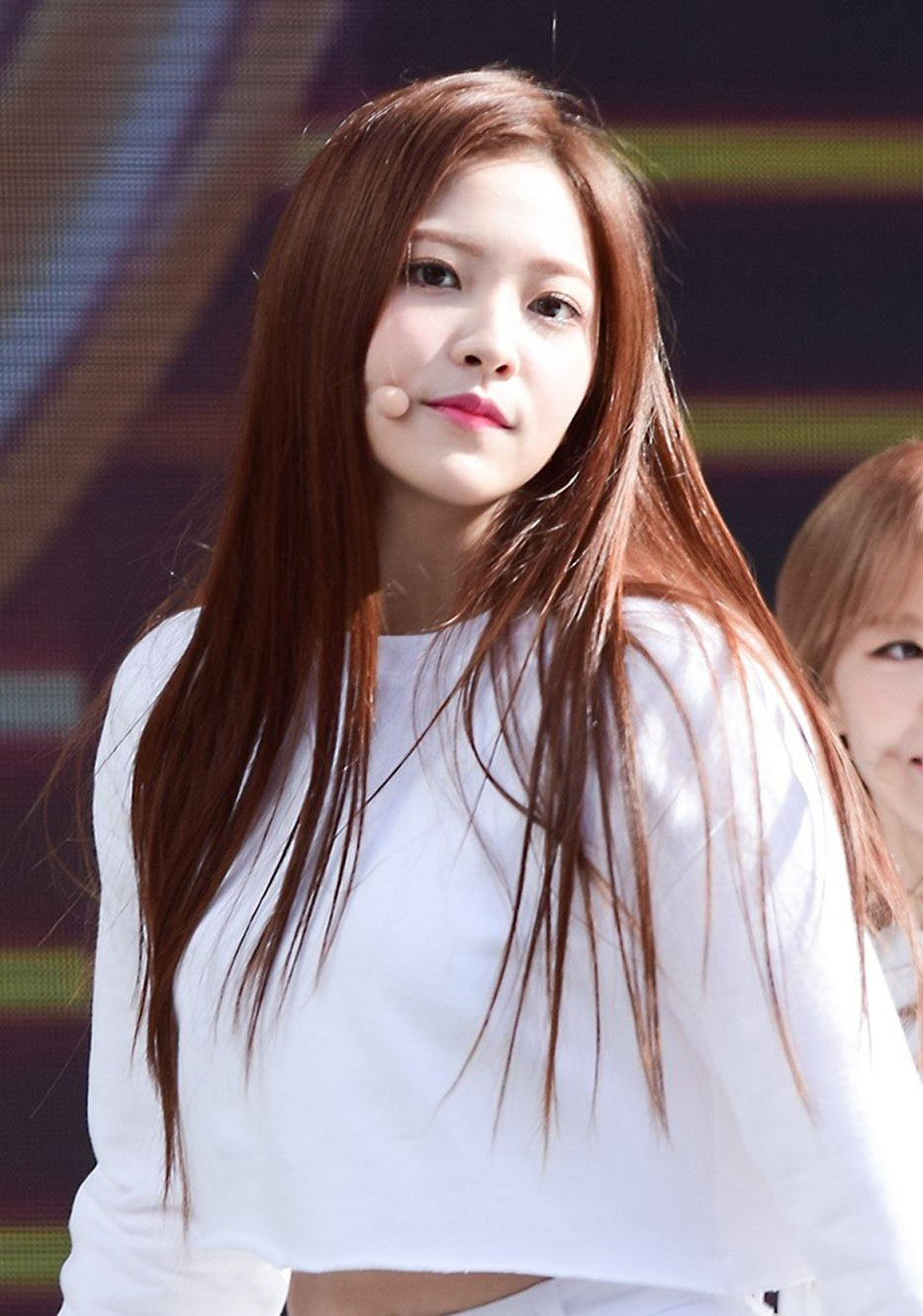
Yeri performing in 2015

Yeri was introduced as a new member of Red Velvet on March 10, 2015, during the promotions of their first extended play (EP) Ice Cream Cake. From May 9 to November 14, Yeri hosted MBC's music program Show! Music Core together with Minho from Shinee and N from VIXX.

In July 2016, Yeri played the female lead in the music video for J-Min and Shim Eun-jee's single "Way Back Home", which was released as part of the project SM Station. In 2016, Yeri became an MC for the SM C&C web-variety program The Viewable SM together with Leeteuk.

In December 2017, singer Ragoon released his EP Talking, whose lead single "Story" was co-written by Yeri.

In April 2018, Yeri was confirmed as part of the cast of JTBC's new variety show Secret Unnie together with Han Chae-young. On December 13, Yeri, together with NCT's Renjun, Jeno and Jaemin, took part in the third season SM Station. They released the official Korean soundtrack version of "Hair in the Air" from the television series Trolls: The Beat Goes On!.

On March 14, 2019, the music video for Yeri's first self-composed solo project "Dear Diary" was released as a part of SM Station Season 3. The same month, Yeri was confirmed as part of the cast of Law of the Jungle in Thailand. In May, she featured in South Korean rapper Giant Pink's song "Tuesday is better than Monday".

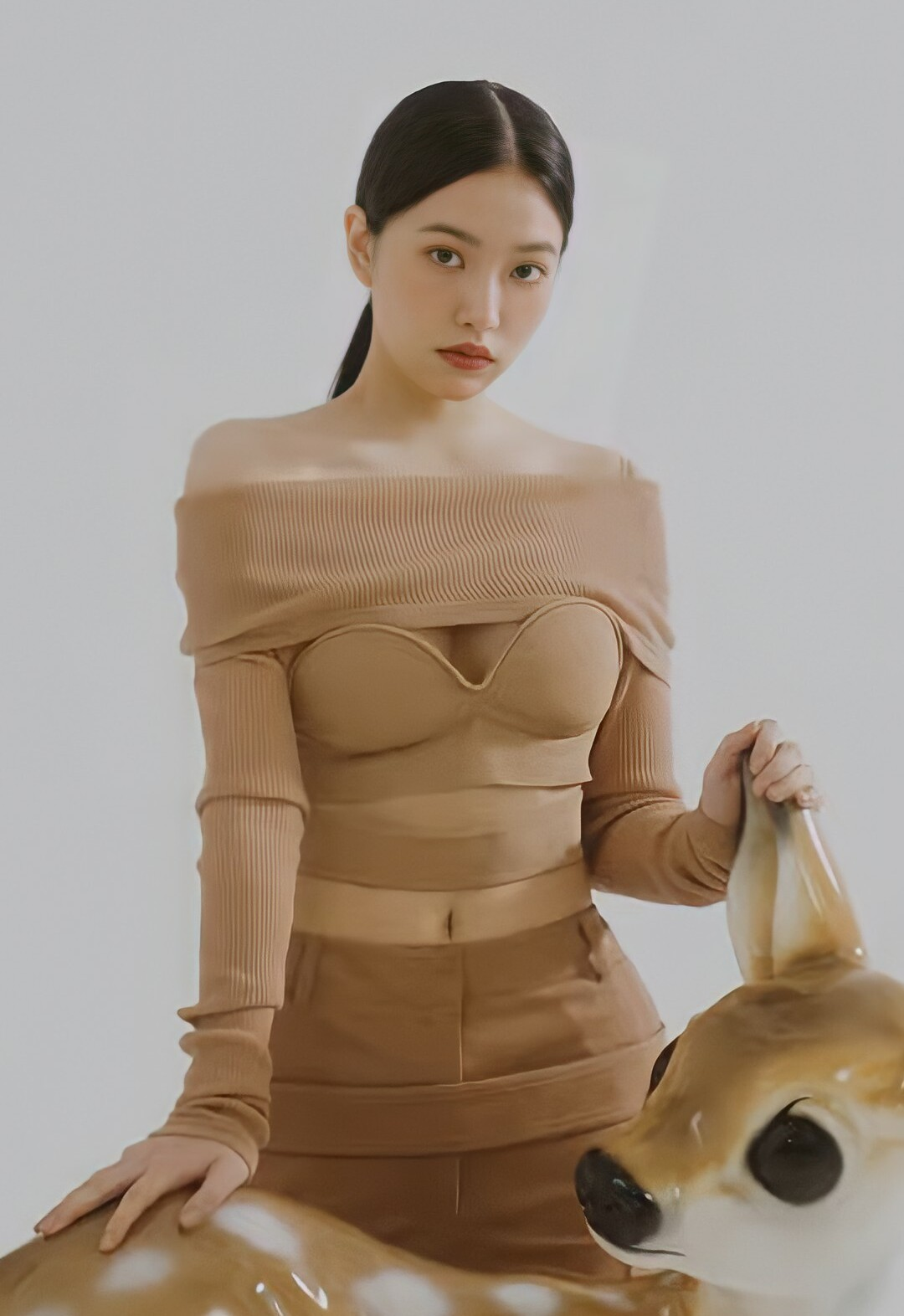
Yeri for Marie Claire Korea in 2022

On June 8, 2020, the first episode of Yeri's reality-variety show Yeri's Room aired on the YouTube channel Dum Dum Studio. New episodes premiered every Monday and Wednesday, with special clips uploaded every Friday. The guest in the first episode was Twice member Nayeon. On July 24, Yeri participated in the NCSOFT Fever 2020 Cool Summer Project and released a remake of "Woman On The Beach" by Cool as a collaboration with AB6IX Jeon Woong and Ravi. On August 7, the third song remake in the project, "Sorrow", was released. Yeri appeared in the music video along with Ravi and Kim Woo-seok.

In February 2021, Yeri was cast in tvN's one-act drama Drama Stage in the episode "Mint Condition". On April 7, Yeri was cast as female lead of the web series Blue Birthday. In May 2023, Yeri was cast as female lead on Wavve web series Bitch X Rich. On April 4, 2025, SM Entertainment announced that its exclusive contract with Yeri had ended, but she will remain in Red Velvet and be involved in all future group activities. On May 1, Yeri signed a contract with Blitzway Entertainment as an actress.

== Other ventures ==
=== Endorsements ===
Aside from endorsements with Red Velvet, in January 2020, Yeri released her own lipstick collection with make-up brand Notre Colette. In July 2020, AprilSkin Korea announced Yeri as their new exclusive brand model, noting that they selected Yeri for her "sensuous and trendy image" that matched well with their brand concept.

=== Philanthropy ===
In February 2020, Yeri donated 10 million won to the Community Chest of Korea to help support those affected by the COVID-19 pandemic in South Korea. On March 5, 2021, Yeri donated 10 million won to Jusarang Community's Baby Box to help single-mother families and "baby box" infants.

== Discography ==
=== Singles ===
List of singles, showing year released, selected peak positions, sales figures, and name of the album
Title	Year	Peak chart positions	Album
Title	Year	KOR	Album
As lead artist
"Dear Diary" (스물에게)	2019	200	SM Station Season 3
As featured artist
"Tuesday is better than Monday" (Giant Pink featuring Yeri)	2019	—	Non-album singles
"Your Warmth" (너의 온기가 되어줄게) (Babylon featuring Yeri)	2019	— (Note: "Your Warmth" did not enter the Gaon Digital Chart, but peaked at number 89 on the Gaon BGM chart.)	Non-album singles
Collaborations
"Hair in the Air" (with NCT's Renjun, Jeno and Jaemin)	2018	—	SM Station Season 3
"Woman on the Beach" (해변의 여인) (with Ravi and AB6IX's Jeon Woong)	2020	—	Fever Music 2020 - Cool Summer Project
"Sorrow" (애상) (with (with Ravi and Kim Wooseok)	2020	— (Note: "Sorrow" did not enter the Gaon Digital Chart, but peaked at number 69 on the Gaon BGM chart.)	Fever Music 2020 - Cool Summer Project
"Snow Dream 2021" (with Chenle, Haechan, Jisung, Ningning)	2021	— (Note: "Snow Dream 2021" did not enter the Gaon Digital Chart, but peaked at position 83 on the Gaon Download Chart.)	2021 Winter SM Town: SMCU Express
"Nap Fairy" (낮잠) (with Sam Kim)	2022	— (Note: "Nap Fairy" did not enter the Gaon Digital Chart, but peaked at number 50 and 74 on the Gaon BGM Chart and the Gaon Download Chart, respectively.)	SM Station Season 4
Soundtrack appearances
"It's You (Yeri ver.)"	2021	— (Note: "It's You (Yeri ver.)" did not enter the Gaon Digital Chart, but peaked at position 157 on the Gaon Download Chart.)	Blue Birthday OST Part 4
"—" denotes releases that did not chart or were not released in that region.

=== Composition credits ===
All song credits are adapted from the Korea Music Copyright Association's database, unless otherwise noted.

Name of the song, year released, artist, and name of the album
Year	Artist	Song	Album	Lyricist		Composition		Ref
Year	Artist	Song	Album	Credited	With	Credited	With	Ref
2017	Ragoon	"Story" (이야기)	sTalking	Yes	Ragoon	Yes	Ragoon, No.K	—N/a
2019	Herself	"Dear Diary" (스물에게)	SM Station Season 3	Yes	–	Yes	MonoTree	—N/a
2019	Ellie Goulding, Diplo & Red Velvet	"Close To Me (Red Velvet Remix)"	Brightest Blue Japanese Ver	Yes	Wendy	No	–	
2019	Babylon & Yeri	"Your Warmth" (너의 온기가 되어줄게)	Non-album single	Yes	Babylon	Yes	Babylon, Jung So-ri	

== Videography ==
=== Music videos ===
Title	Year	Ref.
"Dear Diary"	2020	
Collaborations
"Hair in the Air" (with NCT's Renjun, Jeno and Jaemin)	2018	
"Sorrow" (with Ravi and Kim Wooseok)	2019	
"Nap Fairy" (with Sam Kim)	2022	
As featured artist
"Tuesday is better than Monday" (Giant Pink feat. Yeri)	2019	

== Filmography ==
Key
†	Denotes films that have not yet been released

=== Film ===
Year	Title	Role	Notes	Ref.
2015	SMTown: The Stage	Herself	Documentary film of SM Town	
2020	Trolls World Tour	Kim-Petit	Animated film	
2022	Blue Birthday	Oh Ha-rin	New edited version and add never-before-seen scenes	
2025	The Ghost Game	Park Ja-young		

=== Television series ===
Year	Title	Role	Notes	Ref.
2016	Descendants of the Sun	Herself	Cameo (Episode 16)	
2021	Drama Stage: "Mint Condition"	Hong Chae-ri	One-act drama	
2023	Applause	Eun-seo	One-act drama	
2026	Azure Spring	An-na	Lead role	
2026	Insiders †			

=== Web series ===
Year	Title	Role	Notes	Ref.
2021	Blue Birthday	Oh Ha-rin		
2023–2025	Bitch x Rich	Baek Je-na	Season 1–2	

=== Television shows ===
Year	Title	Role	Notes	Ref.
2015	Show! Music Core	Co-host	With Minho and N	
2018	Secret Unnie	Cast member	With Han Chae-young	
2019	Law of the Jungle in Thailand	Cast member	Episode 368–372	

=== Web shows ===
Year	Title	Role	Notes	Ref.
2016	The Viewable SM	Host	Web-variety	
2020	Yeri's Room	Host	Web-variety, talk show Dum Dum Studio's channel	

== Awards and nominations ==
Name of the award ceremony, year presented, category, nominee(s) of the award, and the result of the nomination
Award ceremony	Year	Category	Nominee(s)/work(s)	Result	Ref.
APAN Star Awards	2023	Excellence Award – Actress in a Webseries	Bitch X Rich	Won	
Brand Customer Loyalty Awards	2023	Best Female Idol – Actor	Herself	Won	
