= Dear Diary (Yeri song) =

2019 single by Yeri

Single by Yeri
- Language: Korean
- Released: March 14, 2019
- Studio: doobdoob Studio; SM Blue Cup Studio
- Genre: Acoustic ballad
- Length: 3:39
- Label: SM; Dreamus
- Composer(s): Yeri; Son Go-eun
- Lyricist(s): Yeri

Music video
- "Dear Diary" on YouTube

"Dear Diary" (Korean: 스물에게; RR: Seumulege; lit. Dear Twenty) is a song recorded by South Korean singer and Red Velvet member Yeri. The track was released digitally on March 14, 2019, by SM Entertainment as part of the third season of SM Station. Composed and was also written by her along with Son Go-eun, the track expresses sympathy with support and gratitude expressed to her twenties. The song debuted and peaked at position 200 on South Korea's Gaon Digital Chart.

== Background and composition ==
On May 11, 2018, Yeri appeared on Secret Unnie with Han Chae-young and performed "Dear Diary". It was then revealed that the Red Velvet member will be releasing her own song. A year later, SM Entertainment announced that she will be releasing the track at 6:00 PM on March 14, 2019. The song will be released digitally on various music platforms as part of the third season of SM Station.

"Dear Diary"
"Dear Diary" is a medium tempo acoustic ballad song that expresses sympathy with the support and gratitude expressed to her twenties.

"Dear Diary" composed by Yeri and was also written by her along with Son Go-eun. Musically, the song was described as a medium tempo acoustic ballad with "sweet" guitar and electric piano. It is noted her "calm" voice as an expression of her appreciation of her first step as an adult. The track is composed in the key of C major with a tempo of 172 beats per minute. Lyrically, it expresses sympathy with the support and gratitude expressed to her twenties. Yeri revealed that she had heard a lot of questions about what would be the most different when she will be 20 years old. It was declared that she started to write it and described the song as "vague and anxious". Additionally, she told that she was still "clumsy" but have learned how to take care of oneself as she have gone through a special and strange time of twenties.

== Promotion and reception ==
The accompanying music video for "Dear Diary" was directed by video director Sunghwi. It was premiered on March 14, 2019, to coincide with the release of the song. Prior to its premiere date, the music video was teased with one teaser. The music video consists of Yeri sending a video letter to her 20-year-old self. The track debuted at position 200 on the 11th weekly issue of South Korea's Gaon Digital Chart for 2019 during the period dated March 10–16. The song also debuted at position 62 on the component Gaon Download Chart.

== Track listing ==
- Digital download / streaming
1. "Dear Diary" – 3:39
2. "Dear Diary (Instrumental)" – 3:39

== Credits and personnel ==
Credits adapted from Melon.

Studio

- Recorded at doobdoob Studio
- Recorded at SM Blue Cup Studio
- Edited at MonoTree Studio
- Engineered for mix at SM Big Shot Studio
- Mixed at SM Yellow Tail Studio
- Mastered at 821 Sound Mastering

Personnel

- Yeri – vocals, vocal directing
- Son Go-eun – composition, arrangement, vocal directing, keyboard, Pro Tools operation, digital editing
- Yoo Young-jin – music and sound supervision, background vocals
- Lee Byung-woo – guitar
- Kwon Won-jin – recording
- Jeong Eui-seok – recording
- Lee Min-kyu – mixing engineer
- Koo Jong-pil – mixing
- Kwon Nam-woo – mastering

== Charts ==
Weekly chart performance for "Dear Diary"
Chart (2019)	Peak position
South Korea (Gaon)	200

== Release history ==
Release dates and formats for "Dear Diary"
Region	Date	Format(s)	Label(s)	Ref.
Various	March 14, 2019	Digital download; streaming	SM Entertainment; Dreamus	
