= Mighty Cat Masked Niyander =

Japanese anime television series

- ニャニがニャンだー ニャンダーかめん
- Genre: Action, Adventure, Comedy
- Created by: Takashi Yanase
- Developed by: Masaaki Sakurai
- Directed by: Tsutomu Shibayama (chief); Tomoko Iwasaki
- Music by: Kazuaki Miyaji
- Country of origin: Japan
- Original language: Japanese
- No. of episodes: 83 (139 segments)

Production
- Producers: Masamitsu Oita (Nagoya TV); Jun Haraguchi (Nagoya TV); Asami Ohara (Tokyu Agency); Toru Hasegawa (Sunrise); Arata Sasaki (Sunrise)
- Production companies: Nagoya TV; Tokyu Agency; Sunrise (Note: Production assistance (制作協力) for all episodes were provided by Asahi Production and Ajiado.)

Original release
- Network: ANN (Nagoya TV, TV Asahi)
- Release: February 6, 2000 – September 30, 2001

Mighty Cat Masked Niyander (Japanese: ニャニがニャンだー ニャンダーかめん, Hepburn: Nyani ga nyandā Nyandā Kamen) is a Japanese superhero magical boy anime series produced by Sunrise, loosely based on children's book of the same name by author Takashi Yanase. It is directed by Tsutomu Shibayama and written by Masaaki Sakurai and Takashi Yanase. It aired on Nagoya Broadcasting Network, TV Asahi and its affiliates from February 6, 2000, to September 30, 2001, with a total of 83 episodes.

An English dub and Hindi dub of the anime aired on Nickelodeon India.

== Story ==
Follows the story of Nyago, a sweet and cute young cat living in Cat Town, who is chosen to hold the secret identity of Mighty Cat Masked Niyander, a superhero who saves and helps people of Cat Town. He is kind and truthful at heart and is loved by all, but due to this, he has many rivals.

== Characters ==
=== Main ===
Nyago/Masked Niyander

Voiced by: Mayumi Asano (Japanese)

The main character, but is actually a young cat who is still an elementary school student. He is a little dull in studies and sports, but as he is caring, cute, kind-hearted, sweet, and understanding, the Cat Wizard chooses him to be Niyander and help the people who are in trouble. During his transformation into Niyander, his whiskers and tail disappear. His eyes change. He is always ready to help anyone in trouble, no matter who it is. Niyander even helps those who are his enemies when they call for help. Nyago dislikes capsicums and caterpillars even after becoming Niyander. He is the true holder of the magic sword.

Miko/Junior Niyander

Voiced by: Taeko Kawata (eps 1–13), Mika Kanai (eps 14–83)

Nyago's little sister, and very cute. She loves her older brother very much, though she is sometimes strict with him, and wants him to be like Niyander (She does not know at first that her brother himself is Niyander). She, like many other people, likes Niyander very much, but is stunned to discover later that her own brother is Niyander. But she gets over it and requests the Cat Wizard to let her help people. He refuses to do so at first, but at last he makes Miko 'Junior Niyander' to assist Niyander hence.

Pidori

Voiced by: Noriko Suzuki

A brave pterodactyl, and Nyago's closest and most faithful friend. He was raised by Nyago since his birth. Pidori is Niyander's partner in helping people too. In case Nyago is far away from his home or has not got his bag (where he keeps his Niyander costume), Pidori brings it to him. But he can only say 'Pi!' though Nyago understands him.

Niyon

Voiced by: Kenyu Horiuchi

A blue, mountain cat. He thinks he is a famous hero, but he is not. He has strong traces of honor and greed in his character, but slowly becomes a popular person in Cat Town due to his variety of attempts to become famous. But although his self-centered personality is selfishness, he also has a good and friendly nature. He has no hesitation in helping people when he can and doing good deeds. In appearance he does not look much like a cat and has a fine moustache, but earlier he had the appearance of a wild and ferocious mountain cat. Niyon is excellent in inventing things, and he has a machine called the 'Super Niyon Helicopter' which runs on waste materials. He wants be in the first rank by outshining Niyander, but it happens only in the final episode. He is blue in color and is shown to like rap rock. He lives in a tree like house with Con in the forest.

Con

Voiced by: Ai Uchikawa

An anthropomorphic white fox, very gentle and soft-spoken. She likes Niyon so she faithfully assists him in all his work. In many episodes it is shown that she loves him and she will become future wife of Niyon. She is convinced that Niyon is the best, and calls him 'Niyon sir'. She is always quick in sympathizing with Niyon in his failures. She also makes food for him and do all the house work. Although Niyon often doesn't care about her but also he can't live without her and totally depends on her for everything and starts thought care whenever she goes far from him. In order to increase Niyon's popularity, she consults Ginko her friend for advice. But she is a little impatient sometimes.

=== Secondary ===
Ginko

Voiced by: Yuko Kobayashi

She is an otter, clever and helpful. She comforts Con whenever she is worried about Niyon. She also has a special ability, which is that she can hit her enemies or someone with a wink punch which causes weakness when it hits, but it does not work on children.

Sarakichi

Voiced by: Dan Tomoyuki

He is a Kappa, and Ginko's assistant. He has a set of plate disks on his head which he can use as a 'flying disk' weapon. But if it is taken away, or if he stays without water for a long time, he becomes unwell. He is a very good swimmer.

Nyanta

Voiced by: Ayumi Kita

He is the leader of Nyago's group of friends. He likes sports. He wants to become like Masked Niyander when he grows up. He teases Niyon saying that he is a fool to think that he is popular. Nyanta is an orange cat with stripes, a little plump, loves belly rubs and he has protruding teeth.

Nyako

Voiced by: Aya Yamakawa [ja]

She is a pretty girl of Nyago's class, and one of Nyago's friends. She too likes Niyander very much. She is very neat and tidy, and also very friendly. She is the tallest in her class. She is very good at dancing and singing. Nyako has pretty green eyes, and is white in color except for a dark grey patch on her head and tail.

Kachin

Voiced by: Kumi Yamakado [ja]

The cleverest cat in Nyago's class, and very patient. She wears glasses and large white coat and has her own laboratory at a shed beside her house. She wants to invent something to help people, like Niyander. She is grey in color, and her coat sleeves cover up her arms.

Suzuko Teacher

Voiced by: Yuko Kobayashi

She is Nyago's class teacher. Nyago gives many excuses to go out during the class so that he can transform into Niyander, but even though she is puzzled, she is generous enough to let Nyago have his way. Her childhood classmates are Kazaru, Pichiko and Kaberina.

HeHe Manto

Voiced by: Shinpachi Tsuji [ja]

He lives on a mountain at the edge of Niyon woods. He thinks that he is the king of Cat town, and often challenges Niyander. Unlike Niyon, he does not hesitate to be violent. But he is not a villain. His special ability is to create and throw fireballs and lightning from his mouth. He dislikes shallots. He has a collection of flying cloaks, and always wears a black cloak himself.

Spider Cat/Kumoneko

Voiced by: Kikumi Umeda [ja]

Spider Cat is HeHe Manto's servant and can weave sticky threads and webs which can trap people. He also weaves cloth for HeHe Manto's flying cloaks. He can only says 'Kumo!'

=== Recurring ===
Tama

Voiced by: Yuko Kobayashi

She is also one of Nyago's classmates. She is very sober and docile, and is quite a hard working person. She likes Nyago because of his good qualities. Tama is also a friend of Niyander.

Charmin

Voiced by: Teiyu Ichiryusai

She is Nyago's classmate. She is fat but strong and good in sports, and has a big nose.

Cat wizard

Voiced by: Yuzuru Fujimoto

He is the one who gave Nyago the mission of to help people in trouble and maintain peace. He wants to save the world from chaos, destruction, and the evil. He chooses Nyago to help him as Nyago is unselfish and down-to-earth. He first makes him Masked Niyander, and then later makes Miko Junior Niyander.

Tanuko

Voiced by: Yuko Kobayashi

She is a raccoon dog, and is very cunning. She helps her older brother HeHe Manto just like Con helps Niyon. She likes teasing Niyon and putting him into trouble. Because of this, she and Con are rivals.

Dokuro/Skull King

Voiced by: Kazuhiro Nakata, Rokuro Naya

He is a villain and truly evil. He is very much tempted to unmask Niyander. He wants to conquer the world and make it barren and desolated. Assisted by his monster minions and skull servants, he attempts to do so several times. As he is all bones, he can rejoin his parts even after getting scattered. He tries to possess the treasure sword but in vain. He was once defeated by Niyander and his friends. However he manages to undo the curse and started trying to conquer the power of the four magic balls. But he is trapped by these balls for good.

Chietama

Voiced by: Roco Takizawa [ja]

He looks like an egg with two feet. He is actually the caretaker of the four magic balls. He is brave and clever and usually responsible. His name is mistaken to be 'Chibitama' by the Skull King several times, much to his annoyance. He admires Niyander a lot.

Mouse wizard

Voiced by: Dan Tomoyuki

He is the leader of a group of mice known as the Chu Chu Clan. He appears towards the end of the story. He attempts to turn Cat Town into Chu Chu Town as per the common principle "cats are the natural enemies of mice." Together with his mouse friends, he uses various tactics to make life of the residents of Cat Town difficult. This earns him the wrath of the residents of Cat Town. Later in the final episode, after being defeated by Niyander he reconciles with the residents of Cat Town and decides to build Chu Chu Town near Cat Town.

Ultra Maru/Miraemaru

Voiced by: Cho

He is a tiger, and is fond of eating and drinking. Although at first he sets out to outshine Niyander, he later befriends him. He believes in justice and hence helps people in trouble whenever he can, just like Niyander. To do so he wraps himself in bandages like a mummy to hide his identity, and becomes Miraemaru.

Mr. Mike

Voiced by: Yutaka Aoyama

He is an active reporter of Cat Town's main television channel, or Kamen channel. He has been a movie director too. He is in charge of several other TV programs and announces popularity rankings on a daily basis.

Kazaru

Voiced by: Miyuki Ichijo

She is a fashion designer. She is a bit dramatic at times, and has strong friendship with Pichiko and Kaberina.

Kabarina

Voiced by: Noriko Suzuki

She is a pink hippo. She is a very good ballet dancer and also teaches ballet. She lives in a small house on a lake. As she is very heavy, the ground shakes when she stamps too hard.

Pichiko

Voiced by: Roco Takizawa

She is a slender bird. Her voice is usually too high pitched and she does not sing very well. But she plays the piano and the violin excellently.

Pepe penguin

Voiced by: Miyuki Ichijo

He wants to become a master at riddles. For this he becomes a student of Dr.Hoho. Although he is a penguin he is sensitive and hates cold weather. He easily becomes ill when he undergoes panic, excitement or temperature change. He is usually silly, but has good ideas at times.

Pepeko

Voiced by: Yumi Takada

She is the little sister of Pepe penguin. She is calm and gentle. She cares for her brother just like Miko cares for Nyago.

Dr. Hoho

Voiced by: Hiroshi Naka

He is an elderly owl, and like all of them, very wise. He is good at riddles and providing any sort of information. He is extremely fond of melons.

Puu

A cyan-colored lizard who is in a relationship with a pink lizard named Owari. He has the ability to puff up his body and shoot gusts of air projectiles. He sees Sarakichi as his rival for Owari's affection.

Dekakongu

Voiced by: Yutaka Aoyama

A huge gorilla who lives in Niyon Woods. He sometimes causes uproar due to his size, but is kind-hearted and friendly.

Chibikongu

A friend of Dekakongu, and is very much like him in appearance, only smaller.

Gaeon

Voiced by: Nobuyuki Furuta [ja]

He is a strong mountain dog who likes to travel far and wide. Due to this he is famous and therefore is a rival of Niyon. He has a good character.

Wonta

Voiced by: Noriko Suzuki

He is a young admirer of Gaeon. He is brave and loyal and wants to accompany Gaeon on his travels. He is a good friend of Con.

Paka Paka Kid

Voiced by: Kouji Ochiai, Shoto Kashii [ja]

He is a cowboy horse, runs very fast and has an accurate aim. He befriends Gaeon later.

Kaako

Voiced by: Sayuri Sadaoka

An old woman who runs a broom shop. She is a sort of good witch. She is the only one besides the Cat Wizard who knows that Niyander and Junior Niyander are Nyago and Miko. She has her own set of brooms which can come alive and are her friends.

Ninja Harry

Voiced by: Makoto Tsumura

He is a hedgehog. He has all the qualities of a ninja. He is a bit cocky and impatient at times, but a good person all the same.

Demonga

Voiced by: Yuki Masuda

He is a Ninja too. He is calm and clever compared to Harry. He was suspected to be a criminal at first but later proves that he was not and becomes a good friend of Niyander.

Narrator

Voiced by: Teiyu Ichiryusai

An unknown named female narrator who narrates the stories of each episodes in storytelling format.

== Music ==
=== Opening themes ===
1. Yume no Manto (Ep. 1 – 83/all)

=== Ending themes ===
1. kokoro no Mori de (Ep. 1 – 32/54 segments)
2. Dance DE Niyan (Ep. 33 – 83/85 segments)

== Broadcast ==
Country	Title	Network	Date
Japan	ニャニがニャンだー ニャンダーかめん (Nyani ga nyanda nyandā kamen)	Nagoya Broadcasting Network	February 6, 2000 – September 30, 2001
Japan	ニャニがニャンだー ニャンダーかめん (Nyani ga nyanda nyandā kamen)	TV Asahi	February 6, 2000 – September 30, 2001
Japan	ニャニがニャンだー ニャンダーかめん (Nyani ga nyanda nyandā kamen)	Tochigi TV	2004 – unknown May 18, 2018 – unknown
Japan	ニャニがニャンだー ニャンダーかめん (Nyani ga nyanda nyandā kamen)	Disney XD	2010
Japan	ニャニがニャンだー ニャンダーかめん (Nyani ga nyanda nyandā kamen)	Animax	February 2, 2015 – March 20, 2016
Japan	ニャニがニャンだー ニャンダーかめん (Nyani ga nyanda nyandā kamen)	Chiba Television Broadcasting	April 23, 2018 – October 2018
Japan	ニャニがニャンだー ニャンダーかめん (Nyani ga nyanda nyandā kamen)	Kyoto Broadcasting System	July 2, 2018 – August 2020
Hong Kong	幪面貓俠 (Méng miàn māo xiá)	TVB Kids	2002
Thailand	หน้ากากเนียนด้า เหมียวจอมซ่า (Nâagaagànĭandâa Mĭeowjomsâa)	Modern Nine TV (as part of Modernine Cartoon)	November 16, 2003 – April 3, 2004; September 4, 2005 – January 29, 2006
South Korea	난다 난다 니얀다 (Nanda Nanda Niyanda)	JEI TV	December 20, 2004 – 2007
South Korea	난다 난다 니얀다 (Nanda Nanda Niyanda)	Cartoon Network	2010–2012; May 6, 2013 – May 20, 2013
Italy	Super Niyandar, il gatto mascherato	Rai 2	June 23, 2008 – unknown
India	Mighty Cat Masked Niyander (a.k.a. Mighty Cat Masked Niyandar)	Nickelodeon	October 2008 – 2009
India	Mighty Cat Masked Niyander (a.k.a. Mighty Cat Masked Niyandar)	Nickelodeon Sonic	October 5, 2015 – unknown December 27, 2017 – May 21, 2018
Taiwan	科學小飛喵 (Kēxué xiǎo fēi miāo)	YoYo TV	2003
Taiwan	科學小飛喵 (Kēxué xiǎo fēi miāo)	Momo Kids	Unknown
