= Um Sang-hyun =

South Korean voice actor (born 1971)

- 엄상현
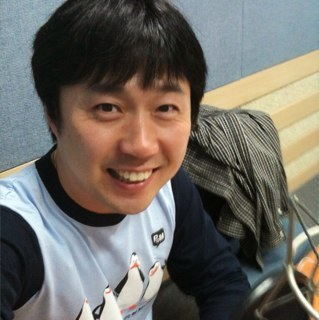
- Um in 2010
- Born: 엄상현; December 29, 1971 (age 54)
- Other names: Sang-hyun-son; Um-oppa/hyung; Luke/Luke Um
- Education: Chung-Ang University; Theatre and Film
- Occupation: Voice actor
- Years active: 1998–present

Korean name
- Hangul: 엄상현
- Hanja: 嚴祥鉉
- RR: Eom Sanghyeon
- MR: Ŏm Sanghyŏn
- Website: Official fan club (in Korean); Official Twitter

Um Sang-hyun (Korean: 엄상현; born December 29, 1971) is a South Korean voice actor who began his career by joining Educational Broadcasting System's voice acting division in 1998.

Before making his debut as a voice actor, he used to work in theaters, including performing his roles as a Japanese assassinator and a royal servant in a 1997 South Korean musical The Last Empress and working as the assistant director for South Korean musicals Gaeddongi and Moskito< the same year. In 1992, he also appeared in a South Korean independent film called Opening the Closed School Gates.

After his exclusive work at EBS, Um has been a freelancer since 2001. In the early 2000s, he came to prominence after voicing Kira Yamato on the Korean dub of Mobile Suit Gundam SEED. Since then, Um has dubbed a number of television animation series such as Chrono Crusade, Digimon Frontier, Fullmetal Alchemist, InuYasha and School Rumble. As a result of his popularity among children audiences, the voice actor won a Nickelodeon Korea Kids' Choice Award in 2012 for Favorite Voice from an Animated Movie (known as Best Voice Actor/Actress in South Korea). He became the recipient of the award for his role as Po in Kung Fu Panda: Legends of Awesomeness, gaining 3,121 votes, which is about 38% of the entire poll.

He is known for his roles as Calcifer in Howl's Moving Castle, L Lawliet in Death Note, Po in Kung Fu Panda and Poli in Robocar Poli.

== Career ==
=== Voice acting ===
Year	Title	Network/Production	Role(s)	Notes/Ref.
2003	Dora the Explorer(도라도라 영어나라)	EBS	Backpack	On the EBS edition
2008	Sound of Prince ~The Acclaimed Morning Kiss~ (사운드 오브 왕자님 ~호평받는 모닝키스~)	Daeinbaes	Roe	

=== TV appearances ===
Year	Title	Network	Role(s)	Notes/Ref.
1998	Ding-Dong-Dang Kindergarten (딩동댕 유치원)	EBS	The guy	Um appeared as the guy who delivers a letter to Hong Gil-dong's mother.
2003	Into the Careers (성공 예감! 직업 속으로)	EBS	Himself	
2005	Anitopia (애니토피아)	EBS	Himself	He appeared on the segment "Ani-Where (애니웨어)". (Episode 89)
2005	Career and People (일과 사람들)	EBS	Himself	
2005-06	Tok! Tok! Boni, Hani (생방송 톡! 톡! 보니 하니)	EBS	Host	He hosted the segment "Tell Me, Show Me (말해 줘, 보여줘)" Thursdays.
2006	The Morning of the World (생방송 세상의 아침)	KBS	Himself	
2008	EBS DocuPrime (EBS 다큐프라임)	EBS	Himself	Episode: "Children's Privacy: Male and Female (아이의 사생활: 남과 여)"
2010	Mobile Suit Gundam 00 (기동전사 건담 더블오)	Anibox TV	Himself	The voice actor appeared on the trailer for the series.
2010	xxxHolic (xxx홀릭)	Anibox TV	Himself	He appeared on the trailer for the second season.
2011	Transformers: Prime (트랜스포머 프라임)	EBS	Himself	He appeared on the ending title for the first season.
2012	Nickelodeon Korea Kids' Choice Awards (니켈로디언 코리아 키즈 초이스 어워드)	Nickelodeon Korea	Himself	He appeared as one of the nominees, and the winner for Favorite Voice from an Animated Movie (Best Voice Actor/Actress).

=== Stage appearance ===
Year(s)	Title	Role(s)	Theater
1997-98	The Last Empress (Korean: 명성황후; RR: Myeong-seong-hwang-hu)	One of Japanese assassinators One of the royal servants	The Opera Theater, Seoul Arts Center, Seoul

=== Stage directing ===
Year	Title	Notes	Credited as	Theater
1997	Gaeddongi (Korean: 개똥이; RR: Gae-ttong-yi)	Rock opera	Assistant director	Munye Theater, Seoul (Note: The theater was renamed to Arko Arts Theater in 2002.)
1997	Moskito (Korean: 모스키토; RR: Mo-seu-ki-to)	Rock musical	Assistant director	Hakchon Green Small Theater, Seoul (Note: The theater ceased its operation on March 10, 2013, due to the change of building use.)

=== Film appearance ===
Year	Title	Role	Notes/Ref.
1992	Opening the Closed School Gates (Korean: 닫힌 교문을 열며; RR: Dat-hin Gyo-mun-eul Yeol-myeo)	Jin-soo	This is also the real debut film of Jung Jin-young (South Korean actor), who later gained publicity after appearing in King and the Clown. The movie was banned due to its failure of passing prior deliberation. Instead, the independent film drew audiences through universities and civic centers, in the major cities across South Korea.

== Awards ==
=== Nickelodeon Korea Kids' Choice Awards ===
Year	Nominated work	Category	Result
2012	Po in Kung Fu Panda: Legends of Awesomeness	Favorite Voice from an Animated Movie (Best Voice Actor/Actress)	Won

== Personal life ==
Um Tae-jun (Korean: 엄태준), the son of Um, also has worked as a voice actor, participating in dubbing of various television shows for children, including Blue's Clues, Dora the Explorer, Team Umizoomi, and Tickety Toc. He recently voiced young Mike on the Korean dub of Pixar animated film Monsters University.

== See also ==
- Educational Broadcasting System
