= List of characters in Pororo the Little Penguin =

This is a list of all characters from the South Korean children's animated television series Pororo the Little Penguin.

== Main characters ==
Name	Description	Voiced By
Pororo	Pororo is the titular protagonist of the Pororo the Little Penguin franchise, who appears in almost every episode in the series. He also appears in Pororo Singalong, as one of the main characters.	Anna Paik (Season 1); Michelle Ruff ("Pororo to the Cookie Castle"); Samia Mounts (Season 2); Bommie Han (Seasons 3-4, Porong Porong Rescue Mission, Eddy The Clever Fox, Learn Shapes and Size with Eddy, <굿모닝, 뽀카!(Today's vocabulary)>, Pororo and Tayo's Facetime, Pororo Playday (some episodes #), Tik Tok English Set, Pororo Amazon Adventure, Season 6, Pororo Fairy Tale Adventure, Talking Pororo the Little Penguin); Monique Dami Lee (Season 5, English Show, Pororo Goes To Korea, Pororo in my pocket, Hana's Toy Show, Meet Pororo and Friends, Pororo Fairy Tales); Andrea Belo (Season 7); Janeane (Season 8); Maria Darling (Singalong, UK Dub)
Crong	Crong is a cute baby dinosaur and the parallel protagonist of the series and the parallel male lead. He lives in Pororo's house. Crong is the youngest of the group. He is usually with Pororo and is constantly getting into trouble.	Tünde Skovrán (Seasons 1, 2, 4 (earlier episodes), Season 1 (HD), Tik Tok English set and apps); Jenny Hyobin Cho (Season 3); Grace Johnson (Eddy The Clever Fox); Jacqueline Youn (Singalong NEW 1); Bob Edwards (Pororo to the Cookie Castle); Gillie Robic (Singalong, UK Dub); Weebz Herrera (Season 7); Karl (Season 8); Lexi Song (Singalong NEW 2, Pororo Fairy Tale Adventure and Learn Shapes and Size with Eddy); Monique Dami Lee (Hana's Toy Show, Pororo Playday); Bommie Han (Singalong, album version only)
Eddy	Eddy is a little fox who is intelligent and is a genius inventor. Sometimes, he can be a show-off. His inventions include robots, trains, cars, flying devices, ships and submersibles among other objects.	Kristen Myung-hee Cho (Seasons 1 and 5); Dorothy Elias-Fahn [credited as Midge Mayes] (Pororo to the Cookie Castle, Pororo Pop Star Adventure); Bommie Han (Season 2, iPad app); Erica Lee (Season 3 and English Show); Caelyn Shin (Season 4 and Getting Creative with Pororo); Anna Desmarais (Season 6, Eddy The Clever Fox); Melinna Bobadilla (Season 1 (HD)); Samantha Moon (Singalong NEW 1); Melanie Lynn Buckley (Tik Tok English Set, and apps); Jennifer Waescher (Singalong NEW 2-present); Elle Genovata (Season 7); Jen (Season 8); Emma Tate (Singalong, UK Dub); Monique Dami Lee (Hana's Toy Show); Colleen O’Shaughnessey (Pororo the Little Penguin: The Racing Adventure); Barri Tsavaris
Loopy	Loopy is a pretty, cute, young female beaver who is often the voice of reason in the show. She is very shy, sensitive, and sometimes she can be a little princessy.	Lisa Kelley (Season 1); Philece Sampler [credited as Vicky Green] (Pororo to the Cookie Castle); Andrea Libman (Season 2 [first 10 episodes]); Hannah Grace (Season 2 [next 42 episodes]); Samantha Kim Daniel (Seasons 3 and most of 4, Season 1 (HD) and Tik Tok English Set); Grace Johnson (Eddy The Clever Fox); Caelyn Shin (Season 5, English Show, Loopy, the Cooking Princess, and apps); Anna Paik (Porong Porong Rescue Mission, Season 6, Getting Creative with Pororo, Pororo Singalong NEW 1 & 2, Pororo Fairy Tale Adventure, Learn Shapes and Size with Eddy); Jo Wyatt (Singalong, UK Dub); Dana Gaier (Season 4 (a few episodes)); Christine Marie Cabanos (Pororo the Little Penguin: The Racing Adventure); March Vargas (Season 7); Jen (Season 8); Monique Dami Lee (Pororo Playday, Hana's Toy Show, e-book); Barri Tsavaris
Petty	Petty is the parallel female lead of the series who is a little penguin with an orange beak. She is Loopy's best friend. She wears a violet hood and cap.	Bommie Han (Season 2, Tik Tok English Set and Official books); Shannon Chan-Kent (Season 3); Samantha Kim Daniel (Season 4 [first 7 episodes], 5, English Show, Pororo Goes To Korea, Loopy The Cooking Princess); Caelyn Shin (Season 4 [next 27 episodes]); Anna Desmarais (Season 6, Eddy The Clever Fox, Porong Porong Rescue Mission); Gillie Robic (Singalong, UK Dub); Jacqueline Youn (Singalong NEW 1); Monique Dami Lee (Singalong NEW 2-present, also for Pororo Playday); Dorothy Elias-Fahn (Pororo the Little Penguin: The Racing Adventure); Marick Dacanay (Season 7); Janeane (Season 8)
Poby	Poby is a polar bear that resides out by a glacier. He is the largest of all the cast and has a very gentle nature. He enjoys fishing and photography and does most of the village chores.	Brandon Yu (Season 1); Dave Mallow (Pororo to the Cookie Castle); Robert William Gardiner (Seasons 2 & 4, Tik Tok English Set, apps); James Bondy (Season 3); John Choi (English Show, Pororo Goes to Korea, Loopy the Cooking Princess, Season 5); Don Johnson (Eddy The Clever Fox); Matthew Anipen (Season 6, Singalong NEW 1, NEW 2, Pororo Fairy Tale Adventure); Jason Grasl (Season 1 (HD)); Paolo Anana (Season 7); Clark (Season 8); Keith Wickham (Singalong, UK dub); Chris Jai Alex (Pororo the Little Penguin: The Racing Adventure); Jon Heder (Pororo Snow Fairy Adventure, Pororo: Treasure Island Adventure); Kyle Hebert (Pororo: Dragon Castle Adventure onwards); Monique Dami Lee (Hana's Toy Show only); Daniel Kennendy (Audiobooks)
Harry	Harry is a cute ruby feathered hummingbird who wears a blue shirt with a big purple bow tie.	Bommie Han (Season 2, Tik Tok English Set and Harry's Character Battle); Jenny Hyobin Cho (Season 3-5, Pororo Goes To Korea, Loopy The Cooking Princess, English Show); Nancy Kim (Eddy the Clever Fox, Porong Porong Rescue Mission, Season 6, Getting Creative with Pororo, Pororo Singalong NEW 1 & 2, Pororo Fairy Tale Adventure, Learn Shapes and Size with Eddy); Elle Genovata (Season 7); Victoria (Season 8); Melvyn Hayes (Singalong, UK Dub)
Rody	Rody is one of the main characters of Pororo the Little Penguin. He is a yellow robot who shaped like fox ears who is built by Eddy.	Adam Lofbomm (Season 3, Eddy The Clever Fox); Greg Irwin (Season 4[first six episodes]); Anna Paik (Season 4[last 28 episodes], Tik Tok English Set, realistic voice); Samantha Kim Daniel (Season 5, English Show, Loopy, the Cooking Princess); Josh Schwartzentruber (Season 6); Weebz Herrera (Season 7); Karl (Season 8); Matthew Anipen (Singalong NEW 1 and 2, current voice); Jay Simon (UK Dub)

== Other main characters ==
Name	Description	Voiced by
Tong-Tong	Tong-Tong is an orange dragon whose magic powers are achieved by chanting his own name many times; very often, his magic backfires, and can cause trouble for the gang. He can also magically morph into a large dragon to fly long distances, but he often has difficulty landing.	John Lee (Seasons 3-6); Brad Curtin (Eddy The Clever Fox); Jason Grasl (NEW 1); Reymar Casareo (Season 7); Victoria (Season 8); Matthew Anipen (Singalong NEW 1 and 2, also for Learn Shapes and Size with Eddy); Monique Dami Lee (Pororo in my pocket)
Tu-Tu	Tu-Tu is a red, solar-powered supercar that can drive the friends around the village. When he gets no fuel, he stays in the sun to get more fuel. He can be playful sometimes.	Caelyn Shin (Seasons 4-5); Anna Paik (Season 6); Bailey Pepper (UK Dub)
Wall Clock	Wall Clock is a recurring character that lives in Tong-Tong's House. He first appeared in Clumsy Magician.	James Bondy (Season 3); John Lee (Season 4 & 5); Josh Schwartzentruber (Season 6); Matthew Anipen (Pororo Singalong NEW 2); Gibson M. Diwa (Season 7)
Nyao	Nyao is a toy kitten who likes causing trouble with his naughtiness. In the episode "Playful Nyao", while Tong-Tong is away, Wall Clock, which Nyao had taunted him. He now belongs to Petty, who became his owner. He is in love with Petty.	Bommie Han
Shark	The Shark is a recurring character in the series, and sometimes an antagonist. He first appeared in 'Learning How to Swim' and made subsequent appearances since.	Bob Gardiner (Season 2 [partially]); Koo Ja-hyeong (Season 2 [partially, original audio is retained]); John Lee (Season 3, Pororo's English Show); Um Sang-hyun (Season 4 [original audio is retained]); Kim Hwan-jin (Season 5 [original audio is retained]); Matthew Anipen (Season 6, Singalong NEW 2); Jason Grasl (Season 1[HD])

== Aliens ==
Name	Description	Voiced by
Pipi	Pipi is a purple alien with a yellow face, large white eyes with black pupils, and five yellow limbs below her body, which can be used for arms and legs.	Jenny Hyobin Cho (Season 3); Caelyn Shin (Season 5, Pororo's English Show); Bommie Han (Tik Tok English Set)
Popo	Popo is a blue tripod alien with a yellow face, and five yellow limbs below his body, which can be used for arms and legs.	Samantha Kim Daniel (Season 3); Caelyn Shin (Season 5); Bommie Han (Tik Tok English Set)

== Minor characters ==
Name	Description	Voiced by
Dragon	The dragon used to be a monster, but after all, he is a very nice and friendly dragon to all of the village.	Josh Schwartzentruber (Season 2 only); Richard Ridings (Singalong, UK Dub)
Snow Monster	The Snow Monster is the former main antagonist of the episode "Snowy Day", and a supporting character in the series.	John Lee (Season 3 & 5); Josh Schwartzentruber (Season 6)
Whale	The Whale is a minor character in Pororo the Little Penguin, debuting in "Train Adventure".	Brandon Yu (Season 1 [US dub]); Keith Wickham (Season 1 [UK dub]); Bob Gardiner (Season 4); Jessica Rau (Talk Talk Pen Songs); Devin Hennessy (Season 1 [HD]); Garan Fitzgerald (Singalong NEW 1)
Fuzzy Wuzzy	Fuzzy Wuzzy is a recurring character in Pororo the Little Penguin.	Josh Schwartzentruber
Tayo	Tayo is a minor character who made an appearance in Pororo in Wonderland 2, the episode of Season 8 and is the main character in Tayo the Little Bus franchise. He also appeared in Pororo and Tayo's Facetime.	Monique Dami Lee (Hana's Toy Show)

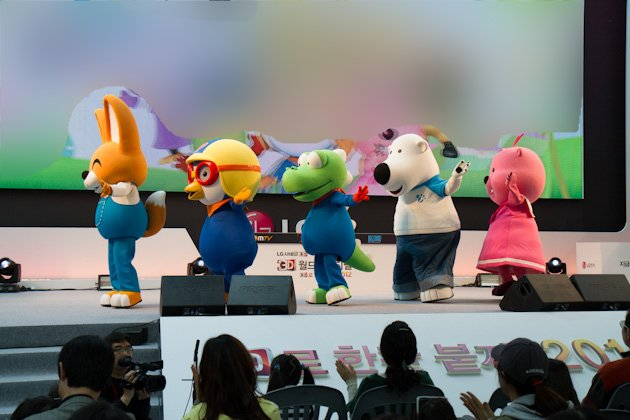
Eddy, Pororo, Crong, Poby, and Loopy at LG Cinema 3D World Festival

== See also ==
- Tayo The Little Bus
- List of Tayo The Little Bus Characters
- Titipo Titipo
