= Loop =

A loop (knot) is one of the fundamental structures used to tie knots.

Loop or LOOP may also refer to:

== Arts, entertainment, and media ==
=== Film ===
- Loop (1997 film), a British romantic comedy
- Loop (1998 film), a Venezuelan film
- Loop (2020 film), an American animated short
- Film loop, the slack portion of the film around the projector lens in a movie projector
- Porn loop, an 8 or 16 mm film "short" of a pornographic nature

=== Music ===
==== Groups ====
- Loop (band), a London rock band

==== Other uses in music ====
- Loop (album), a 2002 album by Keller Williams
- Loop (EP), a 2024 extended play by Yves
- Loop (music), a finite element of sound repeated by technical means
- "Loop" (Maaya Sakamoto song), 2005
- "Loop" (Sarah Bonnici song), the entry for Malta in the Eurovision Song Contest 2024
- Loop, a 2020 mini-album by Peakboy

=== Roller coasters ===
- Loop (roller coaster), a basic roller coaster inversion
- Pretzel loop, a roller coaster element

=== Other uses in arts, entertainment, and media ===
- Loop (novel), a novel in the Ring series by Koji Suzuki
- LOOP Barcelona, an annual event for video art in Barcelona, Spain

== Brands and enterprises ==
- Loop (mobile), a Bulgarian virtual network operator and co-founder of Loop Live
- Loop Internet, an internet service provider in Pennsylvania, US
- Loop Mobile, an Indian mobile phone operator
- Loop, a company founded by Carlos Vasquez in the 1990s; their clothing worn by Digable Planets
- Loop, underground public transportation system of The Boring Company using Tesla cars

== People ==
- Call Me Loop (born 1991), English singer and songwriter
- Liza Loop (active from 1975), American technology pioneer
- Uno Loop (1930–2021), Estonian singer, musician, athlete, actor, and educator
- Victoria Loop, brass and guitar player with English band Half Man Half Biscuit
- Tyler Loop, American football player

== Places ==
=== Populated places ===
- Loop, Germany, a municipality in Schleswig-Holstein
- Loop, Blair County, Pennsylvania, US, an unincorporated community
- Loop, Indiana County, Pennsylvania, US, an unincorporated community
- Loop, Texas, US, a census-designated place
- Loop, West Virginia, US, an unincorporated community
- Chicago Loop, the downtown neighborhood of Chicago bounded by the elevated railway The Loop
  - Loop Retail Historic District, a shopping district in the Chicago Loop
- Delmar Loop, an entertainment district in St. Louis, Missouri

=== Other places ===
- Louisiana Offshore Oil Port, a deep-water port in the Gulf of Mexico off the coast of Louisiana

== Science, technology, and mathematics ==
=== Mathematics ===
- Loop (algebra), a quasigroup with an identity element
- Loop (graph theory), an edge that begins and ends on the same vertex
- Loop (topology), a path that starts and ends at the same point, possibly reduced to a single point

=== Programming and software ===
- Loop (statement), a method of control flow in computer science
- LOOP (programming language), a simple register language capturing exactly the primitive recursive functions via bounded loops
- Loop device, a Unix device node that allows a file to be mounted as if it were a device
- LOOPS, the object system for Interlisp-D
- Microsoft Loop, collaborative software
- Loops (social network), a project from Pixelfed to bring Tiktok-like social media to the Fediverse

=== Other uses in electronics ===
- Loop (telecommunication) or loopback, sending a signal on a channel and receiving it back at the sending terminal
- Audio induction loop, an aid for the hard of hearing
- Local loop, the physical link in telephony that links the customer premises to the telephone company
- Control loop, a fundamental component of control systems

=== Other uses in science and technology ===
- Loop (biochemistry), a flexible region in a protein's secondary structure
- Control loop, a fundamental component of control systems
- Ground loop (aviation), a rapid horizontal (yawing) rotation of a fixed-wing aircraft used in emergencies to bleed off energy while landing
- Loop, a type of fingerprint pattern

== Sports ==
- Loop (cricket), an aspect of bowling in cricket
- Loop jump, a figure skating jump
- Aerobatic loop, a type of aerobatic maneuver
- Loop, a type of canoe freestyle maneuver
- Loop, a type of offensive shot in table tennis

== Transportation ==
=== Rail ===
- Loop line (railway), a branch line that deviates from a direct route and rejoins it at another location
- Balloon loop, a section of rail track that allows reversal of direction without stopping
- Passing loop, a short section of track that allows trains to pass on a single track route
- Circle route, a public transport route that travels around and connects the peripheral zones of an area
- Spiral (railway), a section of track that allows a train to climb a steep hill
- Loop (Amtrak train), a discontinued Amtrak train
- The Loop (CTA), a rapid transit section bounding Chicago's Loop neighborhood

=== Road ===
==== Terminology ====
- Loop, the end of some dead-end streets
- Circle route, a public transport route that travels around and connects the peripheral zones of an area
- Loop route, a main route or highway that forms a closed loop
- Ring road or loop, a main route or highway that encircles a town or city

==== Individual roads and paths ====
- Loop (Texarkana), a roadway loop around Texarkana, Arkansas, US
- Loop 101, a semi-beltway of the Phoenix Metropolitan Area
- Loop 202, a semi-beltway of the Phoenix Metropolitan Area
- Loop 303, a semi-beltway of the Phoenix Metropolitan Area
- London Outer Orbital Path, a signed walk around the edge of Outer London, England
- Loop, underground public transportation system of The Boring Company using Tesla cars

== Other uses ==
- Compulsion loop, a habitual chain of activities that will be repeated by the user to cause them to continue the activity
- Looping (education), the process of advancing an elementary school teacher with his or her class
- Loop (knot), one of the fundamental structures used to tie knots

== See also ==
- The Loop (disambiguation)
- Circle
- Cycle (disambiguation)
- Cycle graph
- Hoop (disambiguation)
- Inner loop (disambiguation)
- Line echo wave pattern (LEWP)
- Loophole
- Looping (disambiguation)
- Loopy (disambiguation)
- Loupe, a small magnifying glass used by jewelers, watchmakers, and other precision craftsmen
- Möbius strip
- Ring (disambiguation)
