= List of Tayo the Little Bus episodes =

Tayo the Little Bus (Korean: 꼬마버스 타요) is a South Korean animated television series created by Iconix Entertainment, Educational Broadcasting System and the Metropolitan Government of Seoul. Tayo the Little Bus has eight seasons, each season containing 26 episodes.

== Series overview ==
| Season | Episodes | | Originally released | |
| Season | Episodes | | First released | Last released |
|---|---|---|---|---|
| 1 | 26 | | August 23, 2010 | November 16, 2010 |
| 2 | 26 | | November 30, 2011 | April 26, 2012 |
| 3 | 26 | | March 5, 2014 | May 29, 2014 |
| 4 | 26 | | August 31, 2016 | November 24, 2016 |
| 5 | 26 | | November 1, 2018 | June 7, 2019 |
| 6 | 26 | | July 7, 2022 | November 19, 2022 |
| 7 | 26 | | 26 February 2024 | 23 May 2024 |
| 8 | 26 | 12 | 4 March 2026 | 20 May 2026 |
| 8 | 26 | 14 | 2 September 2026 | 2 December 2026 |

== Episodes ==
=== Season 1 (2010) ===
| No. overall | No. in season | Title | Original release date |
|---|---|---|---|
| 1 | 1 | "A Day in the Life of Tayo" | 23 August 2010 (TV); 27 April 2012 (YouTube) |
| 2 | 2 | "Tayo Gets Lost" | 24 August 2010 (TV); 27 April 2012 (YouTube) |
| 3 | 3 | "Tayo's First Drive" | 30 August 2010 (TV); 27 April 2012 (YouTube) |
| 4 | 4 | "Good Friends" | 31 August 2010 (TV); 20 March 2013 (YouTube) |
| 5 | 5 | "Afraid of the Dark" | 6 September 2010 (TV); 20 March 2013 (YouTube) |
| 6 | 6 | "Thanks, Cito!" | 7 September 2010 (TV); 20 March 2013 (YouTube) |
| 7 | 7 | "Let's All Get Along" | 13 September 2010 (TV); 20 March 2013 (YouTube) |
| 8 | 8 | "I Want New Tires" | 14 September 2010 (TV); 20 March 2013 (YouTube) |
| 9 | 9 | "Our New Friend, Gani" | 20 September 2010 (TV); 20 March 2013 (YouTube) |
| 10 | 10 | "Hana and Gani" | 21 September 2010 (TV); 21 March 2013 (YouTube) |
| 11 | 11 | "I Want to Go on a Picnic!" | 27 September 2010 (TV); 21 March 2013 (YouTube) |
| 12 | 12 | "Let's Be Friends" | 28 September 2010 (TV); 21 March 2013 (YouTube) |
| 13 | 13 | "Nuri is a Superstar" | 4 October 2010 (TV); 21 March 2013 (YouTube) |
| 14 | 14 | "Rogi's Hiccups" | 5 October 2010 (TV); 21 March 2013 (YouTube) |
| 15 | 15 | "Hana's Day Out" | 11 October 2010 (TV); 21 March 2013 (YouTube) |
| 16 | 16 | "The Best Heavy Equipment" | 12 October 2010 (TV); 21 March 2013 (YouTube) |
| 17 | 17 | "Joey, the Magician" | 18 October 2010 (TV); 21 March 2013 (YouTube) |
| 18 | 18 | "Frank and Alice Are Awesome!" | 19 October 2010 (TV); 21 March 2013 (YouTube) |
| 19 | 19 | "Lani's Misunderstanding" | 25 October 2010 (TV); 21 March 2013 (YouTube) |
| 20 | 20 | "Make Up, Frank and Alice" | 26 October 2010 (TV); 21 March 2013 (YouTube) |
| 21 | 21 | "Tayo's Space Adventure" | 1 November 2010 (TV); 21 March 2013 (YouTube) |
| 22 | 22 | "Speeding is Dangerous" | 2 November 2010 (TV); 21 March 2013 (YouTube) |
| 23 | 23 | "Lani's Day Off" | 8 November 2010 (TV); 21 March 2013 (YouTube) |
| 24 | 24 | "My Job's the Hardest" | 9 November 2010 (TV); 21 March 2013 (YouTube) |
| 25 | 25 | "Gani is Sick" | 15 November 2010 (TV); 21 March 2013 (YouTube) |
| 26 | 26 | "Tayo is the Best" | 16 November 2010 (TV); 21 March 2013 (YouTube) |

=== Season 2 (2011–12) ===
| No. overall | No. in season | Title | Original release date |
|---|---|---|---|
| 27 | 1 | "Tayo and Bongbong" | 30 November 2011 (TV); 10 September 2014 (YouTube) |
| 28 | 2 | "The Perfect Duo, Rookie and Pat" | 1 December 2011 (TV); 10 September 2014 (YouTube) |
| 29 | 3 | "Gani the Teacher!" | 7 December 2011 (TV); 10 September 2014 (YouTube) |
| 30 | 4 | "I'll Help You, Big!" | 8 December 2011 (TV); 10 September 2014 (YouTube) |
| 31 | 5 | "Please Pick Me" | 14 December 2011 (TV); 10 September 2014 (YouTube) |
| 32 | 6 | "A New Playground" | 15 December 2011 (TV); 10 September 2014 (YouTube) |
| 33 | 7 | "Nana Visits the City" | 21 December 2011 (TV); 10 September 2014 (YouTube) |
| 34 | 8 | "Nuri's Worst Day" | 22 December 2011 (TV); 10 September 2014 (YouTube) |
| 35 | 9 | "The Treasure is Mine" | 28 December 2011 (TV); 10 September 2014 (YouTube) |
| 36 | 10 | "Rogi the Detective" | 29 December 2011 (TV); 10 September 2014 (YouTube) |
| 37 | 11 | "Rogi's Special Guest" | 4 January 2012 (TV); 11 September 2014 (YouTube) |
| 38 | 12 | "The Leader of the Playground" | 5 January 2012 (TV); 11 September 2014 (YouTube) |
| 39 | 13 | "Cito's Secret" | 11 January 2012 (TV); 11 September 2014 (YouTube) |
| 40 | 14 | "Lani the Princess" | 12 January 2012 (TV); 11 September 2014 (YouTube) |
| 41 | 15 | "Tayo the Grown-Up" | 18 January 2012 (TV); 11 September 2014 (YouTube) |
| 42 | 16 | "Tiny Tayo" | 19 January 2012 (TV); 11 September 2014 (YouTube) |
| 43 | 17 | "Tayo's Space Adventure: Part 1" | 25 January 2012 (TV); 11 September 2014 (YouTube) |
| 44 | 18 | "Tayo's Space Adventure: Part 2" | 26 January 2012 (TV); 11 September 2014 (YouTube) |
| 45 | 19 | "It's Hard to Behave" | 4 April 2012 (TV); 11 September 2014 (YouTube) |
| 46 | 20 | "Gani's Present" | 5 April 2012 (TV); 11 September 2014 (YouTube) |
| 47 | 21 | "Air, the Brave Helicopter" | 11 April 2012 (TV); 11 September 2014 (YouTube) |
| 48 | 22 | "Prank Call Madness" | 12 April 2012 (TV); 11 September 2014 (YouTube) |
| 49 | 23 | "A Frightful Night" | 18 April 2012 (TV); 11 September 2014 (YouTube) |
| 50 | 24 | "Nana's Invitation" | 19 April 2012 (TV); 11 September 2014 (YouTube) |
| 51 | 25 | "Tayo's First Snow Day" | 25 April 2012 (TV); 11 September 2014 (YouTube) |
| 52 | 26 | "Hana's Special Day" | 26 April 2012 (TV); 11 September 2014 (YouTube) |

=== Season 3 (2014) ===
| No. overall | No. in season | Title | Original release date |
|---|---|---|---|
| 53 | 1 | "The New Friend, Heart" | 26 February 2014 (TV); 3 October 2015 (YouTube) |
Heart is a young girl car and she is only recently licensed. Just like any other cars new to the town, she has to go to the Auto Show to find her new family. But because of her small size compared to other bigger cars, she doesn't get chosen by anyone. Heart-broken and all alone, Heart runs into Hana, the mechanic, who is all dressed up for a day out.
| 54 | 2 | "We Are a Family" | 27 February 2014 (TV); 3 October 2015 (YouTube) |
| 55 | 3 | "Rogi the Sweeper" | 5 March 2014 (TV); 3 October 2015 (YouTube) |
| 56 | 4 | "I Know It All" | 6 March 2014 (TV); 10 October 2015 (YouTube) |
| 57 | 5 | "A School Day" | 12 March 2014 (TV); 10 October 2015 (YouTube) |
| 58 | 6 | "Cheer Up, Frank" | 13 March 2014 (TV); 17 October 2015 (YouTube) |
| 59 | 7 | "A Weekend with Citu" | 19 March 2014 (TV); 24 October 2015 (YouTube) |
| 60 | 8 | "Tayo's Promise" | 20 March 2014 (TV); 24 October 2015 (YouTube) |
| 61 | 9 | "Gani the Super Star" | 26 March 2014 (TV); 31 October 2015 (YouTube) |
| 62 | 10 | "Toto and Bongbong" | 27 March 2014 (TV); 31 October 2015 (YouTube) |
| 63 | 11 | "Laugh, Pat" | 2 April 2014 (TV); 7 November 2015 (YouTube) |
| 64 | 12 | "We Are the Best with Each Other" | 3 April 2014 (TV); 7 November 2015 (YouTube) |
| 65 | 13 | "Cooku & Champ's Trip to the City" | 9 April 2014 (TV); 14 November 2015 (YouTube) |
| 66 | 14 | "I Can't Sleep" | 10 April 2014 (TV); 14 November 2015 (YouTube) |
| 67 | 15 | "I Want to Be Your Friend" | 16 April 2014 (TV); 21 November 2015 (YouTube) |
| 68 | 16 | "City Heroes, Tayo & Duri" | 17 April 2014 (TV); 21 November 2015 (YouTube) |
| 69 | 17 | "We Are the Heavy-Duty Circus" | 23 April 2014 (TV); 28 November 2015 (YouTube) |
| 70 | 18 | "The Best Mechanic" | 24 April 2014 (TV); 28 November 2015 (YouTube) |
| 71 | 19 | "I Want a Puppy" | 30 April 2014 (TV); 5 December 2015 (YouTube) |
| 72 | 20 | "Poco's Flower" | 1 May 2014 (TV); 5 December 2015 (YouTube) |
| 73 | 21 | "Ask Met Anything" | 7 May 2014 (TV); 12 December 2015 (YouTube) |
| 74 | 22 | "Tayo's Christmas" | 8 May 2014 (TV); 12 December 2015 (YouTube) |
| 75 | 23 | "Tayo's Earth Defense: Plan 1" | 14 May 2014 (TV); 19 December 2015 (YouTube) |
| 76 | 24 | "Tayo's Earth Defense: Plan 2" | 15 May 2014 (TV); 19 December 2015 (YouTube) |
| 77 | 25 | "Somebody Help Us" | 21 May 2014 (TV); 26 December 2015 (YouTube) |
| 78 | 26 | "The Little Buses Sports Day" | 22 May 2014 (TV); 26 December 2015 (YouTube) |

=== Season 4 (2016) ===
| No. overall | No. in season | Title | Original release date |
|---|---|---|---|
| 79 | 1 | "Nice to Meet You, Peanut" | 31 August 2016 (TV); 31 March 2017 (YouTube) |
| 80 | 2 | "You Are Special" | 1 September 2016 (TV); 6 April 2017 (YouTube) |
| 81 | 3 | "Please Believe Me" | 7 September 2016 (TV); 8 April 2017 (YouTube) |
| 82 | 4 | "The New Emergency Center" | 8 September 2016 (TV); 15 April 2017 (YouTube) |
| 83 | 5 | "Who is the Real Tayo?" | 14 September 2016 (TV); 20 April 2017 (YouTube) |
| 84 | 6 | "Chris Wants Recognition" | 15 September 2016 (TV); 22 April 2017 (YouTube) |
| 85 | 7 | "Rogi's Junk Treasure" | 21 September 2016 (TV); 27 April 2017 (YouTube) |
| 86 | 8 | "Tayo Becomes a Police Officer" | 22 September 2016 (TV); 29 April 2017 (YouTube) |
| 87 | 9 | "Trammy's First Day at Work" | 28 September 2016 (TV); 4 May 2017 (YouTube) |
| 88 | 10 | "Who is Cooler?" | 29 September 2016 (TV); 6 May 2017 (YouTube) |
| 89 | 11 | "Mountain Ghost Incident" | 5 October 2016 (TV); 11 July 2018 (YouTube) |
| 90 | 12 | "Trammy's Secret" | 6 October 2016 (TV); 12 July 2018 (YouTube) |
| 91 | 13 | "Peanut's Misunderstanding" | 12 October 2016 (TV); 13 July 2018 (YouTube) |
| 92 | 14 | "We Love Fairy Tales" | 13 October 2016 (TV); 14 July 2018 (YouTube) |
| 93 | 15 | "Asura the Little Wizard" | 19 October 2016 (TV); 15 July 2018 (YouTube) |
| 94 | 16 | "The Best Detective" | 20 October 2016 (TV); 16 July 2018 (YouTube) |
| 95 | 17 | "Give Me Courage" | 26 October 2016 (TV); 13 July 2018 (YouTube) |
| 96 | 18 | "Tayo Goes to the Countryside" | 27 October 2016 (TV); 18 July 2018 (YouTube) |
| 97 | 19 | "We Are All Friends" | 2 November 2016 (TV); 19 July 2018 (YouTube) |
| 98 | 20 | "Kinder's Field Trip" | 3 November 2016 (TV); 20 July 2018 (YouTube) |
| 99 | 21 | "Citu's Secret Playground" | 9 November 2016 (TV); 21 July 2018 (YouTube) |
| 100 | 22 | "Thank You, Ms. Teach!" | 10 November 2016 (TV); 22 July 2018 (YouTube) |
| 101 | 23 | "A Day with Booba" | 16 November 2016 (TV); 23 July 2018 (YouTube) |
| 102 | 24 | "A Present for Hana" | 17 November 2016 (TV); 24 July 2018 (YouTube) |
| 103 | 25 | "Duri's Homework" | 23 November 2016 (TV); 24 July 2018 (YouTube) |
| 104 | 26 | "The Little Buses' Play" | 24 November 2016 (TV); 25 July 2018 (YouTube) |

=== Season 5 (2018–19) ===
Monique Dami Lee replaced Robyn Slade as the voice of Tayo.

| No. overall | No. in season | Title | Original release date |
|---|---|---|---|
| 105 | 1 | "Emergency Dispatch! Tayo and Gani" | 1 November 2018 (TV); 6 July 2019 (YouTube) |
Tayo and Gani become fire engine. Have you ever imagined our little buses become fire trucks? Anyhow, they thought they would do an amazing job but putting down fire in emergency situations isn't easy!
| 106 | 2 | "Rogi's Extraordinary Challenge" | 6 November 2018 (TV); 13 July 2019 (YouTube) |
When Rogi wants to be on TV, Rogi had an extraorinary challenge!
| 107 | 3 | "The Cello's Owner" | 9 November 2018 (TV); 23 August 2019 (YouTube) |
A cellist named Hans is nervous to be on stage, so Peanut has to help him get used to it.
| 108 | 4 | "A Fantastic Pair" | 13 November 2018 (TV); 20 July 2019 (YouTube) |
Speed and Shine are the best friends in the city. As they promised to stick together, Shine tries to become a model and goes to try the contest. The good news is the winner gets to go aboard and be a vehicle model. But Speed gets sad that Shine might go aboard. Will a fantastic pair stay together?
| 109 | 5 | "Tayo and Titipo's Race" | 16 November 2018 (TV); 27 July 2019 (YouTube) |
Tayo and Titipo are having a race, but Hana explains that buses and trains do not race.
| 110 | 6 | "New Rescuer, Jay" | 20 November 2018 (TV); 14 September 2019 (YouTube) |
A rescuer named Jay has come to join the team at the emergency center, Lani gets upset, when Jay tells that the elevator is out of order, much to Lani's anger.
| 111 | 7 | "Tayo's Bird Friend" | 28 November 2018 (TV); 3 August 2019 (YouTube) |
Tayo has many many friends but, a bird friend? A bird builds a next on top of Tayo's bus and Tayo has been frustrated since he can't do anything because of the bird. Whats is Tayo going to do?
| 112 | 8 | "Kinder's Visit to the Farm" | 27 November 2018 (TV); 17 August 2019 (YouTube) |
Duri and his kindergarten friends going to the farm with Kinder. As Kinder tried to help other friends, especially Duri, it doesn't go away the Kinder thinks. What is exactly Kinder doing at the farm?
| 113 | 9 | "The Secret Playground" | 30 November 2018 (TV); 17 September 2019 (YouTube) |
The little buses became very sad because the secret playground was destroyed by the heavy rain. As the little buses rebuilds the secret playground that was destroyed by the heavy rain, Citu plans Joey the magician to build a car amusement park which will replace the secret playground.
| 114 | 10 | "Surprise Gift for Duri" | 7 December 2018 (TV); 21 September 2019 (YouTube) |
As Duri's birthday approaches, Tayo volunteers help Duri's dad to pick Duri's birthday present. What it will be?
| 115 | 11 | "You Can Do It, Tony" | 14 December 2018 (TV); 18 September 2019 (YouTube) |
As Tony, who is an unofficial rapper of the bus town, he wants to perform in front of other buses. But it looks like he struggles.
| 116 | 12 | "Heart's Secret" | 21 December 2018 (TV); 19 September 2019 (YouTube) |
As Heart doesn't like Rogi collects everything he sees on the street, she finds one thing that she likes. What it would be?
| 117 | 13 | "Joy's Magic Show" | 28 December 2018 (TV); 18 October 2019 (YouTube) |
Joy used to be very famous but it sounded like he's having a boring day. What's happening to Joy the Magician?
| 118 | 14 | "Thanks, Gani!" | 8 March 2019 (TV); 22 September 2019 (YouTube) |
As Gani always helps out other friends, sometimes he misses his chances to do something, such as taking a shower or going to see a movie!
| 119 | 15 | "The Little Buses Go to America: Part 1" | 15 March 2019 (TV); 15 March 2019 (YouTube) |
Little buses go to America! Tayo won from contest and the prize was trip to America! What adventure is waiting for them?
| 120 | 16 | "The Little Buses Go to America: Part 2" | 22 March 2019 (TV); 22 March 2019 (YouTube) |
As Tayo is trying to help Maily, things get more complicated than he thought! Will things turn out as Maily hoped for?
| 121 | 17 | "Rogi and the Lucky Genie" | 29 March 2019 (TV); 20 September 2019 (YouTube) |
Rogi thinks that things happening around him hasn't been unlucky. So he asks his friends how to be a lucky bus and other bus friends suggests that Genie is the lucky charm.
| 122 | 18 | "Lolly, The New City Tour Bus" | 5 April 2019 (TV); 11 October 2019 (YouTube) |
Lolly is the new city tour bus who is doing training with Cito. Lolly seems smart and a hard-working bus but other buses think she should take a break and look around too.
| 123 | 19 | "Booba's Vacation" | 12 April 2019 (TV); 20 September 2019 (YouTube) |
Booba visits the little buses at the garage to spend his vacation. As he wishes to spend his vacation as relaxed time, little buses insist to take him to amusement park. Amusement park? Would Booba likes spend his vacation with little buses?
| 124 | 20 | "The Little Buses Go Camping" | 19 April 2019 (TV); 27 September 2019 (YouTube) |
Tayo and Rogi run into Windy and he says that he just got back from camping. Windy suggests that buses should go camping together and they did! But, you know Rogi and Tayo, they starts to argue over what to prepare for camping. Will their first camping go well?
| 125 | 21 | "Heart Has Grown Bigger" | 26 April 2019 (TV); 29 September 2019 (YouTube) |
Heart wants to grow bigger since she's the some of smaller cars in town. So, she made a wish and guess what? she became as big as other cars. Can you believe it? and How could it happen?
| 126 | 22 | "Trammy's Wish" | 3 May 2019 (TV); 30 September 2019 (YouTube) |
Trammy wishes that she could have wheels like other buses. Then she could hang out with them all the time! But she's a tram so that wouldn't happen, right? But what if, there's a magic and if she could have wheels like Tayo?
| 127 | 23 | "Lani's Present" | 10 May 2019 (TV); 1 October 2019 (YouTube) |
As Lani learns that having good friends is one thing that you can be thankful for, she decides to prepare gifts for her bus friends Tayo, Rogi and Gani. What presents will she give to them?
| 128 | 24 | "Jay and Iracha" | 24 May 2019 (TV); 2 October 2019 (YouTube) |
Iracha is a hard working delivery in town but he's been making mistakes often recently. As Jay finds out what bothers Iracha, Jay decides to help him to train so he wouldn't cause or get in accident on the roads.
| 129 | 25 | "The Little Dinosaur Friend: Part 1" | 31 May 2019 (TV); 3 October 2019 (YouTube) |
Have you ever thought that the Little buses would run into the little dinosaur friend? Well, it's Tino! Tino's adventure with the earth and Tayo starts today!
| 130 | 26 | "The Little Dinosaur Friend: Part 2" | 7 June 2019 (TV); 4 October 2019 (YouTube) |
Now it's the time! Tayo and the Little Buses are helping Tino so he could go back to his home. But, there's always people that try to take Dino from the buses and take him to where? Tayo and little buses, please help Tino!

=== Season 6 (2022) ===
Andrea Beto replaced Monique Dami Lee as the voice of Tayo, Andrei Ayson replaced Nolan Blazer as the voice of Rogi, Jay Santiago replaced Kerri Salki as the voice of Gani, and March Vargas replaced Kami Desilets as the voice of Lani.

| No. overall | No. in season | Title | Written by | Original release date |
|---|---|---|---|---|
| 131 | 1 | "You're Cool Just as You Are" | Unknown | 9 July 2022 (TV); 7 November 2022 (YouTube) |
| 132 | 2 | "A Secret That Can't Be Shared" | Unknown | 15 July 2022 (TV); 7 November 2022 (YouTube) |
| 133 | 3 | "The Playground is Gone" | Unknown | 16 July 2022 (TV); 7 November 2022 (YouTube) |
| 134 | 4 | "Everyone's New Playground" | Unknown | 22 July 2022 (TV); 7 November 2022 (YouTube) |
| 135 | 5 | "Rubby Becomes a Sprinkler Truck" | Unknown | 23 July 2022 (TV); 7 November 2022 (YouTube) |
| 136 | 6 | "I Need More Views" | Unknown | 29 July 2022 (TV); 7 November 2022 (YouTube) |
| 137 | 7 | "The Night Time Ruckus" | Unknown | 30 July 2022 (TV); 7 November 2022 (YouTube) |
| 138 | 8 | "Heart, the Magician's Assistant" | TBD | 2022 |
| 139 | 9 | "My Friend Cargo" | TBD | 2022 |
| 140 | 10 | "Happy Trammy" | TBD | 2022 |
| 141 | 11 | "The Green Light Ruckus" | TBD | 2022 |
| 142 | 12 | "New Friends at the Airport" | TBD | 2022 |
| 143 | 13 | "Let's Go! The Heavy Machinery Rangers" | TBD | 2022 |
| 144 | 14 | "Please Take Care of the Cat" | TBD | 2022 |
| 145 | 15 | "Alone in the Garage" | TBD | 2022 |
| 146 | 16 | "An Amazing Picnic" | TBD | 2022 |
| 147 | 17 | "Keep Going, Iracha" | TBD | 2022 |
| 148 | 18 | "The Spooky Amusement Park" | TBD | 2022 |
| 149 | 19 | "There's No Stopping Shine" | TBD | 2022 |
| 150 | 20 | "Long and Bongbong's Outing" | TBD | 2022 |
| 151 | 21 | "Guardian X's New Fan" | TBD | 2022 |
| 152 | 22 | "A Fun Day" | TBD | 2022 |
| 153 | 23 | "Don't Go Hana" | TBD | 2022 |
| 154 | 24 | "We Like Alice" | TBD | 2022 |
| 155 | 25 | "Carry Knows Everything" | TBD | 2022 |
| 156 | 26 | "A Festival for Everyone" | TBD | 2022 |

=== Season 7 (2024) ===
Caroline Orejuela replaced Andrea Beto as the voice of Tayo, Emerich Jimenez replaced Andrei Ayson as the voice of Rogi, William Savage replaced Jay Santiago as the voice of Gani, and Meggie Elise replaced March Vargas as the voice of Lani.

| No. overall | No. in season | Title | Written by | Original release date |
|---|---|---|---|---|
| 157 | 1 | "Gani, Let's Play Together!" | Unknown | February 26, 2024 |
| 158 | 2 | "The Monster at the Airport!" | TBD | 2024 |
| 159–160 | 3–4 | "The Heroic Rescue Team" | TBD | 2024 |
| 161 | 5 | "Magic Animal Chaos!" | TBD | 2024 |
| 162 | 6 | "Time, Please Stop!" | TBD | 2024 |
| 163 | 7 | "Wee-woo Wee-woo Emergency Preview" | TBD | 2024 |
| 164 | 8 | "Switched Luck" | TBD | 2024 |
| 165 | 9 | "Pictures Drawn in the Sky!" | TBD | 2024 |
| 166 | 10 | "Woolly's Hide and Seek" | TBD | 2024 |
| 167 | 11 | "Hana's New Assistant?" | TBD | 2024 |
| 168 | 12 | "My Dad is a Villain?" | TBD | 2024 |
| 169 | 13 | "An Imaginary Journey with Windy" | TBD | 2024 |
| 170 | 14 | "Exclusive Rescue Team 24 Hours" | TBD | 2024 |
| 171 | 15 | "Our Dog is the Best!" | TBD | 2024 |
| 172 | 16 | "The Airport Friends' Day Off" | TBD | 2024 |
| 173 | 17 | "Magician Joy's Secret" | TBD | 2024 |
| 174 | 18 | "Momo and Bibi, the Flying Twins" | TBD | 2024 |
| 175 | 19 | "The Great Safari Escape" | TBD | 2024 |
| 176 | 20 | "The Chorus Competition" | TBD | 2024 |
| 177 | 21 | "The Winter Festival with Sky" | TBD | 2024 |
| 178 | 22 | "We're All Friends" | TBD | 2024 |
| 179 | 23 | "Detective Rogi vs. Genie" | TBD | 2024 |
| 180 | 24 | "A Special Outing of a Superstar" | TBD | 2024 |
| 181 | 25 | "Give Gani Back" | TBD | 2024 |
| 182 | 26 | "Tayo's Amazing Story" | Unknown | 23 May 2024 |
