= The Loop =

The Loop may refer to:

== Entertainment and media ==
=== Books ===
- The Loop, a 1992 novel by Joe Coomer
- The Loop, a 1998 novel by Nicholas Evans

=== Film and television ===
- The Loop (Australian TV series), an Australian music television show
- The Loop (American TV series), a comedy television show on the Fox network
- "The Loop", a segment on American television show Attack of the Show!
- Tales from the Loop (American TV series), a Science Fiction drama based on the art of Simon Stålenhag

=== Music ===
- The Loop (Johnny Lytle album)
- The Loop (Andrew Cyrille album), 1978
- The Loop, an album by Jordan Rakei, 2024
- The Loop, a music remix group formed in 1993 by members of Celebrate the Nun
- "The Loop", a song by Morrissey from World of Morrissey

=== Radio ===
- WCKL (FM) (97.9 FM), a religious music station in Chicago formerly branded as classic rock station The Loop (WLUP-FM)
- WKQX (FM), a rock radio station in Chicago a classic rock format branded as "The Loop"

== Neighborhoods ==
- Chicago Loop, the central business district of Chicago, Illinois, U.S.
- Delmar Loop, a district in St. Louis and University City, Missouri, U.S.
- Lok Ma Chau Loop, the proposed development site for the Hong Kong-Shenzhen Innovation and Technology Park

== Transportation ==
=== Bicycle/pedestrian infrastructure ===
- The Loop (Tucson), a network of shared-use paths in Tucson, Arizona, U.S.
- The Loop (Dubai), a planned 93 km long bicycle highway in Dubai, UAE

=== Rail transportation ===
- Alaska Central Railroad Tunnel No. 1, a tunnel and trestle in Alaska, known colloquially as "The Loop" or "The Loop District"
- Loop (Amtrak train), a former Amtrak train service between Chicago and Springfield, Illinois, U.S.
- The Loop (CTA), an elevated rail circuit in downtown Chicago, Illinois, U.S.
- Tehachapi Loop, a railway spiral in California, U.S.

=== Road transportation ===
- Interstate 610 (Texas), a beltway in Houston, Texas, U.S.
- Leeds loop, a traffic distribution route in the city centre of Leeds, United Kingdom
- Loop Parkway, a spur of the Meadowbrook State Parkway on Long Island, New York, U.S.
- Massachusetts Route 213, a highway between I-93 and I-495 in Massachusetts, U.S.
- The Loop (Texarkana), a beltway around Texarkana, Texas and Arkansas, U.S.

=== Private transportation ===
- The Loop (Vegas), the Las Vegas Convention Center Loop people mover system

== Commerce and retail ==
- The Loop (Methuen, Massachusetts), a shopping center in Massachusetts, U.S.
- The Loop (Kissimmee), a strip shopping mall on the north side of Kissimmee, Florida, U.S.

== Organizations ==
- The Loop (organisation), a harm reduction organization based in United Kingdom.

== See also ==
- Loop (disambiguation)
- In the Loop (disambiguation)
- Out of the Loop (disambiguation)
