= Curucuru and Friends =

Animated television series

- Promotional Poster for the series, featuring the 5 main characters.
- Also known as: Tales of Greenery
- Hangul: 꾸루꾸루와 친구들
- RR: Kkurukkuruwa chingudeul
- MR: Kkurukkuruwa ch'in'gudŭl
- Genre: Animation; Preschool; Comedy; Slice of Life
- Developed by: Ffango Entertoyment
- Written by: Yi Jeong-Geun; Jang Eun-Ju (Season 1); Wáng Dìng Yī (Season 2)
- Directed by: Chung Hyun (Season 1); Wang Bo (Season 2)
- Starring: Choe Mun-Ja; Jeon Tae-Yeol; Hong Yeong-Lan; Choe Jeong-Ho; Gim Ok-Gyeong
- Opening theme: "Curucuru and Friends" by Ing Yeong-Hui, Yi Si-Nae and Lee Min-Jung
- Ending theme: "Curucuru Rhythm" by Ing Yeong-Hui
- Composers: Lee Sang-ho (Music Director); Gim Hui-Jip (Music)
- Countries of origin: South Korea; China
- Original languages: Korean; Mandarin (Season 2 and 3); English
- No. of seasons: 3
- No. of episodes: 65

Production
- Producers: Bak In-Sik; Dale D. Yoon
- Running time: 24 Minutes (First Season. Each Segment: 12 Minutes); 11 Minutes (Second Season)
- Production companies: Ffango Entertoyment (Season 1); Seoul Movie (Season 1); Beijing Pan Gaowen Media Ltd (Season 2 and 3); Zhejiang Chinese Cartoon Co. (Season 2 and 3)

Original release
- Network: KBS1
- Release: November 24, 2006 – November 23, 2016

Curucuru and Friends (Korean: 꾸루꾸루와 친구들; also known as Tales of Greenery or The Family of Greenwood (Chinese: 绿树林家族; pinyin: Lǜ shù lín jiāzú)) is a 2006 stop-motion animated series animated by Ffango Entertoyment (Now Comma Studios), primarily aimed for preschoolers. It is officially Ffango's first original stop motion animated series, directed by Chung Hyun and written by both Yi Jeong-Geun and Jang Eun-Ju with character designs by Jin Hyo-Jung.

The first season is aired KBS1 from November 24, 2006 to February 16, 2007, with a total of 13 episodes. A second season, made after the rights transfer, is then produced and aired in China, produced in a joint collaboration between Zhejiang Chinese Cartoon Co. and Beijing Pan Gaowen media Ltd from September 2013 to February 2014, with a total count of 26 episodes. A movie sequel titled Curucuru and Friends: The Rainbow Tree Forest (Korean: 꾸루꾸루와 친구들: 무지개 나무의 비밀; RR: Kkurukkuruwa chingudeul: mujigae namuui bimil) was released on Korean theaters on November 19, 2015. A third season of the series was released in 2016.

== Story ==
=== Season 1 ===
The story is set in a village called Green Forest Village, where is inhabited by friendly animals. The story were focused on 5 special animal friends whose friendship binds them together, Koori: A brown raccoon boy and an aspiring inventor, Pinpin: A blue and white giant panda boy and a warm hearted artist, Lalla: a pink Tabby cat girl and an aspiring musician who wishes to be a princess, Toto: a purple bat boy who wants to be a pilot and fly and lastly; Curucuru, a brown bear boy who likes to cook. All of them venture through several adventures in the forest and town, getting in and out of trouble as they learn valuable lessons in life and things around them.

=== Season 2 ===
Around the second season, the story revolves around the kids trying to foil the troublemaking duo Archie, a gray jackrabbit boy and Dangdang, a brown monkey boy who were trying to cause trouble in the Green Forest Village.

=== The Rainbow Tree Forest ===
The movie takes place between Seasons 1 and 2. The Green Forest Village hosts a festival in celebration of the 1000th anniversary of the large tree growing in the middle of the village. While Curucuru and his friends are helping in the festival, they learned that tree's vitality is due to a legendary item call the Pingya, which gives it Eternal Love and Life. But in the midst of the festival, a bunch of Pirate Hyenas came to the village and stole the legendary item, causing the tree to wilt. Now it's up to Curucuru and his pals to get it back from the pirates, before things can go worse. But amidst the actual troubles they face, the kids also encounter a strange Tiger child, who is connected to the incident.

== Cast ==
Curucuru (꾸루꾸루; Kkurukkuru)

Voiced by: Choe Mun-Ja (Season 1), Jo Hyeon-jeong (Movie)

The series's main protagonist, Curucuru is a brown bear boy who likes to cook but sometimes has tendencies to get hungry and eat anything. Despite being big, he's very lazy, sleepy and sometimes lack courage and tenacity but despite all of these, he is always supportive to all of his friends. He is also a very slow runner and has problems with his weight. He is best friends with Toto.

Koori (쿠리; Kuri)

Voiced by: Jeon Tae-Yeol (Season 1), Bak Sin-hee (Movie)

Koori is a brown raccoon boy who is well known as the town's aspiring inventor. Usually prideful, smart and always brags, his creations were a hit and miss when it comes to success. Somehow he never gives up on inventing and impressing his friends. He has a little sister named Haru and is also the oldest of the two siblings.

Lalla (랄라; Ralla)

Voiced by: Hong Yeong-Lan (Season 1), Lee So-eun (Movie)

Lalla is a pink Tabby cat girl and the only female member of the group, who is the village's aspiring singer. She likes to dance and perform but also doesn't want her private stuff to be touched. She's very posh, likes attention and likes to be pretty, but also very kind to her friends. She lives with her mother and shown to collect various types of dolls and cute stuff.

Pinpin (핀핀; Pinpin)

Voiced by: Choe Jeong-Ho

Pinpin is a blue and white giant panda boy who likes to paint and draw, considered as the Picasso of the Greenery Forest. He likes to paint and draw, thought sometimes has a hard time finding inspiration. He is very calm and also has a kind heart to everyone, thought also gets rather scared and saddened easily. He lives with his parents and often seeks advise to his grandfather, who lives near the lake.

Toto (토토; Toto)

Voiced by: Gim Ok-Gyeong (Season 1), Yuri Seo (Movie)

Toto is a purple bat boy who wishes to fly and also likes to become a pilot. The youngest member of the group, he is very curious, inquisitive and also very adventurous. However, for these traits, he can be very mischievous and sometimes stubborn on things. Despite being a bat, he somehow can't fly due to the lack wings. He is best friends with Curucuru.

Archie (Chinese: 阿奇; pinyin: Ā qí)

Voiced by: N/A

One of the characters debuting in season 2, Archie is a light gray jackrabbit boy who causes trouble to the children in the Green Forest Village. He is always accompanied by Dandan on their schemes.

Dangdang (Chinese: 当当; pinyin: Dāng Dāng)

Voiced by: N/A

Also a character debuting in season 2, Dandan is a brown monkey boy who also causes trouble to the children in the Green Forest Village. He always adores Archie on building up schemes.

== Episodes ==
=== Season 1 (2006–2007) ===
No.	Title	Original release date
1	"Friends of Greenery / We've got Pretty Flowers" (Japanese: Korean: 초록 숲 친구들 / Korean: 예쁜 길이 생겼어요)	24 November 2006
2	"Scary Play Mask / The Bird Chorus" (Japanese: Korean: 오싹오싹 가면놀이 / Korean: 새들의 합창)	1 December 2006
3	"What you said hurts / I want to get Slim" (Japanese: Korean: 내 말대로 이루어져요 / Korean: 날씬해지고 싶어요)	8 December 2006
4	"Know Know, Want to Know / Curucuru's a Sleepyhead" (Japanese: Korean: 알 알 무슨 알 / Korean: 꾸루꾸루는 잠꾸러기)	15 December 2006
5	"A Warm Snowy Day / The Moon gets Sick" (Japanese: Korean: 따뜻한 눈 내리는 날 / Korean: 달님이 아파요)	22 December 2006
6	"Where are you Wind? / I'm Sorry Lalla" (Japanese: Korean: 바람아 어디 있니? / Korean: 랄라야 미안해)	29 December 2006
7	"Koori the Great Inventor / It's ok, I'm right here!" (Japanese: Korean: 쿠리는 최고의 발명가 / Korean: 괜찮아, 내가 있잖아!)	5 January 2007
8	"Greenery Rescue Team / Lalla's Treasure Bag" (Japanese: Korean: 초록숲 구조대 / Korean: 랄라의 보물가방)	12 January 2007
9	"Happy Cooking Time / I Want to be a Mom" (Japanese: Korean: 즐거운 요리시간 / Korean: 엄마가 되고 싶어요)	19 January 2007
10	"Greenery Flower Festival / Happy Treasure Hunting" (Japanese: Korean: 초록숲 꽃축제 / Korean: 행복한 보물 찾기)	26 January 2007
11	"Pinpin in Wonderland / Find the Sound of Spring" (Japanese: Korean: 이상한 나라의 핀핀 / Korean: 봄의 소리를 찾아서)	2 February 2007
12	"The Candid Vacuum Cleaner / Toto's Birthday Party" (Japanese: Korean: 우당탕탕 청소기 / Korean: 토토의 생일파티)	9 February 2007
13	"The Little Magician / Lalla's Concert" (Japanese: Korean: 꼬마마술사 / Korean: 랄라의 음악회)	16 February 2007

== Development ==
Originating as a pilot film in 2003, the series was officially greenlit into an animated series in 2004. The series's development first began back in 2003 after the Ffango animation studio is renamed into Ffango Entertoyment. The series began as a pilot film selected by the Korea Creative Content Agency and Seoul Movie took interest in the series which got officially greenlit in 2004, with Government Donation and support by the Gyeonggi Digital Content Agency. In 2005, the series became one of KOCCA's Star Project and aired a year later on Korean Broadcasting System in November 24, 2006. The series was also broadcast in mainland China by China Central Television in 2008 under the name The Family of Greenwood. The second season is aired from September 2013 to February 2014 with support from both the China Film Group and Guangdong Alpha Animation & Culture Co., Ltd.

The series is animated using customized ball jointed puppets created by Thinking Hand Creative Studio and Darak Workshop with several expression faces made for each characters. Production took about 3 years total, making the puppets, backgrounds and scripts for each episode. Each scene and episode were shot using 100 Canon EOS-1D Mark II Stop Motion Control Cameras.

An official musical is also made for the series, which run in 2007 to 2011. However, in 2009 due to financial issues and company restructuring, the series rights is sold to China Film Group. In 2011, KOCCA stated that a theatrical film is currently in development alongside the second season. JeDae Moon stated that "Investment for the season 2 is ongoing in China and more success is expected. We believe we stepped off on the right foot with KOCCA's support." This is also the first time that KOCCA's OSMU (One Source Multi-Use) model has been taken up in a collaborative venture between Korea and China. A second season of the series was in the works in 2012 and aired between September 2013 to February 2014.

Iconix Entertainment currently handles the worldwide distribution rights of the series while Alpha Group Company distributes the series inside Mainland China after the rights transfer.

== Reception ==
Total Licensing Magazine stated that the series "is not didactic in its approach but, through animation in conveys originality, sociality and propriety in a way to interest the children."

=== Awards ===
The First season of the series won Grand Prize in the 2003 Seoul International Cartoon and Animation Festival, won best animation in the Gyeonggi Digital Art Center in 2004 and the 13th Korean Animation Awards for best animation in 2007. The series received the Golden Monkey Award in the 8th China International Animation Festival in 2012.
