= Loopy =

Loopy may refer to:

- Loopy (film), a 2004 American short film
- Loopy (puzzle), or Slitherlink, a logic puzzle developed by Nikolo
- Loopy (rapper) Lee Jin-yong (born 1987), South Korean rapper
- Loopy de Loop, an American animated TV series with an eponymous character
- Loopy, a fictional character in the animated TV show KaBlam!
- Loopy, a fictional character in the animated TV show Pororo the Little Penguin
- Loopy game, in combinatorial game theory
- Casio Loopy, a 1990s video game console

== See also ==
- Loop (disambiguation)
