= Looping =

Looping may refer to:

== Media and entertainment ==
- Loop (music), a repeating section of sound material
- Audio induction loop, an aid for the hard of hearing
- a film production term for dubbing (filmmaking)
- repeating drawings in an animated cartoon

== Other uses ==
- Looping (education), the practice of moving groups of children up from one grade to the next with the same teacher
- Loop (computing), a sequence of statements which is specified once but which may be carried out several times in succession
- Looping (yo-yo trick)
- Looping (video game), 1982 arcade game
- a specific type of roller coaster inversion
- an aerobatic maneuver
- a sociology term in a total institution in which an individual's protective response to one assault on the self is made the basis of another
- an ancient worldwide single element textile technique
- a primitive method of textile construction as used to create a bilum

== See also ==
- Loop (disambiguation)
