= In the Loop (disambiguation) =

In the Loop is a 2009 feature film directed by Armando Iannucci.

In the loop may also refer to:

- In the Loop with iVillage, a 2006–08 American television series
- a Minnesota Public Radio show associated with Public Insight Network
- an episode of 2004 TV series Powers
- Lyla in the Loop, a 2024 American children's animated television series created by Dave Peth and produced by Mighty Picnic and Pipeline Studios for PBS Kids

== See also ==
- The Loop (disambiguation)
