= Guardian Fairy Michel =

- 수호요정 미셸
- Directed by: Dong-Wook Lee
- Opening theme: Michel's Theme
- Ending theme: Black Hammers Theme
- Country of origin: South Korea
- Original language: Korean
- No. of seasons: 1
- No. of episodes: 26

Production
- Executive producer: Soo-Hyung Choi
- Producers: Young-Moon Min, Dong-Jo Shin, Jong-Il Choi, Sung-Il Ahn
- Running time: 20 min.
- Production companies: DR Movie; Iconix Entertainment

Original release
- Network: KBS
- Release: 6 June – 11 December 2003

Guardian Fairy Michel (Korean: 수호요정 미셸) is a fantasy-adventure TV animation produced by South Korean company DR Movie and Iconix Entertainment. The series aired on KBS in 2003, and consists of 26 episodes. The series was licensed and dubbed by ADV Films for English-speaking audiences.

== Plot ==
The series begins with an artifact being stolen from a museum by a group of thieves called the Black Hammer Gang. Following their escape, they are pursued by a young girl named Kim who wants to take her father's inventions (which the Black Hammer Gang had stolen) back from them. Kim chases the thieves until both the Black Hammer Gang and Kim fall on a strange island inhabited by fairies and its guardian Michel. The Black Hammer Gang tries to steal the life source of the island (and in essence the universe since the fairies represent nature) called the tree of life. Causing damage to the land and kidnapping the fairies, Michel and Kim have to combat the Black Hammer gang and take back the fairies in order to restore balance to nature.

== List of characters ==
=== Protagonists ===
==== Michel ====
Michel is the title character and male protagonist. The Guardian of the Tree of life and protector of the fairies, of nature, Michel is very kind hearted and has a great love for and respect for nature and also appears to possess some telepathic powers, being able to sense another person's thoughts and feelings just by touching another person's hand.

==== Kim ====
The series' main female protagonist. Kim first meets Michel after her plane crashes on the island, it is here where she meets the other fairies and sees the Tree of Life. Following the Black Hammer Gang's attack and the Tree of Life dying she and Michel set off to rescue the other fairies and save the Tree of Life. Following an attack on her father's lab by the Black Hammer Gang Salame stole one of her father's inventions, a space ship, which would later become their main base. As she escaped the laboratory was destroyed and Kim's father was presumably killed. As a result, she harbors a strong dislike for the black Hummer Gang and is determined to stop them no matter the cost. Kim is also the pilot of a small multipurpose aircraft which she calls Honeybee.

=== Antagonists ===
==== Lady Saleme ====
The leader of the Black Hammer Gang, who is obsessed with finding treasure. Saleme also gets very angry when things don't go her way and despises being called "old lady".

==== Boogy ====
The second in command of the Black Hammer Gang he is also presumably the oldest of the Spencer brothers.

==== Woogy ====
A member of the Black Hammer Gang. The second of the three Spencer brothers. big body and strong.

==== Meogy ====
A member of the Black Hammer Gang, something of an inventor for the Gang and is the only one to receive praise from Lady Saleme. The third of the three Spencer brothers. Familiar with making and handling machines.

==== Beaum ====
A strange snake like creature who once lived on the magical island but left it after joining the Black Hammer Gang, he has a strong dislike for Poyo whom he calls a bully. He is also one of the few members of the Black Hammer Gang to get any praise from Lady Saleme.

=== Fairies ===
==== Poyo ====
Among the four most powerful seasonal fairies among nature's fairies, he is a spring fairy. He is a curious and mischievous naughty boy. He's still young, so he doesn't have great abilities, but he's the most powerful of the seasonal fairies. His only thing he can say is "Auntie" and that's how he calls Salome.

==== Cittel ====
It is the fairy of Cittel Island itself. It has the shape of a sea turtle with a volcanic island on its back, and is the largest of the fairies and able to fly. After being turned into a monster by the Black Hammers and rescued, it mainly serves as a mortgage carrying Michelle and Kim, and others on their backs. Be well versed in the geography of many parts of the world.

==== Lina ====
A flower fairy resembling a rose, she is one of the few fairies not kidnapped by the Black Hammers. It has the ability to bring flowers to life and plays a role in delivering the story told by the Tree of Life to Michelle and Kim and others. Originally, she lived in a flowerpot, but after the tree of life became a seed, she gave up his flowerpot for the tree of life.

== Staff ==
- Executive Producer: Soo-Hyung Choi
- Scenario: Yasuhiro Imakawa
- Character Designers: Ki-Doo Kim, Dong-Joon Kim, Young-Cheol Park, Hyun-Joo Lee, Guen-Pyung Yuk
- Storyboards: Masayuki Kojima, Kwang-Seob Lee, Whan-Jing Kim, Kwang Jang, Hyun-Sun Lee
- Producers: Young-Moon Min, Dong-Jo Shin, Jong-Il Choi, Sung-Il Ahn
- Directed by Dong-Wook Lee

=== English Version Staff ===
- English Language & Subtitled Versions Presented by ADV Films
- Executive Producers: John Ledford, Mark Williams
- Produced & Directed by Sandra Krasa
- Production: ADV Studios
- Production Manager: Joey Goubeaud
- Project Translator: Junghee Cho
- ADR Script: Monica Rial, John Smith, Tiffany Grant (eps 20–26)
- Sound Design & Mix: Wade Shemwell
- Recording Engineer: Jon Duckworth
- Editors: Pat Givens, Robert Marchand
- Production Assistants: Miyuki Kamiya, Maki Nagano, Paul Maricle
- Michel © KBS/Iconix Entertainment/DR Movie
- English Language & Subtitled Versions © 2006 A.D. Vision, Inc.
