= Choi Jong-il =

South Korean businessman

Choi Jong-Il
- Born: November 5, 1965 (age 61)
- Occupations: President and CEO of Iconix Entertainment
- Years active: 1995–present
- Notable work: Pororo the Little Penguin; Tayo the Little Bus

Korean name
- Hangul: 최종일
- Hanja: 崔鍾日
- RR: Choe Jongil
- MR: Ch'oe Chongil

Choi Jong-il (born November 5, 1965) is a South Korean businessman who serves as the president and CEO of Iconix Entertainment. He is best known for creating the animated character Pororo, the Little Penguin.

== Pororo The Little Penguin ==
The character and its associated series have been distributed to 130 countries, gaining widespread international recognition.
