= List of Tayo the Little Bus characters =

Rogi, Tayo, Lani and Gani in a promotional image.

This is a list of all characters from the South Korean children's animated television series Tayo the Little Bus.

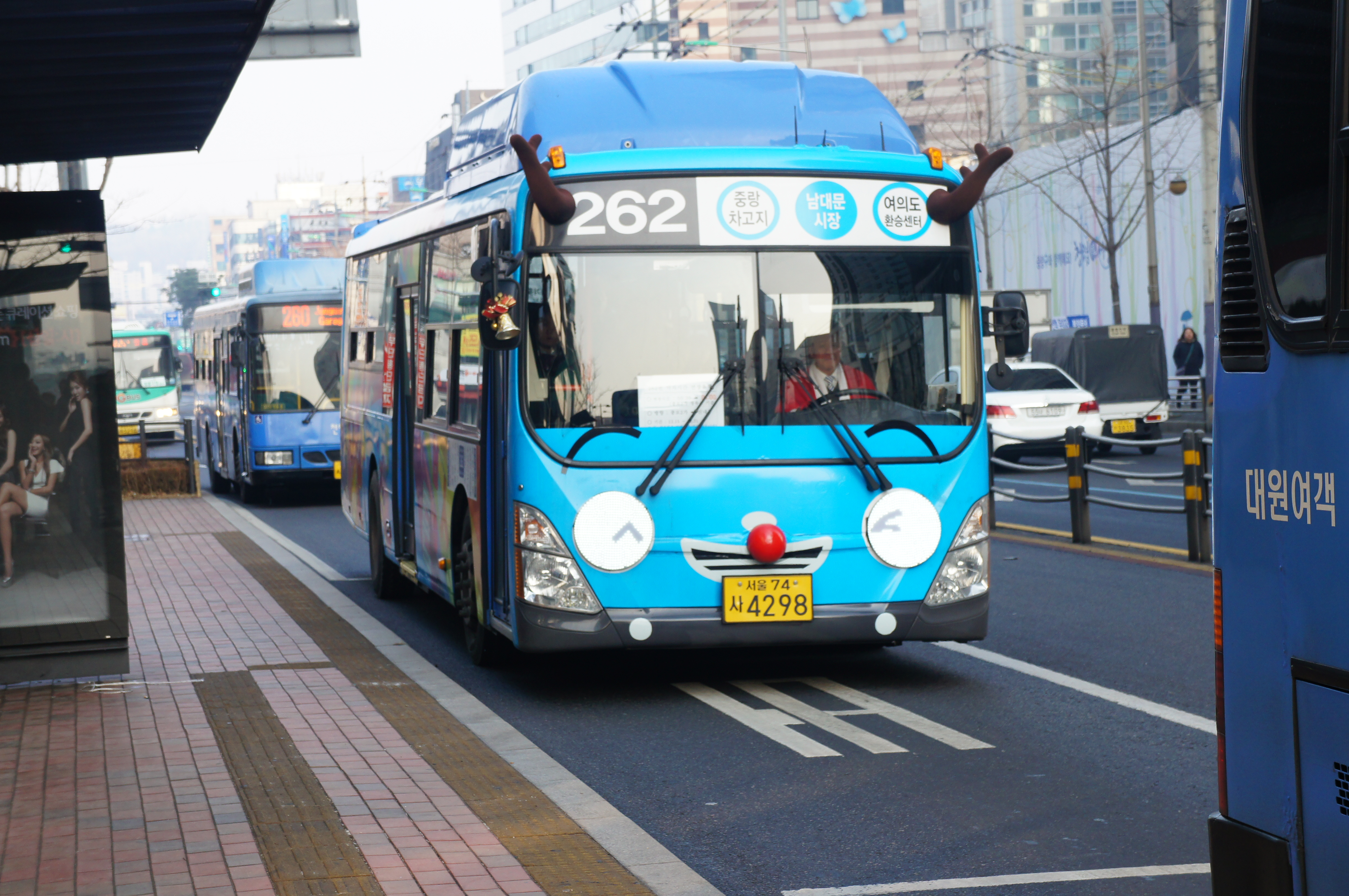
A bus in South Korea painted like Tayo

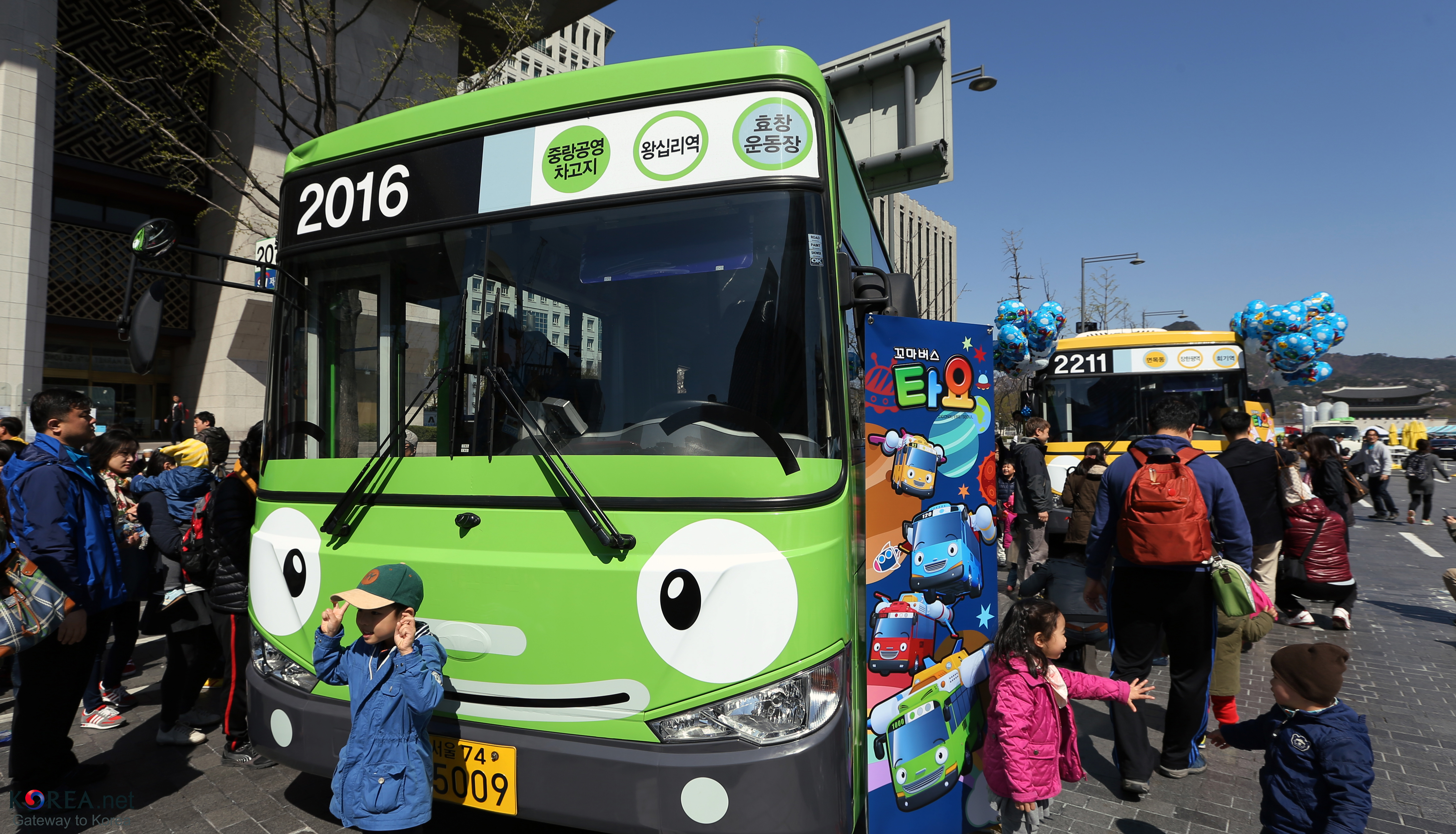
A bus in South Korea painted like Rogi

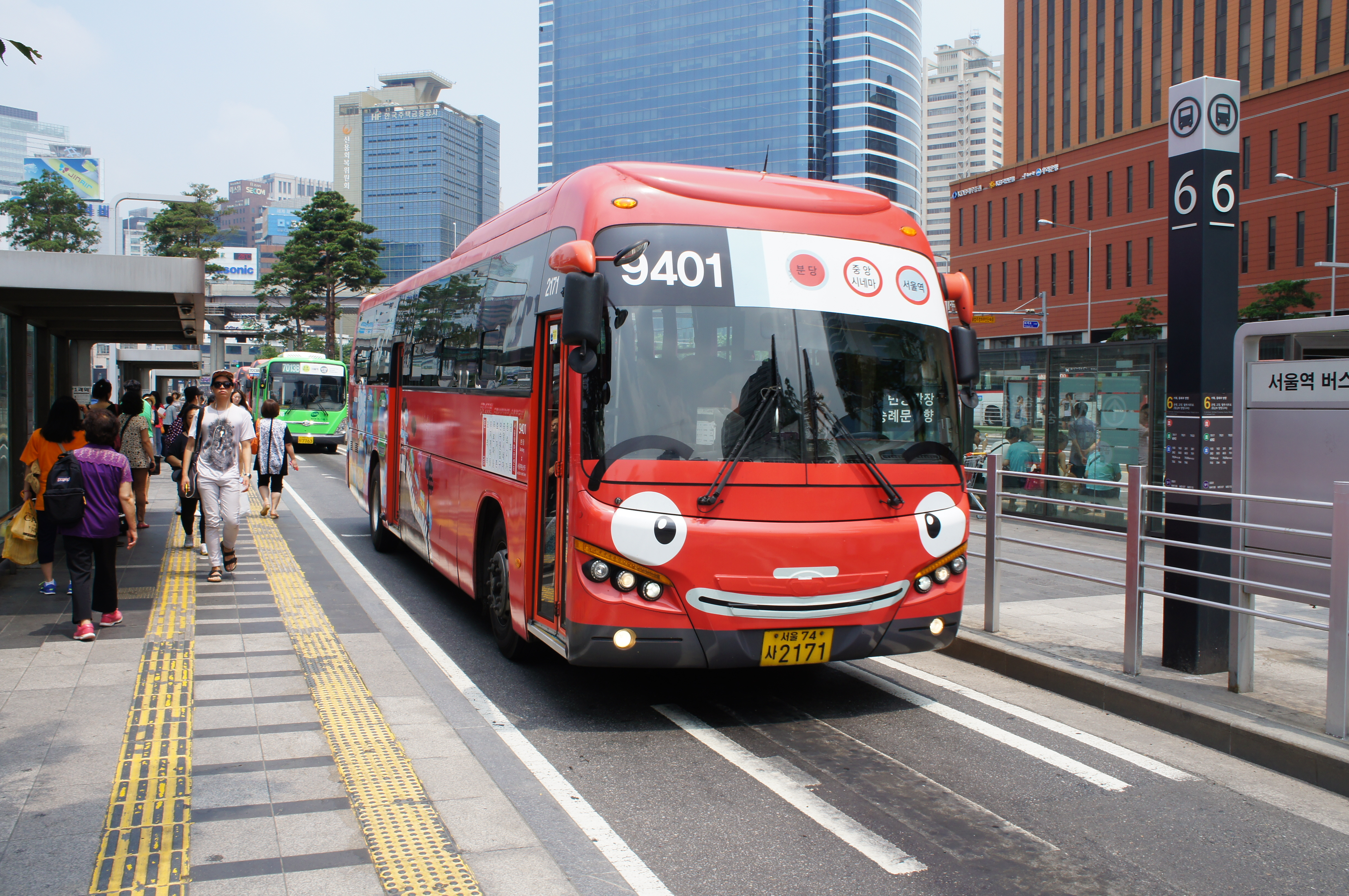
A bus in South Korea painted like Gani

== Buses ==
Name	Route number	Description	Voiced by
Tayo	120	Tayo is a playful city bus and the main character of the series. He made his debut in the Season 1 episode "A Day in the Life of Tayo".	Moon Nam-sook; Robyn Slade (seasons 1–4); Monique Dami Lee (season 5); Andrea Beto (season 6); Caroline Orejuela (seasons 7–present)
Rogi	1000	Rogi is a green bus. He made his debut in the Season 1 episode "A Day in the Life of Tayo".	Um Sang-hyun; Nolan Blazer (seasons 1–5); Andrei Ayson (season 6); Emerich Jimenez (seasons 7–present)
Gani	1339	Gani is a red city bus. He made his debut in the Season 1 episode "Our New Friend, Gani".	Jeong Jeong Silvers; Kerri Salki (seasons 1–5); Jay Santiago (season 6); William Savage (seasons 7–present); Laura E. Chinde (Tayo Spanish)
Lani	02	Lani is a yellow bus and a main character of the series. She made her debut in the Season 1 episode "A Day in the Life of Tayo".	Eun Yeong-seon; Kami Desilets (seasons 1–5); March Vargas (season 6); Meggie Elise (seasons 7–present)
Citu		Citu (also known as "Cito" in the first two seasons and in the seventh season) is a double-decker tour bus who debuted in the Season 1 episode "A Day in the Life of Tayo".	
Peanut	03	Peanut is an electric bus. He makes his first appearance in the Season 4 episode "Nice to Meet You, Peanut".	

=== Other buses ===
Name	Route number	Description
Bubba		Bubba is a senior bus who made his debut in the Season 2 episode "Cito's Secret". He used to scold and be very mean to Citu when he was little.
Kinder		Kinder is a preschool bus who made his debut in Season 4.
Cooku	031	Cooku is a countryside bus who lives in the countryside with Nana. He debuted in the Season 2 episode "Nana's Invitation".
Nana	082	Nana is a purple-and-white country bus. She and Tayo are good friends. Her debut is in the Season 2 episode "Nana Visits the City", in which she gets lost in the city.
Wondie		Wondie was a hardworking bus who is implied to have been retired and scrapped a year before the events of the first season. He was Hana and Citu's old friend.
Lolly		Lolly is a city tour bus who takes passengers around the city up to the mountain and at the museum. She gives lectures about the city. Her one and only episode that she appears is in the Season 5 episode "Lolly, The New City Tour Bus".
Stuart		Stuart is a school bus and minor character that only appears in Season 1.

== Construction vehicles ==
Name	Description
Max	Max is a dump truck who made his debut in the Season 1 episode "Good Friends".
Poco	Poco is an excavator who made his debut in the Season 1 episode "The Best Heavy Equipment".
Chris	Chris is a cement truck who made his debut in the Season 1 episode "The Best Heavy Equipment".
Billy	Billy is a yellow bulldozer who is in charge of the Construction Site.

== Space characters ==
Name	Description
Quick	Quick is a spaceship who debuted in the Season 2 episode "Tayo's Space Adventure Part 2". He resembles Speed.
Space Train	The Space Train is a character in space. It only appeared in the Season 2 episode "Tayo's Space Adventure Part 1".
Noah	Noah is a spaceship who debuted in the Season 2 episode "Tayo's Space Adventure Part 2". She resembles Nuri.
Bully	Bully is the leader of the Space Pirates and the main antagonist of the series. He made his debut in the Season 1 episode "Tayo's Space Adventure".
Wooly	Woolly is Bully's son. He first appeared in the Season 3 episode "Tayo's Earth Defense Plan 1", and he later re-appeared in the Season 7 episode "Wooly's Hide and Seek".
Bully's Gang	Bully's Gang are minor antagonists who are members of the Space Pirates. They first appeared in Season 2.

== Other vehicles ==
Name	Description
Nuri	Nuri is a cheerful taxi cab. She debuted in the Season 1 episode "A Day in the Life of Tayo".
Heart	Heart is a hatchback. She made her debut in the Season 3 episode "The New Friend, Heart". She is also Speed's love interest.
Iracha	Iracha is a clumsy and dimwitted pickup truck who debuted in the Season 1 episode "A Day in the Life of Tayo".
Big	Big is a container semi truck who made his brief appearance in the Season 1 episode "A Day in the Life of Tayo". He made his actual debut in "Afraid of the Dark".
Tony	Tony is an intelligent and diligent delivery truck and rapper. He made his actual debut in the Season 1 episode "I Want New Tires, where he is the main character.
Toto	Toto is a tow truck who debuted in the Season 1 episode "A Day in the Life of Tayo".
Carry	Carry is a car transporter of Bong Bong, Oli, Small, and Tiny. She also appears in the Tayo's Sing Along Show episode "Dreaming in the Clouds".
Speed	Speed (known as Speedy in the earlier episodes) is a supporting character who resembles a red Porsche 911.
Shine	Shine is a yellow-colored sport-luxury vehicle. He made his debut in the Season 1 episode "Let's Be Friends".
Long	Long is a container truck who made his debut in the Season 6 episode "You're Cool Just as You Are".
Rubby	Rubby is a street sweeper truck that cleans roads. He made his debut in the Season 2 episode "A New Playground!" and is one of the main characters in that season and the sixth.
Reo	Reo is a superstar car. He made his debut in the Season 3 episode "Gani the Super Star".
Ractor	Ractor (originally named as Larry) is a bright red tractor who lives in the countryside.
Champ	Champ is a old pickup truck who first appeared in Season 2
Ms. Teach	Ms. Teach is a car who made her debut in the Season 3 episode "A School Day". She is the teacher of the Car School.
Modi	Modi is an electric car. His best friend is Peanut.
Windy	Windy is a recreational vehicle (RV) who debuted in the Season 2 episode "Rogi's Special Guest".
Lift	Lift is an anthropomorphic forklift who debuted in the Season 1 episode "Going to Choo-Choo Town!".

== Rescue vehicles ==
=== Fire ===
Name	Description
Frank	Frank is a fire truck who made his debut as a cameo in the Season 1 episode "A Day in the Life of Tayo".
Noah	Noah is a rescue ambulance who debuted in the Season 7 episode "The Heroic Rescue Team". She is an ambulance, just like Alice.
Jessie	Jessie is a fire command vehicle who debuted in the Season 7 episode "The Heroic Rescue Team". She is the leader of the rescue team.
Tanker	Tanker is a water tanker truck who debuted in the Season 7 episode "The Heroic Rescue Team".

=== Police ===
Name	Description
Pat	Pat is a patrol car who made his debut in the Season 1 episode "A Day in the Life of Tayo". He is Rookie's police partner.

=== Ambulances ===
Name	Description
Alice	Alice is an ambulance who made her debut as a cameo in the Season 1 episode "A Day in the Life of Tayo".

=== Air vehicles ===
Name	Description
Air	Air is a rescue helicopter who made his debut in the Season 2 episode "Air, the Brave Helicopter".

== Baby Cars ==
Name	Description
Bong Bong	Bong Bong is a minivan who made his debut in the Season 2 episode "Tayo and Bong Bong". He, Oli, Small and Tiny are little boys.
Tiny	Tiny is a baby truck who made his debut in the Season 2 episode "Tayo and Bong Bong".
Small	Small is a baby taxi who made his debut in the Season 2 episode "Tayo and Bong Bong".
Oli	Oli is a baby car who made his debut as a cameo in the Season 2 episode "Tayo and Bong Bong".

== Trams and trains ==
Name	Route number	Description
Met	4553	Met is a subway train who debuted in the Season 1 episode "Rogi's Hiccups". Before this, he was mentioned in "A Day in the Life of Tayo".
Trammy	270	Trammy is a tram who debuted in Season 4 episode "Trammy's First Day at Work".
Titipo	No Route Number	Titipo is a train character from the spin-off TV series Titipo Titipo, who travels wherever the train tracks go. He debuted in Season 1 episode Getting Lost. He debuted in the main series' Season 5 episode "Tayo and Titipo's Race".
Diesel		Diesel is a train who hauls cargo at the quarry. He gives Tayo information on where to find Steam. He briefly appeared in the Season 5 episode "Tayo and Titipo's Race". He then debuted in Season 5 episode "Rogi and the Lucky Genie".
Fix		Fix is an anthropomorphic breakdown train who debuted in the Season 1 episode "Going to Choo-Choo Town!".
Boom-Boom		Boom-Boom is a playful little train who derailed in the Season 1 episode "Titipo's First Route".
Xing-Xing		Xing-Xing is a high-speed passenger train who debuted in the Season 1 episode "Going to Choo-Choo Town!".
Genie		Genie is the pink train that Tayo and her friends tell Rogi who they think is the lucky train in the Season 5 episode "Rogi and the Lucky Genie".
Eric		Eric is an older passenger electric locomotive who takes his job very seriously and as a result, has a hard time having fun with the other trains.
Setter		Setter is a diesel shunter who is very organized with his job. He debuted in the Season 1 episode "Titipo's First Route".
Danny		Danny is a blue track inspection diesel car who tries to calm Loco down during his night shift. He checks the rail at night in order to trains working during the day can runs safely. He often sleeps during the day because of his work.
Loco		Loco is a new friendly freight diesel locomotive who made his debut in the Season 1 episode "Our New Friend, Loco".
Manny and Berny		Manny and Berny is an anthropomorphic freight train twins who debuted in the Season 1 episode "There's Something About Manny".
Steam		Steam is a 4-4-0 steam locomotive and an old friend of Mr. Herb and Bubba. He debuted in the Season 5 episode "Bubba's Vacation".
Jenny		Jenny is a female diesel locomotive. She made her first appearance in the Season 2 episode "A Long Haul - Part 2". In the episode "Welcome, Jenny!", she comes to the train village. Prior to that, she had long-distance freight and passenger runs. So, she has knowledge of long-distance runs.
Super Z		Super Z is a super train who only appeared in the Season 2 episode "A Gift for Teo".
Megatrain	Megatrain is an anthropomorphic super train who debuted in the Season 3 episode "I Want to Be a Megatrain". He is the strongest train on Earth.	
Strong		Strong is an anthropomorphic freight train who debuted in the Season 3 episode "Diesel's Long Haul".
Green		Green is an anthropomorphic freight train who debuted in the Season 3 episode "It's Not Fair Manny!". She lives in the Jungle.
Packer		Packer is an anthropomorphic freight train who lives in the Desert. She debuted in the Season 3 episode "Superman Loco".
Gabriel		Gabriel is an anthropomorphic diesel locomotive who debuted in the Season 3 episode "I Want to Be a Megatrain".
Crimson		Crimson is an anthropomorphic thief train who debuted in the Season 3 episode "Detective Genie".
Ella		Ella is an anthropomorphic diesel locomotive who debuted in the Season 3 episode "Diesel's Mysterious Adventure Part 1".
Lord Greener		Lord Greener is an anthropomorphic diesel locomotive who debuted in the Season 3 episode "Diesel's Mysterious Adventure".
Walkie		Walkie is an anthropomorphic subway train who debuted in the Season 3 episode "Titipo's Special Friend".

== Drones ==
Name	Description
Momo	Momo is a yellow drone who debuted in the Season 7 episode "Momo and Bibi, the Flying Twins" alongside Bibi.
Bibi	Bibi is a blue drone who debuted in the Season 7 episode "Momo and Bibi, the Flying Twins" alongside Momo.

== Toy characters ==
Name	Description
Ace	Ace is a red toy sports car who was Duri's favourite toy and only appears in "The Tayo Movie Mission: Ace".
Melo	Melo is a musical car who debuted in the special "The Tayo Movie Mission: Ace".
Tori	Tori is the toy car with mouse/bear ears. He plays with Blo and meets Tayo, Duri, and Hana and he helps them rescue Ace. He made his debut in "The Tayo Movie Mission: Ace".
Blo	Blo is the toy army truck. His body resembles LEGO blocks. He made his debut in "The Tayo Movie Mission: Ace".
Bella	Bella is the main antagonist in "The Tayo Movie Mission: Ace". She is the queen of the Toyland. She used to be Hana's favourite toy.
Louie	Louie is an action figure doll who drives a sports car. He was Kevin's toy owner until he left him at the beach. Louie ends up in Toyland and is trying to get back home to his owner.
Grandpa Turtle	Grandpa Turtle is the turtle toy grandfather of his little turtles. He lives in Toyland with his little turtle boys.

== Human characters ==
Name	Description
Hana	Hana is a female mechanic who first appeared in Season 1. She is the daughter of Anne.
Duri	Duri is a boy who often rides on Tayo. His favorite superhero is Guardian X. He first appeared in "The Little Bus Is Leaving", the first episode of Tayo's Sing Along Show. He and Tayo try to be like Guardian X by helping other people in the city.
Rookie	Rookie is a local policeman. He sometimes goofs up with his job because he is new to it. He is currently the manager of the Emergency Center and was the only human working there until Jay was introduced.
Jay	Jay is a female rescuer who works at the Emergency Center. She made her debut in the Season 5 episode "New Rescuer, Jay".
Princess Ray	Princess Ray is a princess and the only space human from Planet Clover. She introduces herself to Tayo in "Tayo's Space Adventure" and is rescued by Tayo.
Asura	Asura is a little wizard from World of Magic. He appears in the Season 4 episode "Asura the Little Wizard" and spin-off series Tayo and Little Wizards.
Joey the Magician	Joey is a magician who was late from Tayo who decided to skip his stop. Joey gets bored waiting and a little girl comes and visits Joey who entertains the little girl. Tayo realizing his mistake rushes over to pick up Joey who entertains the guest. In Season 3, he is a circus clown.
Andy	Andy is a painter in the Season 2 episode "The Perfect Duo, Rookie and Pat", who was a criminal who vandalized the bus stations by painting graffiti on the walls. Lani talks to Andy about how she likes his art, but tells him drawing graffiti on bus schedules is wrong and how it confused passengers. Then Rookie spots Andy and chases after him until he gets caught by Pat the police car.
Teo	Teo is a Train mechanic at the Train Station. He appeared in the Season 5 episode "Tayo and Titipo's Race", where he paid Hana a visit.
Jenny	Jenny is a singer and a supporting character who first appeared in Season 4.
Jimmy	Jimmy is a guitarist that Peanut meets on the streets. While he's good playing the guitar, he can't sing and asks Peanut to find a singing partner, which Peanut finds in Jenny.
Mr. Herb	Mr. Herb is a train conductor who appeared in the Season 5 episode "Bubba's Vacation". Bubba visits Mr. Herb and Steam at the train station.
Anne	Anne is the mother of Hana. She is a paleontologist.
Guardian X	Guardian X is a superhero TV star from Season 5 in the episode "Surprise Gift for Duri" and is Duri's favorite superhero. Duri's father goes over to where Guardian X is filming and gets his autograph and a superhero costume for Duri's birthday.
Fireball	Fireball is a superhero who owns Nuri as Yellow Flash in the Season 1 episode "Nuri is a Superstar" and Fire Car in the Season 3 episode "City Heroes, Tayo & Duri". He was replaced by Guardian X in Season 5.
Maily	Maily is the Hollywood child star actress in the Season 5 episode "The Little Buses Go to America". She asks Tayo to help her get away from Black and his car agents.
Pepper	Pepper is a character who debuted in the Season 3 episode "New Conductor, Pepper!". She is the train conductor during long hauls.
