= Out of the Loop =

Out of the Loop may refer to:

- Out of the Loop (I Am the World Trade Center album), 2001
- Out of the Loop (Brecker Brothers album), 1994
- Out-of-the-loop performance problem

== See also ==
- The Loop (disambiguation)
