= Titipo Titipo =

South Korea animation series by Iconix Entertainment

- Country of origin: South Korea
- No. of series: 3
- No. of episodes: 78

Production
- Production company: Iconix Entertainment

Original release
- Network: Educational Broadcasting System
- Release: January 1, 2018 – May 30, 2022

Titipo Titipo (Korean: 띠띠뽀 띠띠뽀) is a South Korean animated television series produced by Iconix Entertainment, which first aired on the Educational Broadcasting System on 1 January 2018. The series has 3 seasons of 26 episodes each, for a total of 78. It has been dubbed in English since 30 May 2018, and subsequently in German, French, Arabic, Hindi and Russian.

The series focuses on Titipo, a little red diesel engine who wishes to become the best in the world.

== Characters ==
Name	Description
Titipo	Titipo is a passenger diesel locomotive. He debuted in Season 1 episode Getting Lost. He debuted in the main series' Season 5 episode Tayo And Titipo's Race.
Teo	Teo is a Train mechanic at the Train Station. He appeared in Season 5 episode "Tayo And Titipo's Race" when he paid Hana for a visit.
Diesel	Diesel is a freight diesel locomotive who hauls cargo at the quarry. He gives Tayo information on where to find Steam. He briefly appeared in Season 5 episode Tayo And Titipo's Race. He then debuted in Season 5 episode Rogi And The Lucky Genie.
Xing-Xing	Xing-Xing is a high-speed passenger train who debuted in Season 1 episode Going to Choo-Choo Town!. She debuted in the main series' Season 5 episode Tayo And Titipo's Race.
Genie	Genie is the pink electric train that Tayo and her friends tell Rogi who they think is the lucky train in Season 5 episode Rogi And The Lucky Genie.
Eric	Eric is an older passenger electric locomotive who takes his job very seriously and as a result, has a hard time having fun with the other trains.
Setter	Setter is a diesel shunter who is very organized with his job. He debuted in Season 1 episode Titipo's First Route.
Fix	Fix is an anthropomorphic breakdown train who debuted in Season 1 episode Going to Choo-Choo Town!.
Lift	Lift is an anthropomorphic forklift who debuted in Season 1 episode Going to Choo-Choo Town!.
Mr. Herb	Mr. Herb is a train conductor who appeared in Season 5 episode Bubba's Vacation. Bubba visits Mr. Herb and Steam at the Train Station.
Boom-Boom	Boom-Boom is a playful little train who derailed in Season 1 episode Titipo's First Route.
Danny	Danny is a blue track inspection diesel car who tries to calm Loco down during his night shift. He checks the rail at night in order to trains working during the day can runs safely. He often sleeps during the day because of his work.
Loco	Loco is a new friendly freight diesel locomotive who made his debut in Season 1 episode Our New Friend, Loco. In Tayo the Little Bus, he made his cameo appearance in Season 5 episode Tayo And Titipo's Race. He made his actual debut in Season 6 episode Please Take Care of the Cat..
Manny and Berny	Manny and Berny is an anthropomorphic freight diesel locomotive twins who debuted in Season 1 episode There's Something about Manny.
Steam	Steam is a steam locomotive and the old friend of Mr. Herb and Bubba. He debuted in Season 5 episode Bubba's Vacation.
Jenny	Jenny is a female diesel locomotive. She made her first appearance in Season 2. She first appeared in Season 2 episode A Long Haul - Part 2. In Season 2 episode Welcome, Jenny!, she comes to the train village. Prior to that, she had long-distance freight and passenger runs. So, she has knowledge of long-distance runs.
Super Z	Super Z is a super train who only debuted in Season 2 episode A Gift for Teo.
Megatrain	Megatrain is an anthropomorphic super train who debuted in Season 3 episode I Want To Be a Megatrain. He is the strongest train on Earth.
Strong	Strong is an anthropomorphic freight diesel locomotive who debuted in Season 3 episode Diesel's Long Haul.
Green	Green is an anthropomorphic freight diesel locomotive who debuted in Season 3 episode It's Not Fair Manny!. She lives in the Jungle.
Packer	Packer is an anthropomorphic freight train who lives in the Desert. She debuted in Season 3 episode Superman Loco.
Gabriel	Gabriel is an anthropomorphic diesel locomotive who debuted in Season 3 episode I Want To Be a Megatrain.
Crimson	Crimson is an anthropomorphic thief train who debuted in Season 3 episode Detective Genie.
Ella	Ella is an anthropomorphic diesel locomotive wearing #5 who debuted in Season 3 episode Diesel's Mysterious Adventure Part 1.
Lord Greener	Lord Greener is an anthropomorphic racing diesel locomotive who debuted in Season 3 episode Diesel's Mysterious Adventure.
Walkie	Walkie is an anthropomorphic subway train who debuted in Season 3 episode Titipo's Special Friend.
Pepper	Pepper is a character who debuted in Season 3 episode New Conductor, Pepper!. She is the train conductor during long hauls.

== Reception ==
The website Gizmo Story recommends the series, that they found it "filled with morals and fun with diaphanous humor." Animation Magazine also praised the series for the same reason: "The series is produced to teach young viewers about facing social situations in their daily lives and build essential life skills."

== See also ==
- Tayo the Little Bus
- List of Tayo the Little Bus Characters
