= Iconix Entertainment =

South Korean animation studio

- Logo used since 2014
- Native name: (주)아이코닉스
- Type: Limited liability company
- Industry: Entertainment
- Founded: 25 September 2001; 25 years ago
- Founder: Choi Jong-il
- Headquarters: Seoul, South Korea, Korea
- Area served: Worldwide
- Website: Iconix Entertainment Homepage

Iconix Co, Ltd. (Korean: ㈜아이코닉스) is a South Korean Production and Computer animation studio based in Seoul, and is a major South Korean entertainment company formed by the merger of Iconix. The company is commonly referred to as simply "Iconix", the same name used in previous incarnations of Iconix.

Iconix also licenses anime for Korean releases and produces animated TV shows; these range from a South Korean dub of Toei Animation's Ojamajo Doremi, and Korean series Michel. Iconix is jointly owned by the animation companies Toei Animation, SK Broadband, Ocon Animation Studio, Roi Visual, and DR Movie.

== History ==
Iconix Entertainment was founded on September 25, 2001 by Choi Jong-il.

== Properties ==
Animated titles from Iconix include Pororo the Little Penguin, Tai Chi Chasers, Tayo the Little Bus, Restol, The Special Rescue Squad, and Ricky & Ralph, among others. It also handles distribution licensing for the following:

- Pororo to the Cookie Castle
- Dinga
- Chiro and Friends
- Woobiboy
  - Hello, Woobiboy
- Bistro Recipe
- Ojamajo Doremi (dubbed)
  - Mo~tto! Ojamajo Doremi
  - Ojamajo Doremi Dokkān
- Tumoya Island
- Spheres
- Tayo the Little Bus
  - Titipo Titipo (spinoff)
- Tai Chi Chasers
- Nalong, Fly to the Sky
- Flowering Heart
- Color Crew
- Wild Instrict
- Lotty Friends
- Turtle Hero
- Art Odyssey
- Tayo's Big Trip
- Lupo Alberto
- Bruno Bozzetto's The Spaghetti Family
- Curucuru and Friends
- Petit Petit Muse

== See also ==
- Sunwoo Entertainment
- Educational Broadcasting System
