= The Loop (organisation) =

Non-profit organization in the United Kingdom

- The Loop Drug Checking Service
- Formation: 2014 (12 years ago)
- Type: Nonprofit
- Registration no.: 1200533
- Legal status: Registered charity
- Purpose: Harm reduction, advocacy
- Location: United Kingdom
- Services: Event-based drug checking and harm reduction services
- Staff: 5
- Volunteers: c. 350
- Website: https://wearetheloop.org/

The Loop, formally known as The Loop Drug Checking Service, is a non-profit organisation focused on harm reduction through drug checking services based in United Kingdom (UK). It was established by professionals working in drug treatment, chemistry, and the music industry, with the aim of implementing harm reduction strategies in response to drug use at festivals.

== History ==
The organisation originated from Professor Fiona Measham's involvement in the English Festival Study, which examined drug use at UK music festivals starting in 2010. Through collaboration with event managers, public health officials, and law enforcement, she explored the potential for onsite drug testing as a harm reduction measure. The Loop was set up with Measham and her close friends as a community interest company to implement this approach.

The Loop, in partnership with Home Office Forensic Early Warning System resources, provided the UK's first event-based onsite drug testing and harm reduction services, which was first provided in 2013.

As of 2025, The Loop, is legally registered as a charity as The Loop Drug Checking Service, since September 2022.

== Organisation ==
The Loop operates with a core staff, led by a CEO and overseen by a board of trustees. The organisation is primarily supported by a volunteer workforce, which includes a senior volunteer team and a general volunteer team of around 300 individuals. Volunteers include chemists, health and social care professionals, researchers, and academics.
