= Bak Sin-hee =

South Korean voice actress

Bak Sin-hee (Korean: 박신희) is a South Korean voice actress who began her career as a voice actress by joining Daekyo Broadcasting Corporation at a workout at the end of 2000.

She joined the Munhwa Broadcasting Corporation's voice acting division in 2002 and achieved stardom as a freelancer in MBC's Magical DoReMi as "Na Mo Mo". She joined the Korea Voice Performance Association in 2005. Currently, Bak is cast in the Season 2 of Korea TV edition of 24 as Megan Matheson, replacing Skye McCole Bartusiak. She is also the voice of the navigation product Navi by Hyundai Autonet.

== Roles ==
=== Broadcast TV ===
- 24 (replacing Skye McCole Bartusiak, Korea TV Edition, MBC)
- Ojamajo Doremi (Magical Remi) from 2nd Series and 3rd Series, Korea TV Edition, MBC)
- CSI: Crime Scene Investigation (extra guest, Korea TV Edition, MBC)
- CSI: Miami (extra guest, Korea TV Edition, MBC)
- Stupid Puccini (Korea TV Edition, MBC)
- Flower Outline Men (Korea TV Edition, MBC)
- Stuart Little (Korea TV Edition, MBC)
- Smallville (extra guest, Korea TV Edition, MBC)
- Frog Magical (Daekyo Broadcasting Corporation)
- Little Truck Trio (Daekyo Broadcasting Corporation)
- Adventure King (Daekyo Broadcasting Corporation)
- Hit 50 Years (Radio Drama, MBC)

=== Film dubbing ===
- What Women Want (extra guest, Korea TV Edition, MBC)
- The Addams Family (extra guest, Korea TV Edition, MBC)
- Unagi (extra guest, Korea TV Edition, MBC)
- Ring (extra guest, Korea TV Edition, MBC)
- Vanilla Sky (extra Guest, Korea TV Edition, MBC)

=== Video games ===
- MapleStory - Mercedes (female), Kaiser (female), Evan (female), Lilin, Lania (Heroes of Maple),
- Genshin Impact - Yoimiya (female)
- Cookie Run: Kingdom - Cocoa Cookie (female)
- Blue Archive - Sorasaki Hina (female), Ajitani Hifumi (female)

=== Community involvement ===
- Country Report (KTV)
- Valance Generate (KTV)
- Change Korea (KTV)
- Samsung Companion Broadcaster

=== Other voices ===
- Yoon's English
- Tuntun English
- Bean and Ground (Baby Edu instrument)
- Hyundai Autonet Navigation
- Frog Magical (Daekyo Broadcasting Corporation, Song record, Opening and Ending)
- Akubi (Daekyo Broadcasting Corporation, Song record, Opening and Ending)
- Magical DoReMi (Korea TV Edition in Song record, Ending, MBC)

== See also ==
- Munhwa Broadcasting Corporation
- MBC Voice Acting Division
