= Inner loop (disambiguation) =

Inner loop may refer to:

- Inner loop in computer programs
- Inner Loop (Phoenix), a section of Interstate 10 in downtown Phoenix, Arizona, United States
- Inner Loop (Rochester), an expressway around downtown Rochester, New York, United States
- Inner Loop (Washington, D.C.), a previously proposed freeway loop in Washington, D.C., United States
- Inner–outer directions, where "inner loop" is used to describe the clockwise traveling lanes of a roadway
  - This usage of "inner loop" is commonly applied to the clockwise roadway of Interstate 495 (Capital Beltway)
- Interstate 610 (Texas), the innermost highway loop around the central area of Houston, Texas, United States
- A freeway loop in Nashville, Tennessee, that consists of sections of I-24, I-40, and I-65
