= Looping (education) =

Practice of a teacher remaining with the same student group for more than one school year

Looping in education is the practice of moving groups of children up from one grade to the next with the same teacher. For example, a teacher who teaches a third grade class and then goes on to teach the same students, the following year, for the fourth grade. This system, which is also called multiyear grouping, lasts from two to five years and, as the class moves on, the teacher loops back to pick another group of children. This practice is particularly prevalent in Europe and Asia.

This is distinct from the teacher of a multi-age class, who teaches a specific range of school grades together. In this case, although each child remains with the same teacher for multiple years, the group of students being taught changes annually as older children leave the group and are replaced by younger students entering.

== Background ==
It is believed that young learners experience a complex period of development and that it requires consistency, which can be provided by the looping learning framework. Looping allows teachers to address this issue by providing continuity as well as a stable and secure learning environment. It had its origin in Waldorf education, where the traditional goal has been for a primary teacher to remain as the lead teacher of a class for eight consecutive years, though in conjunction with numerous specialized teachers;. Waldorf education spread in the United States in 1928 after it was first introduced in Europe. During the 19th and early 20th centuries, the looping system was implicit in the educational structure, particularly in one-room schools where there was only one teacher available for all students.

== Advantages ==
Teacher looping offers several benefits to education, including behavioral, emotional, and academic.

- One of the main benefits of teacher looping the large amount of added instructional time at the beginning of each school year. Without having to reestablish classroom rules and routines with a new group of students at the beginning of each year, teachers are able to jump into the curriculum much earlier in the year than typical teachers. There is a direct correlation between the amount of time spent establishing the classroom environment and amount of curriculum covered in a single school year. Students are often more prepared for the next academic grade at the end of a year in which they were taught by a looping teacher.
- Another major benefit is the individualization looping allows. Teacher looping increases teachers’ knowledge of each student’s academic strengths and weaknesses on a level that is impossible to achieve in a single year. Teachers are given the opportunity to understand each of their students’ needs and learning styles on a deeper level than traditional teachers get to. The extended amount of time spent getting to know and assess their students provides teachers a detailed conception of how to alter their instruction to accommodate each student.
- A key benefit of looping is the strong relationships between students, parents, and teachers that are built. The foundation of teaching lies in the trust students, and their parents, have for the teachers responsible for their education. When a close relationship is formed between students and their teacher, students feel a sense of stability in the classroom. This allows quieter students to become comfortable within the classroom climate and boundary-pushing students to get used to consistent expectations along with empathize with their teacher. Teachers who loop have reported improvement in classroom discipline.
- Not only does looping strengthen the bond between teachers and their students, but amongst the students themselves. Getting to spend multiple years with the same group of students allows students to deepen their bond with one another. This can improve conflict resolution and teamwork capabilities in the classroom.
- In addition to such emotional and behavioral benefits, students are academically supported by looping as well. Increased comfortability in the classroom leads students to higher levels of participation, risk-taking, and higher-order thinking. Attendance is typically higher for classes who are looped compared to those who are not. Lastly, many studies have found that looping is associated with higher performance levels in reading and math.

== Disadvantages ==
Potential disadvantages of looping include:

- Restricting the ability of teacher to perfect a lesson through repetition
- Conflict/tension between students and teachers is not always resolved
- Lapses in an instructor's teachings aren't necessarily corrected later on by a different instructor
- A single teacher defines the character of the individual class, meaning each class carries with it its own unique and observable strengths and weaknesses throughout the looping grades.
