= Tayo the Little Bus =

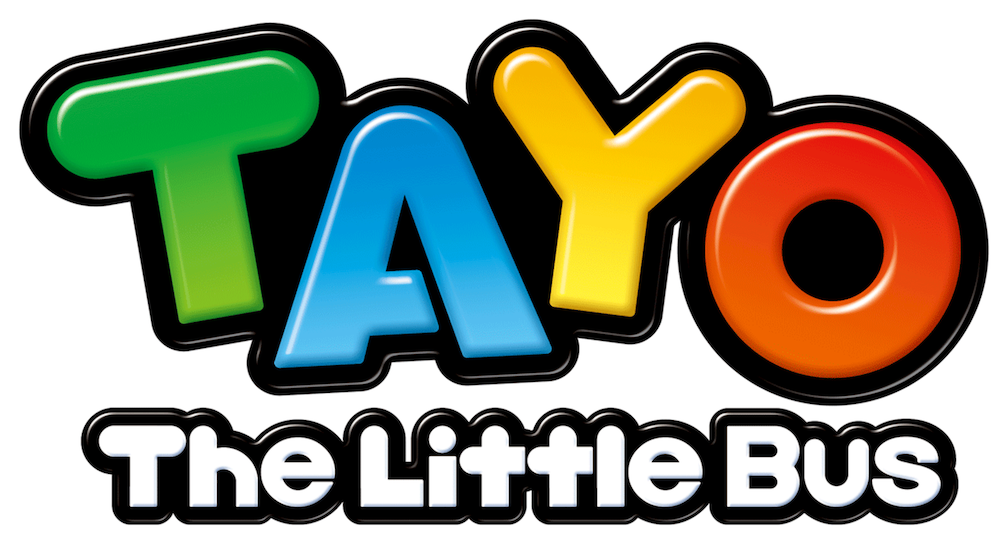
- English logo
- Genre: Children's series Comedy; Educational; Preschool
- Written by: Choi Jong-il
- Directed by: Kim Min-sung, Shin Chang-hwan, Song In-Uk
- Presented by: Rar Sae-Ha
- Starring: Meara
- Voices of: English: Robyn Slade; Nolan Balzer; Kami Desilets; Tea Wagner; Kerri Salki; Jolie L'Esperance
- Narrated by: Heather Madill
- Opening theme: "Tayo the Little Bus Theme Song"
- Ending theme: "Vroom, Vroom, Vroom!"
- Country of origin: South Korea
- Original languages: Korean; English
- No. of seasons: 8
- No. of episodes: 208

Production
- Running time: 10–11 minutes per episodes
- Production companies: Iconix Entertainment; Educational Broadcasting System; Seoul Metropolitan Government

Original release
- Network: EBS; Disney Junior (Asia)
- Release: 23 August 2010 – present

Related
- Titipo Titipo

Tayo the Little Bus (Also Spelled TAYO or Tayo) (Korean: 꼬마버스 타요; RR: Kkomabeoseu Tayo) is a South Korean animated television series. The series was created by Iconix Entertainment. Each episode in the start, middle, and end features a brief narration, and it has eight seasons. A spin-off series of Tayo, known as Titipo Titipo, premiered between the main series' fourth season and fifth season. Titipo focuses on the titular character named Titipo, a young passenger train the show is named after along with all his friends, who are also trains. After the end of Titipo's first season, Tayo's fifth season premiered for English-speaking audiences on October 22, 2018. Titipo Titipo was greenlit for a second season. Titipo's second season premiered for English-speaking audiences starting November 19, 2020. In late 2020, Tayo the Little Bus' 10th anniversary spinoff Tayo and Little Wizards (마법버스 타요) was released. This spinoff premiered on Netflix on September 17, 2021. The sixth season aired on September 1, 2021.

The series is available in Korean, English, Spanish, Japanese, Mandarin, Turkish, Indonesian, Malay, Thai, German, Bulgarian, and Russian on the production company's official YouTube channel for the series.

== Characters ==
=== Main characters ===
The series features five main characters. Each of the four original characters (Tayo, Gani, Lani & Rogi) is based on the four actual colors and types of Seoul Buses.

- Tayo is a friendly, playful, and sometimes mischievous blue bus. He is the 3rd-largest and 3rd-oldest of the four buses. In the fourth-season episode, Who Is The Real Tayo?, it is revealed that he has a clone of his named Star Tayo, which was in one of his dreams. Tayo also appears as a minor character in the Titipo Titipo series and has appeared in the Season 1 episodes: Going to Choo-Choo Town, Genie Makes a New Friend, and Titipo and Tayo. For Season 2, he appeared in the episodes: A Long Haul: Part 1, Fix and Lift's Music Battle, Loco the Fabulous Freight Train, Oh Please, Genie, Diesel and Rogi and Genie's New Friend.

Voiced by

- Robyn Slade (A Day in the Life of Tayo (2010) - The Little Buses' Play (2016))
- Monique Dami Lee (Emergency Dispatch! Tayo and Gani (2018) - The Little Dinosaur Friend: Part 2 (2019))
- Andrea Beto (You're Cool Just as You Are (2022) - A Festival for Everyone (2022))
- Caroline Orejuela (Gani, Let's Play Together! (2024) - present)

- Rogi is conceited, outgoing, and also mischievous, but he is a good-hearted green bus. Although, he and Tayo often get into fights with each other. Funny and mischievous himself, Rogi also has an interest in detective work, as can be seen in episodes like Rogi the Detective! and Prank Call Madness. Rogi appeared in Titipo Titipo's second-season episodes: Oh Please, Genie, Diesel and Rogi and Genie's New Friend.

Voiced by

- Um Sang-hyun
- Nolan Blazer (A Day in the Life of Tayo (2010) - The Little Dinosaur Friend: Part 2 (2019))
- Andrei Ayson (You're Cool Just as You Are (2022) - A Festival For Everyone (2022))
- Emerich Jimenez (Gani, Let's Play Together! (2024) - present)

- Lani is a cute girl, cheerful, kind, and sweet-nature yellow bus. However, she is also timid, sensitive, and temperamental. Possessing little tolerance for arguments, she often acts as a mediator between Tayo and Rogi. She is the smallest and youngest of the four buses and is often considered the cute one of the group. Lani appeared in the second-season episodes of Titipo Titipo: Fix and Lift's Music Battle, Welcome, Jenny and Oh Please, Genie.

Voiced by

- Eun Yeong-seon
- Kami Desilets (A Day in the Life of Tayo (2010) - The Little Dinosaur Friend Part 2 (2019))
- March Vargas (You're Cool Just as You Are (2022) - A Festival For Everyone (2022))
- Meggie Elise (Gani, Let's Play Together! (2024) - present)

- Gani is a hardworking, warm-hearted, and shy, while also slightly timid and insecure red bus. He is the largest and oldest of the four buses and often acts as the most mature one of the group. Gani appeared in Titipo Titipo's second-season episodes: Oh Please, Genie and Diesel and the Baby Cars.

Voiced by

- Jeong Jeong Silvers
- Kerri Salki (Our New Friend, Gani (2010) - The Little Dinosaur Friend Part 2 (2019))
- Jay Santiago (You're Cool Just as You Are (2022) - A Festival For Everyone (2022))
- William Savage (Gani, Let's Play Together! (2024) - present)
- Laura E. Chinde (Tayo Spanish (2020) - YouTube Series (2021))

- Peanut is an electric city and tour bus that is good-natured and mellow. As he is shaped just like a peanut on the top, he gains this name. He can cause mischief sometimes, but is a very kind bus. He was introduced in Season 4 along with the city tram, Trammy.
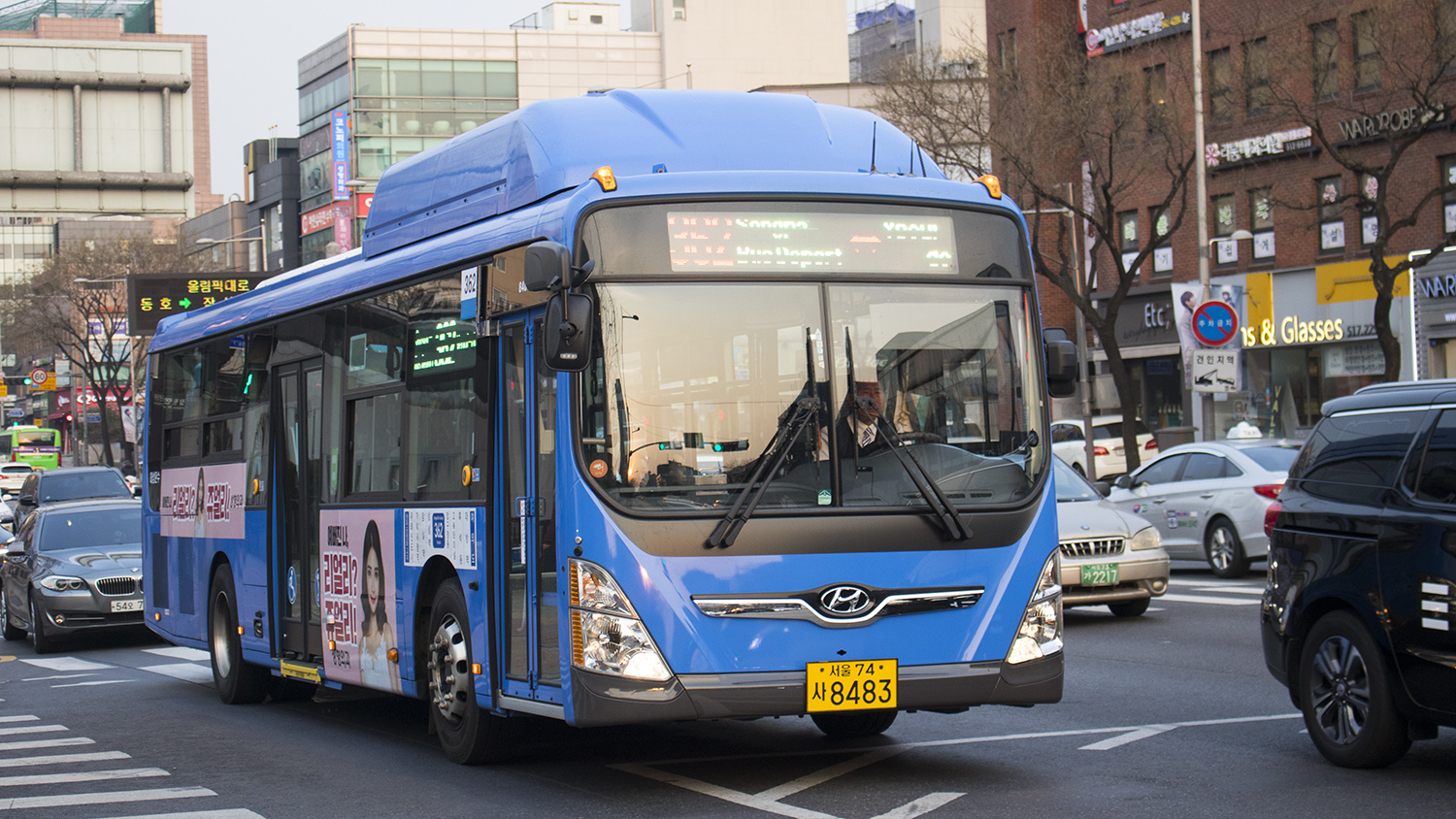
Tayo (Hyundai Aero City)

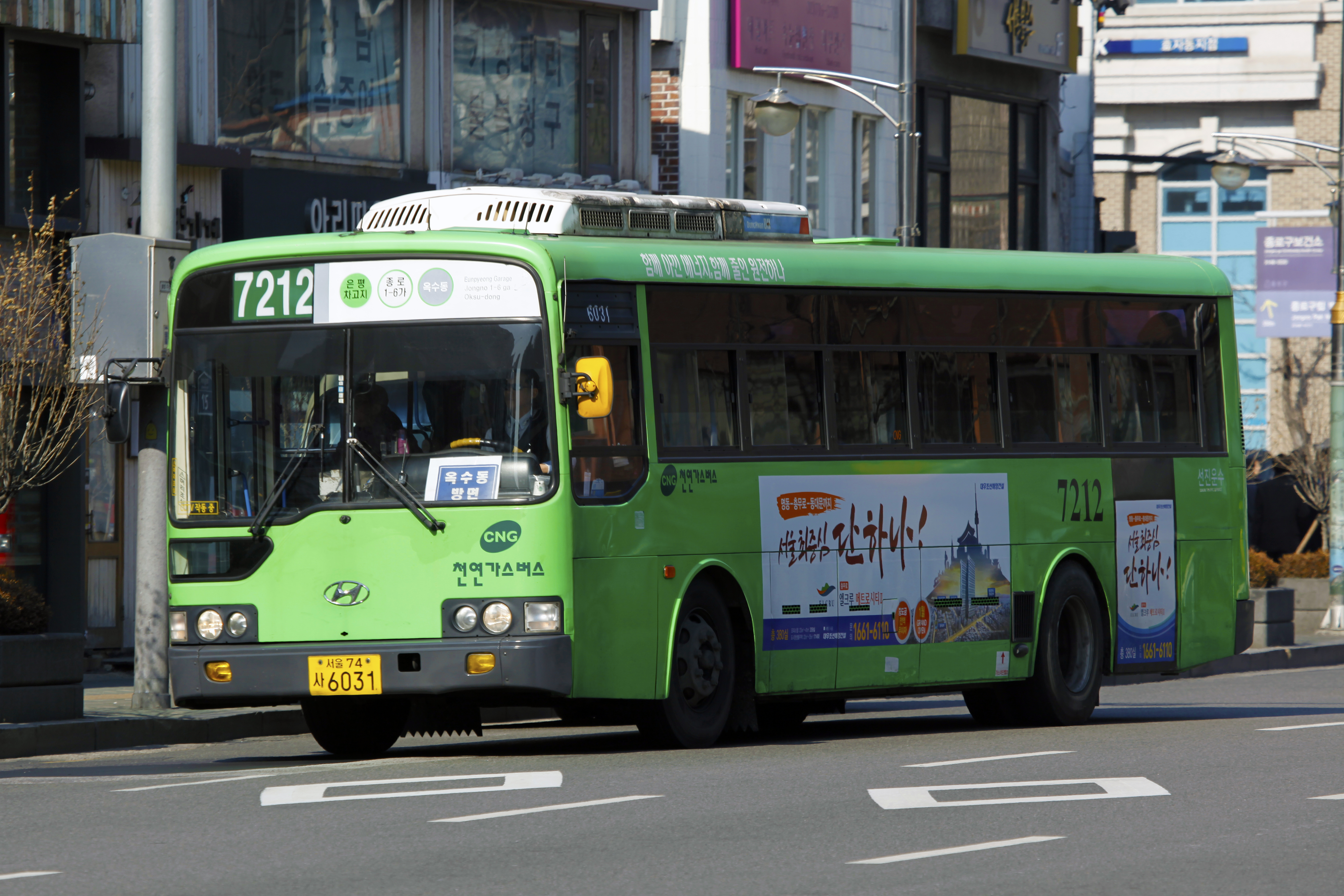
Rogi (Hyundai Aero City)

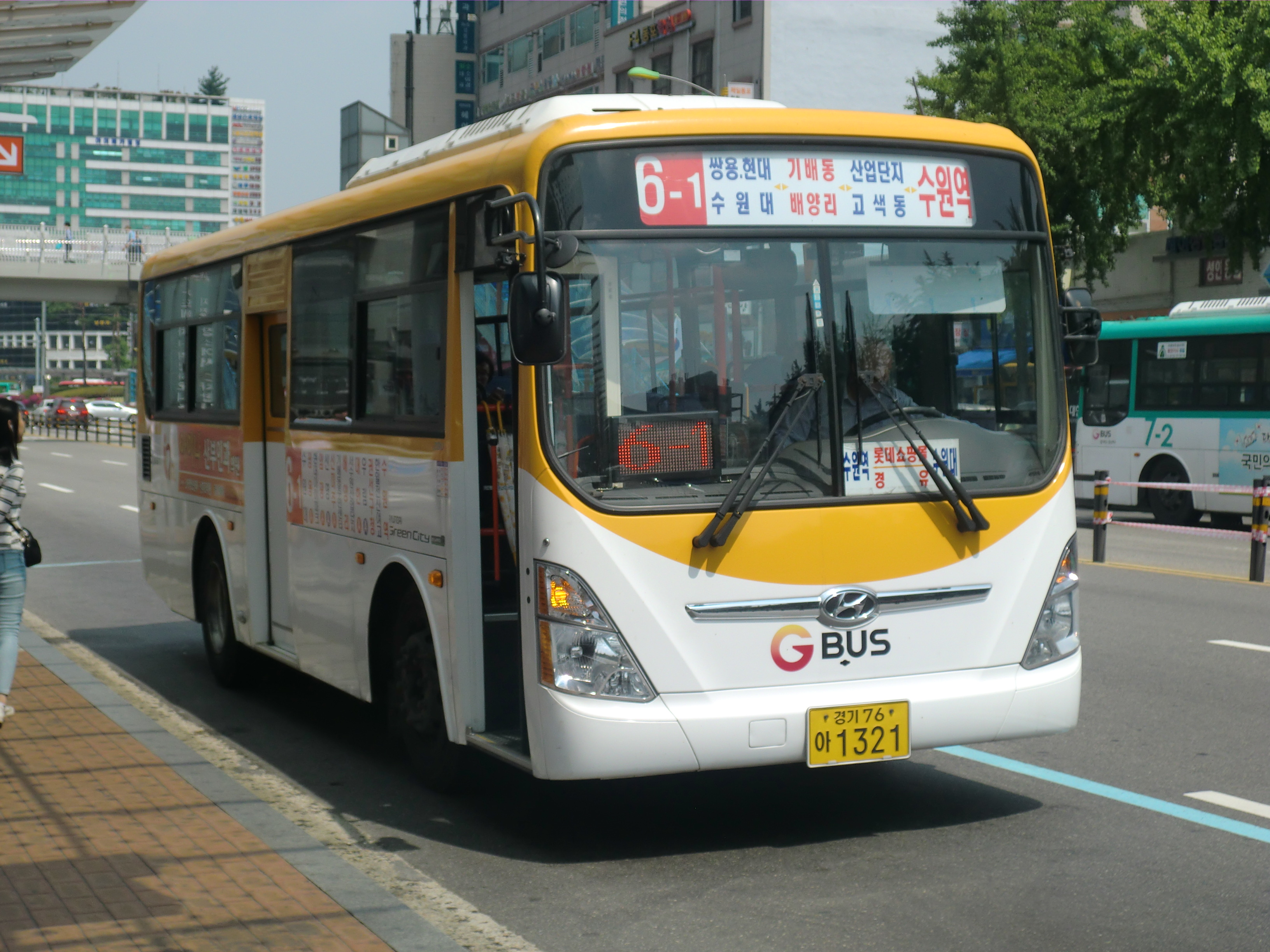
Lani (Hyundai Green City)

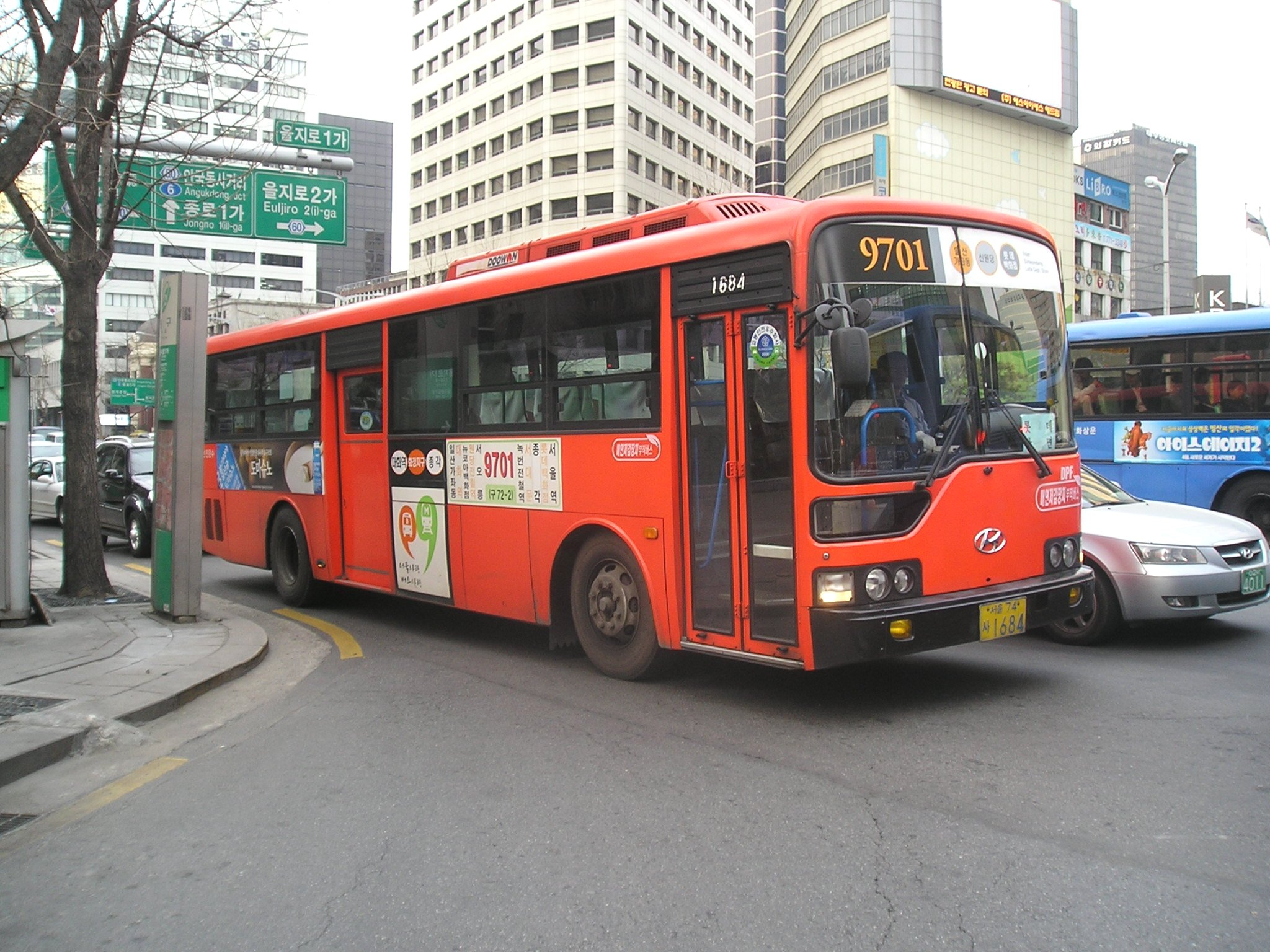
Gani (Hyundai Aero City)

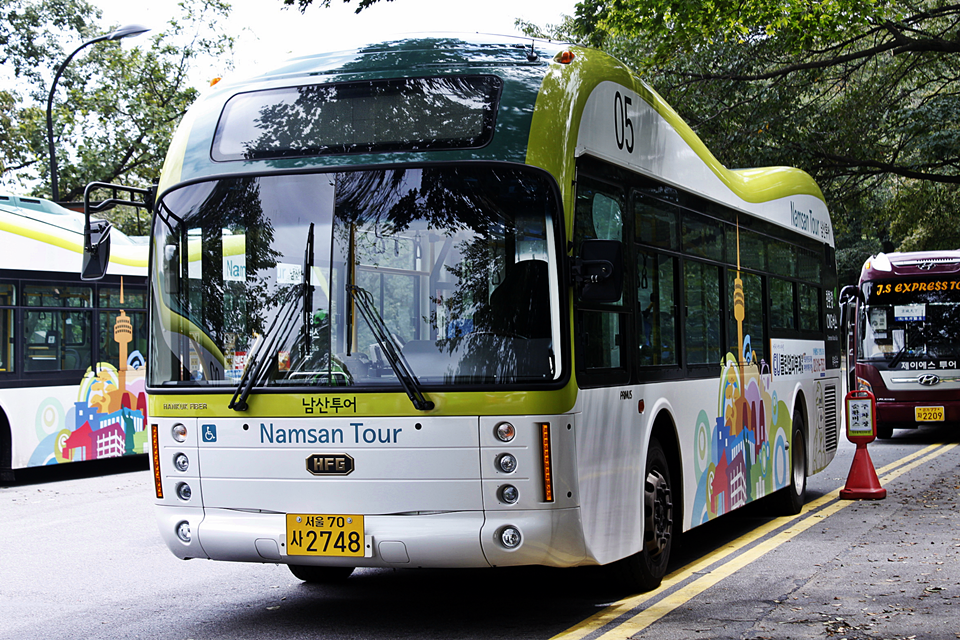
Peanut (Hankuk Fiber Primus)

== Reception ==
Melissa Camacho of Common Sense Media gave the show four stars out of five, stating that the "Animated charmer features positive messages -- and farts."

At a Vietnamese seminar for addressing the struggles of the Vietnamese animation industry, Korean animators named Tayo the Little Bus, a series that has been "dominating" the Korean market. These animators also noted that the series is popular in China, Thailand, and Vietnam.

== Cultural impact ==
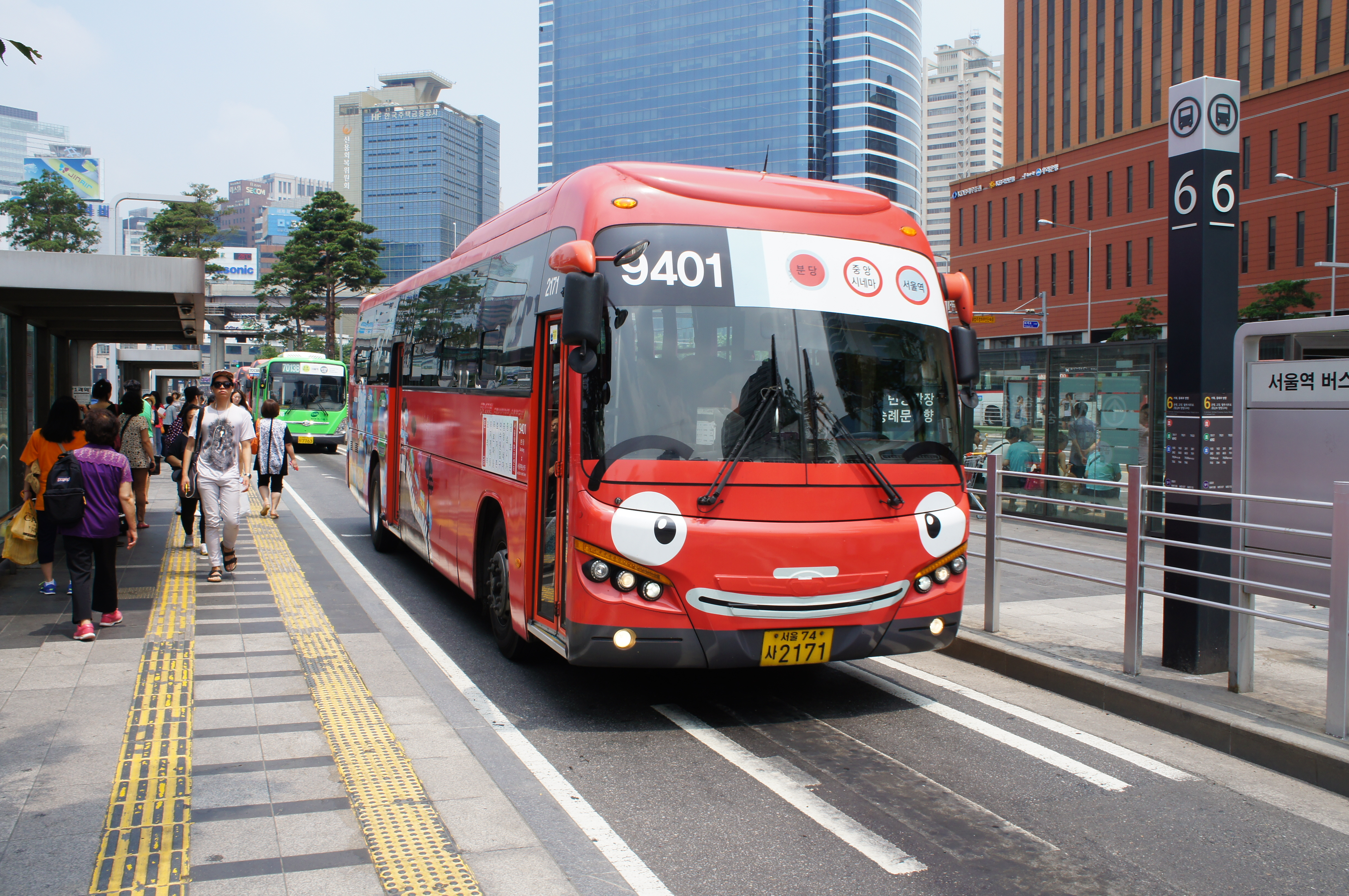
Route 9401 bus that received Gani wrap

In 2014, the Seoul Metropolitan Government commissioned buses designed as the characters Tayo, Gani, Rogi, and Lani, to run around the Gwanghwamun Square area of the city. This was done as part of an initiative to teach children how to use the bus. The initiative was a massive success, drawing crowds of over 40,000 in a single day. People from all across the country came to see the buses. Although the buses were originally set to run from March 26 until Public Transport Day at the end of April, their popularity led to an extension until Children's Day on May 5. The number of buses was also expanded from the original four to 100. In the wake of this success, it was reported that the local governments of other cities in South Korea were considering adopting the campaign. Officials for the city of Seoul initially opposed this on copyright grounds, but they consented in April to let other cities use the characters for non-commercial purposes.

Jaeyeon Woo of The Wall Street Journal's blog Korea Real-Time, speculated in an April 2014 article that the success of this initiative led both of Gyeonggi Province's gubernatorial candidates, Kim Sang-gon and Nam Kyung-pil, to adopt public transportation issues as a key part of their campaign platforms. Seoul-mayor Park Won-soon, who began the initiative, has been criticized by some of his political rivals, who feel that he took credit for the series, even though the series was begun by his predecessor's administration.

On October 16, 2014, a South Korean group called the Teen Astronauts, launched a space balloon designed as the character Tayo from the Space Science Park in Korea's National Science Museum.

=== Outside Korea ===
In late 2018, there was a Tayo bus phenomenon in Indonesia due to its theme song, often used as a joke or prank by many people. It becomes one of the 15 top trending searches in Google in Indonesia in 2018.

Since Desember 2019, one of public transport services in Tangerang, Banten named Bus Rapid Trans (BRT) Tangerang Ayo, abbreviated and called as "Tayo bus". The design of the bus inspired by the characters from the series.

Two bus systems in Banjarmasin, South Kalimantan, BRT Banjarbakula and Trans Banjarbakula, are informally called "Tayo bus" due to its size and color.

== Merchandise ==
A set of Tayo the Little Bus toy vehicles with a garage.

Tayo the Little Bus has a lot of merchandise like Pull-Back toys, Minicars, Stationery, Clothing, and Educational toys for children.

In October 2025, Bandai began officially selling several types of toys in the Japanese market, including the "Emergency Dispatch Center Playset" and the "Mobile Fire Station Playset."

== Movies ==
- The Tayo Movie: Mission Ace (2016)
- Tayo's Vroom Vroom Adventure (2017)
- Tayo's Toy Adventure (2019)
- Tayo Dino Kingdom Adventure (2019)
- Tayo and Little Wizards (2021)

== Tayo's Sing Along Show ==
Tayo's Sing Along Show is an animation program that aired on EBS in the first season from July 5 to September 27, 2013, and the second season from July 3 to September 25, 2015. It is an extra work of Tayo. The program is a new type of animation in which the children's friend, Tayo, the Little Bus, decorates an exciting song with various car friends.
